= 2026 Chicago Cubs season =

2026 Chicago Cubs
- National League Wild Card
- League: National League
- Division: Central
- Ballpark: Wrigley Field
- City: Chicago
- Record: 89–73 (.549)
- Divisional place: 2nd
- Owner: Tom Ricketts
- President of baseball operations: Jed Hoyer
- General manager: Carter Hawkins
- Manager: Craig Counsell
- Television: Marquee Sports Network; Jon Sciambi, Jim Deshaies, Alex Cohen, Cliff Floyd, Rick Sutcliffe, Ryan Dempster Taylor McGregor, Elise Menaker, Pat Hughes, Lance Brozdowski
- Radio: WSCR; Chicago Cubs Radio Network; Pat Hughes, Ron Coomer, Zach Zaidman, Matt Spiegel

The 2026 Chicago Cubs season was the 155th season of the Chicago Cubs franchise, the 151st in the National League, and the Cubs' 111th season at Wrigley Field. They are members of Major League Baseball's National League Central division. They began the season on March 26, 2026, against the Washington Nationals and finished the season on September 27 against the Boston Red Sox in a game played at Tropicana Field in St. Petersburg, Florida due to an expected nor'easter in the Boston area.

With two home runs (his 43rd and 44th of the season) in an 8–4 victory over the Atlanta Braves on September 16, Pete Crow-Armstrong set a franchise record for home runs by a left-handed batter in Cubs history. Crow-Armstrong stole his 40th base of the season on September 24 in a game against the Miami Marlins, making him just the seventh player (and first Cub) in MLB history to join the 40–40 club (at least 40 home runs and 40 stolen bases in a season). In the same game, the Cubs clinched a playoff berth for the second consecutive season following a 2–1 win over the Marlins.

For his successful season, Crow-Armstrong was named the unanimous National League MVP. Crow-Armstrong batted .280 with 45 home runs and 41 stolen bases while also winning the Gold Glove and Platinum Glove awards. He also led both leagues with a 10.6 fWAR. He was the first Cub since Kris Bryant in 2016 to win the award.

The Cubs finished the regular season 89–73 to finish in second place in the division, 14 games behind the Milwaukee Brewers. They received the second wild card spot and faced the San Diego Padres in the National League Wild Card Series for the second consecutive year where they were swept in two games.

== Previous season ==
The Cubs finished the 2025 season 92–70 to finish in second place in the NL Central division, five games behind the Milwaukee Brewers. They finished with the best record of non-division winners in the National League, securing the top wild card sport. They defeated the San Diego Padres two games to one in the National League Wild Card Series. They lost to the Brewers in the Division Series, losing the best of five series three games to two.

== Offseason ==
=== Transactions ===
==== October 2025 ====
October 12	Activated RHP Cade Horton, LHP Luke Little, RHP Porter Hodge, RHP Eli Morgan, RHP Gavin Hollowell, C Miguel Amaya, RHP Ethan Roberts, 1B Carlos Santana, LHP Jordan Wicks, OF Owen Caissie, RHP Ryan Brasier, LHP Taylor Rogers, RHP Jack Neely, and RHP Javier Assad.

==== November 2025 ====
November 2	LHP Caleb Thielbar, LHP Drew Pomeranz, RF Kyle Tucker, RHP Aaron Civale, LHP Taylor Rogers, RHP Ryan Brasier, OF Willi Castro, 1B Carlos Santana, and RHP Brad Keller elected free agency.
November 4	Traded RHP Andrew Kittredge to Baltimore Orioles for cash. LHP Shota Imanaga elected free agency.
November 6	Activated LHP Justin Steele. IF Justin Turner elected free agency.
November 10	Signed free agents SS Dylan Guzman, 2B Luis Palencia, OF Juan De Jesus, and C Sergio Patino to minor league contracts.
November 18	Signed free agent LHP Shota Imanaga. Selected the contracts of LHP Riley Martin and 2B James Triantos from Iowa Cubs. Selected the contract of 2B Pedro Ramírez from Knoxville Smokies.
November 21	RHP Eli Morgan and C Reese McGuire elected free agency.
November 25	Signed free agent RHP Phil Maton.

==== December 2025 ====
December 1	Signed free agent RHP Sam Mettert to a minor league contract.
December 4	Traded RHP Nico Zeglin to Houston Astros for cash.
December 10	Purchased contracts of RHP Adam Stone, 3B Devin Ortiz, and RHP Zane Mills in the Rule 5 draft.
December 12	Signed free agents RHP Collin Snider and IF Bryant Ciriaco to minor league contracts.
December 14	Signed free agents RHP Ruben Torres and OF Emill Olivo to minor league contracts.
December 15	Signed free agents LHP Fenuel James and RHP Esmerbin Guerrero to minor league contracts.
December 16	Signed free agent LHP Hoby Milner.
December 17	Signed free agent LHP Caleb Thielbar.
December 18	Signed free agent 1B Tyler Austin.
December 23	Signed free agent RHP Jacob Webb.
December 25	Signed free agent RHP Jeff Bringham to a minor league contract
December 31	Signed free agent RHP Hunter Harvey.

==== January 2026 ====
January 7	Traded OF Owen Caissie, IF Christian Hernandez, and IF Edgardo De Leon to Miami Marlins for RHP Edward Cabrera. Claimed RHP Ryan Rolison from Chicago White Sox.
January 14	Signed free agent 3B Alex Bregman to a 5-year $175 million contract.
January 15	Claimed 3B Ben Cowles off waivers from Chicago White Sox. Signed free agents RHP Jhosued Marcano, RHP Luciano Prince, RHP Yadier Concepcion, SS Franyel Almanzar, RHP Santiago Lopez, SS Esau Taveras, Marcos Mateo, OF Luis Diaz, SS Luis German, RHP Anderson Carias, RHP Jose Avendano, LHP Jose Serva, SS Luis Thomas, SS Diego Hernandez, SS D'Alessandro Barile, RHP Yamel Pinto, SS Giancarlos Mendoza, SS Samir Guerrero, SS Johan Geraldo, OF Enrique Oropeza, SS Yadier Munoz, SS Eduardo Gonzalez, OF Yanfri Serrano, OF Kotaro Tsunematsu, RHP Luis Martinez, SS Jaims Martinez, SS Xavier Cadiz, and OF Albert Moreno to minor league contracts.
January 23	Signed free agents RHP Trent Thornton and RHP Tyler Ras to minor league contracts.
January 24	Signed free agent RHP Yacksel Ríos to a minor league contract.
January 26	Signed free agents LF Chas McCormick, SS Karson Simas, RHP Tyler Beede, LF Dylan Carlson, and LHP Charlie Barnes to minor league contracts.
January 27	Signed free agent OF Alexander Ramirez to a minor league contract.

==== February 2026 ====
February 3	Signed free agents RHP Vince Velasquez, RHP Gabe Klobosits, and 2B Owen Miller to minor league contracts.
February 9	Invited non-rosters SS Jefferson Rojas, 1B Jonathon Long, 3B BJ Murray, RHP Connor Noland, RHP Grant Kipp, C Casey Opitz, RHP Jaxon Wiggins, C Ariel Armas, CF Brett Bateman, and RHP Connor Schultz to spring training.
February 15	Signed free agent RHP Shelby Miller. Designated 3B Ben Cowles for assignment.
February 17	Signed free agent RHP Kyle Wright to a minor league contract.
February 19	Signed free agents C Ethan Hearn and LHP Jackson Brockett to minor league contracts.
February 20	Assigned 1B Haydn McGeary, 2B Hayden Cantrelle, RHP Vince Reilly, RHP Frankie Scalzo Jr. , 2B Owen Miller, RF Parker Chavers, RHP Zane Mills, RHP Adam Stone, RHP Nick Hull, LF Jordan Nwogu, andLF Andy Garriola to Chicago Cubs.
February 21	Signed fee agents SS Alex Madera and SS Jaylen Palmer to minor league contracts. Assigned 3B Devin Ortiz, RHP Ryan Jensen, LHP Charlie Barnes, LHP Evan Taylor, RHP Jackson Kirkpatrick, andSS Angel Cepeda to Chicago Cubs.
February 22	Assigned OF Kane Kepley, LF Kade Snell, 1B Edgar Alvarez, LF Christian Olivo, RHP Yacksel Ríos, SS Eriandys Ramon, RHP Luis Rujano, RHP Zac Leigh, RHP Yenrri Rojas assigned, and RHP Grayson Moore to Chicago Cubs.
February 23	Assigned SS Ty Southisene, CF Alexey Lumpuy, 3B Drew Bowser, SS Ludwing Espinoza, RHP Walker Powell, RHP Brayden Spears, and C Carter Trice to Chicago Cubs.
February 24	Assigned SS Reginald Preciado and RHP Kenten Egbert to Chicago Cubs.
February 25	Assigned OF Josiah Hartshorn, LF Derik Alcantara, C Dilan Granadillo assigned, and C Owen Ayers to Chicago Cubs.
February 26	Signed free agent OF Michael Conforto to a minor league contract. Assigned C Miguel Useche to Chicago Cubs.
February 28	Assigned LHP Cole Reynolds to Chicago Cubs.

==== March 2026 ====
March 1	Placed RHP Shelby Miller on the 60-day injured list (IL). Claimed 3B Ben Cowles off waivers from Toronto Blue Jays. Assigned LHP Chase Watkins to Chicago Cubs.
March 3	Assigned RHP Luis Martinez-Gomez, 3B Christopher Paciolla, and RHP Ben Heller to Chicago Cubs.
March 4	Assigned SS Alex Madera, OF Jaylen Palmer, SS Ed Howard, and RHP Vince Velasquez to Chicago Cubs.
March 5	Assigned CF Darlyn De Leon and 3B Matt Halbach to Chicago Cubs.
March 6	Assigned LF Joan Delgado and 1B Brian Kalmer to Chicago Cubs.
March 8	Assigned SS Leonel Vivas and RHP Brooks Caple to Chicago Cubs. Optioned 2B James Triantos, 3B Ben Cowles, RHP Jack Neely, and LHP Riley Martin to Iowa. Optioned 2B Pedro Ramírez to Knoxville Smokies.
March 12	Optioned CF Justin Dean, LHP Ryan Rolison, and LHP Luke Little to Iowa. Assigned SS Jose Escobar to Chicago Cubs.
March 15	Assigned OF Cesar Lugo to Chicago Cubs.
March 16	Assigned C Logan Poteet and OF Jan Luis Reyes to Chicago Cubs.
March 17	C Michael Carico assigned to Chicago Cubs.
March 18	OF Eli Lovich assigned to Chicago Cubs.
March 19	Signed free agent RHP Dylan Lozada to a minor league contract.
March 20	Optioned RHPs Gavin Hollowell and Ethan Roberts to Iowa. C Justin Stransky, 2B Juan Cabada, 1B Cole Mathis, and SS Juan Tomas assigned to Chicago Cubs.
March 22	RHPs Ethan Bell and Jake Knapp assigned to Chicago Cubs.

== Regular season ==
=== Opening day lineup ===
Order	No.	Player	Pos.
Batters
1	29	Michael Busch	1B
2	3	Alex Bregman	3B
3	8	Ian Happ	LF
4	4	Pete Crow-Armstrong	CF
5	2	Nico Hoerner	2B
6	15	Carson Kelly	C
7	25	Moisés Ballesteros	DH
8	7	Dansby Swanson	SS
9	6	Matt Shaw	RF
Starting pitcher
—	16	Matthew Boyd	

=== Game log ===
Legend
	Cubs win
	Cubs loss
	Postponement
	Clinched playoff spot
**Bold**	Cubs team member

2026 Game Log: 89–73 (Home: 46–35; Away: 43–38)
March/April: 19–12 (Home: 11–5; Road: 8–7)

#	Date	Opponent	Score	Win	Loss	Save	Attendance	Record	Streak/ box
1	March 26	Nationals	4–10	Lord (1–0)	**Boyd** (0–1)	—	39,712	0–1	L1
2	March 28	Nationals	10–2	**Horton** (1–0)	Mikolas (0–1)	Brogdon (1–0)	34,834	1–1	W1
3	March 29	Nationals	3–6	Irvin (1–0)	**Imanaga** (0–1)	Beeter (1)	33,559	1–2	L1
4	March 30	Angels	7–2	**Cabrera** (1–0)	Johnson (0–1)	**Rea** (1)	36,702	2–2	W1
5	March 31	Angels	0–2	Soriano (2–0)	**Maton** (0–1)	Romano (2)	26,288	2–3	L1
6	April 1	Angels	6–2	**Boyd** (1–1)	Kikuchi (0–1)	—	25,125	3–3	W1
7	April 3	@ Guardians	1–4	Brogdon (2–0)	**Harvey** (0–1)	Smith (2)	37,360	3–4	L1
―	April 4	@ Guardians	**Postponed (rain)** (Makeup date: April 5)						
8	April 5 (1)	@ Guardians	1–0	**Thielbar** (1–0)	Brogdon (2–1)	**Palencia** (1)	see 2nd game	4–4	W1
9	April 5 (2)	@ Guardians	5–6	Armstrong (1–0)	**Webb** (0–1)	Smith (3)	19,791	4–5	L1
10	April 6	@ Rays	4–6	Kelly (1–1)	**Taillon** (0–1)	Baker (1)	25,114	4–6	L2
11	April 7	@ Rays	9–2	**Assad** (1–0)	Englert (0–1)	—	21,377	5–6	W1
12	April 8	@ Rays	6–2	**Rea** (1–0)	Boyle (0–1)	—	20,483	6–6	W2
13	April 10	Pirates	0–2	Montgomery (1–0)	**Thielbar** (1–1)	Santana (1)	28,811	6–7	L1
14	April 11	Pirates	3–4 (11)	Ramírez (2–0)	**Thielbar** (1–2)	—	34,049	6–8	L2
15	April 12	Pirates	7–6	**Palencia** (1–0)	Urquidy (0–1)	—	35,711	7–8	W1
16	April 13	@ Phillies	7–13	Sánchez (2–1)	**Assad** (1–1)	—	36,045	7–9	L1
17	April 14	@ Phillies	10–4	**Rea** (2–0)	Mayza (0–1)	—	37,426	8–9	W1
18	April 15	@ Phillies	11–2	**Imanaga** (1–1)	Luzardo (1–3)	—	38,254	9–9	W2
19	April 17	Mets	12–4	**Cabrera** (2–0)	Senga (0–3)	—	34,282	10–9	W3
20	April 18	Mets	4–2	**Taillon** (1–1)	Peralta (1–2)	**Thielbar** (1)	36,189	11–9	W4
21	April 19	Mets	2–1 (10)	**Thielbar** (2–2)	Kimbrel (0–1)	—	35,497	12–9	W5
22	April 20	Phillies	5–1	**Rea** (3–0)	Nola (1–2)	—	27,798	13–9	W6
23	April 21	Phillies	7–4	**Imanaga** (2–1)	Banks (0–1)	**Thielbar** (2)	30,651	14–9	W7
24	April 22	Phillies	7–2	**Brown** (1–0)	Walker (1–4)	—	29,591	15–9	W8
25	April 23	Phillies	8–7 (10)	**Assad** (2–1)	Banks (0–2)	—	31,057	16–9	W9
26	April 24	@ Dodgers	6–4	**Rolison** (1–0)	Scott (0–1)	**Martin** (1)	53,733	17–9	W10
27	April 25	@ Dodgers	4–12	Sasaki (1–2)	**Rea** (3–1)	—	53,397	17–10	L1
28	April 26	@ Dodgers	0–6	Wrobleski (4–0)	**Imanaga** (2–2)	—	52,060	17–11	L2
29	April 27	@ Padres	7–9	Vásquez (3–0)	**Brown** (1–1)	—	41,478	17–12	L3
30	April 28	@ Padres	8–3	**Cabrera** (3–0)	Hart (0–1)	—	40,106	18–12	W1
31	April 29	@ Padres	5–4	**Taillon** (2–1)	Morejón (2–1)	**Milner** (1)	36,513	19–12	W2

May: 13–16 (Home: 7–6; Road: 6–10)

#	Date	Opponent	Score	Win	Loss	Save	Attendance	Record	Streak/ box
32	May 1	Diamondbacks	6–5	**Rea** (4–1)	Gallen (1–2)	**Webb** (1)	31,083	20–12	W3
33	May 2	Diamondbacks	2–0	**Imanaga** (3–2)	Nelson (1–3)	**Brown** (1)	36,907	21–12	W4
34	May 3	Diamondbacks	8–4	**Boyd** (2–1)	Kelly (1–3)	—	35,597	22–12	W5
35	May 4	Reds	5–4	**Rolison** (2–0)	Pagán (2–1)	—	32,997	23–12	W6
36	May 5	Reds	3–2 (10)	**Rolison** (3–0)	Moll (1–2)	—	34,777	24–12	W7
37	May 6	Reds	7–6 (10)	**Thornton** (1–0)	Burke (1–2)	—	34,143	25–12	W8
38	May 7	Reds	8–3	**Imanaga** (4–2)	Lowder (3–3)	**Palencia** (2)	30,441	26–12	W9
39	May 8	@ Rangers	7–1	**Assad** (3–1)	Rocker (1–4)	—	32,394	27–12	W10
40	May 9	@ Rangers	0–6	Beeks (2–1)	**Cabrera** (3–1)	—	35,807	27–13	L1
41	May 10	@ Rangers	0–3	deGrom (3–2)	**Taillon** (2–2)	Latz (4)	34,221	27–14	L2
42	May 12	@ Braves	2–5	Fuentes (2–0)	**Rea** (4–2)	Iglesias (7)	38,342	27–15	L3
43	May 13	@ Braves	1–4	Suárez (4–0)	**Imanaga** (4–3)	Iglesias (8)	35,540	27–16	L4
44	May 14	@ Braves	2–0	**Milner** (1–0)	Sale (6–3)	**Palencia** (3)	36,367	28–16	W1
45	May 15	@ White Sox	10–5	**Thornton** (2–0)	Hudson (1–1)	—	38,723	29–16	W2
46	May 16	@ White Sox	3–8	Martin (6–1)	**Taillon** (2–3)	—	38,795	29–17	L1
47	May 17	@ White Sox	8–9 (10)	Davis (2–1)	**Rolison** (3–1)	—	38,608	29–18	L2
48	May 18	Brewers	3–8	Drohan (2–1)	**Imanaga** (4–4)	—	37,647	29–19	L3
49	May 19	Brewers	2–5	Misiorowski (4–2)	**Brown** (1–2)	Uribe (5)	38,190	29–20	L4
50	May 20	Brewers	0–5	Harrison (5–1)	**Cabrera** (3–2)	—	39,459	29–21	L5
51	May 22	Astros	2–4	Arrighetti (6–1)	**Taillon** (2–4)	King (5)	37,332	29–22	L6
52	May 23	Astros	0–3	Teng (3–3)	**Rea** (4–3)	King (6)	40,017	29–23	L7
53	May 24	Astros	5–8	Lambert (3–4)	**Imanaga** (4–5)	Pearson (1)	40,048	29–24	L8
54	May 25	@ Pirates	1–2	Dotel (1–0)	**Thornton** (2–1)	Soto (6)	22,174	29–25	L9
55	May 26	@ Pirates	1–12	Ashcraft (4–2)	**Wicks** (0–1)	—	13,950	29–26	L10
56	May 27	@ Pirates	10–4	**Webb** (1–1)	Ramírez (2–2)	—	12,340	30–26	W1
57	May 28	@ Pirates	7–2	**Rea** (5–3)	Skenes (6–5)	—	19,121	31–26	W2
58	May 29	@ Cardinals	5–6	Graceffo (4–1)	**Imanaga** (4–6)	O'Brien (14)	37.564	31–27	L1
59	May 30	@ Cardinals	6–1	**Brown** (2–2)	Fernandez (1–1)	—	40,147	32–27	W1
60	May 31	@ Cardinals	1–5	Liberatore (3–3)	**Wicks** (0–2)	Dobbins (1)	34,753	32–28	L1

June: 16–10 (Home: 7–6; Road: 9–4)

#	Date	Opponent	Score	Win	Loss	Save	Attendance	Record	Streak/ box
61	June 2	Athletics	1–2	Jump (1–1)	**Taillon** (2–5)	Harris (5)	36,065	32–29	L2
62	June 3	Athletics	4–5 (10)	Harris (3–0)	**Roberts** (0–1)	Sterner (1)	31,922	32–30	L3
63	June 4	Athletics	7–6	**Rolison** (4–1)	Kuhnel (1–2)	—	37,419	33–30	W1
64	June 5	Giants	3–18	Ray (4–6)	**Cabrera** (3–3)	—	39,060	33–31	L1
65	June 6	Giants	3–2 (10)	**Rolison** (5–1)	Hentges (1–1)	—	39,248	34–31	W1
66	June 7	Giants	1–2 (10)	Winn (2–1)	**Thornton** (2–2)	Smith (1)	36,317	34–32	L1
67	June 9	@ Rockies	3–7	Sugano (6–4)	**Rea** (5–4)	—	39,302	34–33	L2
68	June 10	@ Rockies	2–3	Senzatela (6–0)	**Palencia** (1–1)	—	31,802	34–34	L3
69	June 11	@ Rockies	9–3	**Cabrera** (4–3)	Feltner (2–2)	—	35,128	35–34	W1
70	June 12	@ Giants	5–1	**Assad** (4–1)	Roupp (5–7)	—	38,115	36–34	W2
71	June 13	@ Giants	6–1	**Brown** (3–2)	McDonald (2–4)	—	35,142	37–34	W3
72	June 14	@ Giants	1–5	Webb (4–4)	**Rea** (5–5)	―	40,093	37–35	L1
73	June 15	Rockies	5–4	**Palencia** (2–1)	Mejía (1–6)	—	38,337	38–35	W1
74	June 16	Rockies	2–5	Castaño (1–0)	**Cabrera** (4–4)	Hill (1)	35,183	38–36	L1
75	June 17	Rockies	8–6	**Assad** (5–1)	Sullivan (0–1)	**Webb** (2)	34,938	39–36	W1
76	June 19	Blue Jays	16–2	**Brown** (4–2)	Gausman (4–5)	—	40,275	40–36	W2
77	June 20	Blue Jays	6–8	Hoffman (5–4)	**Webb** (1–2)	Varland (15)	40,706	40–37	L1
―	June 21	Blue Jays	**Postponed (rain)** (Makeup date: August 6)						
―	June 22	@ Mets	**Postponed (rain)** (Makeup date: June 24)						
78	June 23	@ Mets	9–6	**Cabrera** (5–4)	Senga (0–6)	—	35,668	41–37	W1
79	June 24 (1)	@ Mets	10–3	**Assad** (6–1)	McLean (4–5)	—	31,951	42–37	W2
80	June 24 (2)	@ Mets	10–5	**Imanaga** (5–6)	Raley (2–2)	—	33,934	43–37	W3
81	June 25	@ Mets	4–3 (10)	**Webb** (2–2)	Raley (2–3)	**Thornton** (1)	36,035	44–37	W4
82	June 26	@ Brewers	2–6	Misiorowski (9–3)	**Roberts** (0–2)	—	41,021	44–38	L1
83	June 27	@ Brewers	8–2	**Peterson** (4–6)	Patrick (5–4)	―	40,193	45–38	W1
84	June 28	@ Brewers	4–3 (10)	**Webb** (3–2)	Kuhnel (1–3)	**Wicks** (1)	42,056	46–38	W2
85	June 29	Padres	3–2	**Thornton** (3–2)	Adam (2–2)	—	37,607	47–38	W3
86	June 30	Padres	9–7	**Boyd** (3–1)	Sears (1–1)	**Rolison** (1)	36,279	48–38	W4

July: 14–10 (Home: 5–6; Road: 9–4)

#	Date	Opponent	Score	Win	Loss	Save	Attendance	Record	Streak/ box
87	July 1	Padres	23–3	**Rea** (6–5)	Buehler (5–4)	**Wicks** (2)	37,311	49–38	W5
88	July 3	Cardinals	1–17	Pallante (10–5)	**Peterson** (4–7)	—	39,440	49–39	L1
89	July 4	Cardinals	0–3	Leahy (7–4)	**Imanaga** (5–7)	O'Brien (22)	38,872	49–40	L2
90	July 5	Cardinals	6–4	**Pomeranz** (1–3)	Liberatore (4–6)	**Webb** (3)	38,322	50–40	W1
91	July 7	@ Orioles	5–2	**Boyd** (4–1)	Baz (4–9)	**Thornton** (2)	16,200	51–40	W2
92	July 8	@ Orioles	9–7	**Rea** (7–5)	Kremer (1–2)	**Webb** (4)	18,935	52–40	W3
93	July 9	@ Orioles	2–3	Wells (2–1)	**Ferguson** (0–1)	Kittredge (2)	12,052	52–41	L1
94	July 10	@ Reds	0–4	Greene (1–1)	**Imanaga** (5–8)	—	30,878	52–42	L2
95	July 11	@ Reds	5–3	**Pomeranz** (2–3)	Garcia (0–1)	**Thornton** (3)	34,199	53–42	W1
96	July 12	@ Reds	8–4	**Boyd** (5–1)	Petty (1–2)	**Webb** (5)	29,200	54–42	W2
**96th All-Star Game in Philadelphia, PA**
97	July 17	Twins	2–5	Ober (7–3)	**Rea** (7–6)	Gómez (12)	39,855	54–43	L1
98	July 18	Twins	6–2	**Boyd** (6–1)	Bradley (9–4)	—	39,508	55–43	W1
99	July 19	Twins	10–1	**Imanaga** (6–8)	Matthews (4–7)	—	37,205	56–43	W2
100	July 20	Tigers	6–8 (10)	Jansen (2–4)	**Thornton** (3–3)	Holton (1)	39,023	56–44	L1
101	July 21	Tigers	11–2	**Peterson** (5–7)	Valdez (5–7)	—	39,039	57–44	W1
102	July 22	Tigers	1–5	Montero (7–5)	**Rea** (7–7)	—	40,512	57–45	L1
103	July 24	@ Pirates	3–2 (10)	**Thielbar** (3–2)	Ramírez (6–3)	**Hollowell** (1)	33,593	58–45	W1
104	July 25	@ Pirates	11–0	**Imanaga** (7–8)	Skenes (9–9)	**Assad** (1)	39,105	59–45	W2
105	July 26	@ Pirates	7–8	Ashcraft (10–4)	**Taillon** (2–6)	Montgomery (2)	32,921	59–46	L1
106	July 27	@ Cardinals	7–3	**Peterson** (6–7)	Liberatore (5–8)	—	24,209	60–46	W1
107	July 28	@ Cardinals	10–2	**Rea** (8–7)	McGreevy (4–9)	—	29,097	61–46	W2
108	July 29	@ Cardinals	2–3 (10)	Gastélum (2–1)	**Thornton** (3–4)	—	31,499	61–47	L1
109	July 30	@ Cardinals	4–2 (10)	**Webb** (4–2)	Gastélum (2–2)	**Civale** (1)	29,475	62–47	W1
110	July 31	Yankees	0–2	Warren (8–5)	**Imanaga** (7–9)	Bednar (23)	40,129	62–48	L1

August: 16–12 (Home: 10–6; Road: 6–6)

#	Date	Opponent	Score	Win	Loss	Save	Attendance	Record	Streak/ box
111	August 1	Yankees	5–2	**Thornton** (4–4)	Cruz (4–6)	**Thielbar** (3)	39,630	63–48	W1
112	August 2	Yankees	1–2	Cole (5–5)	**Rea** (8–8)	Bednar (24)	40,057	63–49	L1
113	August 3	Dodgers	10–5	**Boyd** (7–1)	Wrobleski (11–3)	—	39,384	64–49	W1
114	August 4	Dodgers	5–1	**Rolison** (6–1)	Skubal (7–6)	—	40,584	65–49	W2
115	August 5	Dodgers	7–6	**Imanaga** (8–9)	Lauer (6–6)	**Webb** (6)	38,691	66–49	W3
116	August 6	Blue Jays	3–2 (11)	**Thornton** (5–4)	Little (0–3)	—	39,476	67–49	W4
117	August 7	@ Royals	6–4	**Gausman** (6–10)	Lynch IV (4–3)	**Webb** (7)	26,083	68–49	W5
118	August 8	@ Royals	3–6	Lugo (5–7)	**Holmes** (4–5)	Pearson (2)	32,326	68–50	L1
119	August 9	@ Royals	10–2	**Boyd** (8–1)	Dobnak (2–1)	—	24,225	69–50	W1
120	August 11	@ Nationals	8–6	**Rolison** (7–1)	Irvin (2–6)	**Webb** (8)	23,428	70–50	W2
121	August 12	@ Nationals	12–6	**Peterson** (7–7)	Cosgrove (0–2)	**Assad** (2)	21,116	71–50	W3
122	August 13	@ Nationals	0–7	Cavalli (10–5)	**Gausman** (6–11)	—	21,463	71–51	L1
123	August 14	Cardinals	3–0	**Holmes** (5–5)	Liberatore (5–10)	**Webb** (9)	40,374	72–51	W1
124	August 15	Cardinals	4–8	McGreevy (5–9)	**Boyd** (8–2)	—	39,834	72–52	L1
125	August 16	Cardinals	4–11	Dobbins (3–3)	**Cabrera** (5–5)	—	39,395	72–53	L2
126	August 17	White Sox	7–5 (10)	**Webb** (5–2)	Smith (2–1)	—	40,354	73–53	W1
127	August 18	White Sox	4–3	**Webb** (6–2)	Richards (0–1)	—	40,304	74–53	W2
128	August 19	White Sox	0–3	Urquidy (2–1)	**Holmes** (5–6)	Taylor (7)	40,086	74–54	L1
129	August 21	@ Mariners	5–6 (10)	Domínguez (5–3)	**Zeferjahn** (4–4)	—	46,018	74–55	L2
130	August 22	@ Mariners	4–5	Rucker (1–4)	**Webb** (6–3)	—	45,681	74–56	L3
131	August 23	@ Mariners	19–2	**Civale** (6–7)	Miller (4–8)	—	44,649	75–56	W1
132	August 24	@ Diamondbacks	7–0	**Gausman** (7–11)	Kelly (8–12)	—	28,704	76–56	W2
133	August 25	@ Diamondbacks	4–5	Martínez (1–0)	**Webb** (6–4)	—	28,215	76–57	L1
134	August 26	@ Diamondbacks	0–2	Rodríguez (14–4)	**Boyd** (8–3)	Morillo (2)	24,297	76–58	L2
135	August 28	Reds	8–10	Lowder (6–8)	**Thornton** (5–5)	Pagán (18)	39,036	76–59	L3
136	August 29	Reds	17–5	**Gausman** (8–11)	Abbott (6–10)	—	39,597	77–59	W1
137	August 30	Reds	5–7	Burns (15–3)	**Imanaga** (8–10)	Pagán (19)	36,308	77–60	L1
138	August 31	Brewers	17–3	**Holmes** (6–6)	Harrison (10–4)	—	34,763	78–60	W1

September: 11–13 (Home: 6–6; Road: 5–7)

#	Date	Opponent	Score	Win	Loss	Save	Attendance	Record	Streak/ box
139	September 1	Brewers	4–9	Senzatela (10–4)	**Palencia** (2–2)	—	33,185	78–61	L1
140	September 2	Brewers	5–9	Romero (2–3)	**Peterson** (7–8)	—	36,112	78–62	L2
141	September 3	Brewers	2–1	**Gausman** (9–11)	Henderson (9–3)	**Rolison** (2)	39,018	79–62	W1
142	September 4	@ Marlins	6–1	**Imanaga** (9–10)	Junk (6–9)	**Civale** (2)	17,470	80–62	W2
143	September 5	@ Marlins	6–5	**Rolison** (8–1)	Gusto (1–4)	**Zeferjahn** (5)	26,141	81–62	W3
144	September 6	@ Marlins	3–10	Phillips (5–6)	**Holmes** (6–7)	—	29,526	81–63	L1
145	September 7	@ Brewers	3–4	Uribe (5–2)	**Boyd** (8–4)	Megill (27)	42,368	81–64	L2
146	September 8	@ Brewers	3–4 (10)	Hall (3–0)	**Thielbar** (3–3)	—	36,076	81–65	L3
147	September 9	@ Brewers	6–8	Henderson (10–3)	**Gausman** (9–12)	—	36,073	81–66	L4
148	September 11	Pirates	12–2	**Imanaga** (10–10)	Dotel (1–5)	—	39,190	82–66	W1
149	September 12	Pirates	4–3	**Rolison** (9–1)	Soto (6–5)	**Zeferjahn** (6)	39,422	83–66	W2
150	September 13	Pirates	3–4	Chandler (8–9)	**Boyd** (8–5)	Montgomery (13)	39,103	83–67	L1
151	September 14	Braves	7–3	**Peterson** (8–8)	López (4–5)	—	34,515	84–67	W1
152	September 15	Braves	3–6	Pérez (9–9)	**Webb** (6–5)	Iglesias (33)	38,516	84–68	L1
153	September 16	Braves	8–4	**Imanaga** (11–10)	Ritchie (1–3)	—	35,779	85–68	W1
154	September 18	@ Reds	4–6	Aguiar (1–0)	**Holmes** (6–8)	Pagán (24)	31,678	85–69	L1
155	September 19	@ Reds	5–2	**Boyd** (9–5)	Lodolo (3–6)	**Rolison** (3)	37,031	86–69	W1
156	September 20	@ Reds	9–1	**Peterson** (9–8)	Lowder (6–12)	—	28,917	87–69	W2
157	September 22	Marlins	2–8 (12)	Ekness (3–4)	**Thielbar** (3–4)	—	33,759	87–70	L1
158	September 23	Marlins	2–3	Gibson (6–2)	**Rolison** (9–2)	Alcántara (2)	36,635	87–71	L2
159	September 24	Marlins	2–1	**Boyd** (10–5)	Ralston (0–2)	**Zeferjahn** (7)	35,410	88–71	W1
160	September 25	@ Red Sox (1)	3–4	Weissert (4–2)	**Civale** (6–8)	Burgos (2)	33,506	88–72	L1
161	September 25	@ Red Sox (2)	0–2	Páez (1–1)	**Assad** (6–2)	—	36,449	88–73	L2
162	September 27	@ Red Sox*	6–2	**Garrett** (1–1)	Houck (0–1)	**Rea** (2)	20,411	89–73	W1

*September 27 game played at Tropicana Field in St. Petersburg, Florida due to nor'easter expected to impact the Boston area

=== Season standings ===
==== National League Central ====
NL Central
Team	W	L	Pct.	GB	Home	Road
Milwaukee Brewers	103	59	.636	—	55‍–‍26	48‍–‍33
Chicago Cubs	89	73	.549	14	46‍–‍35	43‍–‍38
Pittsburgh Pirates	82	80	.506	21	44‍–‍37	38‍–‍43
St. Louis Cardinals	77	85	.475	26	38‍–‍43	39‍–‍42
Cincinnati Reds	75	87	.463	28	38‍–‍43	37‍–‍44

==== National League Wild Card ====
Division leaders
Team	W	L	Pct.
Milwaukee Brewers	103	59	.636
Los Angeles Dodgers	100	62	.617
Atlanta Braves	94	68	.580

Wild Card teams (Top 3 teams qualify for postseason)
Team	W	L	Pct.	GB
San Diego Padres	91	71	.562	+3
Chicago Cubs	89	73	.549	+1
Philadelphia Phillies	88	74	.543	—
Arizona Diamondbacks	86	76	.531	2
Pittsburgh Pirates	82	80	.506	6
Miami Marlins	80	82	.494	8
St. Louis Cardinals	77	85	.475	11
Washington Nationals	77	85	.475	11
Cincinnati Reds	75	87	.463	13
New York Mets	74	88	.457	14
San Francisco Giants	65	97	.401	23
Colorado Rockies	58	104	.358	30

==== Record vs. opponents ====
2026 National League record Source: MLB Standings Grid – 2026
Team	AZ	ATL	CHC	CIN	COL	LAD	MIA	MIL	NYM	PHI	PIT	SD	SF	STL	WSH	AL
Arizona	—	4–3	2–4	4–2	9–4	7–6	1–5	2–4	4–2	3–3	3–3	6–7	10–3	5–2	2–4	24–24
Atlanta	3–4	—	3–3	3–3	6–0	5–1	9–4	3–3	6–7	9–4	5–1	3–4	1–5	2–4	9–4	27–21
Chicago	4–2	3–3	—	9–4	3–3	4–2	3–3	4–9	7–0	6–1	7–6	5–1	3–3	6–7	3–3	22–26
Cincinnati	2–4	3–3	4–9	—	4–2	1–6	3–4	4–9	4–2	3–3	6–7	3–3	3–3	5–8	1–5	29–19
Colorado	4–9	0–6	3–3	2–4	—	3–10	2–5	1–5	4–2	2–4	3–3	2–11	7–6	2–4	3–4	20–28
Los Angeles	6–7	1–5	2–4	6–1	10–3	—	2–4	3–4	5–1	4–2	5–1	8–5	9–4	2–4	6–0	31–17
Miami	5–1	4–9	3–3	4–3	5–2	4–2	—	1–5	6–7	5–8	4–2	0–6	4–2	4–2	9–4	22–26
Milwaukee	4–2	3–3	9–4	9–4	5–1	4–3	5–1	—	4–2	4–2	6–7	2–4	3–4	11–2	2–4	32–16
New York	2–4	7–6	0–7	2–4	2–4	1–5	7–6	2–4	—	6–7	4–2	4–2	5–2	2–4	7–6	23–25
Philadelphia	3–3	4–9	1–6	3–3	4–2	2–4	8–5	2–4	7–6	—	5–2	6–0	4–2	4–2	9–4	26–22
Pittsburgh	3–3	1–5	6–7	7–6	3–3	1–5	2–4	7–6	2–4	2–5	—	3–3	3–3	6–7	4–3	32–16
San Diego	7–6	4–3	1–5	3–3	11–2	5–8	6–0	4–2	2–4	0–6	3–3	—	9–4	3–4	4–2	29–19
San Francisco	3–10	5–1	3–3	3–3	6–7	4–9	2–4	4–3	2–5	2–4	3–3	4–9	—	5–1	3–3	16–32
St. Louis	2–5	4–2	7–6	8–5	4–2	4–2	2–4	2–11	4–2	2–4	7–6	4–3	1–5	—	3–3	23–25
Washington	4–2	4–9	3–3	5–1	4–3	0–6	4–9	4–2	6–7	4–9	3–4	2–4	3–3	3–3	—	28–20

Updated with the results of all games through September 27, 2026.

=== Season summary ===
==== March ====
- **March 12** – The Cubs announced that Matthew Boyd would be the Opening Day starting pitcher.
- **March 23** – The Cubs announced the Seiya Suzuki will start the season in the injured list (IL) due to a knee injury suffered in the 2026 World Baseball Classic.
- **March 26** – The Cubs opened the season at Wrigley Field against the Washington Nationals. Matthew Boyd allowed six runs in 3.2 innings and the Nationals scored six runs in the fourth. Michael Busch had three hits and was on base four times while Pete Crow-Armstrong, after signing a new contract extension, had two hits and drove in two. However, it was not enough as the Nationals won easily 10–4.
- **March 28** – After a scheduled off day, the Cubs resumed their series with the Nationals. Cade Horton pitched 6.1 innings and allowed only two runs as the Cubs blew out Washington 10–2. Ian Happ homered and drove in three runs while Miguel Amaya also homered and drove in two runs in the win.
- **March 29** – In the finale of the three-game series against the Nationals, Alex Bregman hit his first two homers as a Cub and Happ homered for the second straight game. However, Shota Imanaga allowed four runs in five innings and Hoby Milner allowed two runs as the Cubs lost 6–3.
- **March 30** – The Los Angeles Angels came to Wrigley the next day, but were shut down by new Cub Edward Cabrera who allowed only one hit and one walk in six shutout innings. Happ homered for the third straight game while Carson Kelly and Moisés Ballesteros each drove in two for the Cubs. Colin Rea pitched three innings and allowed two runs in relief to earn the save and pushed the Cubs 2–2 on the season.
- **March 31** – In game two against the Angels, the Cubs were shut out 2–0. Jameson Taillon allowed no runs, but walked four in 4.2 innings of work. Phil Maton allowed two runs in the sixth to put the Cubs behind.

==== April ====
- **April 1** – In the final game of the series against the Angels, Matthew Boyd allowed two runs in 5.2 innings. The Cubs scored five runs in the third and Matt Shaw drove in two runs as the Cubs won 6–2. Three Cub relievers blanked the Angels for the win. The Cubs moved back to .500 on the season at 3–3.
- **April 3** – After a scheduled off day, the Cubs will play their first road games of the season in Cleveland against the Guardians. In game one, Cade Horton left after only one inning with forearm soreness. Miguel Amaya drove in a run in the third while Colin Rea pitched 3.1 innings of relief and allowed one run. However, Cub reliever Hunter Harvey allowed three runs in the seventh as the Cubs lost 4–1.
- **April 5** – After a rainout the day before, the Cubs played a doubleheader against the Guardians. In game one, Edward Cabrera pitched 5.2 innings while allowing only one hit. Three Cub relievers held the Guardians hitless for the remainder of the game. Amaya drove in the winning run in the eighth as the Cubs won 1–0. In game two, the Cubs led early on a Matt Shaw home run while Dansby Swanson added a two-run homer in the sixth. Shota Imanaga allowed only one run in five plus innings of work. However, Ben Brown allowed two runs in two innings of relief to allow the Guardians to tie the game. Ian Happ gave the Cubs the lead again in the eighth with his fourth homer of the year, but Jacob Webb allowed three runs while getting only one out. Happ drove in another run in the ninth, but it was not enough as the Cubs lost 6–5.
- **April 6** – The Cubs next traveled to face the Tampa Bay Rays for their home opener at Tropicana Field, the first game in the stadium in 561 days after it was damaged by Hurricane Milton. The Cubs took the lead in the second on a two-run scoring single by Nico Hoerner. However, Jameson Taillon surrendered four runs, three earned, in six innings. Phil Maton allowed two runs in the seventh while Matt Shaw hit his second homer of the season as the Cubs lost 6–4.
- **April 7** – Javier Assad got the start for the Cubs, filling in for Matthew Boyd who went on the injured list the day before. Assad pitched 5.2 scoreless innings while allowing only one hit. Meanwhile, the Cub offense came alive, amassing 16 hits and nine runs as they blew out the Rays 9–2. Moisés Ballesteros hit his first homer of the season and drove in three runs while Pete Crow-Armstrong also hit his first homer of the year. Nico Hoerner drove in two runs as seven Cubs had two or more hits in the game. The win moved the Cubs to 5–6 on the season.
- **April 8** – Nico Hoerner led off the game with a home run and also doubled to drive in run. Michael Conforto hit a bases-clearing double in the fifth as the Cubs beat the Rays 6–2 to take two of three games in the series. Colin Rea, pitching for Cade Horton who had been sidelined for the season, pitched five innings while allowing one run in the win.
- **April 10** – After a scheduled off day, Shota Imanaga pitched six shutout innings and allowed only one walk and no hits. However, Caleb Thielbar allowed the first Pirates' hit of the game to the first batter he faced and then allowed a home run to the next batter to give the Pirates a 2–0 lead. The Cub offense failed to score as the Cubs lost.
- **April 11** – The next day, Edward Cabrera allowed three runs in five innings while the Cubs pushed across a run in the fifth, seventh, and the ninth to force extra innings. While neither team scored in the 10th, the Pirates pushed their Manfred runner in the 11th. In the bottom half of the inning, Nico Hoerner reached on an error and advanced to second on the same error to give the Cubs runners on second and third with no outs. However, the Cubs failed to push across a run as they lost 4–3.
- **April 12** – With the wind blowing out in the final game of the series, Jameson Taillon allowed six runs in five innings including a grand slam in the second. Dansby Swanson and Moisés Ballesteros both homered to narrow the lead. Alex Bregman drove in a run in fifth and seventh to bring the Cubs within two. Michael Busch, who did not start the game as he was mired in an 0–30 slump, pinch hit and singled with two runners on. Both runners scored on errors by the Pirates on the play to tie the game. With the game still tied in the bottom of the ninth, Carson Kelly singled to drive in the winning run. The win moved the Cubs to 7–8 on the season.
- **April 13** – Opening a three-game series against the Philadelphia Phillies at Citizens Bank Park, Javier Assad allowed nine runs in 4.1 innings. Dansby Swanson homered and drove in two as the Cubs scored seven runs, but they were blown out 13–7.
- **April 14** – The next day, the Cubs returned the favor, blowing out the Phillies 10–4. Colin Rea entered in the second after the Cubs used an opener in the first and allowed a three-run homer in the inning. From there, he shut out the Phillies, allowing only the three runs in six innings of work. Alex Bregman and Nico Hoerner each drove in three runs to give the Cubs the lead and Carson Kelly hit a three-run homer in the ninth to put the game out of reach.
- **April 15** – In the finale of the series against the Phillies, Nico Hoerner homered and drove in five runs while Matt Shaw had three doubles and two RBI. Shota Imanaga allowed a leadoff home run, but held the Phillies scoreless for the remaining of his six innings as the Cubs won easily again. Dansby Swanson also homered in the 11–2 win as the Cubs moved to .500 on the season.
- **April 17** – The Cubs returned home to face the New York Mets, losers of eight straight games, after a scheduled off day. In game one, Edward Cabrera pitched six innings while allowing three runs. Three Cub relievers combined to hold the Mets to one more run. Meanwhile, the Cub offense made sure the game would not be close. Ian Happ, Nico Hoerner, and Moisés Ballesteros each homered while Ballestros drove in three runs as the Cubs won 12–4.
- **April 18** – In game two, Jameson Taillon allows on run in six innings and Carson Kelly hit a pinch-hit three-run homer as the Cubs gave the Mets their 10th straight loss, winning 4–2.
- **April 19** – In the finale of the series, Javier Assad allowed a solo home run in 5.2 innings, but left trailing 1–0. The Cub offense remained quiet until Michael Conforto drove in the tying run on a pinch-hit double in the bottom of the ninth. Caleb Thielbar prevented the Manfred runner from scoring in the 10th and, following a wild pitch in the bottom of the 10th, Nico Hoerner drove in the winning run with a sacrifice fly to give the Cubs the 2–1 win. The win was the Cubs fifth straight and moved them to 12–9 on the season.
- **April 20** – The Cubs next faced the Phillies for a four-game series. In game one, Colin Rea allowed one run in 6.2 innings of work while the Cub bullpen blanked the Phillies. Dansby Swanson hit a three-run homer in a four-run third inning as the Cubs won their sixth straight game, 5–1.
- **April 21** – The second game of the series remained tight with neither team scoring until the Cubs pushed across a run in the fifth. However, Shota Imanaga gave up a Kyle Schwarber solo homer in the sixth that allowed the Phillies to tie the game. Michael Busch drove in two in the bottom of the fifth while Nico Hoerner and Seiya Suzuki homered in the seventh to extend the lead to 6–1. Imanaga went seven innings allowing only the one run. The Phillies tightened the score on a Bryce Harper homer, but the Cubs held on for the 7–4 win. The victory was the Cubs seventh straight win and the Phillies seventh straight loss.
- **April 22** – Matthew Boyd returned from the IL and allowed two runs in 4.2 innings while three Cub relievers shut out the Phillies for the remainder of the game. Seiya Suzuki and Michael Busch homered for the Cubs while Ian Happ and Pete Crow-Armstrong each drove in two runs. The 7–2 win moved the Cubs to 15–9 on the season, half a game out of first in the Central division.
- **April 23** – Looking to complete a perfect 7–0 homestand, the Cubs took an early lead on Dansby Swanson sacrifice fly and Michael Busch's three run homer in the third. The Cubs extend the lead to 6–2 on an Ian Happ homer and another RBI by Busch. Edward Cabrera gave up five runs, three in the seventh, but left with a one-run lead. The Phillies tied it in the eighth before Seiya Suzuki hit his third home run in three games to give the Cubs a one-run lead. In the top of the ninth, another homer tied the game and forced extra innings. In the bottom of the 10th, Swanson singled to drive in the winning run and extend the Cubs' winning streak to nine games. With the wind blowing out at Wrigley, there were five home runs in the game.
- **April 24** – Going on the road, the Cubs faced the defending champion Los Angeles Dodgers. In game one, Jameson Taillon allowed four runs in five innings and the Cubs failed to score until the seventh. Dansby Swanson drove in two runs on a triple and scored on a Nico Hoerner single to narrow the lead to 4–3. Alex Bregman homered in the eighth to tie it and Swanson hit a two-run homer to give the Cubs a 6–4 lead in the ninth. Corbin Martin pitched a perfect ninth for the save as the Cubs won their 10th straight game and moved into a tie for first in the division.
- **April 25** – In game two, Colin Rea allowed six runs in 3.1 innings while Javier Assad allowed six runs in 2.1 innings as the Cubs were blown out by the Dodgers 12–4. Seiya Suzuki and Moisés Ballesteros homered for the Cubs in the loss. The loss dropped the Cubs to 17–10 on the season.
- **April 26** – In the series finale against the Dodgers, Shota Imanaga allowed five runs in 5.1 innings and the Cubs were shut out 6–0. The loss dropped them out of first place in the division.
- **April 27** – The Cubs next travelled to San Diego to face the Padres. Matthew Boyd allowed five runs in four-plus innings, but left with a 5–4 lead following a Moisés Ballesteros grand slam. The Cub bullpen, besieged by injuries, allowed four more runs to score as the Cubs lost their third straight, 9–7. Seiya Suzuki also homered for the Cubs in the loss.
- **April 28** – In game two against the Padres, Dansby Swanson drove in two runs in the second before leaving with an injury. Edward Cabrera gave up three runs in 5.2 innings, but left with a 4–3 lead on a two-run double by Nico Hoerner. Alex Bregman drove in a run in the seventh with a pinch-hit single before Pete Crow-Armstrong hit his second homer of the season, a three-run homer to give the Cubs an 8–3 lead. Two Cub relievers held the Padres hitless as Craig Counsell earned his 900th career win as a manager.
- **April 29** – James Taillon pitched seven innings while allowing only three runs. Pete Crow-Armstrong hit a homer for the second straight day and drove in three runs while Matt Shaw also homered. Three Cub relievers combined to hold the Padres scoreless as the Cubs won 5–4. The win moved the Cubs to 19–12 on the season, half a game out of first in the division.

==== May ====
- **May 1** – After an off day, the Cubs returned home to face the Arizona Diamondbacks. Colin Rea allowed two runs in 5.1 innings of work and left with a 6–1 lead. Cub reliever Ryan Rolison allowed a three-run homer to narrow the lead to 6–5 in the seventh. However, the Cub bullpen held the D-backs scoreless from there as the Cubs won 6–5. Michael Busch drove in two runs while three other Cubs drove in runs in the win. The win moved the Cubs into a tie for first place in the division.
- **May 2** – In game two, Shota Imanaga threw seven scoreless innings against the Diamondbacks while Ben Brown pitched two perfect innings in relief as the Cubs won 2–0. Ian Happ homered and Seiya Suzuki drove in a run as the Cubs moved into sole possession of first place in the division.
- **May 3** – In the finale against Arizona, Matthew Boyd allowed two runs in six innings. Moisés Ballesteros hit a two-run homer while Michael Busch tripled and drove in four runs to give the Cubs the 8–4 win. Carson Kelly also drove in two runs as the Cubs swept the D-backs and won their fifth straight game overall and 11th straight at Wrigley. The win moved the Cubs to 22–12, two games ahead in the division.
- **May 4** – The following day, the Cincinnati Reds came to town for a four-game series. Following an almost two-hour rain delay, the Reds took an early lead with two home runs off of Cub starter Edward Cabrera. However, Seiya Suzuki tied the game with a three-run homer in the fourth. The Reds retook the lead off of reliever Ben Brown in the eighth. The Cubs entered the bottom of the ninth still down a run before Pete Crow-Armstrong led off the inning with a triple. Nico Hoerner followed with a sacrifice fly to tie the game. Pinch hitter Michael Conforto then hit a walk-off home run to give the Cubs their sixth straight win, 5–4.
- **May 5** – In game two, Jameson Taillon allowed two runs in 5.2 innings and the Cubs were shut out until the seventh when Alex Bregman drove in the first run for the Cubs. Michael Busch homered in the eighth to tie the game at two. In the 10th, Busch singled home the winning run on the second pitch to give the Cubs the win over the Reds. It marked the team's seventh straight win, their 13th straight at Wrigley, and moved the Cubs to 12 games over .500 on the season.
- **May 6** – The Cubs took an early 2–1 lead against the Reds on Ian Happ's ninth homer of the season, extending his on-base streak to 27 games. An RBI double by Seiya Suzuki in the fourth and a double play ground ball by Carson Kelly extended the lead to 4–1. Colin Rea allowed a second run in the fifth and left with a two-run lead. Still trailing by two in the ninth, the Reds scored four times on the Cubs beleaguered bullpen to get a 6–4 lead. In the bottom of the ninth, Pete Crow-Armstrong tied the game on two-run homer to force extra innings. New Cub Trent Thornton got three outs in the 10th and Michael Busch walked with the bases loaded to give the Cubs yet another come from behind win. The win marked the Cubs' 18th win in their prior 21 games, their 14th straight at Wrigley, and their eighth in a row as they moved to 25–12 on the season. It also marked the first time since 1943 that the Cubs had won three straight games with a walk-off against the same opponent.
- **May 7** – In the finale of the homestand, the Cubs blew out the Reds 8–3. Shota Imanaga pitched six innings and allowed only one run while striking out 10. Michael Conforto homered and drove in two as the Cubs swept the Reds and the homestand. They moved to 26–12 on the season, tied for the best record in baseball.
- **May 8** – Taking to the road, the Cubs blew out the Texas Rangers 7–1. Michael Busch had a three-run double while Seiya Suzuki homered and drove in two runs. Ben Brown got the start for the injured Matthew Boyd and pitched four scoreless innings. The Cub bullpen combined to hold the Rangers to only one run as the Cubs moved to 27–12 on the season, winning their 10th in a row for the second time on the season.
- **May 9** – In the second game of the series against the Rangers, Edward Cabrera gave up five runs in five innings and the Cubs were shut out 6–0. The loss ended the Cubs' 10-game winning streak.
- **May 10** – Jameson Taillon pitched well, allowing only one run in 5.1 innings, but the Cub offense was held scoreless for the second consecutive game. As a result, the Rangers beat the Cubs 3–0. The Cubs dropped to 13 games over .500 and their division lead moved to 3.5 games.
- **May 12** – After an off day, the Cubs faced the Atlanta Braves in Atlanta. Colin Rea allowed five runs in 4.1 innings as the Cubs lost their third straight game 5–2. Alex Bregman homered in the loss.
- **May 13** – In game two against the Braves, Shota Imanaga pitched seven innings while allowing only one run. After a leadoff single in the eighth, Imanaga was lifted for Phil Maton who gave up a run-scoring double and two-run homer as the Cubs lost 4–1. Nico Hoerner drove in the only run for the Cubs who lost their fourth straight game. The loss dropped the Cubs to 27–16 on the season, but remained 2.5 games up in the division.
- **May 14** – In the final game of the series against the Braves, five Cub pitchers combined to shut out the Braves. Matt Shaw drove in a run on a groundout and Ian Happ hit his 10th homer of the season to end the Cubs losing streak with a 2–0 win.
- **May 15** – The Cubs returned to Chicago to face the White Sox for a three-game series at Rate Field. In game one, the Cubs took a 4–1 lead into the fifth before the White Sox drew within one and tied in the sixth. The Cubs exploded for six runs in the seventh and eighth to put the game out of reach, notching a 10–5 win. Carson Kelly drove in four runs while five other Cubs each drove in a run. The win moved the Cubs to 29–16 on the season.
- **May 16** – In game two against the Sox, Jameson Taillon allowed five home runs and eight runs as the Cubs lost 8–3. Pete Crow-Armstrong and Miguel Amaya homered for the Cubs in the loss.
- **May 17** – In the final game of the series against the Sox, the Cubs took a 3–0 lead on a Michael Busch homer and a wild pitch that scored a run. Cubs starter Colin Rae allowed a run in second before Alex Bregman returned the lead to three in the fourth. However, Rea surrendered three runs in the next two inning to leave the game tied at four. Phi Maton allowed a three-run homer in the eighth to give the Sox a 7–4 lead. In the ninth, Michael Conforto hit a three-run homer to tie it and force extra innings. The Cubs pushed across a run in the top of the 10th before Ryan Rolison allowed a two-run homer to give the Sox the walk-off win. The loss dropped the Cubs to 29–18 on the season, but they remained 1.5 games ahead of second in the division.
- **May 18** – The Cubs returned home to face the second-place Milwaukee Brewers. Shota Imanaga allowed eight runs in 4.1 innings as the Cubs were blown out 9–3. Dansby Swanson hit a two-run homer for the Cubs in the loss.
- **May 19** – The next day, Ben Brown allowed three runs in five innings while the Cub offense continued to struggle, managing only two runs against the Brewers. The 5–2 loss marked the Cubs fourth straight and dropped them out of first place in the division.
- **May 20** – The Cub offense continued to struggle as the Brewers shut out the Cubs 5–0. The Cubs were held to two hits while committing three errors in the game. The sweep dropped the Cubs to 29–21 on the season and they fell 1.5 games behind the Brewers in the division.
- **May 22** – After an off day, the Houston Astros came to Wrigley. Jameson Taillon allowed four runs in 4.2 innings as the Cubs lost their sixth straight, 4–2. Pete Crow-Armstrong homered for the Cubs in the loss.
- **May 23** – In game two, the Cubs were shut out by the Astros 3–0. The loss was the Cubs seventh straight, their longest losing streak since 2022.
- **May 24** – In the finale of the home series, Shota Imanaga allowed 7 runs in six innings against the Astros. The Cub offense managed five runs and Michael Busch homered, but it was not enough as the lost their eighth straight game including all six on the homestand. The 8–5 loss dropped the Cubs to 29–24 on the season.
- **May 25** – Looking to avoid their ninth straight loss, the Cubs travelled to Pittsburgh to face the Pirates on Memorial Day. Ben Brown pitched six innings while allowing only one run and left with the game tied at one on a Michael Busch homer. However, Trent Thornton allowed a solo home run in the seventh as the Cubs lost again. The ninth straight loss dropped the Cubs to 3.5 games out of the division lead.
- **May 26** – Jordan Wicks got the start for the Cubs, replacing the injured Edward Cabrera. Wicks allowed eight runs (five in the first inning) over 4.1 innings as the Cubs were blown out by the Pirates 12–1. The loss was the Cubs' 10th in a row, making the Cubs only the second team to have two 10-game winning streaks and a 10-game losing streak in the same season.
- **May 27** – In game three against the Pirates, the Cubs took an early 3–0 lead, but quickly surrendered that lead and the game moved to the seventh tied at four. The Cubs blew the game open in the seventh, scoring six runs on a three-run homer by Ian Happ and a two-run shot by Michael Conforto. Happ drove in five runs in the game as the Cubs snapped their 10-game losing streak to move to 30–26 on the season.
- **May 28** – In the finale of the series with the Pirates, the Cubs pushed across three runs, one earned, against Paul Skenes. Colin Rea allowed two runs in 5.1 innings and the game remainined close until eighth. Ian Happ homered again and a run scored on a passed ball to push the lead to 6–2. The Cubs added a run in the ninth to secure the 7–2 win, their second straight.
- **May 29** – The Cubs next travelled to St. Louis to face the Cardinals. In the first game, Shota Imanaga allowed five runs in 5.1 innings as the Cubs lost 6–5. Ian Happ homered and drove in three in the loss.
- **May 30** – In game two, Pete Crow-Armstrong had four hits including a home run and drove in two as the Cubs beat the Cardinals 6–1. Ben Brown allowed only one run in seven innings of work to get the win.
- **May 31** – The finale of the series marked the Cubs first appearance on Sunday Night Baseball on NBC. Jordan Wicks, in his second start, allowed three runs in two innings. Ethan Roberts allowed two more runs in an inning of relief as the Cubs lost 5–1. Alex Bregman homered for the Cubs' lone run. The loss dropped the Cubs to 32–28 on the season, leaving them in fourth place in the division, 5.5 games behind the Brewers.

==== June ====
- **June 2** – The Cubs returned home to face the Athletics. Jameson Taillon allowed two runs in 6.1 innings, but the Cubs managed only one run on a groundout in the first. In the bottom of the ninth, still trailing by one, the first two Cub batters of the inning got on base, but two popouts and a strikeout ended the game.
- **June 3** – The next day, Seiya Suzuki and Pete Crow-Armstrong homered for the Cubs to give them a 4–2 lead. However, in the eighth, Caleb Thielbar allowed a two-run home run to tie the game. In the 10th, the Athletics scored their automatic runner, but the Cubs could not. As a result, the Cubs lost 5–4. The loss dropped the Cubs to two games over .500 on the season. Ian Happ collected his 1,000th hit of his career in the game, all with the Cubs.
- **June 4** – In the final game of the series against the A's, Shota Imanaga allowed six runs on four home runs, one on an inside-the-park home run that Pete Crow Armstrong was unable to see, in six plus innings. The Cub offense continued to struggle, scoring only one run through six innings. Entering the bottom of the seventh, the Cubs trailed 6–1. In the seventh, the Cubs scored two on an Ian Happ homer. Still trailing 6–3 entering the ninth, Michael Busch and Ian Happ doubled to score a run. Moisés Ballesteros reached on an infield single to score another and pull the Cubs within one. With two outs, Dansby Swanson singled to drive in the tying run and Crow-Armstrong blooped a single to right to score the winning run. The 7–6 win ended the Cubs eight-game losing streak at Wrigley Field.
- **June 5** – Edward Cabrera returned from the injured list and allowed eight runs on three home runs in 3.1 innings of work against the San Francisco Giants. The Cubs allowed seven homers in the game as they were blown out 18–3.
- **June 6** – In game two against the Giants, Ben Brown pitched 5.1 scoreless innings. Caleb Thielbar allowed a home run in the sixth, but Pete Crow-Armstrong homered in the bottom half of the inning to tie the game. In the ninth, the Giants took the lead again on a sacrifice fly before Crow-Armstrong his second homer of the gane, this with two outs in the bottom of the ninth to force extra innings. Michael Busch singled in the bottom of the 10th allowing the automatic runner to score to give the Cubs the 3–2 win. The win moved the Cubs to 34–31 on the season.
- **June 7** – In the finale of the three-game series against the Giants, Jameson Taillon left in the second with a hamstring issue after allowing a run in the first. Javier Assad pitched 6.1 innings of scoreless relief. Moisés Ballesteros tied the game in the third with an RBI single, but the game went to extras tied at one. The Giants drove in their automatic runner in the top of the 10th, but, with Pete Crow-Armstrong at third and one out, Michael Busch and Alex Bregman popped out to end the game.
- **June 9** – After an off day, the Cubs faced the Colorado Rockies, losers of four straight games and 18 games under .500, at Coors Field. Colin Rea allowed seven runs 4.2 innings and the Cub offense managed only three runs as the Cubs lost 7–3. Michael Busch homered in the loss. The loss dropped the Cubs to one game over .500 and left them eight games out of first in the division.
- **June 10** – In game two against the Rockies, the Cubs took a 1–0 lead on a Moisés Ballesteros groundout. Shota Imanaga pitched five scoreless innings, but Jacob Webb allowed two runs in the eighth to give the Rockies a 2–1 lead. Ian Happ homered to tie the game in the top of the ninth, but Daniel Palencia walked the first batter he faced and gave up back-to-back singles to give the Rockies the walk-off 3–2 win. The loss dropped the Cubs to .500 on the season for the first time since April 15.
- **June 11** – In the finale against the Rockies, Seiya Suzuki hit a grand slam in the fourth while Alex Bregman and Carson Kelly also homered to give the Cubs the 9–3 win. Edward Cabrera pitched 5.1 innings while allowing only two runs in the win.
- **June 12** – The Cubs next travelled to San Francisco to face the Giants. Javier Assad pitched six scoreless innings while Michael Busch hit a three-run homer to give the Cubs the 5–1 win. Seiya Suzuki and Nico Hoerner each drove in a run in the win.
- **June 13** – In game two against the Giants, Pete Crow-Armstrong hit a homer on the first pitch of the game while Ian Happ and Pedro Ramirez also homered for the Cubs. Ben Brown allowed only one run over five innings as the Cubs won 6–1. The win was their third straight wing and their first series win since early May.
- **June 14** – In the final game against the Giants, the Cubs managed only one run on an error and lost 5–1. Colin Rea allowed four runs in 4.2 innings in the loss. The loss dropped the Cubs to 37–35 on the season, 7.5 games out of the division lead.
- **June 15** –The Cubs returned to Wrigley to face the Rockies for a three-game series. In game one, Pete Crow-Armstrong homered to lead off the first and 1–0 lead held until the sixth. Shota Imanaga allowed only run in 5.2 innings, but the game was tied entering the bottom of the sixth. Matt Shaw doubled in a run to give the Cubs another one-run lead. However, Caleb Thielbar allowed a three-run homer in the eighth to give the Rockies a 4–2 lead. Crow-Armstrong drove in a run on a sacrifice fly in the eighth. Still trailing by a run in the ninth, Pedro Ramirez drove in a run to tie the game before Shaw walked with the bases loaded to give the Cubs the 5–4 win.
- **June 16** – In game two, Edward Cabrera allowed five runs in 4.1 innings before leaving with a hand issue. Pete Crow-Armstrong homered to lead off tor the Cubs for the third time in four games, but they only managed one more run and lost 5–2.
- **June 17** – In the final game of the series, the Cubs scored seven runs in the second on a triple by Matt Shaw, doubles by Carson Kelly and Seiya Suzuki, and a two-run homer by Dansby Swanson. Javier Assad pitched well, allowing only two runs in 5.2 innings. The Cub bullpen surrendered four runs, but held on for the 8–6 win marking the team's second straight series win. The Cubs moved to 39–36 on the season, still eight games behind the Brewers.
- **June 19** – The Toronto Blue Jays next came to face the Cubs at Wrigley Field. In the first game, the Cusbs cored seven runs in the first on a double by Seiya Suzuki, a grand slam by Carson Kelly, and a single by Alex Bregman. The Cubs added four in the sixth and five in the seventh to blow out the Jays 16–2. Ben Brown pitched six innings while allowing only two runs and the Cub bullpen held the Blue Jays scoreless. Kelly had six RBIs in the game and outfielder Justin Dean notched his first major league hit, a three-run triple in the seventh.
- **June 20** – In game two against the Jays, the Cubs took another early lead, scoring three in the second on a Matt Shaw homer. Pete Crow-Armstrong hit his 16th homer of the year, a two-run homer in the sixth to stretch the lead to five. However, the Cubs bullpen fell apart, allow eight runs between three pitches as the Cubs lost 8–6. The loss dropped the Cubs to 40–37 on the season.
- **June 23** – After the final game of the Jays' series was rained out, the Cubs travelled to face the Mets only to have the first game of the series also rained out. The first game of the series began with the Cubs jumping out to a 5–0 lead in the top of the second on an RBI-walk by Carson Kelly, a sacrifice fly by Dansby Swanson, and a three-run homer by Pete Crow Armstrong. Edward Carbrera allowed two runs in the bottom of the second and then left the game making the final out at first in the fifth inning after hurting his left leg. Swanson homered in the fourth to push the lead to 7–2 and drove in another run in the eighth on a double. The Mets scored three in the ninth, but it was not enough as the Cubs won 9–6. Swanson had four RBIs in the game while Carson Kelly added two.
- **June 24** – In game one of the day-night doubleheader to make up for the rainout, Javier Assad allowed three runs in the fourth. However, Dansby Swanson hit two homers, a three-run shot and a grand slam, driving in seven runs as the Cubs blew out the Mets 10–3. Michael Busch also homered and drove in two in the win. In game two, Swanson drove in four more runs, making 11 for the day and the Cubs won again, beating the Mets 10–5 and sweeping the doubleheader. Shota Imanaga allowed four runs in 5.1 innings of work to get the win. The Mets hit four home runs, but committed six errors in the game. Pedro Ramirez drove in two runs in the win. The win moved the Cubs to 43–37 and left them seven games out of the division lead.
- **June 25** – In the final game of the series against the Mets, Mathew Boyd made his first since May, pitching 4.2 innings and allowing no runs. The Cubs took the lead in the sixth on RBI hits by Michael Conforto, Alex Bregman, and Ian Happ. The Mets narrowed the lead to one in the sixth on a two-run homer and then tied it in the seventh on another homer. The game remained tied until the 10th when Pete Crow-Armstrong doubled to drive in the automatic runner. Jacob Webb prevented the Mets from scoring in the bottom of the 10th to give the Cubs the 4–3 win and a sweep of the four-game series.
- **June 26** – The Cubs next faced the division-leading Brewers in Milwaukee. In the first game, Colin Rea five inning while allowing only one run and left with the game tied at one. However, the Cub bullpen fell apart, allowing five runs as the Cubs lost 6–2. Seiya Suzuki drove in both runs for the Cubs with a homer in the fifth and a sacrifice fly in the eighth.
- **June 27** – In game two, newly acquired David Peterson pitched 5.2 innings while allowing only two runs against the Brewers. Four Cub relievers shut out the Brewers for the remainder of the game while Seiya Suzuki, Ian Happ, and Michael Conforto each homered as the Cubs won easily 8–2.
- **June 28** – In the series finale, Ryan Rolison got the start as an opener and allowed a solo homer in the second. Newly acquired Bryse Wilson pitched 4.1 scoreless innings and game remained tied into the 10th. After a bases loaded walk gave the Cubs the 2–1 lead, Seiya Suzuki drove in two with a single. In the bottom of the 10th, the Brewers scored two runs to narrow the lead to 4–3 before Jordan Wicks induced a game-ending double play to secure the series win for the Cubs. The win moved the Cubs to 46–38 on the season, 5.5 games behind the Brewers in the division. The win gave the Cubs a 6–1 road trip and marked their 12 win in the prior 16 games.
- **June 29** – The Cubs returned to home to face the San Diego Padres in a three-game series. In game one with the wind blowing out, Shota Imanaga pitched well, allowing only two runs in 6.1 innings. The Cubs also scored two runs on RBIs by Michael Conforto and Seiya Suzuki. The game remained tied into the 10th before Michael Busch hit a fly ball to left that the Padres turned into a double play when Dansby Swanson was thrown out at home. With two outs and the bases loaded, Suzuki hit a ball off the wall in left to drive in the winning run and give the Cubs their 10th walk-off win of the season, the most in baseball.
- **June 30** – With the wind blowing out at Wrigley, the teams combined to hit nine home runs. Dansby Swanson hit two homers and drove in three while Alex Bregman, Michael Busch, and Pete Crow-Armstrong also homered for the Cubs. Matthew Boyd allowed three runs in five innings. Javier Assad allowed four in relief, but Tyler Ferguson and Ryan Rolison secured the 9–7 win for the Cubs. The win moved the Cubs back to 10 games over .500 and made them 14–4 in their prior 18 games.

==== July ====
- **July 1** – In the final game against the Padres, the Cubs pounded out eight homers and 23 runs, winning 23–3. Dansby Swanson homered three times including a grand slam and drove in eight. Michael Conforto also hit two homers while Pete Crow-Armstrong, Seiya Suzuki, and Michael Busch each homered. The 23 runs were the most runs the Cubs had scored on the season as they won their fifth straight game. In the last two games of the series, Swanson belted five home runs and drove in 11 runs.
- **July 3** – After an off day, the Cardinals came to town and blew out the Cubs 17–1. David Peterson allowed 10 runs in 3.2 innings and Bryse Wilson allowed seven in 3.1 innings in the blowout. Alex Bregman drove in the only run for the Cubs in the loss.
- **July 4** – On Independence Day, the start of the game was delayed an hour due to rain and had a later delay in the sixth due to a thick fog. Shota Imanaga allowed two runs in 4.2 innings as the Cubs were shutout by the Cardinals 3–0.
- **July 5** – In the series final against the Cardinals, Jaiver Assad allowed no runs in 4.2 innings of work and left with 2–0 lead. However, Tyler Ferguson allowed a three-run homer to surrender the lead. In the sixth, the Cubs retook the lead with the help of two Cardinal errors as they scored four runs. The Cubs held on for the 6–4 win and moved back to 10 games over .500 on the season.
- **July 6** – After another off day, the Cubs faced the Orioles in Baltimore. After a nearly hour-long rain delay where it did not rain, Matthew Boyd pitched six scoreless innings while allowing only three hits. Allex Bregman drove in two runs while three other Cubs had an RBI as the Cubs won 5–2.
- **July 7** – In game two against the Orioles, Colin Rea allowed three runs in 5.1 innings of work. The Cubs hit five home runs, two by Pete Crow-Armstrong, and took a 9–3 lead. The bullpen faltered, but held on for the 9–7 win. The win moved the Cubs to 52–40 on the season, winners of 12 of their prior 15 games. They remained six games behind the Brewers in the division, but held the top wild card spot by 1.5 games.
- **July 8** – In the series finale, David Peterson allowed two hits and one run, but left the game with the Cubs trailing 1–0. In the sixth, Seiya Suzuki homered to tie the game. In the eighth, Pete Crow-Armstrong doubled and scored on a Suzuki double to give the Cubs a 2–1 lead. However, the Cub bullpen surrendered two runs in the bottom of the eighth as the Cubs lost 3–2.
- **July 10** – After another off day, the Cubs faced the Reds in Cincinnati. The Cubs were shutout 4–0. Shota Imanaga allowed one run in five innings in the loss.
- **July 11** – In the second game against the Reds, Javier Assad allowed two runs in five innings. The Cubs took the lead in the top of the sixth on a Carson Kelly homer and an Ian Happ double. However, Drew Pomeranz, back with the Cubs, allowed a homer in the bottom of the sixth to tie the game at three. In the seventh, Alex Bregman hit a two-run homer to give the Cubs a two-run lead. Four Cub relievers held the Reds scoreless from there as the Cubs notched their 53rd win of the season, winning 5–3.
- **July 12** – In the final game before the All-Star break, the Cubs took an early lead in the first, but the Reds went up by two in third. A Kevin Alcántara single in the fourth tied the game at four. Pete Crow-Armstrong gave the Cubs the lead in the seventh with a single and Alex Bregman hit his second homer in as many days, a three-run shot, that gave the Cubs and 8–4 win. The Cubs finished the first half of the season 12 games over .500, half a game up in the wild card race, and trailing the Brewers by five games in the division.
- **July 17** – In the first game after the All-Star break, Colin Rea allowed four runs in six innings while the Cubs managed only two runs against the Minnesota Twins. The 5–2 loss dropped the Cubs to 11 games over .500.
- **July 18** – In game two against the Twins, the Cubs celebrated the 2016 World Championship team. Matthew Boyd allowed only one run in six innings while Michael Busch homered in the first and former Cub Anthony Rizzo ended up with the ball in right field. Pedro Ramirez drove in two runs while Nico Hoerner had four hits as the Cubs beat the Twins 6–2.
- **July 19** – Shota imanaga threw seven shutout innings as the Cubs clobbered the Twins 10–1. Nico Hoerner drove in four runs while Alex Bregman homered and drove in two in the win. The win moved the Cubs to 56–43 on the season.
- **July 20** – Jameson Taillon returned from the injured list for the Cubs and allowed four runs on two homers in the first as the Detroit Tigers took a 4–0 lead. The Cubs narrowed the lead to one on homers by Seiya Suzuki and Michael Busch, but the Tigers extended the lead to two in the top of the eighth. In the bottom of the eighth, Ian Happ hit a two-run home run to tie the game at five. In the bottom of the ninth, Dansby Swanson led off with a double, but Suzuki and Alex Bregman struck out with Swanson at third to force extra innings. The Cubs allowed three runs in the top of the 10th as they lost 8–6.
- **July 21** – In game two against the Tigers, the Cubs scored six runs in the first while David Peterson pitched 6.2 innings without allowing a run. Michael Conforto hit a two-run homer and Seiya Suzuki drove in two runs as the Cubs blew out the Tigers 11–2.
- **July 22** – In the final game of the series with the Tigers, Colin Rea allowed four runs in five innings and the Cubs managed only a Seiya Suzuki home run as they lost 5–1. They dropped to 57–45 on the season, seven games behind the Brewers in the division, and 1.5 games in the lead for the top wild card spot.
- **July 24** – After an off day, the Cubs faced the Pirates in Pittsburgh. Matthew Boyd pitched seven solid innings, allowing only one run. Pete Crow-Armstrong homered in the sixth to tie the game at one. The game went to extra innings and Dansby Swanson and Seiya Suzuki each drove in a run in the top of the tenth. Gavin Hollowell allowed only the automatic runner to score as the Cubs won 3–2.
- **July 25** – In game two against the Pirates, Shota Imanaga faced off against Paul Skenes. Imanaga pitched six scoreless innings while the Cubs scored five off of Skenes. Pete Crow-Armstrong homered for the second consecutive day and had four hits and the three RBI. Three other Cubs drove in two runs each as the Cubs blew out the Pirates 11–0.
- **July 26** – The next day, Jameson Taillon allowed seven runs in three innings as the Cubs fell behind 7–1. The Cubs drew to within four in the fourth on RBI by Carson Kelly, Pedro Ramirez, and a triple by Pete Crow-Armstrong. Seiya Suzuki homered in the ninth to draw within one, but the Cubs lost to the Pirates 8–7. The loss dropped the Cubs to 59–46 on the season, but they remained well ahead in the wild card chase.
- **July 27** – The Cubs next faced the Cardinals in St. Louis for a four-game series. In the first game, Alex Bregman homered and doubled twice among his four hits while driving in two runs. Nico Hoerner also homered and four hits while driving in four runs in the 7–3 win. David Peterson allowed only two runs in 5.2 innings in the win.
- **July 28** – In game two against the Cardinals, the Cubs scored two in the first and five in the second to take a seven-run lead. Colin Rea allowed only one run in six innings as the Cubs won easily 10–2. Ian Happ, Nico Hoerner, and Seiya Suzuki each drove in two runs as the Cubs pounded out 17 hits, but no homers against the Cardinals. The win moved the Cubs to 15 games over .500 on the season.
- **July 29** – After scoring 17 runs in the first two games of the series, the Cubs went scoreless in the first nine innings of game three. However, Matthew Boyd and two relievers combined to shutout the Cardinals as well, so the game went to extras with a 0–0 score. In the top of the 10th, Pete Crow-Armstrong, who was hitless in the series, drilled a two-run homer to give the Cubs a 2–0 lead. However, in the bottom of the 10th, Trent Thornton allowed three runs as the Cardinals rallied for a 3–2 win.
- **July 30** – In series finale against the Cardinals, Javier Assad allowe only one run in 4.1 innings of work. The Cubs took a 2–1 lead in the seventh on a single by Michael Busch, but Caleb Thielbar allowed a run in the bottom of the inning to tie the game at two. The game went to extra innings still tied at two. In the 10th, Alex Bregman and Ian Happ hit back-to-back doubles to give the Cubs the 4–2 win.
- **July 31** – The Cubs returned to Wrigley to face the New York Yankees. Shota Imanaga pitched 6.2 innings and allowed only two runs. However, the Cub offense managed only five hits and were shut out 2–0. The Cubs finished July with a 62–48 record on the season.

==== August ====
- **August 1** – In game two against the Yankees, David Peterson allowed two runs in 6.1 innings and left with the Cubs trailing 2–1. However, in the seventh, Nico Hoerner homered to tie the game. Still in the seventh, Pete Crow-Armstrong drove in the go-ahead run on a triple and scored on a Seiya Suzuki single to give the Cubs a 4–2 lead. Michael Busch drove in an insurance run in the eighth as the Cubs won 5–2.
- **August 2** – In the series finale with the Yankees, Colin Rea allowed two runs in six innings, but the Cubs managed only one run as they lost 2–1. The loss dropped the Cubs to 63–49 on the season, but they remained in the top spot for the wild card.
- **August 3** – The Dodgers next visited Wrigley for a three-game series. Matthew Boyd allowed a three-run homer less than 10 pitches in to the game, but the Cubs stormed back to take the lead on two-run homers by Seiya Suzuki, Kevin Alcántara, and Carson Kelly. Michael Busch also homered and drove in the three as the Cubs won 10–5.
- **August 4** – In game two with the Dodgers, newly acquired Tarik Skubal got the start for the Dodgers. Skubal allowed two runs in six innings including a home run by Dansby Swanson. Javier Assad pitched 5.2 innings while allowing only one run. The Cub bullpen shut out the Dodgers from there as Pete Crow-Armstrong hit a two-run home run and Nico Hoerner homered and drove in two to give the Cubs the 5–1 win.
- **August 5** – In the series finale, Pete Crow-Armstrong homered twice and drove four runs as the Cubs took a 7–1 lead in to the eighth. The Dodgers scored five in the eighth to narrow the lead to one, but Jacob Webb pitched a perfect ninth to give the Cubs the 7–6 win and the series sweep. Shota Imanaga allowed one run in five innings to get the win. Shohei Ohtani homered twice in the game for the Dodgers.
- **August 6** – In a makeup of a previously rained out game, the Blue Jays came to town. David Peterson allowed one run in five innings, but the Cubs failed to score through eight. Trailing 2–0 with two outs in the bottom of the ninth, Alex Bregman hit a two-run homer to tie the game. Neither team scored in the 10th. In the bottom of the 11th, Pete Crow-Armstrong singled, but Carson Kelly was thrown out trying to score. With Crow-Armstrong at second, the Jays intentionally waked Seiya Suzuki before Crow-Armstrong stole third. The throw to third was high and Crow-Armstrong scored on the error to give the Cubs their fourth straight win. The win moved the Cubs to a season-high 18 games over .500.
- **August 7** – The next day, the Cubs faced the Royals in Kansas City. Newly acquired Kevin Gausman made the start for the Cubs and pitched seven innings while allowing only two runs. Seiya Suzuki and Pete Crow-Armstrong drove in two runs each and Pedro Ramirez homered as the Cubs won easily 7–2. The win moved them to 68–49 on the season.
- **August 8** – In the second game against the Royals, the Cubs other newly acquired starting pitcher Clay Holmes got the start. Holmes allowed four runs in four innings as the Cubs could only manage three runs. Colin Real allowed two runs in four innings of relief and the Cubs lost 6–3.
- **August 9** – In their final game of 17 games in 17 days, the Cubs routed the Royals, pounding out 18 hits and scoring 10 runs. Ian Happ homered for the second consecutive game and Miguel Amaya added a three-run homer. Four Cubs drove in at least two runs in the rout. The win left the Cubs six games up in the wild card race and 5.5 behind the Brewers in the division.
- **August 11** – After an off day, the Cubs faced the Nationals in Washington, D.C. Shota Imanage allowed four runs on three homers but the Cubs homered three times as well. Pete Crow-Armstrong hit a solo shot, his 27th of the season, while Seiya Suzuki, and Alex Bregman also homered. Suzuki drove in two while six other Cubs drove in a run. The Cub bullpen held on for the 8–6 win with Jacob Webb notching a four-out save. The win moved the Cubs to a season-high 20 games over .500 and pulled them to within four games of the division lead.
- **August 12** – In the second game against the Nationals, Alex Bregman hit a career-high three home runs and drove in a career-high seven runs in the game as the Cubs trounced Washington 12–6. Dansby Swanson also homered for the Cubs while David Peterson got the win, pitching five innings and allowing four runs. Javier Assad pitched four innings in relief for the save. The win drew the Cubs to within three games of the Brewers in the division.
- **August 13** – In the series finale against the Nationals, the Cubs managed only one hit and three baserunners as they lost 7–0. Kevin Gausman allowed six runs in 4.2 inning of work in the loss.
- **August 14** – The Cubs returned to Wrigley to face the Cardinals. Clay Holmes pitched 6.2 scoreless innings, allowing only one hit and walk. The Cub offense was also held in check until the sixth when Seiya Suzuki hit a three-run homer to give the Cubs the lead. Holmes and three relievers shut the Cardinals out from there as the Cubs won 3–0.
- **August 15** – In game two against the Cardinals, Matthew Boyd allowed seven runs in 5.1 innings as the Cubs lost 8–4. Michael Conforto hit a three-run homer in the loss. In the game, Cardinals outfielder Joshua Báez set a major-league record by homering in his first three at-bats as a Major Leaguer.
- **August 16** – In the series finale, Edward Cabrera returned from in the injured list and gave up seven runs in 3.2 innings. The Cubs managed four runs, two on a Pete Crow-Armstrong homer as they were blown out 11–4. The loss dropped the Cubs to 72–53 on the season and left them five games behind the Brewers.
- **August 17** – The next day, the crosstown rival White Sox came to Wrigley. Pete Crow-Armstrong homered on the first pitch of the bottom of the first and Seiya Szuki followed with another homer to give the Cubs a 2–0 lead. Shota Imanaga allowed a three-run homer in the fourth, but left with the lead after the Cubs scored two runs on two errors by the Sox in the fifth. However, Ryan Zeferjahn allowed a two-run, pinch-hit home run in the eighth as the Sox took the lead. Nico Hoerner drove in the tying run in the ninth before Crow-Armstrong hit his first career walk-off home run in the 10th to give the Cubs the 7–5 win. The homers by Crow-Armstrong marked the first time a Cub had led off a game and then ended the same game with home runs. The two homers also put Crow-Armstrong at 30 home runs, putting him in the 30/30 club for the second straight year - the first time a Cub had done so in back-to-back seasons.
- **August 18** – Pete Crow-Armstrong led off the next game with a homer to set a major league record, becoming the first play to hit two leadoff home runs and a walk-off home run in a two-game span. Despite that, the Cubs trailed 3–2 entering the seventh before Alex Bregman drove in the tying run. After a leadoff double in the bottom of the ninth, the Sox chose to walk Crow-Armstrong, but Bregman made them pay, driving in Kelly for the walk-off win. The win moved the Cubs to 74–53 on the season.
- **August 19** – In the final game against the Sox, Clay Holmes allowed one run 5.1 innings. That was enough for the White Sox as the Cubs managed only two hits and lost 3–0.
- **August 21** – After an off day, the Cubs traveled to face the Seattle Mariners. In game one, Matthew Boyd allowed five runs in six innings of work after Pete Crow-Armstrong and Alex Bregman had give the Cubs a 3–0 lead with homers in the first. The Cubs trailed 5–3 in the eight before Ian Happ homered to pull within one run. In the top of the ninth, Bregman hit his second homer of the game to tie the game at five. The game went to extra innings and the Mariners drove in the winning run off of Ryan Zeferjahn, marking the second consecutive loss for the Cubs.
- **August 22** – In game two in Seattle, David Peterson allowed two runs in six innings and left 4–2 Cub lead after homers by Alex Bregman and Michael Busch. Kevin Alcántara and Tryone Taylor also drove in runs for the Cubs. However, in the bottom of the ninth, Jacob Webb allowed three runs and the game-winning homer to Randy Arozarena.
- **August 23** – In the series finale against the Mariners, Shota Imanaga pitched only two innings and allowing two runs. The Cubs pounded out 17 hits including grand slams by Ian Happ and Pedro Ramirez. Michael Conforto and Pete Crow-Armstrong also homered for the Cubs as they won easily 19–2. Happ and Ramirez each drove in five runs. The win moved the Cubs 75–56 on the season, leaving them six games behind the Brewers in the division.
- **August 24** – The Cubs next traveled to face the Diamondbacks in Phoenix. Kevin Gausman pitched seven shutout innings while Michael Conforto and Carson Kelly each homered. The Cubs won easily 7–0.
- **August 25** – In game two against the D-Backs, Clay Holmes pitched seven scoreless innings while Ian Happ hit a three-run homer. With the Cubs ahead 4–0 in the eighth, Daniel Palencia, in his second appearance after returning from injury, allowed three runs before Jacob Webb got the final out in the eighth. In the ninth, Webb allowed a pinch-hit two-run homer with two outs to give the Cubs the 5–4 loss.
- **August 26** – In the final game in Arizona, Michael Busch continued the Cubs strong streak of starting pitching, allowing only one run in six innings. However, the Cub offense could muster nothing as the Cubs were shutout 2–0. The second straight loss left the Cubs 18 games over .500, 6.5 games behind the Brewers in the division.
- **August 28** – After an off day, the Cubs returned home to face the Reds at Wrigley Field. In the first game, David Peterson allowed two runs in five innings and left with the Cubs leading 3–2. However, Trent Thornton allowed five runs in 2/3 of an innings as the Cubs lost 10–8. Michael Busch and Pedro Ramirez homered for the Cubs in the 10–8 loss.
- **August 29** – In game two against the Reds, Pete Crow-Armstrong hit three home runs in a game for the first time in his career. Three other Cubs homered as the Cubs blew out the Reds 17–5. Kevin Gausman got the win despite allowing five runs in five innings. Crow-Armstrong had four hits and drove in six in the easy win.
- **August 30** – In the final game of the series against the Reds, Pete Crow-Armstrong homered two more times, but Shota Imanaga allowed six runs and three homers as the Cubs lost 7–5. The loss left the Cubs eight games behind the Brewers in the division.
- **August 31** – The next day, the Cubs started a four-game series against the division-leading Brewers at Wrigley. In game one, Clay Holmes pitched six scoreless innings while the Cub offense set multiple home run records. Alex Bregman hit his second three-homer game in a month as the Cubs totaled nine home runs in the game, a franchise record. The Cubs also notched 62 homers in August, the most by any National League team in a month. The Cubs routed the Brewers 17–3 to move within seven games in the division. Six other Cubs homered in the game including Tyrone Taylor, hitting his first as a Cub.

==== September ====
- **September 1** – In game two against the Brewers, Matthew Boyd allowed three runs in 5.1 innings while the Cub bullpen allowed four more runs. Tyrone Taylor drove in two on an RBI double, but the Cubs lost 9–4.
- **September 2** – In game three against the Brewers, David Peterson allowed three runs in the first two innings, but the Cubs scored five off of Milwaukee Ace Jacob Misiorowski and led 5–3 going into the fourth. Petereson allowed three more runs as the Brewers took the 6–5 lead. From there, the Cubs were held scoreless as they lost again 9–5. The loss dropped the to nine games behind the Brewers in the division and dropped them out of the top wild car spot.
- **September 3** – In the last game of the series against the Brewers, Kevin Gausman pitched seven innings while allowing only one run. Pete Crow-Armstrong hit his 39th homer of the season to drive in both Cub runs as they held on for the 2–1 win.
- **September 4** – The Cubs took to the road to face the Marlins in Miami. Shota Imanaga pitched six innings while allowing only one run. Pedro Ramirez drove in two runs while Pete Crow Armstrong stole his 33rd base of the season. Aaron Civale pitched three innings of relief to earn the save as the Cubs won 6–1.
- **September 5** – In game two against the Marlins, the Cubs took a 4–0 lead, but Javier Assad allowed three runs in 4.2 innings. The Cubs held on for the 6–5 win while Ian Happ drove in two runs and Michael Conforto homered.
- **September 6** – Clay Holmes allowed eight runs in 4.1 innings of work against the Marlins and the Cubs lost 10–3. Pete Crow-Armstrong hit his 40th homer of the season, the first Cub to hit 40 in a season since Derrek Lee in 2005. It was not enough as the Cubs were blown out 10–3.
- **September 7** – The Cubs next faced the Brewers in Milwaukee. Matthew Boyd pitched seven innings, but allowed the first two batters on base in the eighth. The Cub bullpen could not keep the runners from scoring as the Cubs 2–1 lead turned into a 4–2 deficit. Pete Crow-Armstrong notched his 41st homer of the season in the ninth, but it was not enough as the Cubs lost 4–3. Crow-Armstrong also stole two bases, marking 35 on the season and pulling him to within five stolen bases of the 40–40 club. The loss dropped the Cubs 81–64 on the season, eight games behind the Brewers in the division and half a game behind the Phillies for the top wild card spot.
- **September 8** – The next day, each team scored a run in the first and neither team scored again until Carson Kelly doubled in two runs in the top of the ninth. Jacob Webb allowed a two-run homer in the bottom of the ninth to force extra innings. In the 10th, Alex Bregman hit a fly ball that was caught and Seiya Suzuki was out trying to advance to third. The Cubs failed to score in the 10th as a result and the Brewers won it on a single in the bottom of the ninth. Pete Crow-Armstrong stole his 36th base in the game.
- **September 9** – In the final regular season game against the Brewers, the Cubs fell behind and trailed 8–1 entering the ninth. They managed to push across five runs in the ninth, but it was not enough as the Cubs lost and were swept in the series. The loss removed any real chance at the division as the lead ballooned to 10 games with 15 remaining. The Cubs fell 1.5 games behind the Phillies for the first wild card spot and only 2.5 games ahead of the final wild card spot.
- **September 11** – After an off day, the Cubs played the Pirates at Wrigley Field. Alex Bregman homered and drove in two while Carson Kelly also drove in two runs. Michael Busch added two hits and drove in three as the Cubs won easily 12–2, ending their four-game losing streak.
- **September 12** – The next day, the Cubs took a 2–0 lead on homers by Michael Busch and Pedro Ramirez. However, Clay Holmes allowed a three-run homer in the sixth to give the Pirates a 3–2 lead. In the bottom of the eighth, Matt Shaw walked with the bases loaded to tie the game before Nico Hoerner was hit with the bases still loaded to give the Cubs the 4–3 win.
- **September 13** – In the finale of the series against the Pirates, Matthew Boyd allowed four runs in 5.1 innings. Miguel Amaya homered and drove in two runs, but the Cubs lost 4–3.
- **September 14** – The Atlanta Braves next came to town as the Cubs remained tied with the Phillies for the top wild card spot. Pete Crow-Armstrong stole his 37th base of the year before hitting his 42nd home run on the season. Crow-Armstrong drove in four runs in the game, putting him at 102 RBI on the season. David Peterson allowed only one run in six innings and the Cubs won easily 7–3. With the Phillies idle, the Cubs took a half game lead in the wild card race.
- **September 15** – In game two against the Braves, Kevin Gausman allowed two runs in 5.2 innings and left with a 3–0 lead. However, Jacob Webb allowed a two-run homer in the sixth and Edward Cabrera, returning from the IL in a relief role, allowed a two-run homer in the seventh as the Cubs lost 6–3. The Phillies also lost, so the Cubs remained up a half game in the wild card.
- **September 16** – In the final game against the Braves, Pete Crow-Armstrong hit two home runs, moving him to 44 on the season as the Cubs jumped out to a 6–0 lead. Shota Imanaga allowed one run in six innings while the Cub bullpen surrendered four runs. It was not enough to catch the Cubs as they won 8–4. The 44 homers for Crow-Armstrong set a team record for home runs by a left-hander in a season.
- **September 18** – After an off day, the Cubs faced the Reds in Cincinnati. Clay Holmes allowed six runs in 5.1 innings while Ian Happ homered and Seiya Suzuki drove in two runs. It was not enough as the Cubs lost 6–4. The loss moved the Cubs into a three-way tie for the final wild card spots with the Phillies and Padres.
- **September 19** – The next day, Matthew Boyd allowed only two runs in five innings while the Cubs bullpen held the Reds scoreless. Dansby Swanson hit his first home run since returning from the injured list while Michael Bush also homered. The Cubs held on for a 5–2 win moving them a game ahead of the Phillies in the wild card race while remaining tied with the Padres.
- **September 20** – In the final game against the Reds, Pete Crow-Armstrong stole his 38th base of the season and notched three hits including his 45th homer of the season while driving in two. The home run tied him with Kyle Schwarber for the most in baseball. David Peterson allowed one run in six innings as the Cubs won easily 9–1. Pedro Ramirez also had three hits and drove in two runs in the game. Michael Conforto and Seiya Suzuki each homered in the game, but Alex Bregman left the game after getting hit in the face by a foul ball while waiting to bat. The win kept the Cubs tied with Padres for the wild card lead and moved their magic number to one to clinch a playoff spot.
- **September 22** – After an off day, the Cubs returned to Wrigley for the final regular season series of the year. Facing the Marlins, Shota Imanaga allowed one run in five innings while Aaron Civale allowed one run in the sixth. Trailing 2–0, the Cubs scored twice in the bottom of the sixth to tie the game. The game remained tied into extra innings where the Cubs had multiple opportunities to win the game in the 10th and 11th, but could not push across a run. The bullpen fell apart in the 12th, allowing six runs as the Cubs lost 8–2. The loss coupled with a Diamondbacks win prevented the Cubs from clinching a playoff berth. Pete Crow-Armstrong had two hits and stole his 39th base of the season, bringing him within one stolen base of the 40–40 club.
- **September 23** – Still looking to clinch a playoff berth, Kevin Gausman allowed two runs in 5.2 innings of work. Dansby Swanson drove in two runs to tie it, but the Marlins pushed across a run on a groundout in the seventh to retake the lead. The Cubs did nothing from there, losing again 3–2. The loss dropped the Cubs one game behind the Padres for the top wild card spot.
- **September 24** – In the final home game of the regular season, Matthew Boyd pitched seven innings and allowed only one run against the Marlins. Pete Crow-Armstrong walked in the first and stole his 40th base on the next pitch to become the seventh member of the 40–40 club and the first in franchise history. Seiya Suzki homered and Nico Hoerner singled in a run to give the Cubs the 2–1 win. The win secured the Cubs second straight playoff berth, both as a wild card team.
- **September 25** – The Cubs travelled to Boston to face the Red Sox for the final series of the regular season. Due to a Nor'easter impacting the region, the Red Sox announced the teams will play a split doubleheader on Friday. In game one, the Cubs took a 3–0 lead after two innings on RBI doubles by Tyrone Tayler and Miguel Amaya. Clay Holmes surrendered three runs in 4.1 innings as the Red Sox tied the game. Aaron Civale allowed an RBI double in the seventh as the Cubs lost 4–3. Alex Bregman returned from his injury, but did not get a hit in the loss. In game two, the Cubs were shut out 2–0. After the game, both teams flew to Tampa for the final game of the series to be played on Sunday.
- **September 27** – Before the final game of the season, the Cubs were locked into the second wild card spot and knew they would face the Padres in San Diego no matter the outcome of the final game. Alex Bregman had four hits, including two homers as the Cubs beat the Red Sox 6–2.

=== Transactions ===
==== March ====
March 23	Optioned RHP Javier Assad and OF Kevin Alcántara to Iowa.
March 24	Selected the contract of OF Dylan Carlson from Iowa. Placed IF Tyler Austin on 60-day IL.
March 25	Selected the contract of OF Michael Conforto and IF Scott Kingery from Iowa. Placed LHP Justin Steele on the 60-day IL. Placed RHP Porter Hodge and LHP Jordan Wicks on the 15-day IL retroactive to March 22. Placed OF Seiya Suzuki on the 10-day IL retroactive to March 22. Designated RHP Jack Neely for assignment.
March 28	Sent RHP Jack Neely outright to Iowa.

==== April ====
April 2	Signed free agent RHP Naikys Piedra.
April 5	Placed RHP Cade Horton on 15-day IL. Recalled RHP Riley Martin. Recalled RHP Ethan Roberts for doubleheader.
April 6	Placed LHP Matthew Boyd on 15-day IL retroactive to April 3. Recalled RHP Javier Assad from Iowa. Returned RHP Ethan Roberts to Iowa.
April 7	Signed free agent RHP Tyler Beede to a minor league contract.
April 10	Activated OF Seiya Suzuki from 10-day IL. Recalled RHP Ethan Roberts from Iowa. Designated OF Dylan Carlson for assignment. Placed RHP Phil Maton on 15-day IL retroactive to April 8.
April 12	Placed RHP Hunter Harvey on 15-day IL retroactive to April 9. Selected the contract of LHP Charlie Barnes from Iowa. Sent OF Dylan Carlson outright to Iowa.
April 13	Signed free agent OF Stharling De Los Santos to a minor league contract.
April 14	Recalled LHPs Luke Little and Ryan Rolison from Iowa. Placed RHP Ethan Roberts on 15-day IL retroactive to April 13. Optioned RHP Charlie Barnes to Iowa. Signed free agent RHP Paul Campbell to a minor league contract.
April 17	Placed RHP Daniel Palencia on 15-day IL retroactive to April 14.
April 18	Selected the contract of RHP Corbin Martin from Iowa. Transferred RHP Cade Horton to 60-day IL. Signed free agent OF Dylan Carlson to a minor league contract.
April 22	Activated LHP Matthew Boyd from 15-day IL. Optioned LHP Luke Little to Iowa.
April 23	Traded cash to Colorado Rockies for IF Nicky Lopez.
April 24	Placed LHP Caleb Thielbar on 15-day IL. Transferred RHP Porter Hodge to the 60-day IL. Designated IF Scott Kingery for assignment. Selected the contracts of RHP Vince Velasquez and IF Nicky Lopez from Iowa.
April 26	Placed LHP Riley Martin on 15-day IL. Recalled LHP Charlie Barnes from Iowa. Designated RHP Vince Velasquez for assignment. Selected the contract of RHP Yacksel Ríos from Iowa.
April 27	Activated RHP Phil Maton from 15-day IL. Optioned LHP Charlie Barnes to Iowa. Sent IF Scott Kingery outright to Iowa.
April 28	Claimed LHP Doug Nikhazy off waivers from the Chicago White Sox. Designated IF Ben Cowles for assignment. Optioned LHP Doug Nikhazy to Iowa. Sent RHP Vince Velasquez outright to Iowa.

==== May ====
May 3	Activated RHP Daniel Palencia from 15-day IL. Designated RHP Yacksel Rios for assignment. Claimed LHP Luis Peralta off waivers from St. Louis Cardinals. Optioned LHP Luis Peralta to Iowa. Sent IF Ben Cowles outright to Iowa.
May 4	Signed free agent RHP Vince Velasquez to a minor league contract.
May 6	Placed LHP Matthew Boyd on 15-day IL. Selected the contract of RHP Trent Thornton from Iowa. Designated LHP Charlie Barnes for assignment. Sent RHP Yackse Rios outright to Iowa.
May 7	Recalled RHP Gavin Hollowell from Iowa. Designated RHP Corbin Martin for assignment. Traded cash to Athletics for RHP Tyler Ferguson. Optioned RHP Tyler Ferguson to Iowa.
May 8	Optioned RHP Gavin Hollowell to Iowa. Activated RHP Ethan Roberts from 15-day IL.
May 10	Sent RHP Corbin Martin outright to Iowa.
May 11	Signed RHP Yacksel Rios to a minor league contract.
May 15	Activated LHP Jordan Wicks from 15-day IL. Optioned LHP Jordan Wicks to Iowa.
May 17	Selected the contract of LHP Ty Blach from Iowa. Optioned RHP Javier Assad to Iowa. Transferred RHP Hunter Harvey to 60-day IL. Claimed RHP Christian Roa off waivers from Baltimore Orioles. Optioned RHP Christian Roa to Iowa.
May 18	Signed free agents C Daniel Bastardo and RHP Alvin De Leon to minor league contracts.
May 19	Activated LHP Caleb Thielbar from 15-day IL. Designated LHP Ty Black for assignment.
May 22	Recalled IF Pedro Ramírez from Iowa. Placed OF Matt Shaw on the 10-day IL retroactive to May 20. Sent LHP Ty Blach outright to Iowa.
May 23	Recalled OF Kevin Alcántara from Iowa. Designated IF Nicky Lopez for assignment.
May 24	Placed RHP Edward Cabrera on 15-day IL retroactive to May 21. Recalled LHP Jordan Wicks from Iowa.
May 25	Sent IF Nicky Lopez outright to Iowa.
May 27	Signed free agent LHP Ty Blach to a minor league contract.
May 31	Signed free agent RHP Kippei Mikawa to a minor league contract

==== June ====
June 1	Signed free agent LHP Aaron Bummer to a minor league contract.
June 2	Optioned LHP Jordan Wicks to Iowa. Recalled RHP Tyler Ferguson from Iowa.
June 5	Activated RHP Edward Cabrera from 15-day IL. Optioned RHP Tyler Ferguson to Iowa.
June 6	Recalled RHP Javier Assad from Iowa. Optioned RHP Ethan Roberts to Iowa. Signed free agent RHP Andrew Wantz to a minor league contract.
June 7	Traded cash to Los Angeles Dodgers for LHP Antoine Kelly.
June 8	Selected the contract of LHP Antoine Kelly from Iowa. Claimed RHP Eduarniel Núñez off waivers from Baltimore Orioles.
June 9	Activated RF Matt Shaw from the 10-day IL. Optioned DH Kevin Alcántara to Iowa. Placed RHP Jameson Taillon on 15-day IL retroactive to June 8, 2026. Placed RHP Trent Thornton on the paternity list. Recalled RHPs Tyler Ferguson and RHP Ethan Roberts from Iowa.
June 12	Optioned RHP Tyler Ferguson to Iowa. Activated RHP Trent Thornton from the paternity list.
June 15	Traded cash to Seattle Mariners for RHP Yosver Zulueta. Designated LHP Doug Nikhazy for assignment.
June 16	Placed RHP Daniel Palencia on the 15-day IL. Recalled RHP Gavin Hollowell from Iowa.
June 17	Sent LHP Doug Nikhazy outright to Iowa.
June 18	Optioned DH Moisés Ballesteros to Iowa.
June 19	Recalled OF Justin Dean from Iowa.
June 20	Traded 1B Cameron Sisneros to Houston Astros for RHP Jayden Murray. Designated LHP Luis Peralta for assignment.
June 22	Signed free agent RHP Jhon Cabral and LHP Drew Pomeranz to minor league contracts.
June 23	Activated RHP Jayden Murray. Optioned RHP Gavin Hollowell to Iowa.
June 24	Placed RHP Ben Brown on the 15-day IL retroactive to June 21. Placed RHP Edward Cabrera on the 15-day IL. Recalled RHPs Gavin Hollowell and Tyler Ferguson from Iowa. Selected the contract of RHP Vince Velasquez from Iowa. Claimed RHP Bryse Wilson off waivers from Philadelphia Phillies. Designated RHPs Christian Roa and Eduarniel Núñez for assignment. Sent LHP Luis Peralta outright to Iowa.
June 25	Traded 3B Cole Mathis to New York Mets for LHP David Peterson. Activated LHP Matthew Boyd from the 15-day IL. Optioned RHPs Tyler Ferguson and Gavin Hollowell to Iowa. Designated RHP Yosver Sulueta for assignment.
June 26	Activated LHP David Peterson. Placed RHP Phil Maton on the 15-day IL.
June 27	Placed LHP Hoby Milner on 15-day iL retroactive to June 26. Recalled RHP Tyler Ferguson from Iowa. Optioned RHP Jayden Murray to Iowa.
June 28	Recalled LHP Jordan Wicks from Iowa. Designated Vince Velasquez for assignment.
June 29	Placed RHP Ethan Roberts on the 15-day IL. Placed OF Matt Shaw on the 10-day IL. Recalled OF Kevin Alcántara and RHP Gavin Hollowell from Iowa.
June 30	Sent RHP Vince Velasquez outright to Iowa.

==== July ====
July 1	Acquired IF Michael Hellquist from Milwaukee Milkmen of the American Association. Sent RHP Eduarniel Núñez out right to Iowa. RHP Christian Roa elected free agency.
July 2	Optioned LHP Jordan Wicks to Iowa. Signed free agent IF Luis Abreu and RHP Jacob Wallace to minor league contracts.
July 3	Selected the contract of Drew Pomeranz from Iowa.
July 4	Designated RHP Bryse Wilson for assignment. Signed free agent RHP Jake Woodford.
July 7	Sent RHP Bryse Wilson outright to Iowa.
July 8	Signed LHP Josh Fleming.
July 11	Activated RHP Phil Maton from the 15-day IL. Designated RHP Jake Woodford for assignment.
July 17	Signed RHPs Carson Jasa, Dylan Marionneaux, Cade Townsend, Luke Alwwod, and LHP Cole Tryba.
July 18	Traded RHP Aiden Moffett to Athletics for RHP Aaron Civale. Signed free agent RHP Jake Woodford to a minor league contract.
July 20	Activated RHP Aaron Civale. Designated LHP Drew Pomeranz for assignment. Placed RHP Phil Maton on the 15-day IL. Activated RHP Jameson Taillon from the 15-day IL.
July 21	Signed free agent OF Greg Jones.
July 23	Optioned OF Kevin Alcántara to Iowa. Sent LHP Drew Pomeranz outright to Iowa.
July 24	Recalled IF James Triantos from Iowa.
July 27	Designated RHP Jameson Taillon for assignment. Selected the contract of RHP Andrew Wantz from Iowa. Signed C Emanuel Hernandez and RHPs Ariston Veasey, Luke McGrath, and Luke Guth. Signed free agents OF Michael Gupton, C Jhoander Irigoyen, 1B Blake Bevis, C Colin Hynek to minor league contracts.
July 28	Signed free agent IF Corey Nunuez to a minor league contract.
July 29	Selected the contract of RHP Jake Woodford from Iowa. Designated RHP Andrew Wantz for assignment.
July 31	Recalled LHP Antoine Kelly from Iowa. Placed RHP Gavin Hollowell on the 15-day IL.

==== August ====
August 1	Sent RHP Andrew Wantz outright to Iowa.
August 2	Traded OF Brett Batemen and SS Ty Southisene to Toronto Blue Jays for RHP Kevin Gausman. Traded RHP Jaemson Taillon and cash to Toronto Blue Jays for planer to be named later.
August 3	Traded SS Jefferson Rojas to New York Mets for RHP Clay Holmes and OF Tyrone Taylor. Traded 3B Jonathon Long and RHP Jace Beck to Miami Marlins for LHP Braxton Garrett. Traded DH Moisés Ballesteros and RHP Mason McGwire to Los Angeles Angles for RHP Ryan Zeferjahn. Optioned OF Justin Dean to Iowa. Recalled OF Kevin Alcántara from Iowa. Placed RHP Clay Holmes on 60-day IL. Transferred RHP Ben Brown from the 15-day IL to the 60-day IL. Designated LHP Luke Little for assignment.
August 4	Activated OF Tyrone Taylor and RHP Ryan Zeferjahn. Optioned OF Kevin Alcántara to Iowa. Designated RHP Jake Woodford for assignment.
August 5	Activated RHP Kevin Gausman. Optioned LHP Antoine Kelly to Iowa.
August 6	Recalled LHP Braxton Garrett from Iowa. Optioned RHP Tyler Ferguson to Iowa. Signed free agent RHP Andrew Antz to a minor league contract.
August 7	Sent RHP Jake Woodford outright to Iowa.
August 8	Activated RHP Clay Holmes from the 60-day IL. Optioned LHP Braxton Garret to Iowa.
August 9	Optioned RHP Ethan Roberts to Iowa.
August 16	Optioned RHP Javier Assad to Iowa. Activated RHP Edward Cabrera from the 15-day IL.
August 17	Placed RHP Edward Cabrera on the 15-day IL. Placed IF Dansby Swanson on the 10-day IL. Transferred RHP Daniel Palencia to the 60-day IL. Recalled OF Kevin Alcántara and RHP Javier Assad from Iowa. Optioned IF James Triantos to Iowa. Selected the contract of IF Owen Miller from Iowa.
August 19	Claimed IF Gabriel Arias off waivers from New York Mets. Transferred RHP Phil Maton to the 60-day IL. Signed free agent IF Jackson Cluff to a minor league contract.
August 21	Optioned RHP Javier Assad to Iowa. Activated RHP Daniel Palencia from IL. Designated IF Owen Miller for assignment. Activated IF Gabrial Arias.
August 24	Sent IF Owen Miller outright to Iowa.
August 27	Optioned OF Kevin Alcántara to Iowa.
August 28	Activated OF Matt Shaw from the 10-day IL.
August 29	Designated LHP Hoby Milner for assignment.
August 30	Released LHP Hoby Milner.

==== September ====
September 1	Recalled RHP Tyer Ferguson from Iowa. Selected the contract of BJ Murray Jr. from Iowa.
September 5	Recalled RHP Javier Assad from Iowa. Optioned RHP Tyler Ferguson to Iowa.
September 12	Activated RHP Edward Cabrera from the 15-day IL. Placed RHP Trent Thornton on the 15-day IL.
September 18	Activated IF Dansby Swanson from the 10-day IL. Optioned IF BJ Murray Jr. to Iowa.
September 25	Activated RHP Gavin Hollowell from the 15-day IL.
September 26	Claimed RHP Julian Aguiar off waivers from Cincinnati Reds. Optioned RHP Julian Aguiar to ACL Cubs. Designated LHP Antoine Kelly for assignment.
September 27	Recalled LHP Braxton Garrett from Iowa. Optioned RHP Gavin Hollowell to ACL Cubs.

== Roster ==
2026 Chicago Cubs
Roster
Pitchers: 72 Javier Assad; 58 Charlie Barnes; 58 Ty Blach; 16 Matthew Boyd; 32 Ben Brown; 30 Edward Cabrera; 38 Aaron Civale; 64 Tyler Ferguson; 60 Braxton Garrett; 12 Kevin Gausman; 45 Hunter Harvey; 46 Gavin Hollowell; 25 Clay Holmes; 22 Cade Horton; 18 Shota Imanaga; 62 Antoine Kelly; 43 Luke Little; 38 Corbin Martin; 51 Riley Martin; 88 Phil Maton; 41 Hoby Milner; 70 Jayden Murray; 48 Daniel Palencia; 19 David Peterson; 47 Drew Pomeranz; 53 Colin Rea; 57 Yacksel Ríos; 39 Ethan Roberts; 33 Ryan Rolison; 50 Jameson Taillon; 24 Caleb Thielbar; 49 Trent Thornton; 56 Vince Velasquez; 61 Andrew Wantz; 71 Jacob Webb; 36 Jordan Wicks; 55 Bryse Wilson; 40 Jake Woodford; 56 Ryan Zeferjahn	Catchers: 25 Moisés Ballesteros; 9 Miguel Amaya; 15 Carson Kelly; Infielders: 43 Gabriel Arias; 25 Moisés Ballesteros; 3 Alex Bregman; 29 Michael Busch; 2 Nico Hoerner; 12 Scott Kingery; 5 Nicky Lopez; 66 Owen Miller; 83 BJ Murray Jr.; 75 Pedro Ramírez; 7 Dansby Swanson; 5 James Triantos	Outfielders: 13 Kevin Alcántara; 5 Dylan Carlson; 20 Michael Conforto; 4 Pete Crow-Armstrong; 1 Justin Dean; 8 Ian Happ; 6 Matt Shaw; 27 Seiya Suzuki; 55 Tyrone Taylor	Manager: 30 Craig Counsell; Coaches: 0 Quintin Berry (third base); 63 Juan Cabreja (assistant hitting); 93 Erick Castillo (bullpen catcher); 84 Ryan Flaherty (bench); 68 Tommy Hottovy (pitching); 86 Casey Jacobson (assistant pitching); 65 Jose Javier (first base); 76 Dustin Kelly (hitting); 74 AJ Lewis (staff assistant); 85 Garrett Lloyd (bullpen catcher); 80 John Mallee (assistant hitting); 90 Jonathan Mota (major league coach); 81 Mark Strittmatter (bullpen)

== Postseason ==
=== Game log ===
2026 Postseason Game Log: 0–2 (Home: 0–0; Away: 0–2)
2026 National League Wild Card Series: 0–2 (Home: 0–0; Away: 0–2)

#	Date	Opponent	Score	Win	Loss	Save	Attendance	Record
1	September 29	@ Padres	0–8	King (1–0)	**Boyd** (0–1)	–	47,048	0–1
2	September 30	@ Padres	1–4	Rodríguez (1–0)	**Gausman** (0–1)	Miller (1)	47,513	0–2

Legend: = Win = Loss = Postponement
Bold = Cubs team member

=== Wild Card series ===
==== Game 1 ====
September 29, 2026 9:00 pm (CDT) at Petco Park in San Diego, California 72 °F (22 °C), Clear
Team	1	2	3	4	5	6	7	8	9	R	H	E
Chicago	0	0	0	0	0	0	0	0	0	**0**	**3**	**1**
**San Diego**	2	0	1	1	3	0	1	0	X	**8**	**13**	**1**
WP: Michael King (1–0) LP: Matthew Boyd (0–1); Home runs: CHC: None; SD: Fernando Tatis Jr. (1), Manny Machado (1), Xander Bogaerts (1); Attendance: 47,048; Boxscore

The Padres announced Michael King would be their game one starter while Matthew Boyd was named the starter for the Cubs. Pete Crow-Armstrong and Alex Bregman struck out to start the game and Boyd allowed two home runs on his first four pitches as the Cubs fell behind quickly 2–0. Boyd allowed another run in the third and another home run in the fourth as the Padres were well on their way to blowing out the Cubs. The Cubs failed to get their first hit until the seventh while Javier Assad allowed two more runs in the fifth. The Cubs managed only three hits in the game and were blown out 8–0. The loss put the Cubs on the brink of elimination.

==== Game 2 ====
September 30, 2026 9:00 pm (CDT) at Petco Park in San Diego, California 71 °F (22 °C), Partly Cloudy
Team	1	2	3	4	5	6	7	8	9	R	H	E
Chicago	0	0	0	1	0	0	0	0	0	**1**	**5**	**0**
**San Diego**	0	2	0	2	0	0	0	0	X	**4**	**8**	**0**
WP: Bradgley Rodriguez (1–0) LP: Kevin Gausman (0–1) Sv: Mason Miller (1); Home runs: CHC: None; SD: Gavin Sheets (1); Attendance: 47,513; Boxscore

In game two, Kevin Gausman allowed three runs in 3.1 innings of work. Nico Hoerner drove in the Cubs only run of the series in the fourth and Daniel Palencia gave up a two-run homer in the fourth as the Cubs lost 4–1. As a result, the Cubs were swept in the series and eliminated from postseason play. In the series, Crow-Armstrong and Bregman combined to strike out eight times without getting a hit.

==== Composite line score ====
2026 NLWC (0–2): Chicago Cubs

Team	1	2	3	4	5	6	7	8	9	R	H	E
Chicago Cubs	0	0	0	1	0	0	0	0	0	**1**	**8**	**1**
**San Diego Padres**	2	2	1	3	3	0	1	0	0	**12**	**21**	**1**
Total attendance: 94,561 Average attendance: 47,281

=== Postseason rosters ===
Playoff rosters
National League Wild Card Series

- Pitchers: 12 Kevin Gausman 16 Matthew Boyd 18 Shota Imanaga 19 David Peterson 25 Clay Holmes 33 Ryan Rolison 38 Aaron Civale 48 Daniel Palencia 53 Colin Rea 56 Ryan Zeferjahn 71 Jacob Webb 72 Javier Assad
- Catchers: 9 Miguel Amaya 15 Carson Kelly
- Infielders: 2 Nico Hoerner 3 Alex Bregman 7 Dansby Swanson 29 Michael Busch 71 Gabriel Arias 75 Pedro Ramírez
- Outfielders: 4 Pete Crow-Armstrong 8 Ian Happ 20 Michael Conforto 27 Seiya Suzuki 55 Tyrone Taylor
- Infielders/Outfielders: 6 Matt Shaw

== Statistics ==
=== Regular season ===
==== Batting ====
Note: Team leaders in each category are noted in bold

Note: G = Games played; PA = Plate appearances; R = Runs; H = Hits; 2B = Doubles; 3B = Triples; HR = Home runs; RBI = Runs batted in; SB = Stolen bases; BB = Walks; K = Strikeouts; AVG = Batting average; OBP = On-base percentage; SLG = Slugging percentage; TB = Total bases

Player	G	PA	AB	R	H	2B	3B	HR	RBI	SB	BB	K	AVG	OBP	SLG	TB
Kevin Alcántara	24	28	25	6	6	0	0	1	6	0	2	11	.240	.286	.360	9
Miguel Amaya	83	254	215	36	51	12	0	6	28	0	23	67	.237	.340	.377	81
Gabriel Arias	7	10	8	1	3	0	0	0	3	0	1	2	.375	.400	.375	3
Moisés Ballesteros	59	175	156	16	36	6	0	6	23	1	17	36	.231	.303	.385	.60
Alex Bregman	155	702	608	92	161	**33**	2	28	93	3	76	102	.265	.355	.464	282
Michael Busch	160	710	600	78	145	27	2	20	77	3	**92**	165	.242	.352	.393	236
Dylan Carlson	3	4	4	1	0	0	0	0	0	0	0	2	.000	.000	.000	0
Michael Conforto	113	314	271	32	65	17	0	15	45	1	35	80	.240	.331	.469	127
Pete Crow-Armstrong	**162**	**726**	626	**119**	**175**	31	**8**	**45**	**107**	**41**	83	187	**.280**	**.372**	**.570**	**357**
Justin Dean	17	10	8	3	3	0	1	0	3	1	2	4	.375	.500	.625	5
Ian Happ	156	636	546	89	119	28	3	24	68	4	81	**189**	.218	.326	.412	225
Nico Hoerner	159	689	**628**	62	165	29	1	8	72	23	43	58	.263	.316	.350	220
Carson Kelly	120	425	380	57	98	15	0	10	58	0	40	70	.258	.336	376	143
Scott Kingery	8	4	4	2	1	0	0	0	0	1	0	0	.250	.250	.250	1
Nicky Lopez	4	5	5	1	0	0	0	0	0	0	0	2	.000	.000	.000	0
BJ Murray Jr.	7	11	11	0	1	0	0	0	0	0	0	4	.091	.091	.091	1
Pedro Ramírez	80	266	241	36	63	12	2	6	32	9	20	49	.261	.324	.402	97
Matt Shaw	77	202	173	25	41	9	3	5	24	4	21	35	.237	.327	.410	71
Seiya Suzuki	143	634	545	96	147	31	1	26	86	3	81	155	.270	.368	.473	258
Dansby Swanson	126	486	428	82	91	16	3	19	69	17	51	115	.213	.297	.397	170
Tyrone Taylor	30	82	74	14	26	8	0	1	10	3	5	10	.351	.390	.500	37
James Triantos	7	9	8	2	1	0	0	0	0	0	1	2	.125	.222	.125	1
**Team totals**	162	6382	5564	850	1398	274	26	220	804	114	674	1345	.251	.339	.430	2384

==== Pitching ====
Note: Team leaders in each category are noted in bold
Note: W = Wins; L = Losses; ERA = Earned run average G = Games pitched; GS = Games started; SV = Saves; IP = Innings pitched; H = Hits allowed; R = Runs allowed; ER = Earned runs allowed; BB = Walks allowed; K = Strikeouts

Player	W	L	ERA	G	GS	SV	IP	H	R	ER	BB	K
Javier Assad	6	2	3.63	28	11	2	94.1	81	39	38	27	63
Charlie Barnes	0	0	9.00	1	0	0	3.0	4	4	3	3	1
Ty Blach	0	0	0.00	1	0	0	3.0	1	0	0	0	2
Matthew Boyd	10	5	3.91	22	22	0	126.2	114	59	55	39	96
Ben Brown	4	2	1.85	20	8	1	68.0	45	16	14	19	65
Edward Cabrera	5	5	5.96	18	15	0	80.0	83	58	53	36	71
Aaron Civale	1	1	1.72	18	0	2	36.2	27	9	7	12	33
Tyler Ferguson	0	1	3.63	17	0	0	17.1	11	7	7	4	20
Braxton Garrett	1	0	1.80	1	0	0	5.0	1	1	1	3	2
Kevin Gausman	4	2	4.83	9	9	0	50.1	51	28	27	11	57
Hunter Harvey	0	1	6.75	4	0	0	4.0	5	3	3	1	4
Gavin Hollowell	0	0	2.45	15	0	1	14.2	11	5	4	9	13
Clay Holmes	2	4	4.25	9	9	0	48.2	39	25	23	24	33
Cade Horton	1	0	2.45	2	2	0	7.1	4	2	2	2	4
Shota Imanaga	**11**	**10**	**3.77**	32	**32**	0	**174.1**	**154**	**75**	**73**	37	**174**
Antoine Kelly	0	0	0.00	1	0	0	1.1	0	0	0	1	1
Carson Kelly	0	0	6.00	3	0	0	3.0	4	2	2	0	0
Luke Little	0	0	9.00	1	0	0	1.0	2	1	1	0	1
Corbin Martin	0	0	10.80	7	0	1	5.0	5	6	6	5	4
Riley Martin	0	0	2.16	8	1	0	8.1	5	2	2	2	10
Phil Maton	0	1	6.18	31	0	0	27.2	34	19	19	16	31
Hoby Milner	1	0	3.53	38	0	1	35.2	34	14	14	9	18
Jayden Murray	0	0	18.0	2	0	0	3.0	6	6	6	2	6
Daniel Palencia	2	2	3.64	32	0	3	29.2	25	13	12	11	30
David Peterson	6	2	3.70	16	15	0	80.1	75	35	33	35	74
Drew Pomeranz	2	0	7.94	6	0	0	5.2	7	5	5	4	1
Colin Rea	8	8	4.34	34	19	2	137.0	135	68	66	**47**	101
Yacksel Ríos	0	0	0.00	1	0	0	1.2	0	0	0	0	2
Ethan Roberts	0	2	4.21	23	0	0	25.2	22	14	12	14	17
Ryan Rolison	9	2	3.14	60	2	3	63.0	53	24	22	28	55
Jameson Taillon	2	6	5.92	15	15	0	76.0	76	51	50	27	68
Caleb Thielbar	3	4	4.86	58	0	3	50.0	47	30	27	18	60
Trent Thornton	5	5	3.35	48	0	3	48.1	41	21	18	17	31
Vince Velasquez	0	0	0.00	2	0	0	3.1	1	0	0	0	1
Andrew Wantz	0	0	4.50	1	0	0	2.0	3	1	1	1	0
Jacob Webb	6	5	3.36	**68**	0	**9**	67.0	59	28	25	25	73
Jordan Wicks	0	2	10.45	4	2	2	10.1	18	12	12	2	8
Bryse Wilson	0	0	8.22	2	0	0	7.2	12	7	7	1	8
Jake Woodford	0	0	9.00	2	0	0	3.0	6	3	3	0	3
Ryan Zeferjahn	0	1	4.50	20	0	3	18.0	19	10	9	8	19
**Team totals**	89	73	4.12	162	162	36	1447.0	1323	703	662	500	1260

=== Postseason ===
==== Batting ====
Note: G = Games played; AB = At bats; R = Runs; H = Hits; 2B = Doubles; 3B = Triples; HR = Home runs; RBI = Runs batted in; SB = Stolen bases; BB = Walks; K = Strikeouts; AVG = Batting average; OBP = On-base percentage; SLG = Slugging percentage; TB = Total bases

Player	G	PA	R	H	2B	3B	HR	RBI	SB	BB	K	AVG	OBP	SLG	TB
Alex Bregman	2	8	0	0	0	0	0	0	0	0	4	.000	.000	.000	0
Michael Busch	2	7	0	0	0	0	0	0	0	0	2	.000	.000	.000	0
Michael Conforto	2	0	0	0	0	0	0	0	0	0	2	.000	.000	.000	0
Pete Crow-Armstrong	2	8	0	0	0	0	0	0	1	1	4	.000	.125	.000	0
Ian Happ	2	8	0	0	0	0	0	0	0	2	1	.000	.250	.000	0
Nico Hoerner	2	8	0	4	1	0	0	1	0	0	0	.500	.500	.625	5
Carson Kelly	2	7	0	1	0	0	0	0	0	0	1	.167	.286	.167	1
Pedro Ramírez	2	4	0	0	0	0	0	0	0	0	1	.000	.000	.000	0
Matt Shaw	1	3	0	0	0	0	0	0	0	1	1	.000	.333	.000	0
Seiya Suzuki	2	8	1	2	0	0	0	0	0	1	2	.286	.375	.286	2
Dansby Swanson	2	6	0	0	0	0	0	0	0	0	2	.000	.000	.000	0
Tyrone Taylor	1	1	0	1	0	0	0	0	0	0	0	1.000	1.000	1.000	1
**Team totals**	2	70	1	8	1	0	0	1	1	7	19	.129	.229	.145	9

==== Pitching ====
Note: W = Wins; L = Losses; ERA = Earned run average G = Games pitched; GS = Games started; SV = Saves; IP = Innings pitched; H = Hits allowed; R = Runs allowed; ER = Earned runs allowed; BB = Walks allowed; K = Strikeouts

Player	W	L	ERA	G	GS	SV	IP	H	R	ER	BB	K
Javier Assad	0	0	27.00	1	0	0	0.2	2	3	2	1	1
Matthew Boyd	0	1	9.00	1	1	0	4.1	5	4	4	1	4
Aaron Civale	0	0	9.00	1	0	0	1.0	3	1	1	0	0
Kevin Gausman	0	1	8.10	1	1	0	3.1	5	3	3	0	1
Daniel Palencia	0	0	5.40	1	0	0	1.2	1	1	1	0	2
David Peterson	0	0	0.00	1	0	0	1.2	0	0	0	0	1
Ryan Rolison	0	0	0.00	1	0	0	1.0	1	0	0	0	2
Jacob Webb	0	0	0.00	1	0	0	1.1	2	0	0	0	0
Ryan Zeferjahn	0	0	0.00	1	0	0	1.1	1	0	0	1	2
**Team totals**	0	2	6.19	9	2	0	16.0	21	12	11	3	13

== Farm system ==
On February 18, the team announced the minor league coaching staffs for their farm system.

Level	Team	League	Manager	Location	Ballpark
AAA	Iowa Cubs	International League	Marty Pevey	Des Moines, Iowa	Principal Park
AA	Knoxville Smokies	Southern League	Lance Rymel	Knoxville, Tennessee	Covenant Health Park
High-A	South Bend Cubs	Midwest League	Daniel Wasinger	South Bend, Indiana	Four Winds Field at Coveleski Stadium
Single-A	Myrtle Beach Pelicans	Carolina League	Yovanny Cuevas	Myrtle Beach, South Carolina	TicketReturn.com Field
Rookie	ACL Cubs	Arizona Complex League	Dixon Machado	Mesa, Arizona	Sloan Park
Rookie	DSL Cubs	Dominican Summer League	Enrique Wilson; Carlos Ramirez	Boca Chica, Dominican Republic	Baseball City Complex
