= Mark Mathias =

American baseball player (born 1994)

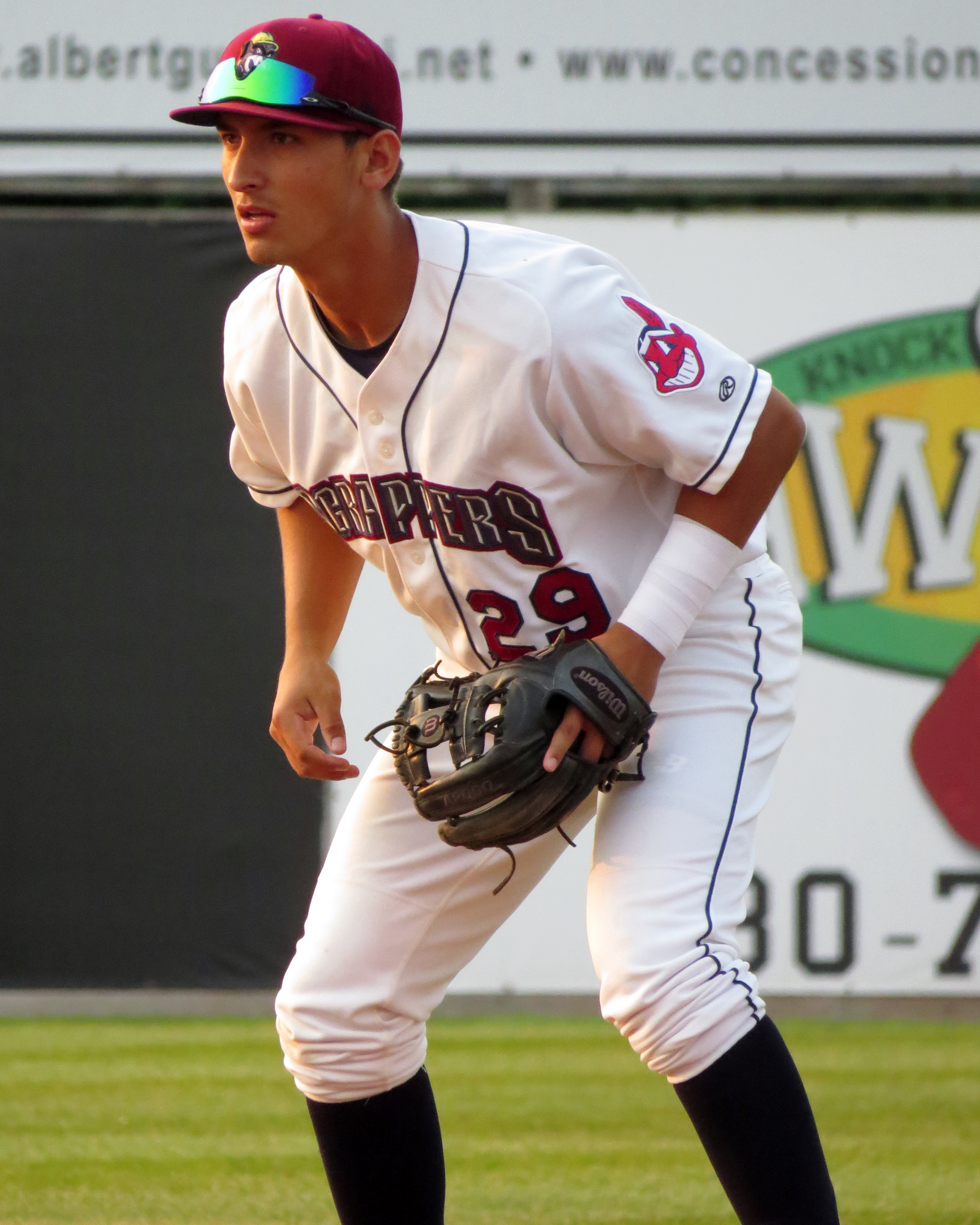
- Mathias with the Mahoning Valley Scrappers in 2015

Free agent
- Second baseman / Outfielder
- Born: August 2, 1994 (age 32); Santa Clara, California, U.S.
- Bats: Right Throws: Right

MLB debut
- August 4, 2020, for the Milwaukee Brewers

MLB statistics (through 2023 season)
- Batting average: .246
- Home runs: 6
- Runs batted in: 30
- Stats at Baseball Reference

Teams
- Milwaukee Brewers (2020, 2022); Texas Rangers (2022); Pittsburgh Pirates (2023); San Francisco Giants (2023)

Mark Andrew Mathias (born August 2, 1994) is an American professional baseball second baseman who is a free agent. He has previously played in Major League Baseball (MLB) for the Milwaukee Brewers, Texas Rangers, Pittsburgh Pirates, and San Francisco Giants. Mathias played college baseball at California Polytechnic State University, San Luis Obispo, and was selected by the Cleveland Indians in the third round of the 2015 Major League Baseball draft. He made his MLB debut in 2020.

== High school and college ==
Mathias attended Irvington High School in Fremont, California. He played shortstop and pitched, and was MVP and first-team All-Mission Valley League in his junior year.

Undrafted out of high school, Mathias attended California Polytechnic State University, San Luis Obispo, where he played college baseball for the Cal Poly Mustangs. Mathias also played for the 2014 USA Collegiate National Team. He underwent arthroscopic shoulder surgery in December 2014. In his college career he batted 356/.426/.447 in 452 at bats with 95 runs and 21 stolen bases.

== Professional career ==
=== Cleveland Indians ===
The Cleveland Indians selected Mathias in the third round of the 2015 Major League Baseball draft. Mathias played for the Mahoning Valley Scrappers in 2015, hitting .282/.382/.408 with two home runs and 32 runs batted in (RBIs). He split the 2016 season between the Lynchburg Hillcats and the Akron RubberDucks, hitting a combined .267/.351/.396 with five home runs and 61 RBIs. In the Carolina League, he was 8th in runs (70), 3rd in doubles (39), and 7th in hit by pitch (10). He was named a Carolina League post-season All Star, and an MiLB organization All Star.

Mathias spent the 2017 and 2018 seasons in Akron, hitting .212 in 35 games in 2017, and .232 with eight home runs and 45 RBIs in 2018. He was named an MiLB organization 2018 All Star. He spent the 2019 season with the Columbus Clippers, hitting .269/.355/.442 with 12 home runs and 59 RBIs.

=== Milwaukee Brewers ===
Cleveland traded Mathias to the Milwaukee Brewers in exchange for Andres Melendez on November 20, 2019, and the Brewers added him to their 40-man roster.

Mathias made his MLB debut on August 4, 2020, as a pinch runner. In 2020 with the Brewers he batted .278/.278/.361 in 36 at bats, playing primarily right field.

On March 16, 2021, Mathias was placed on the 60-day injured list due to a torn labrum in his shoulder, and remained there through the end of the season. On November 19, 2021, Mathias was outrighted off of the 40-man roster and sent to the Triple-A Nashville Sounds.

On May 24, 2022, the Brewers selected Mathias' contract from Triple-A Nashville. In 2022 with Nashville, he batted .318/.421/.518 in 170 at bats. On June 11, Mathias hit his first major league home run, a two-run shot off of Patrick Corbin of the Washington Nationals. For the season with the Brewers, he batted 2–16, playing six games at second base.

=== Texas Rangers ===
On August 1, 2022, Mathias and pitcher Antoine Kelly were traded to the Texas Rangers in exchange for pitcher Matt Bush. With Round Rock he batted .345/.429/.517 in 29 at bats, playing primarily second base. Mathias played in 24 games with Texas in 2022, hitting .277/.365/.554 in 65 at bats with 5 home runs and 16 RBIs. On March 4, 2023, Mathias was designated for assignment by the Rangers after the signing of Will Smith was made official.

=== Pittsburgh Pirates ===
On March 8, 2023, Mathias was traded to the Pittsburgh Pirates in exchange for Ricky DeVito. Mathias was optioned to the Triple-A Indianapolis Indians to begin the 2023 season, and with them he batted .273/.393/.384 in 99 at bats, playing primarily right field and second base. In 22 games for Pittsburgh, Mathias batted .231/.355/.269 in 52 at bats with no home runs, 4 RBIs, and 3 stolen bases without being caught. He played 15 games at second base, and two games in right field. On June 25, he was designated for assignment by the Pirates.

=== Seattle Mariners ===
On July 2, 2023, Mathias was claimed off waivers by the Seattle Mariners. With the Triple–A Tacoma Rainiers, he batted .345/.427/.500 in 58 at bats, playing primarily second base.

=== San Francisco Giants ===
On July 31, 2023, Mathias and A. J. Pollock were traded to the San Francisco Giants in exchange for cash considerations or a player to be named later. After 5 games with San Francisco, Mathias was placed on the injured list with a right shoulder strain on August 18. He was transferred to the 60–day injured list on August 22, ending his season. Following the season on November 1, Mathias was removed from the 40–man roster and sent outright to the Triple–A Sacramento River Cats. However, Mathias rejected the assignment and elected free agency on November 3.

=== Cincinnati Reds ===
On November 29, 2023, Mathias signed a minor league contract with the Cincinnati Reds. However, he did not appear in a game for the organization and elected free agency following the season on November 4, 2024.

=== Long Island Ducks ===
On April 4, 2025, Mathias signed with the Long Island Ducks of the Atlantic League of Professional Baseball. In 2 games he went 1 for 6 (.167). He became a free agent following the season.

== Personal life ==
Mathias identifies as Chinese American.
