= Pedro Ramírez (baseball) =

Venezuelan baseball player (born 2004)

Chicago Cubs – No. 75
- Infielder
- Born: April 1, 2004 (age 22); Temblador, Venezuela
- Bats: Switch Throws: Right

MLB debut
- May 23, 2026, for the Chicago Cubs

MLB statistics (through 2026 season)
- Batting average: .261
- Home runs: 6
- Runs batted in: 32
- Stats at Baseball Reference

Teams
- Chicago Cubs (2026–present)

Pedro Javier Ramírez (born April 1, 2004) is a Venezuelan professional baseball infielder for the Chicago Cubs of Major League Baseball (MLB). He made his MLB debut in 2026.

== Career ==
On January 15, 2021, Ramírez signed with the Chicago Cubs as an international free agent.

In 2025, Ramírez made 129 appearances for the Double-A Knoxville Smokies, batting .280/.346/.386 with eight home runs, 73 RBI, and 28 stolen bases. On November 18, 2025, the Cubs added Ramírez to their 40-man roster to protect him from the Rule 5 draft.

Ramírez was optioned to Double-A Knoxville to begin the 2026 season. He was later assigned to the Triple-A Iowa Cubs, where he slashed .312/.395/.547 with nine home runs, 40 RBI, and 19 stolen bases across 43 appearances. On May 22, 2026, Ramírez was promoted to the major leagues for the first time. On June 13, Ramírez hit his first career home run off of Reiver Sanmartín of the San Francisco Giants.
