= Gabriel Arias =

Gabriel Arias may refer to:

- Gabriel Arias (footballer) (born 1987), Chilean soccer player
- Gabriel Arias (pitcher) (born 1989), Dominican Republic baseball pitcher
- Gabriel Arias (shortstop) (born 2000), Venezuelan baseball shortstop
