= Riley Martin (baseball) =

American baseball player (born 1998)

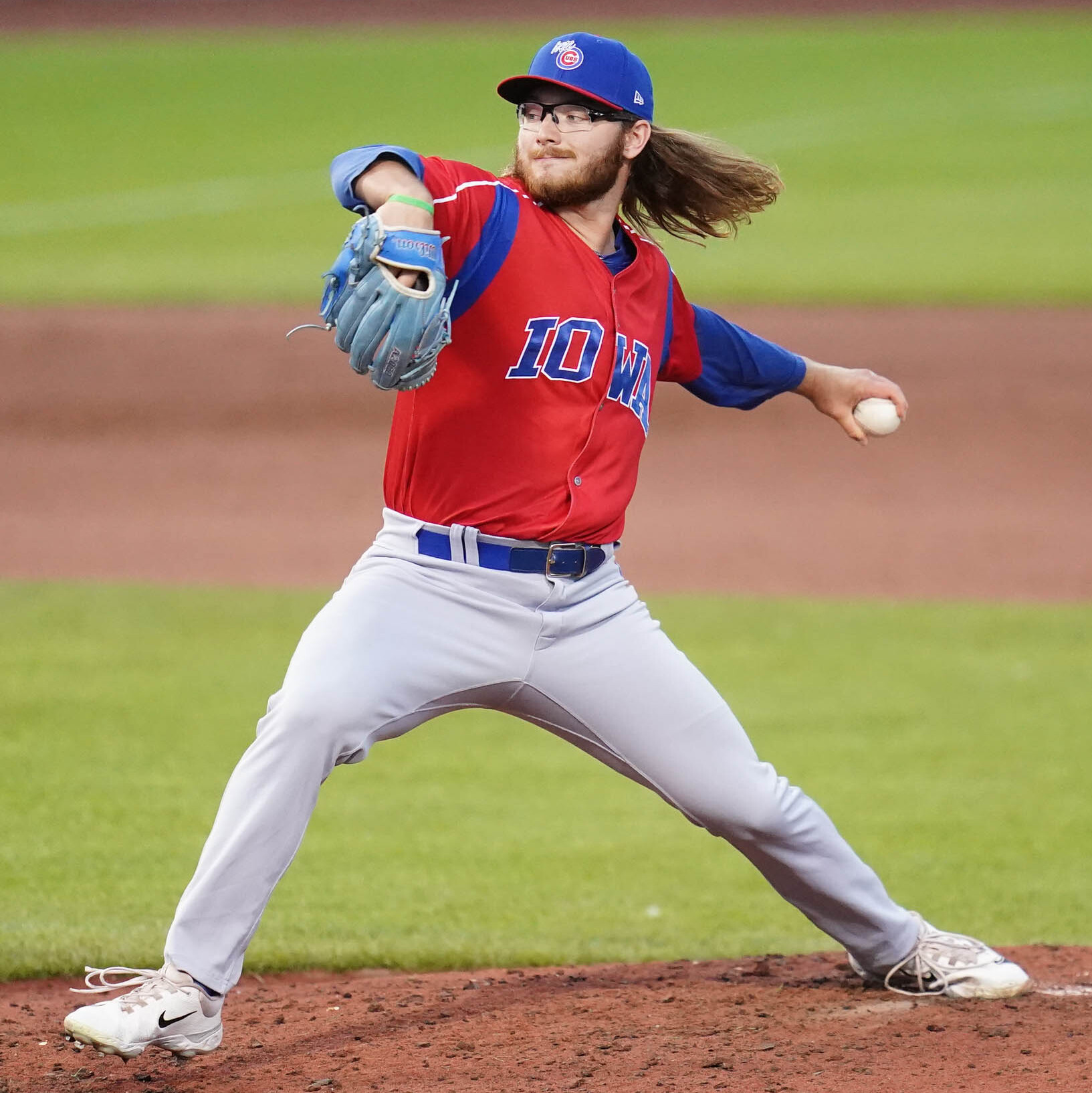
- Martin with the Iowa Cubs in 2023

Chicago Cubs – No. 51
- Pitcher
- Born: March 19, 1998 (age 28); Salem, Illinois, U.S.
- Bats: Left Throws: Left

MLB debut
- April 6, 2026, for the Chicago Cubs

MLB statistics (through 2026 season)
- Win–loss record: 0–0
- Earned run average: 2.16
- Strikeouts: 10
- Stats at Baseball Reference

Teams
- Chicago Cubs (2026–present)

Riley Cole Martin (born March 19, 1998) is an American professional baseball pitcher for the Chicago Cubs of Major League Baseball (MLB). He made his MLB debut in 2026.

== Career ==
Martin played college baseball at Quincy University. In his final season with the Hawks he went 9–3 with a 3.55 ERA and struck out 152 batters over 78 2/3 innings pitched.

Martin was selected in the sixth round of the 2021 MLB draft by the Chicago Cubs. He was assigned to the Myrtle Beach Pelicans of the Low-A East after signing with the team. Martin returned Myrtle Beach at the start of the 2022 season before being promoted to the South Bend Cubs of the High-A Midwest League. He split the 2023 season between the Double-A Tennessee Smokies and the Triple-A Iowa Cubs. Martin spent the entire 2024 season with the Iowa Cubs, appearing in 43 games and going 4–4 with a 4.48 ERA.

Martin made 47 appearances for Triple-A Iowa in 2025, posting a 6–2 record and 2.69 ERA with 80 strikeouts and four saves across 63 2/3 innings pitched. On November 18, 2025, the Cubs added Martin to their 40-man roster to protect him from the Rule 5 draft.

Martin was optioned to Triple-A Iowa to begin the 2026 season. The Cubs promoted Martin up to the major leagues for the first time on April 5, 2026. On April 28, Martin was ruled out for at least eight weeks due to left elbow inflammation.
