= Antoine Kelly =

American baseball player (born 1999)

Cleveland Guardians
- Pitcher
- Born: December 5, 1999 (age 26); Chicago, Illinois, U.S.
- Bats: Left Throws: Left

MLB debut
- July 31, 2026, for the Chicago Cubs

MLB statistics (through 2026 season)
- Win–loss record: 0–0
- Earned run average: 0.00
- Strikeouts: 1
- Stats at Baseball Reference

Teams
- Chicago Cubs (2026)

Antoine Jermaine Kelly (born December 5, 1999) is an American professional baseball pitcher in the Cleveland Guardians organization. He has previously played in Major League Baseball (MLB) for the Chicago Cubs.

== Career ==
Kelly attended Maine East High School in Park Ridge, Illinois. The San Diego Padres selected Kelly in the 13th round (381 overall) in the 2018 Major League Baseball draft. Kelly elected to attend Wabash Valley College instead. In his lone season at Wabash Valley, Kelly started 13 games posting a 9–0 win–loss record with a 1.88 earned run average (ERA) and 112 strikeouts.

=== Milwaukee Brewers ===
The Milwaukee Brewers selected Kelly in the second round, 65th overall, in the 2019 Major League Baseball draft. Kelly signed with the Brewers and Kelly posted a 2.84 ERA over 31 2/3 innings with the Arizona League Brewers Blue and the Wisconsin Timber Rattlers in 2019. Kelly did not play in 2020 due to the cancellation of the Minor League Baseball season because of the COVID-19 pandemic. In November 2020, Kelly underwent thoracic outlet syndrome surgery. Upon completing rehab Kelly split the 2021 season between the AZL Brewers, Wisconsin, and the Carolina Mudcats, going a combined 0–2 with a 9.78 ERA over 19 1/3 innings. He opened the 2022 season with Wisconsin, going 2–4 with a 3.86 ERA and 119 strikeouts over 91 innings. Kelly represented the Brewers at the 2022 All-Star Futures Game.

=== Texas Rangers ===
On August 1, 2022, the Brewers traded Kelly and Mark Mathias to the Texas Rangers in exchange for Matt Bush. Kelly finished the season with the Frisco RoughRiders of the Double-A Texas League, posting a 7.23 ERA with 24 strikeouts over 18 2/3 innings. Kelly received a non-roster invitation to major league spring training in 2023. Kelly split the 2023 season between Frisco and the Round Rock Express of the Triple-A Pacific Coast League, going a combined 3–1 with a 2.04 ERA and 79 strikeouts over 57 1/3 innings. Kelly was named the Texas Rangers 2023 Reliever of the Year. On November 14, 2023, the Rangers added Kelly to their 40-man roster to protect him from the Rule 5 draft.

Kelly was optioned to Triple–A Round Rock to begin the 2024 season. In 18 appearances, he struggled to a 9.37 ERA with 22 strikeouts across 16 1/3 innings of work. Kelly was designated for assignment by the Rangers on July 8, 2024.

=== Colorado Rockies ===
On July 15, 2024, Kelly was claimed off waivers by the Colorado Rockies. He was removed from the 40–man roster and sent outright to the Triple–A Albuquerque Isotopes on August 29. Kelly made nine appearances for Triple-A Albuquerque, but struggled to a 9.35 ERA with 10 strikeouts across 8 2/3 innings pitched. Kelly made 34 relief appearances for Albuquerque in 2025, registering a 3-5 record and 5.63 ERA with 41 strikeouts and four saves across 38 1/3 innings pitched. He elected free agency following the season on November 6, 2025.

=== Los Angeles Dodgers ===
On November 14, 2025, Kelly signed a minor league contract with the Los Angeles Dodgers. Kelly was assigned to the Triple-A Oklahoma City Comets to begin the regular season, for whom he logged an 0-3 record and 5.14 ERA with 22 strikeouts in 21 innings pitched across 23 appearances.

=== Chicago Cubs ===
On June 6, 2026, the Dodgers traded Kelly to the Chicago Cubs in exchange for cash considerations and he was added to their 40-man roster. In 13 appearances for the Triple-A Iowa Cubs, he logged a 1–1 record and 2.79 ERA with 22 strikeouts across 19 1/3 innings pitched. On July 31, Kelly was promoted to the major leagues for the first time. He made his debut the same day against the New York Yankees, and pitched 1 1/3 scoreless inning. Kelly also recorded his first career strikeout against Ben Rice. Kelly was designated for assignment by the Cubs on September 26, and was sent outright to Triple–A Iowa after clearing waivers three days later. He elected free agency on September 30.

=== Cleveland Guardians ===
On November 9, 2026, Kelly signed a minor league contract with the Cleveland Guardians.
