= BJ Murray Jr. =

Bahamian baseball player (born 2000)

BJ Murray

Chicago Cubs – No. 83
- Third baseman
- Born: January 5, 2000 (age 26); Nassau, Bahamas
- Bats: Switch Throws: Right

MLB debut
- September 1, 2026, for the Chicago Cubs

MLB statistics (through 2026 season)
- Batting average: .091
- Home runs: 0
- Runs batted in: 0
- Stats at Baseball Reference

Teams
- Chicago Cubs (2026–present)

Bertram Gerard Alfonzo Murray Jr. (born January 5, 2000) is a Bahamian professional baseball third baseman for the Chicago Cubs of Major League Baseball (MLB). He debuted in MLB in 2026.

== Amateur career ==
Murray attended Florida Atlantic University, where he played college baseball for the Florida Atlantic Owls. He batted .203 in 15 games during his sophomore season before it was cut short due to the coronavirus pandemic. Murray was named second team All-Conference USA as a junior after batting .317 with 14 home runs and 52 runs batted in (RBIs).

== Professional career ==
The Chicago Cubs selected Murray in the 15th round of the 2021 Major League Baseball draft. After signing with the team he was assigned to the Low-A Myrtle Beach Pelicans, where he hit .305 over 39 games before being promoted to the South Bend Cubs of the High-A Midwest League. Murray played the 2023 season with the Double-A Tennessee Smokies. He was selected to play in the 2023 All-Star Futures Game. In 2024, he played with the Smokies and Triple-A Iowa Cubs, and in 2025, he played the entire season with the Smokies. Murray played the 2026 season with Iowa and batted .294 with 16 home runs and 68 RBIs across 118 games.

On September 1, 2026, the Cubs promoted Murray to the major leagues.
