= James Triantos =

American baseball player (born 2003)

Chicago Cubs – No. 5
- Second baseman / Outfielder
- Born: January 29, 2003 (age 23); Fairfax, Virginia, U.S.
- Bats: Right Throws: Right

MLB debut
- July 25, 2026, for the Chicago Cubs

MLB statistics (through 2026 season)
- Batting average: .125
- Home runs: 0
- Runs batted in: 0

Teams
- Chicago Cubs (2026–present)

James Douglas Triantos (born January 29, 2003) is an American professional baseball second baseman and outfielder for the Chicago Cubs of Major League Baseball (MLB).

== Amateur career ==
Triantos attended and played high school baseball at James Madison High School in Vienna, Virginia. During his senior year, he hit .712 while striking out only twice and also pitched to a 1.18 ERA, leading his team to a Class 6A State Championship. Triantos reclassified from the 2022 draft class to the 2021 class.

== Professional career ==
Triantos was selected in the second round of the 2021 Major League Baseball draft by the Chicago Cubs. He signed for $2.1 million, forgoing his commitment to play college baseball at the University of North Carolina. He saw limited action with the rookie-level Arizona Complex League Cubs during his first professional season, and posted a .327/.376/.594 slash line in 25 games.

In 2025, Triantos made 110 appearances for the High-A South Bend Cubs and Triple-A Iowa Cubs, batting .259/.315/.370 with seven home runs, 47 RBI, and 31 stolen bases. On November 18, 2025, the Cubs added Triantos to their 40-man roster to protect him from the Rule 5 draft.

Triantos was optioned to Triple-A Iowa to begin the 2026 season.
