= 2023 Chicago Cubs season =

2023 Chicago Cubs
- League: National League
- Division: Central
- Ballpark: Wrigley Field
- City: Chicago
- Record: 83–79 (.512)
- Divisional place: 2nd
- Owners: Tom Ricketts
- President of baseball operations: Jed Hoyer
- General managers: Carter Hawkins
- Managers: David Ross
- Television: Marquee Sports Network
- Radio: WSCR; Chicago Cubs Radio Network

The 2023 Chicago Cubs season was the 152nd season of the Chicago Cubs franchise, the 148th in the National League, and the Cubs' 108th season at Wrigley Field. The Cubs were led by fourth-year manager David Ross and played as members of Major League Baseball's National League Central. The Cubs began the season March 30 at home against the Milwaukee Brewers and also finished the season against the Brewers in Milwaukee on October 1. With a win over the Rockies on September 24, the Cubs clinched a winning season, the team's first since 2020. The Cubs finished the season 83–79 to finish in second place in the Central, nine games behind the Brewers. They finished one game out of the final wild card spot, despite being in playoff position through most of August and September. As a result, they failed to make the postseason for the third consecutive season.

Pursuant to the collective bargaining agreement entered into by the owners in players ending 2022 lockout, the Cubs played every team in baseball at least one series and intra-division games were reduced from 18 or 19 games to 13 games against each division opponent.

The Chicago Cubs drew an average home attendance of 34,261 in 81 home games in the 2023 MLB season.

== Previous season ==
The Cubs finished the 2022 season 74–88 in third place in the Central division, 19 games out of first place. They missed the playoffs for the second consecutive season.

== Offseason ==
=== Coaching changes ===
On October 28, 2022, the team announced that hitting coach Greg Brown would not return. Cubs' minor league hitting coordinator, Dustin Kelly, was named the new hitting coach.

=== Rule changes ===
Pursuant to the CBA, new rule changes were in place for the 2023 season:

- institution of a pitch clock between pitches;
- limits on pickoff attempts per plate appearance;
- limits on defensive shifts requiring two infielders to be on either side of second and be within the boundary of the infield; and
- larger bases (increased to 18-inch squares).

=== Transactions ===
==== October 2022 ====
October 6	Activated LHPs Steven Brault and Justin Steele from the 15-day injured list (IL). Activated IF Nick Madrigal from the 10-day IL. Recalled RHPs Jeremiah Estrada, Anderson Espinoza, Caleb Killian, OFs Alexander Canario and Narcisso Crook, and IF Jared Young from Iowa Cubs. Activated C Miguel Amaya, LHP Brailyn Marquez, and RHP Alexander Vizcaino from Tennessee Smokies.

==== November 2022 ====
November 6	C Willson Contreras and LHP Wade Miley elected free agency.
November 9	LHP Drew Smyly elected free agency.
November 10	Activated RHP Kyle Hendricks, RHP Codi Heuer, OF Jason Heyward, OF Rafael Ortega, RHP Ethan Roberts from the 60-day IL. Sent IF David Bote, LHP Steven Brault, OF Narciso Crook, RHP Anderson Espinoza, RHP Alec Mills, DH Franmil Reyes, and LHP Brad Wieck outright to Iowa.
November 11	Sent IFs Esteban Quiroz and Jared Young outright to Iowa.
November 14	Released OF Jason Heyward.
November 15	Traded RHP Alfredo Zarraga to Tampa Bay Rays for IF Miles Mastrobuoni. Selected the contract of OF Brennen Davis and RHP Ryan Jensen from Iowa. Selected the contract of RHP Ben Brown from Tennessee. Selected the contract of OF Kevin Alcantara from Myrtle Beach Pelicans.
November 18	Claimed IF Rylan Bannon off of waivers from Atlanta Braves. LHP Brailyn Marquez, OF Rafael Ortega, and RHP Alexander Vizcaino elected free agency.

==== December 2022 ====
December 1	Signed free agent RHP Adrian Santana to a minor league contract.
December 5	Signed free agent LHP Brailyn Marquez to a minor league contract.
December 12	Signed free agent OF Be DeLuzio to a minor league contract
December 13	Signed free agent RHP Ronny Lopez and LHP Eric Stout to minor league contracts.
December 14	Signed free agent OF Cody Bellinger.
December 15	Signed free agent RHP Brad Boxberger.
December 19	Signed free agent RHP Jameson Taillon. Signed free agent IF Sergio Alcántara to a minor league contract.
December 21	Signed free agent IF Dansby Swanson.
December 23	Claimed LHP Anthony Kay off waivers from Toronto Blue Jays. Designated IF Alfonso Rivas for assignment.
December 24	Signed free agent LHP Drew Smyly. Designated RHP Erich Uelmen for assignment.
December 27	Signed free agent LHP Brad Wieck to a minor league contract.
December 29	Designated C P. J. Higgins for assignment. Signed free agent C Tucker Barnhart.

==== January 2023 ====
January 2	Signed free agent C Dom Núñez to a minor league contract.
January 3	Activated RHP Rowan Wick.
January 4	Traded RHP Erich Uelmen to Philadelphia Phillies for cash.
January 5	Released IF Alfonso Rivas.
January 6	Sent C P. J. Higgins outright to Iowa.
January 7	Signed free agent OF Mike Tauchman to a minor league contract.
January 13	Signed free agent IF Eric Hosmer. Designated RHP Mark Leiter Jr. for assignment.
January 15	Signed free agents C Daniel Campos, RHP Eduardo Castillo, IF Angel Cepeda, LHP Miguel Cruz, IF Ludwing Espinoza, IF Omar Ferrera, RHP Jostin Florentino, IF Albert Gonzalez, RHP Emannoel Madeira, IF Brailin Pascual, LHP Santiago Payares, IF Derniche Valdez, and IF Grenyerbert Velásquez to minor league contracts.
January 17	Claimed RHP Julian Merryweather off waivers from Toronto Blue Jays. Designed RHP Manuel Rodríguez for assignment.
January 19	Sent RHP Mark Leiter Jr. outright to Iowa.
January 20	Signed free agent OF Trey Mancini. Designated LHP Anthony Kay for assignment. Signed free agent C Luis Torrens to a minor league contract.
January 24	Sent RHPs Anthony Kay and Manuel Rodriguez outright to Iowa.
January 30	Signed frees agent RHPs Tyler Dudley, Jordan Holloway, and Mark Leiter Jr. to minor league contracts.

==== February 2023 ====
February 6	Invited non-roster RHP Nick Burdi, RHP Danis Correa, OF Pete Crow-Armstrong, OF Darius Hill. LHP Bailey Horn, RHP Ben Leeper, LHP Brenden Little, 1B Matt Mervis, IF Yonathan Perlaza, RHP Cam Sanders, IF Chase Strumpf, IF Andy Weber, and IF Bryce Windham to spring training.
February 17	Placed RHP Ethan Roberts on 60-day injured list. Signed free agent IF Edwin Ríos.
February 20	Placed RHP Codi Heuer on 60-day IL. Signed free agent RHP Michael Fulmer.
February 25	Assigned C Caleb Knight, RHP Peyton Remy, RHP Samuel Reyes, and RHP Black Whitney to Chicago Cubs.
February 26	Assigned RHP Max Bain, RHP Hunter Bigge, OF Zach Davis, RHP Kyle Johnson, IF Levi Jordan, RHP Nick Neidert, OF Cole Roederer, RHP Curtis Taylor, RHP Cayne Ueckert, C Jake Washer to Chicago Cubs.
February 27	Assigned C Pablo Aliendo, IF Bryce Ball, OF Bradlee Beesley, RHP Brad Deppermann, OF Jefferson Encarnacion, IF Reivaj Garcia, C Ethan Hearn, OF Ismael Mena, IF Scott McKeon, IF BJ Murray Jr., OF Jordan Nwogu, C Casey Optiz, IF Fabian Pertuz, OF Yohendrick Pinango, IF Jake Slaughter, LHP Dalton Stambaugh, LHP Didier Vargas, IF Luis Vazquez, and RHP Jarod Wright to Chicago Cubs.
February 28	Assigned RHP Joe Nahas, IF Miguel Pabon, RHP Jake Reindl, and IF James Triantos to Chicago Cubs.

==== March 2023 ====
March 1	Assigned RHP Michael McAvene to Chicago Cubs.
March 8	Assigned IF Christian Donahue to Chicago Cubs. Signed free agent LHP Christian Winston to a minor league contract.
March 10	Optioned OF Brennen Davis to Iowa. Optioned C Miguel Amaya, RHP Ben Brown, OF Alexander Canario, and RHP Ryan Jensen to Tennessee. Optioned CF Kevin Alcantara to South Bend Cubs.
March 11	Assigned C Moises Ballesteros to Chicago Cubs.
March 11	Assigned C Malcom Quintero to Chicago Cubs.
March 15	Assigned IF Luis Verdugo to Chicago Cubs.
March 16	Assigned OF Parker Chavers, OF Christian Franklin, and OF Jacob Wetzel to Chicago Cubs.
March 17	Assigned OF D.J. Artis, C Brayan Altuve, OF Raino Coran, OF Andy Garriola, IF Josue Huma, and IF Juan Mora to Chicago Cubs.
March 18	Optioned RHPs Jeremiah Estrada and Caleb Killian to Iowa. Assigned IF Christian Olivo to Chicago Cubs.
March 23	Traded IF Esteban Quiroz to Philadelphia Phillies for cash. Optioned OF Nelson Velásquez to Iowa. Assigned LHP Riley Martin, LHP Adam Laskey, and IF Liam Spence to Chicago Cubs.
March 24	Assigned RHPs Saul Gonzalez and Ben Hecht to Chicago Cubs.
March 25	Optioned RHP Adrian Sampson to Iowa. Assigned OF Felix Stevens and IF Yelson Santana to Chicago Cubs.
March 26	RHP Chris Clarke returned to Chicago Cubs from Seattle Mariners.
March 27	Traded IF Zach McKinstry to Detroit Tigers for RHP Carlos Guzman. Optioned IF Christopher Morel to Iowa. Sent RHP Rowan Wick outright to Iowa.
March 28	Selected the contract of C Luis Torrens from Iowa. Signed free agent LHP Jake Aldrich to a minor league contract.

== Regular season ==
=== Game log ===
Legend
	Cubs win
	Cubs loss
	Postponement
	Eliminated from playoff race
**Bold**	Cubs team member

2023 game log: 83–79 (Home: 45–36; Road: 38–43)
March/April: 14–13 (Home: 8–8; Road: 6–5)

#	Date	Opponent	Score	Win	Loss	Save	Attendance	Record	Streak/ Box
1	March 30	Brewers	4–0	**Stroman** (1–0)	Burnes (0–1)	—	36,054	1–0	W1
2	April 1	Brewers	1–3	Strzelecki (1–0)	**Assad** (0–1)	Williams (1)	31,363	1–1	L1
3	April 2	Brewers	5–9	Lauer (1–0)	**Taillon** (0–1)	—	33,266	1–2	L2
4	April 3	@ Reds	6–7	Cruz (1–0)	**Smyly** (0–1)	Law (1)	11,941	1–3	L3
5	April 4	@ Reds	12–5	**Alzolay** (1–0)	Farmer (0–2)	—	13,399	2–3	W1
–	April 5	@ Reds	**Postponed (rain)** (Makeup date: Sept 1 as a split doubleheader)						
6	April 7	Rangers	2–0	**Stroman** (2–0)	Eovaldi (1–1)	**Fulmer** (1)	29,094	3–3	W2
7	April 8	Rangers	10–3	**Steele** (1–0)	Pérez (1–1)	—	33,578	4–3	W3
8	April 9	Rangers	2–8	Gray (1–1)	**Taillon** (0–2)	—	28,807	4–4	L1
9	April 10	Mariners	3–2 (10)	**Thompson** (1–0)	Brash (0–1)	—	26,766	5–4	W1
10	April 11	Mariners	14–9	**Rucker** (1–0)	Flexen (0–2)	—	30,081	6–4	W2
11	April 12	Mariners	2–5	Gilbert (1–1)	**Stroman** (2–1)	—	26,944	6–5	L1
12	April 14	@ Dodgers	8–2	**Steele** (2–0)	Syndergaard (0–2)	—	52,298	7–5	W1
13	April 15	@ Dodgers	1–2	Miller (1–0)	**Fulmer** (0–1)	—	52,375	7–6	L1
14	April 16	@ Dodgers	3–2	**Smyly** (1–1)	Urías (3–1)	**Boxberger** (1)	52,180	8–6	W1
15	April 17	@ Athletics	10–1	**Wesneski** (1–0)	Muller (0–1)	—	4,714	9–6	W2
16	April 18	@ Athletics	4–0	**Leiter Jr.** (1–0)	May (2–3)	—	5,196	10–6	W3
17	April 19	@ Athletics	12–2	**Steele** (3–0)	Smith (1–1)	—	12,112	11–6	W4
18	April 20	Dodgers	2–6	Ferguson (1–0)	**Fulmer** (0–2)	—	32,817	11–7	L1
19	April 21	Dodgers	13–0	**Smyly** (2–1)	Urías (3–2)	—	30,381	12–7	W1
20	April 22	Dodgers	4–9	May (2–1)	**Wesneski** (1–1)	—	35,076	12–8	L1
21	April 23	Dodgers	3–7	Kershaw (4–1)	**Stroman** (2–2)	Graterol (1)	33,494	12–9	L2
22	April 25	Padres	6–0	**Steele** (4–0)	Snell (0–4)	—	27,956	13–9	W1
23	April 26	Padres	3–5	Martinez (2–1)	**Hughes** (0–1)	Hader (9)	28,955	13–10	L1
24	April 27	Padres	5–2	**Wesneski** (2–1)	Lugo (2–2)	**Boxberger** (2)	26,588	14–10	W1
25	April 28	@ Marlins	2–3	Puk (3–0)	**Rucker** (1–1)	—	12,340	14–11	L1
26	April 29	@ Marlins	6–7	Cabrera (2–2)	**Kilian** (0–1)	Scott (2)	14,994	14–12	L2
27	April 30	@ Marlins	3–4	Scott (2–1)	**Thompson** (1–1)	Puk (5)	20,345	14–13	L3

May: 10–18 (Home: 7–8; Road: 3–10)

#	Date	Opponent	Score	Win	Loss	Save	Attendance	Record	Streak/ Box
28	May 1	@ Nationals	5–1	**Smyly** (3–1)	Gore (3–2)	—	13,722	15–13	W1
29	May 2	@ Nationals	1–4	Harvey (1–0)	**Thompson** (1–2)	Finnegan (6)	12,504	15–14	L1
30	May 3	@ Nationals	1–2	Edwards Jr. (1–1)	**Alzolay** (1–1)	Finnegan (7)	15,903	15–15	L2
31	May 4	@ Nationals	3–4	Finnegan (1–1)	**Boxberger** (0–1)	—	18,577	15–16	L3
32	May 5	Marlins	4–1	**Steele** (5–0)	Cabrera (2–3)	**Leiter Jr.** (1)	31,181	16–16	W1
33	May 6	Marlins	4–2	**Thompson** (2–2)	Puk (3–1)	**Alzolay** (1)	36,418	17–16	W2
34	May 7	Marlins	4–5 (14)	Okert (1–0)	**Alzolay** (1–2)	Nardi (1)	38,196	17–17	L1
35	May 8	Cardinals	1–3	Cabrera (1–0)	**Stroman** (2–3)	Helsley (4)	30,937	17–18	L2
36	May 9	Cardinals	4–6	Stratton (1–0)	**Assad** (0–2)	Gallegos (2)	32,693	17–19	L3
37	May 10	Cardinals	10–4	**Steele** (6–0)	Montgomery (2–5)	—	36,413	18–19	W1
38	May 12	@ Twins	6–2	**Smyly** (4–1)	Jax (2–5)	—	30,037	19–19	W2
39	May 13	@ Twins	1–11	Ryan (6–1)	**Wesneski** (2–2)	—	32,270	19–20	L1
40	May 14	@ Twins	3–16	Varland (1–0)	**Stroman** (2–4)	—	33,419	19–21	L2
41	May 15	@ Astros	4–6	Montero (1–3)	**Fulmer** (0–3)	Neris (2)	35,413	19–22	L3
42	May 16	@ Astros	3–7	Javier (4–1)	**Steele** (6–1)	—	34,280	19–23	L4
43	May 17	@ Astros	6–7	Abreu (2–0)	**Hughes** (0–2)	—	35,749	19–24	L5
44	May 19	@ Phillies	10–1	**Stroman** (3–4)	Suárez (0–1)	—	42,110	20–24	W1
45	May 20	@ Phillies	3–12	Nola (4–3)	**Taillon** (0–3)	—	42,508	20–25	L1
46	May 21	@ Phillies	1–2	Strahm (4–3)	**Alzolay** (1–3)	Kimbrel (5)	44,108	20–26	L2
47	May 23	Mets	7–2	**Smyly** (5–1)	Megill (5–3)	—	35,958	21–26	W1
48	May 24	Mets	4–2	**Stroman** (4–4)	Senga (4–3)	**Leiter Jr.** (2)	33,636	22–26	W2
49	May 25	Mets	1–10	Carrasco (1–2)	**Hendricks** (0–1)	—	35,446	22–27	L1
50	May 26	Reds	0–9	Greene (1–4)	**Steele** (6–2)	—	31,946	22–28	L2
51	May 27	Reds	5–8	Farmer (1–3)	**Fulmer** (0–4)	Díaz (11)	36,372	22–29	L3
52	May 28	Reds	5–8	Ashcraft (3–3)	**Smyly** (5–2)	Díaz (12)	40,551	22–30	L4
53	May 29	Rays	1–0	**Stroman** (5–4)	Bradley (3–2)	—	38,163	23–30	W1
54	May 30	Rays	2–1	**Merryweather** (1–0)	McClanahan (8–1)	**Alzolay** (2)	31,762	24–30	W2
55	May 31	Rays	3–4	Poche (4–1)	**Leiter Jr.** (1–1)	Beeks (1)	29,360	24–31	L1

June: 14–11 (Home: 6–4; Road: 8–7)

#	Date	Opponent	Score	Win	Loss	Save	Attendance	Record	Streak/ Box
56	June 2	@ Padres	2–1	**Taillon** (1–3)	Wacha (5–2)	**Leiter Jr.** (3)	43,593	25–31	W1
57	June 3	@ Padres	0–6	Darvish (4–4)	**Smyly** (5–3)	—	42,655	25–32	L1
58	June 4	@ Padres	7–1	**Stroman** (6–4)	Weathers (1–4)	—	44,811	26–32	W1
59	June 5	@ Padres	0–5	Snell (2–6)	**Hendricks** (0–2)	—	43,629	26–33	L1
60	June 6	@ Angels	4–7	Anderson (3–1)	**Hughes** (0–3)	Estévez (15)	27,716	26–34	L2
61	June 7	@ Angels	2–6	Joyce (1–0)	**Taillon** (1–4)	—	28,817	26–35	L3
62	June 8	@ Angels	1–3	Detmers (1–5)	**Smyly** (5–4)	Estévez (16)	28,179	26–36	L4
63	June 9	@ Giants	3–2	**Stroman** (7–4)	DeSclafani (4–6)	**Alzolay** (3)	34,816	27–36	W1
64	June 10	@ Giants	4–0	**Hendricks** (1–2)	Junis (3–3)	—	35,452	28–36	W2
65	June 11	@ Giants	3–13	Beck (1–0)	**Wesneski** (2–3)	—	36,842	28–37	L1
66	June 13	Pirates	11–3	**Taillon** (2–4)	Ortiz (1–3)	—	33,740	29–37	W1
67	June 14	Pirates	10–6	**Smyly** (6–4)	Contreras (3–6)	—	30,823	30–37	W2
68	June 15	Pirates	7–2	**Stroman** (8–4)	Oviedo (3–6)	—	32,881	31–37	W3
69	June 16	Orioles	10–3	**Hendricks** (2–2)	Irvin (1–3)	—	37,515	32–37	W4
70	June 17	Orioles	3–2	**Steele** (7–2)	Gibson (8–4)	**Alzolay** (4)	40,605	33–37	W5
71	June 18	Orioles	3–6	Kremer (8–3)	**Taillon** (2–5)	Bautista (19)	40,121	33–38	L1
72	June 19	@ Pirates	8–0	**Smyly** (7–4)	Bido (0–1)	—	23,083	34–38	W1
73	June 20	@ Pirates	4–0	**Stroman** (9–4)	Oviedo (3–7)	—	20,666	35–38	W2
74	June 21	@ Pirates	8–3	**Hendricks** (3–2)	Hill (6–7)	—	22,522	36–38	W3
75	June 24†	@ Cardinals	9–1	**Steele** (8–2)	Wainwright (3–2)	—	54,662	37–38	W4
76	June 25†	@ Cardinals	5–7	Woodford (2–2)	**Stroman** (9–5)	Hicks (4)	55,565	37–39	L1
77	June 27	Phillies	1–5	Suárez (2–2)	**Taillon** (2–6)	—	37,072	37–40	L2
78	June 28	Phillies	5–8	Nola (7–5)	**Smyly** (7–5)	—	32,379	37–41	L3
79	June 29	Phillies	1–3	Walker (9–3)	**Hendricks** (3–3)	Kimbrel (12)	35,090	37–42	L4
80	June 30	Guardians	10–1	**Steele** (9–2)	Quantrill (2–5)	—	32,230	38–42	W1
†The Cardinals will be the home team against the Cubs in a two-game series at London Stadium in the 2023 MLB London Series.

July: 15–11 (Home: 6–7; Road: 9–4)

#	Date	Opponent	Score	Win	Loss	Save	Attendance	Record	Streak/ Box
81	July 1	Guardians	0–6	Bibee (5–2)	**Stroman** (9–6)	—	34,342	38–43	L1
82	July 2	Guardians	6–8 (10)	Hentges (1–0)	**Alzolay** (1–4)	—	38,392	38–44	L2
83	July 3	@ Brewers	6–8	Payamps (3–1)	**Leiter Jr.** (1–2)	Williams (18)	43,209	38–45	L3
84	July 4	@ Brewers	7–6 (11)	**Palencia** (1–0)	Andrews (0–1)	—	41,103	39–45	W1
85	July 5	@ Brewers	4–3	**Rucker** (2–1)	Williams (4–2)	**Alzolay** (5)	31,285	40–45	W2
86	July 6	@ Brewers	5–6	Mejía (1–0)	**Fulmer** (0–5)	Payamps (3)	33,366	40–46	L1
87	July 7	@ Yankees	3–0	**Taillon** (3–6)	Rodón (0–1)	**Alzolay** (6)	42,763	41–46	W1
88	July 8	@ Yankees	3–6	Cole (9–2)	**Smyly** (7–6)	King (6)	43,507	41–47	L1
89	July 9	@ Yankees	7–4	**Merryweather** (2–0)	Marinaccio (4–4)	**Alzolay** (7)	43,761	42–47	W1
ASG	July 11	NL @ AL	3–2	Doval (1–0)	Bautista (0–1)	Kimbrel (1)	47,159	—	N/A
90	July 14	Red Sox	3–8	Bello (7–5)	**Hendricks** (3–4)	Jansen (20)	37,597	42–48	L1
91	July 15	Red Sox	10–4	**Stroman** (10–6)	Paxton (5–2)	—	40,224	43–48	W1
92	July 16	Red Sox	5–11	Crawford (4–4)	**Steele** (9–3)	—	37,812	43–49	L1
93	July 17	Nationals	5–7	Gore (5–7)	**Smyly** (7–7)	Finnegan (12)	29,383	43–50	L2
94	July 18	Nationals	17–3	**Fulmer** (1–5)	Willingham (0–2)	—	28,636	44–50	W1
95	July 19	Nationals	8–3	**Merryweather** (3–0)	Thompson (3–3)	—	28,197	45–50	W2
96	July 20	Cardinals	2–7	Matz (1–7)	**Stroman** (10–7)	—	34,251	45–51	L1
97	July 21	Cardinals	4–3	**Steele** (10–3)	Flaherty (7–6)	**Alzolay** (8)	38,819	46–51	W1
98	July 22	Cardinals	8–6	**Palencia** (2–0)	Thompson (2–3)	**Alzolay** (9)	40,425	47–51	W2
99	July 23	Cardinals	7–2	**Taillon** (4–6)	Montgomery (6–8)	—	38,223	48–51	W3
100	July 25	@ White Sox	7–3	**Hendricks** (4–4)	Kopech (4–9)	**Alzolay** (10)	37,079	49–51	W4
101	July 26	@ White Sox	10–7	**Assad** (1–2)	Kelly (1–5)	**Alzolay** (11)	37,214	50–51	W5
102	July 27	@ Cardinals	10–3	**Steele** (11–3)	Mikolas (6–6)	—	44,584	51–51	W6
103	July 28	@ Cardinals	3–2	**Smyly** (8–7)	Montgomery (6–9)	**Alzolay** (12)	43,424	52–51	W7
104	July 29	@ Cardinals	5–1	**Taillon** (5–6)	Wainwright (3–5)	—	44,877	53–51	W8
105	July 30	@ Cardinals	0–3	Matz (2–7)	**Hendricks** (4–5)	Romero (1)	43,670	53–52	L1
106	July 31	Reds	5–6	Farmer (3–4)	**Stroman** (10–8)	Díaz (32)	34,688	53–53	L2

August: 18–9 (Home: 10–4; Road: 8–5)

#	Date	Opponent	Score	Win	Loss	Save	Attendance	Record	Streak/ Box
107	August 1	Reds	20–9	**Steele** (12–3)	Lively (4–7)	—	33,452	54–53	W1
108	August 2	Reds	16–6	**Fulmer** (2–5)	Farmer (3–5)	—	33,991	55–53	W2
109	August 3	Reds	5–3	**Taillon** (6–6)	Weaver (2–4)	**Alzolay** (13)	35,615	56–53	W3
110	August 4	Braves	0–8	Fried (3–1)	**Hendricks** (4–6)	—	36,225	56–54	L1
111	August 5	Braves	8–6	**Fulmer** (3–5)	Elder (8–3)	—	40,201	57–54	W1
112	August 6	Braves	6–4	**Steele** (13–3)	Morton (10–10)	**Alzolay** (14)	39,015	58–54	W2
113	August 7	@ Mets	2–11	Senga (8–6)	**Smyly** (8–8)	—	29,070	58–55	L1
114	August 8	@ Mets	3–2	**Taillon** (7–6)	Smith (4–4)	**Alzolay** (15)	29,640	59–55	W1
115	August 9	@ Mets	3–4	Hartwig (4–1)	**Wesneski** (2–4)	Bickford (1)	37,527	59–56	L1
116	August 11	@ Blue Jays	6–2	**Assad** (2–2)	Berríos (9–8)	—	41,814	60–56	W1
117	August 12	@ Blue Jays	5–4	**Merryweather** (4–0)	Hicks (1–7)	**Alzolay** (16)	42,585	61–56	W2
118	August 13	@ Blue Jays	4–11	Ryu (1–1)	**Taillon** (7–7)	—	41,960	61–57	L1
119	August 15	White Sox	3–5	Ramsey (1–0)	**Merryweather** (4–1)	Santos (4)	40,389	61–58	L2
120	August 16	White Sox	4–3	**Smyly** (9–8)	Santos (2–1)	—	40,869	62–58	W1
121	August 18	Royals	3–4	Ragans (4–4)	**Taillon** (7–8)	Hernández (2)	37,936	62–59	L1
122	August 19	Royals	6–4	**Steele** (14–3)	Singer (8–9)	**Alzolay** (17)	39,525	63–59	W1
123	August 20	Royals	4–3	**Hendricks** (5–6)	Lyles (3–14)	**Alzolay** (18)	36,949	64–59	W2
124	August 21	@ Tigers	7–6	**Palencia** (3–0)	Brieske (0–1)	**Leiter Jr.** (4)	20,560	65–59	W3
125	August 22	@ Tigers	6–8	Holton (3–2)	**Smyly** (9–9)	Lange (19)	21,211	65–60	L1
126	August 23	@ Tigers	6–4	**Merryweather** (5–1)	Brieske (0–2)	**Alzolay** (19)	21,965	66–60	W1
127	August 24	@ Pirates	5–4 (10)	**Palencia** (4–0)	Hatch (1–1)	**Alzolay** (20)	14,651	67–60	W2
128	August 25	@ Pirates	1–2	Keller (11–8)	**Hendricks** (5–7)	Bednar (28)	24,379	67–61	L1
129	August 26	@ Pirates	10–6	**Wicks** (1–0)	Bido (2–5)	**Alzolay** (21)	34,782	68–61	W1
130	August 27	@ Pirates	10–1	**Assad** (3–2)	Falter (1–8)	—	19,154	69–61	W2
131	August 28	Brewers	2–6	Miley (7–3)	**Taillon** (7–9)	—	35,097	69–62	L1
132	August 29	Brewers	1–0	**Steele** (15–3)	Burnes (9–7)	**Alzolay** (22)	33,294	70–62	W1
133	August 30	Brewers	3–2	**Alzolay** (2–4)	Payamps (4–4)	—	31,769	71–62	W2

September/October: 12–17 (Home: 8–5; Road: 4–12)

#	Date	Opponent	Score	Win	Loss	Save	Attendance	Record	Streak/ Box
134	September 1 (1)	@ Reds	6–2	**Wicks** (2–0)	Ashcraft (7–9)	**Thompson** (1)	21,480	72–62	W3
135	September 1 (2)	@ Reds	2–3	Díaz (7–4)	**Alzolay** (2–5)	—	27,465	72–63	L1
136	September 2	@ Reds	1–2	Moll (1–3)	**Leiter Jr.** (1–3)	—	38,246	72–64	L2
137	September 3	@ Reds	15–7	**Palencia** (5–0)	Law (4–5)	—	37,029	73–64	W1
138	September 4	Giants	5–0	**Steele** (16–3)	Webb (9–12)	—	39,452	74–64	W2
139	September 5	Giants	11–8	**Smyly** (10–9)	Jackson (1–2)	—	28,684	75–64	W3
140	September 6	Giants	8–2	**Wicks** (3–0)	Wood (5–5)	—	27,443	76–64	W4
141	September 7	Diamondbacks	2–6	Nelson (7–7)	**Assad** (3–3)	Sewald (31)	28,814	76–65	L1
142	September 8	Diamondbacks	0–1	Gallen (15–7)	**Cuas** (3–1)	—	31,846	76–66	L2
143	September 9	Diamondbacks	2–3 (10)	Ginkel (8–0)	**Palencia** (5–1)	Sewald (32)	40,391	76–67	L3
144	September 10	Diamondbacks	5–2	**Hendricks** (6–7)	Mantiply (1–2)	**Merryweather** (1)	35,431	77–67	W1
145	September 11	@ Rockies	5–4	**Smyly** (11–9)	Kinley (0–2)	**Fulmer** (2)	30,620	78–67	W2
146	September 12	@ Rockies	4–6	Bird (3–3)	**Palencia** (5–2)	Lawrence (11)	32,058	78–68	L1
147	September 13	@ Rockies	3–7	Blach (3–1)	**Taillon** (7–10)	Kinley (3)	32,171	78–69	L2
148	September 15	@ Diamondbacks	4–6	Pfaadt (2–8)	**Steele** (16–4)	—	32,864	78–70	L3
149	September 16	@ Diamondbacks	6–7 (13)	Mantiply (2–2)	**Wesneski** (2–5)	—	35,193	78–71	L4
150	September 17	@ Diamondbacks	2–6	Frías (1–0)	**Wicks** (3–1)	—	26,307	78–72	L5
151	September 19	Pirates	14–1	**Assad** (4–3)	Falter (2–9)	—	34,202	79–72	W1
152	September 20	Pirates	7–13	Keller (13–9)	**Steele** (16–5)	—	31,491	79–73	L1
153	September 21	Pirates	6–8	Oviedo (9–14)	**Hendricks** (6–8)	—	31,544	79–74	L2
154	September 22	Rockies	6–0	**Taillon** (8–10)	Davis (0–3)	—	32,150	80–74	W1
155	September 23	Rockies	6–3	**Assad** (5–3)	Mears (0–1)	**Cuas** (1)	38,608	81–74	W2
156	September 24	Rockies	4–3	**Wicks** (4–1)	Blach (3–3)	**Merryweather** (2)	37,060	82–74	W3
157	September 26	@ Braves	6–7	Hand (5–2)	**Smyly** (11–10)	Iglesias (31)	40,151	82–75	L1
158	September 27	@ Braves	5–6 (10)	Chavez (1–0)	**Palencia** (5–3)	—	37,246	82–76	L2
159	September 28	@ Braves	3–5	Wright (1–3)	**Stroman** (10–9)	Iglesias (32)	40,249	82–77	L3
160	September 29	@ Brewers	3–4 (10)	Boushley (1–0)	**Cuas** (3–2)	—	39,216	82–78	L4
161	September 30	@ Brewers	10–6	**Wesneski** (3–5)	Lauer (4–6)	**Taillon** (1)	42,652	83–78	W1
162	October 1	@ Brewers	0–4	Houser (8–5)	**Smyly** (11–11)	—	42,946	83–79	L1

=== Season standings ===
==== National League Central ====
NL Central
Team	W	L	Pct.	GB	Home	Road
Milwaukee Brewers	92	70	.568	—	49‍–‍32	43‍–‍38
Chicago Cubs	83	79	.512	9	45‍–‍36	38‍–‍43
Cincinnati Reds	82	80	.506	10	38‍–‍43	44‍–‍37
Pittsburgh Pirates	76	86	.469	16	39‍–‍42	37‍–‍44
St. Louis Cardinals	71	91	.438	21	35‍–‍46	36‍–‍45

==== National League Wild Card ====
Division leaders
Team	W	L	Pct.
Atlanta Braves	104	58	.642
Los Angeles Dodgers	100	62	.617
Milwaukee Brewers	92	70	.568

Wild Card teams (Top 3 teams qualify for postseason)
Team	W	L	Pct.	GB
Philadelphia Phillies	90	72	.556	+6
Miami Marlins	84	78	.519	—
Arizona Diamondbacks	84	78	.519	—
Chicago Cubs	83	79	.512	1
San Diego Padres	82	80	.506	2
Cincinnati Reds	82	80	.506	2
San Francisco Giants	79	83	.488	5
Pittsburgh Pirates	76	86	.469	8
New York Mets	75	87	.463	9
St. Louis Cardinals	71	91	.438	13
Washington Nationals	71	91	.438	13
Colorado Rockies	59	103	.364	25

=== Record vs. opponents ===
==== Record vs. National League ====
2023 National League record Source: MLB Standings Grid – 2023
Team	AZ	ATL	CHC	CIN	COL	LAD	MIA	MIL	NYM	PHI	PIT	SD	SF	STL	WSH	AL
Arizona	—	3–3	6–1	3–4	10–3	5–8	2–4	4–2	1–6	3–4	4–2	7–6	7–6	3–3	5–1	21–25
Atlanta	3–3	—	4–2	5–1	7–0	4–3	9–4	5–1	10–3	8–5	4–3	3–4	4–2	4–2	8–5	26–20
Chicago	1–6	2–4	—	6–7	4–2	3–4	2–4	6–7	3–3	1–5	10–3	4–3	5–1	8–5	3–4	25–21
Cincinnati	4–3	1–5	7–6	—	4–2	4–2	3–3	3–10	4–2	3–4	5–8	3–3	3–4	6–7	4–3	28–18
Colorado	3–10	0–7	2–4	2–4	—	3–10	5–2	4–2	4–2	2–5	2–4	4–9	4–9	3–3	3–4	18–28
Los Angeles	8–5	3–4	4–3	2–4	10–3	—	3–3	5–1	3–3	4–2	4–3	9–4	7–6	4–3	4–2	30–16
Miami	4–2	4–9	4–2	3–3	2–5	3–3	—	3–4	4–8	7–6	5–2	2–4	3–3	3–4	11–2	26–20
Milwaukee	2–4	1–5	7–6	10–3	2–4	1–5	4–3	—	6–1	4–2	8–5	6–1	2–5	8–5	3–3	28–18
New York	6–1	3–10	3–3	2–4	2–4	3–3	8–4	1–6	—	6–7	3–3	3–3	4–3	4–3	7–6	19–27
Philadelphia	4–3	5–8	5–1	4–3	5–2	2–4	6–7	2–4	7–6	—	3–3	5–2	2–4	5–1	7–6	28–18
Pittsburgh	2–4	3–4	3–10	8–5	4–2	3–4	2–5	5–8	3–3	3–3	—	5–1	2–4	9–4	5–2	19–27
San Diego	6–7	4–3	3–4	3–3	9–4	4–9	4–2	1–6	3–3	2–5	1–5	—	8–5	3–3	3–3	28–18
San Francisco	6–7	2–4	1–5	4–3	9–4	6–7	3–3	5–2	3–4	4–2	4–2	5–8	—	6–1	1–5	20–26
St. Louis	3–3	2–4	5–8	7–6	3–3	3–4	4–3	5–8	3–4	1–5	4–9	3–3	1–6	—	4–2	23–23
Washington	1–5	5–8	4–3	3–4	4–3	2–4	2–11	3–3	6–7	6–7	2–5	3–3	5–1	2–4	—	23–23

Updated with the results of all games through October 1, 2023.

==== Record vs. American League ====
2023 National League record vs. American League Source: MLB Standings
Team	BAL	BOS	CWS	CLE	DET	HOU	KC	LAA	MIN	NYY	OAK	SEA	TB	TEX	TOR
Arizona	1–2	1–2	2–1	2–1	3–0	0–3	2–1	2–1	0–3	1–2	2–1	1–2	1–2	3–1	0–3
Atlanta	2–1	1–3	1–2	2–1	2–1	0–3	3–0	2–1	3–0	3–0	1–2	2–1	2–1	2–1	0–3
Chicago	2–1	1–2	3–1	1–2	2–1	0–3	2–1	0–3	1–2	2–1	3–0	2–1	2–1	2–1	2–1
Cincinnati	2–1	2–1	1–2	2–2	2–1	3–0	3–0	3–0	1–2	0–3	2–1	2–1	1–2	3–0	1–2
Colorado	1–2	2–1	2–1	2–1	1–2	1–3	2–1	2–1	1–2	2–1	1–2	0–3	0–3	0–3	1–2
Los Angeles	2–1	2–1	2–1	2–1	2–1	2–1	1–2	4–0	2–1	1–2	3–0	3–0	1–2	2–1	1–2
Miami	0–3	3–0	2–1	2–1	2–1	1–2	3–0	3–0	2–1	2–1	3–0	1–2	1–3	0–3	1–2
Milwaukee	2–1	1–2	3–0	2–1	1–2	2–1	3–0	2–1	2–2	2–1	0–3	3–0	1–2	3–0	1–2
New York	0–3	1–2	2–1	3–0	0–3	1–2	0–3	1–2	1–2	2–2	3–0	2–1	2–1	1–2	0–3
Philadelphia	2–1	1–2	2–1	1–2	3–0	2–1	2–1	2–1	1–2	1–2	3–0	2–1	3–0	0–3	3–1
Pittsburgh	1–2	3–0	2–1	1–2	2–2	1–2	3–0	1–2	1–2	1–2	1–2	1–2	0–3	1–2	0–3
San Diego	2–1	1–2	3–0	2–1	2–1	1–2	1–2	3–0	1–2	1–2	3–0	1–3	2–1	3–0	2–1
San Francisco	1–2	2–1	2–1	2–1	0–3	2–1	1–2	1–2	2–1	1–2	2–2	1–2	1–2	1–2	1–2
St. Louis	2–1	3–0	2–1	1–2	1–2	1–2	2–2	0–3	1–2	2–1	2–1	1–2	2–1	1–2	2–1
Washington	0–4	2–1	2–1	1–2	2–1	1–2	2–1	1–2	2–1	2–1	3–0	2–1	0–3	2–1	1–2

Updated with the results of all games through October 1, 2023.

=== Opening Day starters ===
Thursday, March 30, 2023 vs. Milwaukee Brewers at Wrigley Field

Name	Pos.
Nico Hoerner	2B
Dansby Swanson	SS
Ian Happ	LF
Cody Bellinger	CF
Trey Mancini	DH
Yan Gomes	C
Eric Hosmer	1B
Patrick Wisdom	3B
Miles Mastrobuoni	RF
Marcus Stroman	P

=== Season summary ===
==== March ====
- **March 22** – The Cubs announced that Marcus Stroman would be the Opening Day starting pitcher.
- **March 30** – In the first game of the season, the Cubs faced the Milwaukee Brewers at Wrigley Field. Marcus Stroman pitched six scoreless innings for the win while three relievers combined to shut out the Brewers 4–0. Dansby Swanson had three hits and drove in a run in his Cub debut.

==== April ====
- **April 1** – After a scheduled off day, the Cubs resumed their three-game series with the Brewers. Justin Steele pitched six scoreless innings and left with a 1–0 lead. However, Javier Assad allowed three runs in 1.1 innings of relief as the Cubs lost 3–1. Dansby Swanson continued his hot start to the season, notching three hits while Ian Happ hit the Cubs' first homer of the season.
- **April 2** – In the finale of the opening series, Jameson Taillon made his Cub debut and gave up three runs on seven hits in four innings of work. New Cub Julian Merryweather also struggled, allowing five runs while only getting two outs. Patrick Wisdom hit two home runs for the Cubs, but it was not enough as they lost 9–5 to the Brewers.
- **April 3** – In their first road game of the season the Cubs visited Cincinnati to face the Reds. Drew Smyly struggled, allowing seven runs in 4.2 innings of work. Cody Bellinger hit his first home run as a Cub and drove in three runs. Dansby Swanson added three hits while Eric Hosmer drove in three. Keegan Thompson pitched 3.1 innings of scoreless relief, but it was not enough as the Cubs lost 7–6.
- **April 4** – Hayden Wesneski pitched 4.2 innings and allowed three runs in his season debut against the Reds. However, the Cub offense picked up the pitching, as Patrick Wisdom, Ian Happ, and Nico Hoerner each had three hits in the game. Trey Manicini and Wisdom each drove in three runs as the Cubs used a six-run seventh to pull away for the easy 12–5 win.
- **April 7** – Following a rainout and scheduled off day, the Cubs returned home to face the Texas Rangers. Marcus Stroman again pitched well, going six innings and allowing no runs. Ian Happ and Cody Bellinger each drove in a run as the Cubs shut out the Rangers 2–0.
- **April 8** – In game two of the series against the Rangers, Ian Happ drove in three runs while Eric Hosmer drove in two. Patrick Wisdom hit his third home run of the season while Justin Steele allowed only one run in six innings. The Cubs won their third straight 10–3.
- **April 9** – In the finale of the season series against the Rangers, Jameson Taillon allowed five runs in six innings while Javier Assad allowed three runs in three innings of relief as the Cubs lost 8–2. Edwin Ríos hit his first home run as a Cub in the loss.
- **April 10** – The Cubs stayed at Wrigley to face the Seattle Mariners. Drew Smyly allowed one run in five innings and the Cubs led 2–1 on RBIs by Cody Bellinger and Eric Hosmer. However, in the top of the ninth, Michael Fulmer allowed a game-tying homer to Jarred Kelenic. In extras, Keegan Thompson pitched out of a bases loaded jam to take the game to the bottom of the 10th still tied. Nick Madrigal, the Manfred runner at second to start the inning, stole third before Nico Hoerner singled him in for the 3–2 win.
- **April 11** – Hayden Wesneski allowed seven runs in 1.1 innings as the Cubs fell behind 7–0 to the Mariners. However, a two-run home run for Trey Mancini and Nelson Velázquez's grand slam as part of an eight-run third inning gave the Cubs the lead. The Cub bullpen allowed only two runs in 7.2 innings of relief as the Cubs came from behind to notch a 14–9 win. Nico Hoerner had two RBIs and scored three runs while Dansby Swanson also drove in two in the win.
- **April 12** – In the finale of the series against the Mariners, Marcus Stroman again pitched well, allowing his first two runs of the season in six innings. The Cub bullpen allowed three more runs as the Cubs scored only two runs and lost 5–2.
- **April 14** – After an off day, the Cubs traveled to Los Angeles to face the Dodgers. Justin Steele pitched seven innings while allowing only two runs. Meanwhile, the Cub offense hit five home runs with Yan Gomes hitting two of them. Ian Happ had four hits, including a homer, and drove in three. Seiya Suzuki homered in his return to the lineup as the Cubs beat the Dodgers 8–2.
- **April 15** – In game two of the series against the Dodgers, Jameson Taillon allowed no runs in five innings. The Cub bullpen allowed only one base runner until the ninth when Michael Fulmer allowed three hits to lose the game as the Cubs lost 2–1. Patrick Wisdom hit his fifth homer of the season in the loss.
- **April 16** – In the finale of the series against the Dodgers, Patrick Wisdom and Cody Bellinger hit back-to-back home runs in the sixth while Bellinger scored the Cubs' first run of the game in the fifth. Drew Smyly allowed only one run in 5.2 innings of work as the Cubs won their third straight series, beating the Dodger 3–2.
- **April 17** – The Cubs next visited the Athletics in Oakland. Patrick Wisdom homered twice and drove in four runs as the Cubs clobbered the A's 10–1. Cody Bellinger had a career-high five hits while Ian Happ drove in three runs in the easy win. Hayden Wesneski allowed only one run in seven innings to earn the win. The win moved the Cubs to 9–6 on the season.
- **April 18** – In the second game of the series against the A's, Marcus Stroman continued his hot start to the season by pitching six scoreless innings and allowing only two hits. The game went to the eighth still in scoreless tie before the Cubs scored four runs to take a 4–0 lead. The Cub bullpen shut out the A's as the Cubs notched their third straight win while the A's lost their sixth straight. The 4–0 win moved the Cubs to 9–3 in the prior 12 games.
- **April 19** – In the finale of the series against the A's, Justin Steele pitched six scoreless innings and allowed only one earned run. The Cub offense added four runs in the sixth and five in the ninth to win the game 12–2. Eric Hosmer hit his first home run as a Cub while Patrick Wisdom, Ian Happ, and Nick Madrigal each drove in two in the win. The win was the Cubs' fourth in a row, all on the road.
- **April 20** – Returning home to face the Dodgers in a four-game series, Javier Assad made a spot start for the injured Jameson Taillon. He allowed two runs in three innings of work. The Cub bullpen pitched well in relief, holding the Dodgers scoreless until the ninth. With the game tied at two, Michael Fulmer got into a bases loaded jam before allowing a grand slam by James Outman as the Cubs lost 6–2.
- **April 21** – In game two of the series against the Dodgers, Drew Smyly pitched seven perfect innings before allowing a hit to the first batter in the eighth. Nico Heorner homered and drove in four runs while Patrick Wisdom, Trey Mancini, and Cody Bellinger also homered as the Cubs blew out the Dodgers 13–0.
- **April 22** – In the third game of the series against the Dodgers, Haden Wesneski allowed three runs in 4.1 innings of work. the Cub bullpen surrendered an additional six runs as the Cubs lost 9–4. Nico Hoerner homered for the second consecutive day and drove in two runs in the loss. The loss dropped the Cubs to 12–8 on the season.
- **April 23** – In the finale of the season series against the Dodgers, Marcus Stroman, who had only allowed two runs in four previous starts, gave up five runs in five innings. Yan Gomes homered while Cody Bellinger and Seiya Suzuki each drove in a run. But, it was not enough as the Cubs lost 7–3.
- **April 25** – After an off day, the San Diego Padres came to Wrigley for a three-game series. Yan Gomes went four for four with a homer and three RBIs as the Cubs beat the Padres 6–0. Nico Hoerner drove in three with a bases loaded triple in the eighth to secure the win. Justin Steele pitched 5.1 scoreless innings and four relievers shut out the Padres.
- **April 26** – In game two of the series against the Padres, Drew Smyly allowed two runs in five innings while the bullpen surrendered three more runs. Trey Mancini homered and drove in two runs, but it was not enough as the Cubs lost 5–3.
- **April 27** – In the finale of the homestand, Haden Wesneski allowed only one run in five innings of work. Eric Hosmer and Nelson Velásquez hit back-to-back home runs in the second while Dansby Swanson hit his first home run of the season. The Cub bullpen only allowed one run in relief as the Cubs beat the Padres 5–2. The win moved the Cubs to 14–10 on the season.
- **April 28** – The Cubs went on the road to face the Miami Marlins in Miami. Marcus Stroman allowed two runs in 6.1 innings of work. Nelson Velásquez homered and Nico Hoerner drove in a run in the game. However, with the game tied at two in the ninth, Michael Rucker gave up a single, hit the next two batters and then gave up the game-running single as the Cubs lost 3–2.
- **April 29** – Making his first start of the year, Caleb Kilian allowed seven runs and 10 hits in 3.1 innings. The Cub bullpen pitched masterfully, shutting out the Marlins for the final four innings. Patrick Wisdom hit a two-run homer in the second and Cody Bellinger added a homer in the sixth as the Cubs drew within one run in the eighth, but get no further as they lost their second straight to the Marlins, 7–6.
- **April 30** – In the finale of the series against the Marlins, Justin Steele allowed three runs (two earned) in six innings. Cody Bellinger hit a homer for the second consecutive day and drove in two, but the Cubs lost again 4–3, their third straight loss by one run. The Marlins' sweep of the Cubs dropped the Cubs to 14–13 on the season.

==== May ====
- **May 1** – The Cubs next traveled to Washington, D.C. to face the Nationals for a four-game series. Drew Smyly pitched seven innings and allowed only one run. Dansby Swanson and Ian Happ homered as the Cubs beat the Nationals 5–1.
- **May 2** – Haden Wesneski pitched well, allowing only one run in six innings, but Keegan Thompson allowed three runs while only getting only one out as the Cubs lost to the Nationals 4–1.
- **May 3** – In game three against the Nationals, Marcus Stroman allowed only one run in six innings. However, the bullpen again surrendered the lead as Adbert Alzolay allowed a run and three hits while only getting two outs as the Cubs lost 2–1. The loss dropped the Cubs to 15–15 on the season.
- **May 4** – In the finale of the series against the Nationals, Jameson Taillon returned to the rotation and allowed three runs in three innings. The Cubs tied the game at three in the eighth on a Nico Hoerner single. With the game tied at three in the bottom of the ninth, Alex Call hit the winning home run on the first pitch as the Cubs lost their sixth game in the prior seven. The loss moved the Cubs under .500 on the season.
- **May 5** – Returning home to face the Marlins, Justin Steele pitched seven innings while allowing only one run. Ian Happ hit a two-run home run in the fifth and Matt Mervis, playing in his first major league game, drove in a run as the Cubs won 4–1.
- **May 6** – In game two of the series against the Marlins, Drew Smyly allowed two runs in 3.1 innings and the Cubs trailed 2–1 going into the eighth. In the eighth, Nick Madrigal drove in two runs and Miguel Amaya got his first major league hit to drive in another run as the Cubs won 4–2. The win moved the Cubs back to a game over .500.
- **May 7** – In the finale of the series against the Marlins, the Cubs trailed 2–0 entering the bottom of the ninth. Cory Bellinger doubled in a run and scored on an Eric Hosmer single to tie the game and force extra innings. Both teams scored in the 10th and 13th, but the game remained tied at four entering the 14th inning. Adbert Alzolay balked in a run from third and the Cubs could not push across the tying run as they lost 5–4.
- **May 8** – The Cubs next played the last place St. Louis Cardinals at Wrigley Field. Marcus Stroman pitched six innings while allowing two runs. However, former Cub Willson Contreras doubled and drove in two runs for the Cardinals as the Cubs lost 3–1. The loss dropped the Cubs to 17–18 on the season. Nico Hoerner left the game with an apparent hamstring injury.
- **May 9** – In game two of the series against the Cardinals, Jameson Taillon gave four runs in 2.2 innings. Javier Assad pitched 5.1 innings of relief, but allowed two runs in the top of the ninth as the Cubs lost 6–4. Christopher Morel, called up to replace the injured Hoerner, homered in his season debut while Dansby Swanson homered, doubled twice, and drove in three in the loss.
- **May 10** – In the finale of the series against the Cardinals, Justin Steele pitched six innings and allows three runs. Yan Gomes, returning from the injured list, had three hits including a two-run home run. Patrick Wisdom added a two-run homer as well as the Cubs blew out the Cardinals 10–4 to avoid the sweep.
- **May 12** – After an off day, the Cubs traveled to play the Minnesota Twins. Trailing 2–1 in the seventh, Matt Mervis doubled in a run and Yan Gomes drove in Mervis to give the Cubs a 3–2 lead. Christopher Morel added his second home run of the season while Cody Bellinger drove in a run in the ninth as the Cubs won 6–2.
- **May 13** – In game two of the series, Haden Wesneski allowed seven runs in five innings as the Twins blew out the Cubs 11–1.
- **May 14** – In the finale of the series against the Twins, the Cubs were blown out again, losing 16–3. Marcus Stroman surrendered six runs in 2.2 innings while the Cub bullpen allowed six more runs. Pitching the ninth in the blowout, IF Miles Mastrobuoni allowed four runs while getting only one out. The loss dropped the Cubs to 19–21 on the season.
- **May 15** – The Cubs next travelled to Houston to face the Astros. Jameson Taillon gave up four runs in 4.2 innings, but Christopher Morel's fourth home run in six games, a three-run homer, tied the game at four in the fourth. However, Michael Fulmer allowed a two-run homer to Alex Bregman in the seventh that gave the Astros the 6–4 win. Cody Bellinger left the game with an apparent leg injury after making a jumping catch against the wall in the seventh.
- **May 16** – In game two against the Astros, Justin Steele allowed five runs in six innings while the bullpen allowed two runs. Matt Mervis hit his first career home run and Seiya Suzuki hit his third of the season, but it was not enough as the Cubs lost 7–3. The loss marked the Cubs fourth in a row and seventh in the prior nine games.
- **May 17** – In the finale of the series against the Astros, Seiya Suzuki hit home runs in his first two at-bats while Christopher Morel homered again to give the Cubs a 6–1 lead. Drew Smyly allowed only one run in six innings as the Cubs looked to end their losing streak. However, Mark Leiter Jr. allowed two runs in the eighth and Keegan Thompson gave up three runs while facing only three batters in the ninth as the Astros rallied for the 7–6 win.
- **May 19** – After an off day, the Cubs travelled to Philadelphia to face the Phillies. Marcus Stroman allowed only one run in three innings while the Cub bullpen shut out the Phillies. Nico Hoerner, returning to the lineup from the injured list, had three hits and drove in four runs. Christopher Morel homered and drove in two runs as the Cubs blew out the Phillies 10–1.
- **May 20** – In game two of the series against the Phillies, James Taillon gave up eight runs in 2.1 innings while the Cub bullpens surrendered four runs in relief as the Cubs were blown out 12–3. Christopher Morel homered again for the Cubs, his seventh homer in 10 games, in the loss.
- **May 21** – After struggling in his previous outing, Justin Steele pitched six scoreless innings. However, Adbert Alzolay gave up two runs in relief as the Cubs lost their seventh game in the prior eight. Christopher Morel hit his eighth homer, in only his 10th game of the season, as the Cubs lost 2–1.
- **May 23** – After an off day, the Cubs returned home to face the New York Mets. Drew Smyly pitched five-plus innings and allowed only two runs. Matt Mervis homered and drove in three runs as the Cubs won easily 7–2. Christopher Morel homered for the ninth time in his 12 games on the season and for the fifth consecutive game which tied a franchise record held by Sammy Sosa.
- **May 24** – Marcus Stroman pitched eight innings while allowing only two runs and four hits as the Cubs beat the Mets 4–2. Mark Leiter Jr. pitched a perfect ninth for the save. Nico Hoerner homered for the Cubs while Dansby Swanson, Seiya Suzuki and Mike Tauchman each drove in a run in the win.
- **May 25** – Kyle Hendricks returned to the mound for the first time on the season and allowed five runs, three earned, in 4.1 innings of work. Michael Rucker allowed five runs in 2.2 innings of relief and Tucker Barnhart pitched a scoreless inning of relief as the Cubs were blown out by the Mets 10–1.
- **May 26** – Justin Steele allowed six runs and 10 hits in 3.2 innings of work as the Cincinnati Reds blew out the Cubs 9–0. The Cubs managed only two hits while surrendering 19 in the loss.
- **May 27** – James Taillon continued his struggles on the season as he allowed four runs in 4.2 innings. The Cub bullpen also allowed four runs. Ian Happ and Dansby Swanson each drove in two runs, but it was not enough as the Cubs lost 8–5.
- **May 28** – Patrick Wisdom homered twice and drove in all five runs, but Cub pitching again struggled. Drew Smyly allowed five runs in 4.2 innings while the bullpen surrendered three more runs. The 8–5 loss was the Cubs fourth straight as they were swept by the Reds.
- **May 29** – On Memorial Day, the Cubs faced the best team in baseball, the Tampa Bay Rays, at Wrigley Field. Marcus Stroman pitched a complete game shutout while Mike Tauchman drove in the only run as the Cubs won 1–0.
- **May 30** – Kyle Hendricks pitched five innings and allowed only one run while the Cub bullpen shut out the Rays. Nico Hoerner homered on the first pitch of the bottom of the first and Mike Tauchman drove in a run in the sixth to give the Cubs the 2–1 win.
- **May 31** – In the finale of the series against the Rays, Justin Steele pitched six perfect innings before leaving with an arm issue. Haden Wesneski pitched 3.2 innings of relief and allowed only run. However, Mark Leiter Jr. surrendered two home runs as the Cubs lost 4–3.

==== June ====
- **June 2** – After an off day, the Cubs travelled to San Diego to face the Padres. Jameson Taillon pitched well, allowing only one run in 5.2 innings. The Cub bullpen also pitched well, shutting out the Padres in 3.1 innings of relief. An Ian Happ fielder's choice gave the Cubs the lead and Dansby Swanson homered to give the Cubs the 2–1 win.
- **June 3** – In game two of the series, Drew Smyly allowed three runs in 5.2 innings while Jeremiah Estrada allowed three in the eighth as the Padres shut out the Cubs 6–0.
- **June 4** – Yan Gomes and Trey Mancini hit back-to-back home runs in the second and Miguel Amaya had three hits, including his first career home run in the third, as the Cubs blew out the Padres 7–1. Marcus Stroman allowed one run in six innings and the Cub bullpen shut out the Padres for the Cubs' fourth win in the previous six games.
- **June 5** – In the finale of the series against the Padres, Kyle Hendricks allowed four runs in six innings as the Cubs were shut out 5–0.
- **June 6** – The Cubs next traveled to Anaheim to face the Angels. The Cubs took an early 4–0 lead on a two-run single by Mike Tauchman and a two-run double by Matt Mervis. However, the Cubs allowed five runs in the fifth as they lost to the Angels 7–4.
- **June 7** – In game two of the series with the Angels, Jameson Taillon gave up four runs in 5.1 innings and Mark Leiter Jr. allowed two more as the Cubs lost 6–2.
- **June 8** – In the finale of the series against the Angels, Drew Smyly allowed three runs in six innings, but the Cubs only managed one run as they were swept by the Angels 3–1. The loss dropped the Cubs 10 games under .500 (26–36) on the season.
- **June 9** – The Cubs next travelled to San Francisco to face the Giants. Marcus Stroman allowed two runs in 6.2 innings while Nico Hoerner drove in two with a pinch-hit single in the seventh. Tucker Barnhart drove in the third run of the game as the Cubs held on for the 3–2 win.
- **June 10** – Kyle Hendricks took a no-hitter into the eighth as the Cubs shut out the Giants 4–0. Matt Mervis and Christopher Morel each hit solo home runs while Morel drove in two more runs in the win.
- **June 11** – Hayden Wesneski allowed five runs in three innings while the Cub bullpen allowed eight as the Cubs were blown out by the Giants 13–3.
- **June 13** – After an off day, the Cubs returned home to face the Pittsburgh Pirates. Ian Happ homered and drove in four runs while Christopher Morel also homered and drove in three as the Cubs blew out the Pirates 11–3. Jameson Taillon pitched six innings while allowing only three runs in the win.
- **June 14** – In game two against the Pirates, the Cubs fell behind 5–1 early. However, a six-run sixth inning, led by Dansby Swanson's two hits in the inning, gave the Cubs the lead. They stretched the lead again in the eighth and won 10–6. Swanson and Mike Tauchman each had three hits in the game while four different Cubs drove in two runs.
- **June 15** – Marcus Stroman allowed two runs in six innings of work while Ian Happ and Christopher Morel each drove in two runs. Cody Bellinger, in his first game back from the injured list, played first and drove in a run as the Cubs won 7–2 to sweep the series against the Pirates. The win moved the Cubs six games under .500, only 3.5 games out of first in the mediocre division.
- **June 16** – The Baltimore Orioles next visited Wrigley for a three-game series. In game one, Kyle Hendricks allowed two runs in five innings while Dansby Swanson, Miguel Amaya, and Christopher Morel homered for the Cubs. Morel drove in three runs while Nico Hoerner and Ian Happ drove in two as the Cubs won their fourth straight, beating the Orioles 10–3.
- **June 17** – In the second game of the series, Justin Steele returned from the injured list and allowed two runs in five innings. The Cub bullpen shut out the Orioles the rest of the way as the Cubs won 3–2. Nico Hoerner again drove in two runs in the win.
- **June 18** – In the finale of the series against the Orioles, James Taillon allowed four runs in 5.1 innings and the Cubs only managed three. The Cub bullpen allowed two more runs as the Cubs lost 6–3, breaking their five-game winning streak.
- **June 19** – The Cubs next travelled to Pittsburgh to face the Pirates again. Drew Smyly and three relievers shut out of the Pirates. Mike Tauchman drove in three runs while Nico Hoerner knocked in two in the 8–0 win. The win moved the Cubs to four games under .500 on the season (34–38).
- **June 20** – Marcus Stroman pitched seven shutout innings and two Cub relievers shut out the Pirates as well as the Cubs won 4–0. Tucker Barnhart hit his first homer of the season and Mike Tauchman added his second as the Cubs won their fifth straight game against the Pirates and their ninth in the prior 11 games.
- **June 21** – In the finale of the series against the Pirates, the Cubs completed the second series sweep against the Pirates on the season, beating the Pirates 8–3. The loss was the Pirates ninth straight loss. Kyle Hendricks pitched 6.1 innings and allowed only one earned run in the win. Ian Happ doubled twice and drove in three runs while Nico Hoerner homered and tripled, driving in three in the win.
- **June 24** – After two days off to travel to London, the Cubs faced the Cardinals for two games in the London Series played at London Stadium. In game one of the series, Justin Steele pitched six innings and allowed only one run. Ian Happ homered twice while Dansby Swanson also homered as the Cubs won 9–1. The win moved the Cubs to one game under .500 at 37–38.
- **June 25** – In game two of the series, the Cubs took a 4–0 lead in the first. However, Marcus Stroman allowed six runs, three unearned, and left the game in the fourth with a blister on his finger. After scoring four in the first, the Cubs could only score one more as they lost 7–5.
- **June 27** – After an off day, the Cubs returned home to face the Phillies. Jameson Taillon allowed five runs in five innings while the Cubs managed only one run, losing 5–1.
- **June 28** – In game two of the series against the Phillies, Drew Smyly allowed seven runs in 3.2 innings. Dansby Swanson homered and Jared Young homered in his first appearance on the season, but it was not enough as the Cubs lost 8–5. The loss dropped the Cubs four games under .500 at 37–41.
- **June 29** – Kyle Hendricks pitched well, going seven innings and allowing only three runs, but the Cubs managed only one run as they were swept by the Phillies 3–1, their fourth straight loss.
- **June 30** – The Cubs next faced the Cleveland Guardians at Wrigley. Justin Steele pitched 6.1 scoreless innings as the Cubs won 10–1. Christopher Morel homered and drove in three runs while Nico Hoerner and Jared Young each drove in two runs in the win.

==== July ====
- **July 1** – Marcus Stroman allowed five runs in five innings and the Cubs were shutout by the Guardians 6–0.
- **July 2** – Jameson Taillon allowed six runs in five innings and the Cubs trailed 6–1 entering the eighth. A team-leading 15th home run of the year by Christopher Morel drew the Cubs to within four. In the ninth, still trailing by four, the Cubs scored four runs to tie the game. Morel drove in two more runs in the ninth while questionable defense by the Guardians helped send the game into extra innings. In the 10th, the Guardians scored two runs off Adbert Alzolay as the Cubs lost 8–6.
- **July 3** – The Cubs traveled to Milwaukee to face the Brewers for a four-game series. Nick Madrigal and Tucker Barnhart each drove in two runs as the Cubs took an early 6–2 lead. Drew Smyly allowed three runs in 3.2 innings of work, but the Cubs still led by three in the seventh before Julian Merryweather gave up three runs to tie it. Mark Leiter Jr. allowed two in the eighth as the Cubs blew the 6–0 lead and lost 8–6.
- **July 4** – In game two against the Brewers, the Cubs took an early 4–0 lead and led by four in the eighth before Mark Leiter Jr. again allowed two runs to pull the Brewers within two at 6–4. In the eighth, Adbert Alzolay surrendered two more runs to tie the game and send the game into extra innings. The Cubs failed to score a run in the 10th, but, in the bottom half of the inning, Ian Happ threw out a runner at home while Miguel Amaya threw out a runner at second for a double play to keep the game going. In the 11th, Nico Hoerner reached on an infield single to score the go-ahead run and Happ threw another runner out at home to end the game and give the Cubs the 7–6 win.
- **July 5** – In the third game of the series, the Cubs trailed the Brewers 3–1 in the ninth before Mike Tauchman doubled in two runs to tie the game in the top of the ninth. Tauchman then scored on a throwing error to give the Cubs a 4–3 lead. Adbert Alzolay pitched a perfect ninth to secure the win over the Brewers.
- **July 6** – In the finale of the series against the Brewers, Marcus Stroman allowed four runs in five innings of work, but the Cubs tied the game in the eighth on a Yan Gomes home run. However, Michael Fulmer gave up a homer in the bottom of the eight as the Cubs lost 6–5.
- **July 7** – The Cubs next traveled to face the Yankees. Jameson Taillon pitched eight scoreless innings while allowing only one hit against his former team. Cody Bellinger homered while Nico Hoerner and Patrick Wisdom drove in a run to give the Cubs the 3–0 win. The win marked the first-ever win by the Cubs in the Bronx.
- **July 8** – Drew Smyly allowed four runs in four innings while Michael Rucker allowed two in one inning of relief. Mike Tauchman hit a two-run homer in the eighth, but it was not enough as the Cubs lost to the Yankees 6–3.
- **July 9** – In the final game prior to the All-Star break, Kyle Hendricks allowed four runs in 5.2 innings and the Cubs trailed the Yankees 4–1 entering the seventh. However, the Cubs rallied to score six runs in the final three innings to come back for the 7–4 win over the Yankees.
- **July 12** – Three Cubs were selected to participate in the All-Star Game: Justin Steele, Marcus Stroman, and Dansby Swanson. Swanson did not play after being put on the injured list shortly before the All-Star break. Marcus Stroman did not pitch as he preferred to rest. Justin Steele did play and pitched one scoreless inning as the National League defeated the American League for the first time since 2012.
- **July 14** – In the first game of the second half, the Cubs faced the Boston Red Sox at Wrigley Field. Kyle Hendricks allowed five runs in 4.2 innings while the Cub bullpen surrendered three more. Cody Bellinger hit two home runs, but it was not enough as the Cubs lost 8–3.
- **July 15** – In game two of the series against the Red Sox, Cody Bellinger hit a grand slam while Patrick Wisdom hit a two-run homer. Marcus Stroman allowed one run in six innings as the Cubs beat the Sox 10–4.
- **July 16** – In the finale of the series against the Red Sox, Justin Steele allowed six runs, including a grand slam to Masataka Yoshida, as the Cubs were blown out 11–5.
- **July 17** – The Cubs next faced the Nationals at Wrigley. Drew Smyly allowed five runs in six innings while Patrick Wisdom and Ian Happ homered for the Cubs. However, it was not enough as the Cubs lost 7–5.
- **July 18** – Jameson Taillon allowed three runs in 5.2 innings as the Cubs fell behind 3–0. However, the Cub offense exploded for 17 runs, scoring 16 in the sixth, seventh, and eighth, to blow out the National 17–3. Patrick Wisdom and Seiya Suzuki homered for the Cubs as five different Cubs drove in more than one run in the win.
- **July 19** – In the finale of the series against the Nationals, the Cubs took a 3–1 lead into the eighth before the Nationals tied the game. In the bottom half of the eighth, Yan Gomes drove in the go-ahead run with a sacrifice fly and Nico Hoerner hit his first career grand slam as the Cubs won 8–3.
- **July 20** – The Cubs next faced the Cardinals at Wrigley. Marcus Stroman allowed five runs in 3.2 innings as the Cubs lost 7–2. Yan Gomes hit two triples in the loss.
- **July 21** – In game two against the Cardinals, Cody Bellinger hit a two-run homer while Miles Mastrobuoni hit his first homer of the season. Justin Steele allowed just two runs in 6.1 innings as the Cubs won 4–3.
- **July 22** – In the third game of the series, there were multiple rain delays. The Cubs trailed on three different occasions, but rallied to tie each time and took the lead in the sixth. Cody Bellinger drove in four runs in the game while Seiya Suzuki drove in two as the Cubs beat the Cardinals 8–6.
- **July 23** – In the finale of the four-game series against the Cardinals, Cody Bellinger hit a two-run homer and drove in another run on a sacrifice fly. The Cubs took an early 7–0 lead and held on for a 7–2 win. Yan Gomes drove in two runs in the win as the Cubs moved to within three games of .500 at 48–51 by winning their fifth game in the previous six.
- **July 25** – After an off day, the Cubs traveled across town to play the White Sox. Dansby Swanson homered twice while Christopher Morel and Nico Hoerner also homered to give the Cubs an early lead. With the Cubs leading 7–1 in the seventh, Seiya Suzuki stole a would-be grand slam that would have brought the White Sox within two. The Cubs held on to win their fourth straight game, beating the White Sox 7–3.
- **July 26** – In game two of the short series with the White Sox, Marcus Stroman allowed seven runs in 3.1 innings. Trailing 7–2 in the fifth, the Cubs scored six runs, helped by poor White Sox defense, to take an 8–7 lead. Ian Happ and Cody Bellinger hit back-to-back home runs in the eighth to push the lead to 10–7. Adbert Alzolay pitched a perfect ninth for his 11th save on the season to give the Cubs their fifth straight win. The win moved the Cubs to one game under .500 (50–51) with the trade deadline approaching.
- **July 27** – With a five-game win streak on the line, the Cubs faced the Cardinals in St. Louis. After Cardinals' pitcher Miles Mikolas was thrown out of the game in the first inning for intentionally hitting Ian Happ, the Cubs blew out the Cardinals 10–3. Yan Gomes drove in three runs while Mike Tauchman homered and drove in two runs in the win. The win moved the Cubs to .500 on the season (51–51).
- **July 28** – In game two against the Cardinals, Hayden Wesnescki and Drew Smyly combined to allow two runs in 6.1 innings. Patrick Wisdom homered while Trey Mancini and Dansby Swanson each drove in a run for the Cubs. Leading 3–2 in the bottom of the ninth with runners on first and second, Adbert Alzolay induced a double play that left a runner on third with two outs. Mike Tauchman stole a home run off the bat of Alec Burleson to give the Cubs the 3–2 win.
- **July 29** – Jameson Taillon allowed only one run in six innings while the bullpen shut out the Cardinals. Yan Gomes and Ian Happ each hit two-run homers as the Cubs beat the Cardinals 5–1. The win moved the Cubs two games over .500 (53–51) for the first time since May 2.
- **July 30** – In the finale of the four-game series against the Cardinals, Kyle Hendricks allowed three runs in seven innings, but the Cub offense failed to score. The 3–0 loss ended the Cubs eight-game winning streak.
- **July 31** – Returning home to Wrigley to face the first-place Reds, Marcus Stroman was rocked, allowing six runs in three innings. Three Cub pitchers combined to shut out the Reds the rest of the way. However, the deficit was too large to overcome as the Cubs lost 6–5. Dansby Swanson homered in the loss that dropped the Cubs back to .500 on the season.

==== August ====
- **August 1** – Dansby Swanson homered twice and drove in five runs as the Cubs tied a modern team record by hitting seven home runs in the game. Mike Tauchman also homered and drove in four runs as the Cubs blew out the Reds 20–9. Newly acquired Jeimer Candelario played first and had four hits in the game. Patrick Wisdom, Nico Hoerner, Miguel Amaya, and Cody Bellinger also homered for the Cubs in the easy win.
- **August 2** – The Cubs fell behind 3–0 and 5–2 before storming back to blow out the Reds for the second consecutive day. Ian Happ hit two home runs while Dansby Swanson, Seiya Suzuki, and Christopher Morel also homered for the Cubs. With the 16–6 win, the Cubs scored 36 runs in a back-to-back games, the most runs they had scored in a two-game span since 1897. Jeimer Candelario, in his second game since being acquired, had four hits, giving him eight hits for the Cubs on the season. The win moved the Cubs back to two games over .500 and only three games behind the Reds for the division lead.
- **August 3** – In the finale of the series against the Reds, Jameson Taillon allowed two runs in five-plus innings of work and left with a 4–2 lead. The Cubs scored two of their five runs on bases-loaded walks while Ian Happ, Cody Bellinger, and Nico Hoerner each drove in a run with a hit. Adbert Alzolay got four outs to secure the 5–3 win. The win moved the Cubs three games over .500 (56–53). The win also moved the Cubs to 2.5 games behind the Brewers for the division lead while knocking the Reds out of first place.
- **August 4** – The Atlanta Braves next came to Wrigley with the best record in baseball. Kyle Hendricks gave up seven runs in four innings as the Cubs were shut out 8–0.
- **August 5** – In game two against the Braves, the Cubs jumped out to an early 5–0 lead in the first inning on homers from Dansby Swanson and Jeimer Candelario. Candelario and Cody Bellinger each had two hits in the game as the Cubs held on to win 8–6.
- **August 6** – In the finale of the three-game series against the Braves, the Cubs fell behind twice, but rallied and took a 5–3 lead in the fifth. Justin Steele allowed four runs in 5.1 innings, but the Cub bullpen shut out the Braves the rest of the way as the Cubs won 6–4. Dansby Swanson and Ian Happ each drove in two runs in the win. The win moved the Cubs four games over .500 (58–54) on the season and 1.5 games behind the Brewers for the division.
- **August 7** – Travelling to New York to face the Mets, Drew Smyly allowed seven runs in five innings including two home runs by Pete Alonso. The Cubs only managed two runs in a game that included a more than two hour rain delay, losing 11–2.
- **August 8** – In game two against the Mets, Jameson Taillon allowed a first inning home run to Pete Alonso that gave the Mets a 2–0 lead. A home run by Cody Bellinger in the fourth and an RBI double by Yan Gomes in the fifth tied the game. Taillon retired the final 16 batters he faced as he went seven innings. In the eighth, Mike Tauchman homered to give the Cubs a 3–2 lead. Julian Merryweather and Adbert Alzolay shut out the Mets for the final two innings to seal the 3–2 win. The win moved the Cubs back within 1.5 games of the Brewers for the division lead.
- **August 9** – In the finale of the series against the Mets, the Cubs took an early 2–0 lead on a Christopher Morel homer on the first pitch of the game and a passed ball that scored Seiya Suzuki after he had tripled. Kyle Hendricks allowed a two-run homer to Pete Alonos and left the game after five with the scored tied at two. Heyden Wesnescki failed to get an out in the sixth and gave up the lead as the Cubs lost 4–3.
- **August 11** – After an off day, the Cubs traveled to Toronto to face the Blue Jays. Javier Assad, pitching in Drew Smyly's rotation spot, pitched a career-high seven innings and allowed only one run. Homers by Nico Hoerner and Cody Bellinger in the first gave the Cubs the early 3–0 lead. A double by Seiya Suzuki and a run-scoring single by Mike Tauchman pushed the lead to 6–0 in the fourth. The Cubs held on for the 6–2 win and moved four games over .500 again.
- **August 12** – In game two of the series against the Blue Jays, Cody Bellinger drove in a run in the fourth and Dansby Swanson hit a three-run homer to give the Cubs a 4–1 lead. Justin Steele allowed three runs in five innings and the Blue Jays tied it in the sixth off of Michael Fulmer. However, Christopher Morel doubled in Bellinger in the top of the ninth and Adbert Alzolay pitched a perfect ninth to secure the 5–4 win. The win moved the Cubs five games over .500 (61–56) and left them 2.5 games out of first in the division.
- **August 13** – In the finale of the series against the Blue Jays, Jameson Taillon allowed eight runs in three innings as the Cubs were blown out 11–4.
- **August 15** – After an off day, the Cubs returned home for a two-game series against the White Sox. Kyle Hendricks allowed three runs in six innings, but left with the game tied at three. However, Julian Merryweather allowed a home run to Luis Robert Jr. in the seventh and Adbert Alzolay allowed a run in the ninth as the Cubs lost 5–3. Ian Happ and Seiya Suzuki homered in the loss. The Cubs remained 3.5 games out of first with the loss.
- **August 16** – Javier Assad again pitched well, allowing only two earned runs in six innings, but left with the Cubs trailing the White Sox 3–0. Nick Madrigal hit a pinch-hit homer in the eighth to draw within 3–1. In the bottom of the ninth, Cody Belligner doubled and Dansby Swanson walked before Christopher Morel hit a three-run home run for the walk-off 4–3 win. The win moved the Cubs 2.5 games behind the Brewers for first in the division.
- **August 18** – After another off day, the Cubs faced the Kansas City Royals at Wrigley. Jameson Taillon allowed four runs, only two earned in six innings, but the Cubs only managed three runs against the last-place Royals and lost 4–3. The loss dropped the Cubs to 62–59 on the season.
- **August 19** – In game two of the series, the Cubs jumped out to a 6–2 lead as Cody Bellinger homered twice and drove in four runs. Justin Steele allowed two runs in six innings as the Cubs held on for the 6–4 win over the Royals.
- **August 20** – Kyle Hendricks allowed one run in 6.1 innings as the Cubs took a 4–1 lead to the ninth. Adbert Alzolay allowed two runs in the ninth, but got the final out with the tying run on second to secure the 4–3 win against the Royals. Seiya Suzuki and Miguel Amaya homered for the Cubs while Cody Bellinger and Ian Happ each drove in a run. The win kept the Cubs three games behind the Brewers in the division.
- **August 21** – The Cubs next traveled to Detroit to face the Tigers. Javier Assad allowed two runs in 5.1 innings and left with a 4–2 lead. The Tigers tied it in the eighth on a double by former Cubs Javier Báez and a single by Zach McKinstry, also a former Cub. A double by Nick Madrigal and a groundout by Ian Happ gave the Cubs the 7–5 lead in the ninth. Mark Leiter Jr. allowed one run in the bottom of the ninth, but with the tying run on first, got the flyout to give the Cubs the 7–6 win. The win moved the Cubs six games over .500 (65–59) and into the second wild card spot in the National League.
- **August 22** – In game two against the Tigers, Drew Smyly returned to the rotation and allowed seven runs in 3.2 innings. Dansby Swanson homered and drove in two runs for the Cubs while Jeimer Candelario also homered and drove in two. But, it was not enough as the Cubs lost 8–6.
- **August 23** – In the series finale against the Tigers, Jameson Taillon did not allow a hit until the sixth when he allowed three straight singles to lead off the inning. After getting two outs with the bases loaded, he surrendered a grand slam to Kerry Carpenter to tie the game at four. Yan Gomes drove in the go-ahead run with a single in the eighth and Nico Hoerner drove in an insurance run in the ninth. Adbert Alzolay pitched a scoreless inning to get the save as the Cubs won 6–4. Cody Bellinger drove in two runs in the win as the Cubs stayed within 3.5 games of the Brewers in the division and moved into a tie with the Reds for the second wild card spot.
- **August 24** – The Cubs jumped out to an early 3–0 lead against the Pirates in Pittsburgh. However, Justin Steele surrendered a game-tying home run to Josh Palacios in the third. The game remained tied into extra innings. In the 10th, Ian Happ hit a bloop single that scored Nico Hoerner. An error on the play by Pirate outfielder Connor Joe also allowed Dansby Swanson to score on the play. Adbert Alzolay allowed the Manfred runner to score in the bottom of the 10th, but got the save as the Cubs won 5–4. The win moved the Cubs a season-high seven games over .500 (67–60) and three games behind the Brewers.
- **August 25** – In game two against the Pirates, Kyle Hendricks allowed only two runs in 5.2 innings of work. However, the Cub offense was stymied by Pirate pitcher Mitch Keller who pitched eight scoreless innings. Ian Happ homered in the ninth, but it was not enough as the Cubs lost 2–1. The loss dropped the Cubs four games behind the Brewers in the division.
- **August 26** – Jordan Wicks made his major league debut and allowed a home run to the first batter he faced. After allowing another hit and a walk, Wicks retired the next 15 Pirates he faced. The Cubs scored three in the third and five in the fifth to take a 8–1 lead. Hayden Wesneski allowed five runs in less than two innings of relief as the Pirates drew closer, but a two-run scoring double by Seiya Suzuki extend the Cub lead to 10–6 and they held for the win. Suzuki and Ian Happ each drove in three runs in the win.
- **August 27** – In the finale of the series against the Pirates, Javier Assad again pitched well, allowing only one run in seven innings. Cody Bellinger had three hits and drove in five runs while Jeimer Candelario homered and drove in three in the 10–1 win. The win moved the Cubs a season-high eight games over .500 (69–61), but they remained four games behind the Brewers.
- **August 28** – The Cubs returned home to face the division-leading Brewers. Jameson Taillon allowed four runs in the first inning and five overall as the Cubs fell behind 5–1. The Cub offense only managed another run as they lost 6–2. The loss dropped the Cubs five games behind the Brewers in the division.
- **August 29** – In game two against the Brewers, Justin Steele held the Brewers scoreless for six innings while Mark Leiter Jr., Julian Merryweather, and Adbert Alzolay pitched three scoreless innings of relief. The Cubs scored one run in the first on an RBI-groundout by Cody Bellinger for the only scoring in the game. The 1–0 win moved the Cubs back to within four games of the Brewers for the division lead and gave the Cubs a one-game lead over the Giants for the second wild card spot.
- **August 30** – In the finale against the Brewers, the Cubs took a 2–0 lead in the first on an Ian Happ double and a Dansby Swanson sacrifice fly. Kyle Hendricks allowed one run in the third and left with a 2–1 lead after six innings. In the eighth, Mark Leiter Jr. gave up a single and walked two to load the bases with two outs. Adbert Alzolay came in to try for the four-out save, but hit the first batter he faced to force in the tying run. In the bottom of the eighth, Cody Bellinger lined a ball off the pitcher and reached on an infield single to score the go-ahead run. Alzolay pitched a scoreless ninth to seal the win. The win moved the Cubs a season-high nine games over .500 (71–62) and within three games of the Brewers for the division lead.

==== September ====
- **September 1** – After an off day, the Cubs returned to the road to face the Reds. In game one of a doubleheader, Jordan Wicks again pitched well, allowing only one run in five innings. Cody Bellinger homered and drove in three while Ian Happ hit a two-run homer as the Cubs won 6–2. The win moved the Cubs to a season-high 10 games over .500. In game two of the doubleheader, Bellinger homered again while Happ drove in another run and the Cubs went to the ninth with a 2–1 lead. However, Adbert Alzolay allowed three hits and two runs in the bottom of the ninth to give the Reds the 3–2 win.
- **September 2** – In game three of the series, Javier Assad pitched eight scoreless innings and left with a 1–0 lead on a Jeimer Candelario home run. However, Mark Leiter Jr. and Jose Cuas couldn't close the game in the ninth as the Reds rallied to win 2–1.
- **September 3** – In the finale of the series against the Reds, Jameson Taillon allowed five runs in 5.2 innings. Cody Bellinger homered again and drove in three runs, but the Cubs entered the eight tied at five. In the eighth, the Cubs scored eight runs to blow the game open and won easily 15–7. Ian Happ drove in four runs in the win while Jeimer Candelario homered for the second straight game. The win moved the Cubs back to nine games over .500 on the season (73–64).
- **September 4** – On Labor Day, the Cubs returned home to face the Giants. Justin Steele pitched eight innings while allowing only two hits and no runs. Seiya Suzuki homered and drove in three as the Cubs got the 5–0 win. The win moved the Cubs back to 10 games over .500 and within 2.5 games of the Brewers for the division lead.
- **September 5** – In game two against the Giants, Kyle Hendricks allowed four earned runs and left the game with tied at four. After the Giants retook the lead, the Cub offense again came alive in the seventh as they scored six runs to take control of the game. Seiya Suzuki hit a two-run home run to tie the game and Christopher Morel added a three-run homer in the inning to give the Cubs a 10–6 lead. Yan Gomes had three RBI in the game as the Cubs won their third in a row, beating the Giants 11–8. The win moved the Cubs to a season-high 11 games over .500 on the season (75–64) and put them ahead by three games for the second wild card spot.
- **September 6** – Jordan Wicks pitched well again, giving up just two runs in 6.2 innings. Seiya Suzuki drove in three with a bases-clearing double in the first while Cody Bellinger and Miguel Amaya each homered for the Cubs. The Cubs beat the Giants easily 8–2, marking their fourth straight win. A loss by the Brewers moved the Cubs to within 1.5 games of the division lead.
- **September 7** – The Arizona Diamondbacks next came to Wrigley for a four-game series. Entering the series, the Diamondbacks trailed the Cubs by four games for the second wild card spot. Javier Assad allowed three runs and the Cub bullpen also surrendered three as the Cubs lost 6–2. The loss dropped the Cubs two games behind the Brewers for first place in the division.
- **September 8** – In game two of the series against the Diamondbacks, Jamison Taillon pitched six scoreless innings and Cub bullpen allowed only run. However, Arizona pitcher Zac Gallen pitched a complete game shutout as the Cubs lost 1–0.
- **September 9** – In the third game of the series, Justin Steele allowed one run, but again the Cub offense struggled, also only scoring one run. The game went into extra innings where a wild pitch and a groundout gave the Diamondbacks a 3–1 lead. Cody Bellinger drove in his second run of the game in the bottom of the 10th, but the Cubs could manage no more, losing 3–2. The loss dropped the Cub lead over Arizona in the wild card to only one game.
- **September 10** – Looking to avoid the sweep, Christopher Morel, Cody Bellinger, and Dansby Swanson each hit solo home runs in the third as the Cubs won 5–2. Swanson had two RBIs in the game as the Cubs moved three games behind the Brewers in the division and two games ahead of the Diamondbacks in the wild card.
- **September 11** – The Cubs traveled to Denver to face the Rockies. Jordan Wicks continued to pitch well, pitching six innings and allowing only one run. The Cubs led 3–1 going into the seventh on RBI singles by Nick Madrigal and Yan Gomes and a towering homer by Christopher Morel. However, Jose Cuas allowed three runs in the seventh to give the Rockies a 4–3 lead. Yan Gomes drove in two in the top of the ninth with a single while Michael Fulmer allowed the winning run on first, but struck out the final two batters for the save. Cubs' top prospect Pete Crow-Armstrong made his MLB debut pinch-running in the seventh and was thrown out trying to steal third. He hit a sacrifice bunt in the ninth in his first plate appearance.
- **September 12** – In game two against the Rockies, former Cub Kris Bryant homered and drove in three runs. Javier Assad did not pitch well, allowing four runs in 3.1 innings. However, the Cubs tied it in the sixth at four as Seiya Suzuki homered and drove in three runs in the game. But, reliever Daniel Palencia allowed two runs in two innings of relief as the Cubs lost 6–4.
- **September 13** – In the finale of the series against the Rockies, Kris Bryant homered again against his former team. Jameson Taillon allowed five runs, three earned, in five innings as the Cubs lost 7–3. The lost kept the Cubs four games behind the Brewers in the division and reduced their lead for the second wild card spot to two games.
- **September 15** – After a scheduled off day, the Cubs faced the Diamondbacks in Arizona. Justin Steele allowed six runs in six innings and the Cub offense was held scoreless until the ninth. In the ninth, Ian Happ, Seiya Suzuki, and Christopher Morel homered to draw the Cubs within 6–4. But it was not enough as the Cubs lost their third in a row.
- **September 16** – In game two against the D-Backs, Kyle Hendricks allows three runs in 5.1 innings and game went to extra innings tied at three. Each team scored one run in the 10th and 11th, but neither team scored in the 12th, pushing the game to the 13th. With the game tied at six, Hayden Wesneski allows a run-scoring single to give the Diamondbacks the 7–6 win.
- **September 17** – In the finale of the series in Arizona, Jordan Wicks allowed three runs in 4.1 innings of work and the Cub bullpen surrendered three more as the Cubs were swept by the Diamondbacks 6–2. The loss marked the Cubs' fifth straight loss and put them in a tie for the last wild card spot with only 12 games remaining as the Diamondbacks moved ahead of them in the wild card race.
- **September 19** – After another scheduled off day, the Cubs returned home to begin the final homestand of the season against the Pirates. The Cub offense exploded for 14 runs and a 90-minute rain delay. Cody Bellinger, Dansby Swanson, and Seiya Suzuki all homered for the Cubs. Alexander Canario hit his first career home run, a grand slam, as part of an eight-run eighth inning as the Cubs won 14–1. The win moved the Cubs into a half game lead for the final wild card spot.
- **September 20** – In game two against the Pirates, the Cubs took an early 1–0 lead. But, Justin Steele surrendered six runs in the sixth while the Cub bullpen imploded, allowing seven more runs. The Cubs brought the score to within two in the fifth as Ian Happ hit a grand slam, but the Pirates put the game away winning 13–7. Despite the loss, the Cubs' sixth loss in the prior seven games, they remained a half-game ahead for the last wild card spot.
- **September 21** – In the finale of the series against the Pirates, the Cubs fell behind 5–1 as Kyle Hendricks allowed three runs in six innings and Brad Boxberger allowed two in the top of the eighth. The Cubs narrowed the lead to 5–4 in the eighth, but Julian Merryweather allowed three runs while getting only one out in the ninth. A Dansby Swanson two-run homer in the bottom of the ninth narrowed the lead to 8–6, but the Cubs could pull no closer. The 8–6 loss dropped the Cubs into a tie with the Marlins for the final wild card spot.
- **September 22** – In the final home series of the season, the Rockies visited Wrigley Field with the Cubs needing wins to stay in the playoff race. Jameson Taillon pitched six scoreless innings and the Cub bullpen held the Rockies scoreless. Seiya Suzuki and Jared Young each hit two-run homers as the Cubs won 6–0. A loss by the Marlins later in the day gave the Cubs lead for the final wild card spot by one game.
- **September 23** – In a surprising move, Marcus Stroman, who had not started a game since July 31 due to injury, got the start for the Cubs. He pitched three innings and allowed three runs. Javier Assad who had assumed Stroman's role in the starting rotation, pitched four scoreless innings in relief. Nico Hoerner drove in two runs in the game and Christopher Morel as the Cubs rallied from a 3–1 deficit to win 6–3. The win kept them one game ahead of the Marlins for the last wild card spot and drew them within a half game of the Diamondbacks for the second wild card spot.
- **September 24** – In the final game of the regular season at Wrigley, Jordan Wicks allowed three runs in six innings while Patrick Wisdom hit a two-run homer to give the Cubs the 4–3 win. Yan Gomes also had two RBI in the game as the Cubs maintained their one-game lead for the last wild card spot.
- **September 25** – With six games left in the regular season, the Cubs went to Atlanta to face a Braves team that had all but wrapped up the top seed in the NL playoffs. Justin Steele held the Braves scoreless for five innings as the Cubs jumped out to a 6–0 lead behind Seiya Suzuki's triple that scored two runs. However, in the sixth, Steele surrendered three runs to cut the lead in half. Javier Assad allowed two runs in the seventh, but the Cubs still led 6–5 in the eighth. With two outs and two runners on, Matt Olson hit a fly ball to right center field that should have been caught, but Suzuki whiffed on the catch allowing two runs to score. Now trailing in the ninth, the Cubs put a runner on with a single by Cody Bellinger, but could muster no more as they lost 7–6. The loss put the Cubs only half a game ahead for the last wild card position. The loss officially gave the Brewers the division.
- **September 27** – In game two of the series against the Braves, Jameson Taillon allowed two runs in six-plus innings of work. He left with a 3–2 lead in the seventh behind homers by Mike Tauchman and Ian Happ. However, Julian Merryweather allowed the tying run to score in the eighth before Yan Gomes drove in the go-ahead run in the top of the ninth. Mark Leiter Jr. then allowed a homer to Marcell Ozuna in the bottom of the ninth to force extra innings. In the 10th, the Cubs went ahead 5–4 on a Happ sacrifice fly. However, Ronald Acuña Jr. singled in the tying run in the bottom of the 10th, then stole second, and scored the winning the run on a single by Ozzie Albies as the Cubs lost 6–5. The loss dropped the Cubs into a tie with the Marlins for the last wild card spot.
- **September 28** – Looking to avoid a sweep and to keep in the wild card chase, Marcus Stroman allowed four runs, two earned, in two innings. The Cubs fell behind 5–0 after three, but rallied to narrow the score to 5–3 in the eighth. However, they could not get any closer and lost to the Braves 5–3. Due to the Marlins game being suspended becauss of rain, the Cubs fell only half a game behind the Marlins for the final playoff spot.
- **September 29** – With the Cubs' playoff chances dwindling, they travelled to play the Brewers for the final series of the season. Kyle Hendricks allowed three runs in the fifth and the Cubs trailed 3–0 entering the eighth. In the eighth, Jeimer Candelario homered and Yan Gomes drove in a run to narrow the lead to one. Ian Happ homered in the ninth to tied the game and push it to extra innings. In the 10th, the Cubs could not score and on the third pitch of the bottom of the tenth, Jose Cuas allowed the game-winning hit as the Cubs lost their fourth straight game. The loss moved the Cubs to the brink of playoff elimination.
- **September 30** – Yan Gomes hit a grand slam as the Cubs jumped out to a 6–0 lead in the first inning. The Brewers quickly tied it, scoring three in the first and three in the second of off Jordan Wicks. However, RBI hits by Ian Happ, Cody Bellinger, and Alexander Canario gave the Cubs the 9–6 lead. A Gomes grounder in the sixth pushed the lead to four, but with a Marlins win, the Cubs were eliminated from playoff contention. The Cubs won the game 10–6, their 83rd win of the season.

==== October ====
- **October 1** – On the final day of the season and having been eliminated from the playoffs, the Cubs sat most of their starters and were shut out by the Brewers 4–0. They finished the season 83–79.

=== Transactions ===
==== March ====
March 30	Placed RHP Kyle Hendricks and LHP Brandon Hughes on 15-day injured list. Placed OF Seiya Suzuki on 10-day injured list. Selected the contract of RHP Mark Leiter Jr. from Iowa.

==== April ====
April 10	Optioned RHP Javier Assad to Iowa. Recalled OF Nelson Velázquez from Iowa.
April 14	Optioned IF Miles Mastrobuoni to Iowa. Activated OF Seiya Suzuki.
April 15	Optioned OF Nelson Velázquez to Iowa. Activated LHP Brandon Hughes.
April 20	Placed RHP Jameson Taillon on the 15-day IL. Recalled RHP Javier Assad from Iowa.
April 21	Optioned RHP Javier Assad to Iowa. Recalled RHP Jeremiah Estrada from Iowa.
April 25	Placed OF Cody Bellinger on the paternity list. Recalled OF Nelson Velásquez from Iowa.
April 28	Activated OF Cody Bellinger from paternity list. Designated C Luis Torrens for assignment.
April 29	Recalled RHP Caleb Kilian from Iowa. Placed LHP Brandon Hughes on 15-day IL retroactive to April 27.
April 30	Optioned RHP Caleb Kilian to Iowa. Selected the contract of LHP Ryan Borucki from Iowa. Activated LHP Ryan Borucki.

==== May ====
May 1	Signed free agent RHP Nestor Pirela to a minor league contract.
May 2	Recalled C Miguel Amaya from Tennessee Smokies. Designated LHP Ryan Borucki for assignment.
May 3	Placed C Yan Gomes on the 7-day IL. Traded C Luis Torrens to Baltimore Orioles for cash. Recalled RHP Javier Assad from Iowa.
May 4	Activated RHP Jameson Taillon. Optioned RHP Jeremiah Estrada to Iowa.
May 5	Selected the contract of IB Matt Mervis from Iowa. Optioned IF Edwin Rios to Iowa.
May 8	Recalled IF Christopher Morel from Iowa. Optioned OF Nelson Velásquez to Iowa.
May 10	Activated C Yan Gomes. Optioned C Miguel Amaya to Iowa.
May 12	Placed IF Nico Hoerner on 10-day IL retroactive to May 9. Activated LHP Brandon Hughes from 15-day IL. Optioned RHP Javier Assad to Iowa. Recalled IF Miles Mastrobuoni from Iowa.
May 15	Activated LHP Brandon Hughes. Optioned RHP Hayden Wesneski to Iowa. Recalled RHP Jeremiah Estrada from Iowa. Placed RHP Brad Boxberger on the 15-day IL. Selected the contract of RHP Nick Burdi from Iowa. Transferred RHP Adrian Sampson to the 60-day IL.
May 19	Placed OF Cody Bellinger on the 10-day IL. Activated IF Nico Hoerner. Designated IF Eric Hosmer for assignment. Optioned RHP Keegan Thompson to Iowa. Selected the contract of OF Mike Tauchman from Iowa. Recalled IF Edwin Rios from Iowa.
May 24	Placed RHP Nick Burdi on the 15-day IL retroactive to May 21. Recalled RHP Javier Assad.
May 25	Activated RHP Kyle Hendricks. Optioned IF Nick Madrigal to Iowa. Released IF Eric Hosmer.
May 30	Optioned RHP Michael Rucker to Iowa. Recalled RHP Hayden Wesneski from Iowa.

==== June ====
June 2	Traded RHP Vinny Nittoli to New York Mets for future considerations.
June 3	Recalled C Miguel Amaya from Iowa. Placed LHP Justin Steele on injured list. Signed free agents OF Francis Reynoso and RHP Jeral Vizcaino to minor league contracts.
June 4	Signed free agent OF Welington Santana to a minor league contract.
June 7	Placed IF Edwin Rios and on 10-day IL retroactive to June 4. Recalled RHP Michael Rucker from Iowa.
June 9	Recalled IF Nick Madrigal from Iowa. Optioned IF Miles Mastrobuoni to Iowa.
June 12	Signed free agent LHP Anthony Kay to a minor league contract.
June 13	Recalled IF Miles Mastrobuoni from Iowa. Optioned RHP Jeremiah Estrada to Iowa. Selected the contract of LHP Anthony Kay from Iowa. Placed LHP Brandon Hughes on the 15-day IL retroactive to June 12. Transferred RHP Nick Burdi to 60-day IL.
June 15	Activated OF Cody Bellinger. Optioned IF Matt Mervis to Iowa.
June 17	Activated LHP Justin Steele. Placed IF Patrick Wisdom on 10-day IL. Optioned IF Edwin Rios to Iowa.
June 24	Recalled If Edwin Rios from Iowa
June 26	Optioned IF Edwin Rios to Iowa.
June 27	Selected the contract of IF Jared Young from Iowa. Optioned OF Miles Mastrobuoni to Iowa. Transferred LHP Brandon Hues to the 60-day IL.
June 28	Signed free agent C Vincent Nunez to a minor league contract.
June 29	Signed free agent RHP Dalbert Mosquea to a minor league contract.

==== July ====
July 4	Selected the contract of RHP Daniel Palencia from Iowa. Activated IF Patrick Wisdom from 10-day IL. Optioned RHP Hayden Wesneski to Iowa. Placed IF Nick Madrigal on 10-day IL. Transferred RHP Brad Boxberger to 60-day IL.
July 8	Placed IF Dansby Swanson on 10-day IL. Recalled If Miles Mastrobuoni from Iowa.
July 15	Acquired C P. J. Higgins from Arizona Diamondbacks for cash.
July 19	Signed SS Josh Rivera, 3B Drew Bowser, LHP Ethan Flanagan, RHP Will Sanders, 2B Carter Trice, LHP Daniel Brown, RHP Ty Johnson, RHP Nick Dean, RHP Grayson Moore, SS Yahil Melendez, 1B Jonathon Long, OF Alfonsin Rosario, 3B Brian Kalmer, RHP Luis Martinez-Gomez, OF Brett Bateman, SS Matt Shaw, C Michael Carico.
July 21	Signed free agent RHPs Kenten Egbert and Landon Ginn to a minor league contract.
July 22	Activated SS Dansby Swanson from IL. Optioned IF Jared Young to Iowa.
July 24	Optioned RHP Adrian Sampson outright to Iowa. Signed free agent RHP Brayan Diaz to a minor league contract.
July 25	Signed OF Zyhir Hope, RHPs Sam Armstrong and Jaxon Wiggins.
July 28	Recalled RHP Hauden Wesneski from Iowa. Optioned RHP Michael Rucker to Iowa.
July 29	Activated IF Nick Madrigal from IL. Optioned IF Miles Mastrobuoni to Iowa.
July 30	Sent If Edwin Rios outright to Iowa.
July 31	Traded LHP DJ Herz and SS Kevin Made to Washington Nationals for IF Jeimer Candelario and cash. Traded OF Nelson Velazquez to Kansas City Royals for RHP José Cuas.

==== August ====
August 1	Activated IF Jeimer Candelario. Designated IF Trey Mancini for assignment. Traded RHPs Manuel Rodriguez, Adrian Sampson, and future considerations to Tampa Bay Rays for RHP Josh Roberson and international signing bonus pool space.
August 2	Released IF Trey Mancini. Placed RHP Marcus Stroman on 15-day IL. Activated RHP Jose Cuas.
August 6	Optioned LHP Anthony Kay to Iowa. Recalled RHP Caleb Kilian from Iowa.
August 15	Recalled RHP Michael Rucker from Iowa. Optioned RHP Caleb Kilian to Iowa.
August 17	Signed free agent LHP Richard Bleier to a minor league contract.
August 18	Claimed RHP Edwin Uceta off waivers from New York Mets.
August 19	Designated C Tucker Barnhart for assignment. Recall IF Miles Mastrobuoni from Iowa.
August 20	Released C Tucker Barnhart.
August 24	Recalled RHP Keegan Thompson from Iowa. Optioned RHP Michael Rucker to Iowa.
August 25	Sent RHP Edwin Uceta outright to Iowa.
August 26	Selected the contract of LHP Jordan Wicks from Iowa. Placed RHP Michael Fulmer on the 15-day IL retroactive to August 25.
August 29	Placed RHP Jose Cuas on bereavement list. Recalled LHP Anthony Kay from Iowa.

==== September ====
September 1	Selected the contract of RHP Shane Greene from Iowa. Optioned LHP Anthony Kay to Iowa. Recalled OF Alexander Canario from Iowa. Activated RHP Jose Cuas from bereavement list.
September 6	Designated RHP Shane Greene for assignment. Selected the contract of LHP Luke Little from Iowa.
September 8	Activated RHP Brad Boxberger from 60-day IL. Optioned RHP Keeghan Thompson to Iowa.
September 11	Placed RHP Adbert Alzolay on 15-day IL. Activated RHP Michael Fulmer from IL. Selected the contract of OF Pete Crow-Armstrong. Optioned OF Alexander Canario to Iowa. Designated LHP Anthony Kay for assignment.
September 12	Placed IF Jeimer Candelario on 10-day IL. Recalled OF Alexander Canario from Iowa.
September 15	Activated RHP Marcus Stroman from 15-day IL. Optioned RHP Daniel Palencia to Iowa.
September 16	Placed RHP Michael Fulmer on 15-day IL. Recalled RHP Daniel Palencia from Iowa.
September 19	Placed IF Nick Madrigal on 10-day IL retroactive to September 17. Recalled IF Jared Young from Iowa.
September 23	Placed RHP Brad Boxberger on 15-day IL retroactive to September 22. Recalled RHP Keegan Thompson from Iowa.
September 27	Activated IF Jeimer Candelario from 10-day IL. Optioned IF Jared Young to the Arizona Complex League Cubs.
September 29	Activated RHP Adbert Alzolay from 10-day IL. Optioned RHP Keegan Thompson to ACL Cubs.

==== October ====
October 1	Transferred RHP Michael Fulmer and IF Nick Madrigal to the 60-day IL. Placed IF Nico Hoerner on 10-day IL retroactive to September 30. Optioned LHP Jordan Wicks to ACL Cubs. Optioned RHP Hayden Wesnescki to ACL Cubs. Recalled IF Jared Young from ACL Cubs. Selected the contract of RHPs Tyler Duffey and Shane Greene from Iowa.

== Roster ==
2023 Chicago Cubs
Roster
Pitchers: 73 Adbert Alzolay; 72 Javier Assad; 25 Brad Boxberger; 49 Nick Burdi; 74 José Cuas; 65 Tyler Duffey; 56 Jeremiah Estrada; 32 Michael Fulmer; 18,51 Shane Greene; 28 Kyle Hendricks; 47 Brandon Hughes; 46 Anthony Kay; 45 Caleb Kilian; 38 Mark Leiter Jr.; 43 Luke Little; 66 Julian Merryweather; 48 Daniel Palencia; 59 Michael Rucker; 11 Drew Smyly; 35 Justin Steele; 0 Marcus Stroman; 50 Jameson Taillon; 71 Keegan Thompson; 19 Hayden Wesneski; 36 Jordan Wicks	Catchers: 6 Miguel Amaya; 18 Tucker Barnhart; 15 Yan Gomes; 22 Luis Torrens; Infielders: 9 Jeimer Candelario; 2 Nico Hoerner; 51 Eric Hosmer; 1 Nick Madrigal; 36 Trey Mancini; 20 Miles Mastrobuoni; 22 Matt Mervis; 30 Edwin Ríos; 7 Dansby Swanson; 16 Patrick Wisdom; 18,74 Jared Young	Outfielders: 24 Cody Bellinger; 4 Alexander Canario; 52 Pete Crow-Armstrong; 8 Ian Happ; 5 Christopher Morel; 27 Seiya Suzuki; 40 Mike Tauchman; 4 Nelson Velázquez	Manager: 3 David Ross; Coaches: 96 Jim Adduci (assistant hitting); 63 Juan Cabreja (assistant hitting); 81 Craig Driver (game strategy/catching); 29 Andy Green (bench); 33 Willie Harris (third base); 68 Tommy Hottovy (pitching); -- Danny Hultzen (pitching strategist); 76 Dustin Kelly (hitting); 85 Garrett Lloyd (bullpen catcher); 53 Daniel Moskos (assistant pitching); 90 Jonathan Mota (major league coach); 55 Mike Napoli (first base); 97 Alex Smith (data development and process); 82 Johnny Washington (assistant hitting); 54 Chris Young (bullpen)

== Statistics ==
Team leaders in each category are in bold.

=== Batting ===
(final statistics)
Note: G = Games played; AB = At bats; R = Runs; H = Hits; 2B = Doubles; 3B = Triples; HR = Home runs; RBI = Runs batted in; SB = Stolen bases; BB = Walks; K = Strikeouts; AVG = Batting average; OBP = On-base percentage; SLG = Slugging percentage; TB = Total bases

Player	G	AB	R	H	2B	3B	HR	RBI	SB	BB	K	AVG	OBP	SLG	TB
Miguel Amaya	53	131	17	28	4	0	5	18	0	12	40	.214	.329	.359	47
Tucker Barnhart	44	109	6	22	3	0	1	9	1	12	2	.202	.285	.257	28
Cody Bellinger	130	499	95	153	29	1	**26**	**97**	20	40	87	**.307**	.356	**.525**	**262**
Alexander Canario	6	17	1	5	1	1	1	6	0	0	8	.294	.294	.647	11
Jeimer Candelario	41	137	20	32	9	1	6	17	2	17	39	.234	.318	.445	61
Pete Crow-Armstrong	13	14	3	0	0	0	0	1	2	3	7	.000	.176	.000	0
Michael Fulmer	1	1	0	0	0	0	0	0	0	0	1	.000	.000	.000	0
Yan Gomes	116	382	44	102	20	2	10	63	1	21	81	.267	.315	.408	156
Ian Happ	**158**	580	86	144	**35**	4	21	84	14	**99**	153	.248	**.360**	.431	250
Nico Hoerner	150	**619**	**98**	**175**	27	4	9	68	**43**	49	83	.283	.346	.383	237
Eric Hosmer	31	94	7	22	3	0	2	14	0	6	25	.234	.280	.230	31
Nick Madrigal	92	270	34	71	16	1	2	28	10	10	24	.263	.311	.352	95
Trey Mancini	79	235	31	55	12	0	4	28	0	21	78	.234	.299	.336	79
Miles Mastrobuoni	60	133	24	32	5	0	1	5	13	13	32	.241	.308	.301	40
Matt Mervis	27	90	8	15	2	0	3	11	0	8	32	.167	.242	.289	26
Christopher Morel	107	388	62	96	17	3	**26**	70	6	36	133	.247	.313	.508	197
Edwin Ríos	18	28	3	2	1	0	1	2	0	5	16	.071	.235	.214	6
Seiya Suzuki	138	515	75	147	31	**6**	20	74	6	59	130	.285	.357	.485	250
Dansby Swanson	147	565	81	138	25	3	22	80	9	66	**154**	.244	.328	.416	235
Mike Tauchman	108	338	64	85	18	0	8	48	7	56	86	.252	.363	.377	127
Luis Torrens	13	20	1	5	1	0	0	3	0	1	8	.250	.318	.300	6
Nelson Velázquez	13	29	8	7	2	0	3	6	0	3	8	.241	.313	.621	18
Patrick Wisdom	97	268	43	55	8	1	23	46	4	30	111	.205	.289	.500	134
Jared Young	16	43	8	8	0	3	2	8	2	3	13	.186	.255	.465	20
**TEAM TOTALS**	162	5504	819	1399	269	30	196	786	1340	570	1391	.254	.330	.421	2316

=== Pitching ===
(final statistics)
Note: W = Wins; L = Losses; ERA = Earned run average G = Games pitched; GS = Games started; SV = Saves; IP = Innings pitched; H = Hits allowed; R = Runs allowed; ER = Earned runs allowed; BB = Walks allowed; K = Strikeouts

Player	W	L	ERA	G	GS	SV	IP	H	R	ER	BB	K
Adbert Alzolay	2	5	2.67	58	0	**22**	64.0	52	23	19	13	67
Javier Assad	5	3	3.05	32	10	0	109.1	93	38	37	41	94
Tucker Barnhart	0	0	2.25	4	0	0	4.0	7	1	1	0	0
Brad Boxberger	0	1	4.95	22	0	2	20.0	15	11	11	11	17
Nick Burdi	0	0	9.00	3	0	0	3.0	3	3	3	3	4
José Cuas	0	2	3.04	27	1	1	23.2	17	9	8	14	19
Tyler Duffey	0	0	4.50	11	0	0	2.0	1	1	1	0	3
Jeremiah Estrada	0	0	6.75	12	0	0	10.2	12	8	8	12	13
Michael Fulmer	3	5	4.42	58	1	2	57.0	48	29	28	28	65
Shane Greene	0	0	0.00	2	0	0	3.0	2	0	0	2	3
Kyle Hendricks	6	8	3.74	24	24	0	137.0	138	68	57	27	93
Brandon Hughes	0	3	7.24	17	0	0	13.2	14	11	11	8	17
Anthony Kay	0	0	6.35	13	0	0	11.1	12	8	8	8	8
Caleb Kilian	0	1	16.88	3	1	0	5.1	13	10	10	2	5
Mark Leiter Jr.	1	3	3.50	**69**	0	4	64.1	48	27	25	24	77
Luke Little	0	0	0.00	7	0	0	6.2	5	0	0	4	12
Miles Mastrobuoni	0	0	108.00	1	0	0	0.1	4	4	4	0	0
Julian Merryweather	5	1	3.38	**69**	0	2	72.0	58	28	27	36	98
Daniel Palencia	5	3	4.45	27	0	0	28.1	22	16	14	14	33
Michael Rucker	2	1	4.91	35	0	0	40.1	39	22	22	19	40
Drew Smyly	11	**11**	5.00	41	23	0	142.1	147	89	79	**56**	141
Justin Steele	**16**	5	**3.06**	30	**30**	0	**173.1**	**167**	71	59	36	**176**
Marcus Stroman	10	9	3.95	27	25	0	136.2	120	68	60	52	119
Jameson Taillon	8	10	4.84	30	29	1	154.1	156	**96**	**83**	41	140
Keegan Thompson	2	2	4.71	19	0	1	28.2	20	15	15	26	125
Hayden Wesneski	3	5	4.63	34	11	0	89.1	82	50	46	32	83
Jordan Wicks	4	1	4.41	7	7	0	34.2	33	17	17	11	24
**TEAM TOTALS**	83	79	4.08	162	162	35	1435.1	1328	723	651	513	1377

== Farm system ==
On February 10, the Cubs announced the minor league managers for their farm system.

Level	Team	League	Manager	Location	Ballpark
AAA	Iowa Cubs	International League	Marty Pevey	Des Moines, Iowa	Principal Park
AA	Tennessee Smokies	Southern League	Michael Ryan	Knoxville, Tennessee	Smokies Stadium
High-A	South Bend Cubs	Midwest League	Lance Rymel	South Bend, Indiana	Four Winds Field at Coveleski Stadium
Single-A	Myrtle Beach Pelicans	Carolina League	Buddy Bailey	Myrtle Beach, South Carolina	TicketReturn.com Field
Rookie	ACL Cubs	Arizona Complex League	Nick Lovullo	Mesa, Arizona	Sloan Park
Rookie	DSL Cubs	Dominican Summer League	Enrique Wilson/Carlos Ramirez	Boca Chica, Dominican Republic	Baseball City Complex
