= Miguel Amaya (baseball) =

Panamanian baseball player (born 1999)

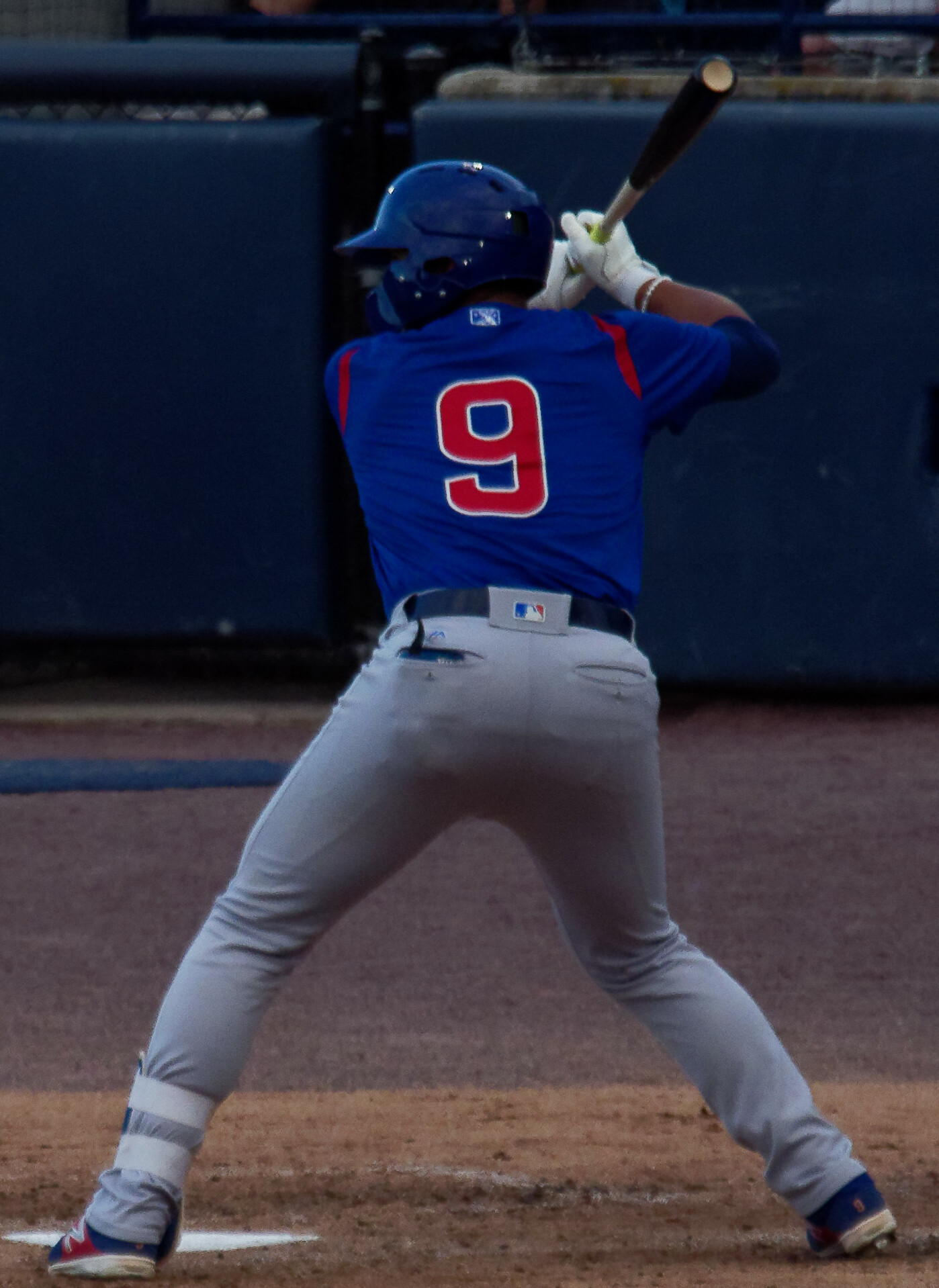
- Amaya with the South Bend Cubs in 2018

Chicago Cubs – No. 9
- Catcher
- Born: March 9, 1999 (age 27); Chitré, Panama
- Bats: Right Throws: Right

MLB debut
- May 4, 2023, for the Chicago Cubs

MLB statistics (through 2026 season)
- Batting average: .236
- Home runs: 23
- Runs batted in: 118
- Stats at Baseball Reference

Teams
- Chicago Cubs (2023–present)

Miguel Antonio Amaya (born March 9, 1999) is a Panamanian professional baseball catcher for the Chicago Cubs of Major League Baseball (MLB). He made his MLB debut in 2023.

== Career ==
Amaya signed with the Chicago Cubs as an international free agent on July 17, 2015. He made his professional debut in 2016 with the Dominican Summer League Cubs where he batted .245 with one home run and 22 runs batted in (RBI) in 58 games.

Amaya played 2017 with the Eugene Emeralds where he slashed .228/.266/.338 with three home runs and 26 RBI in 58 games, and spent 2018 with the South Bend Cubs, earning Midwest League All-Star honors and slashing .256/.349/.403 with 12 home runs and 52 RBI in 116 games. He was selected to play in that year's All-Star Futures Game.

In 2019, Amaya played for the Myrtle Beach Pelicans, batting .235/.351/.402 with 11 home runs and 57 RBI over 99 games. He was also selected to the All-Star Futures Game for the second consecutive year. He was selected to play in the Arizona Fall League for the Mesa Solar Sox following the season.

On November 20, 2019, the Cubs added Amaya to their 40-man roster to protect him from the Rule 5 draft. He did not play in a game in 2020 due to the cancellation of the minor league season because of the COVID-19 pandemic. He underwent Tommy John surgery during the 2021–22 offseason.

The Cubs optioned Amaya to the Double-A Tennessee Smokies to begin the 2023 season. In 13 games for Tennessee, he hit .273/.411/.659 with four home runs and eight RBI. On May 2, 2023, the Cubs promoted Amaya to the major leagues for the first time. He appeared in 53 games with 131 at-bats, and had five home runs and 18 RBI.

In 2024 Amaya shared catching duties with veteran Yan Gomes. He appeared in 116 games for the Cubs during the regular season, recording 328 at-bats, 76 hits, eight home runs, and 47 RBI.

In early 2025, Amaya and veteran Carson Kelly were considered to be one of MLB's best catcher tandems. On May 24, Amaya suffered a left oblique injury on a throw to second and was placed on the injured list. After being transferred to the 60-day injured list on July 31, he was activated on August 12. The next day, he was removed in the midst of a game against the Toronto Blue Jays with an ankle injury, and returned to the IL.
