= Alexander Canario =

Dominican baseball player (born 2000)

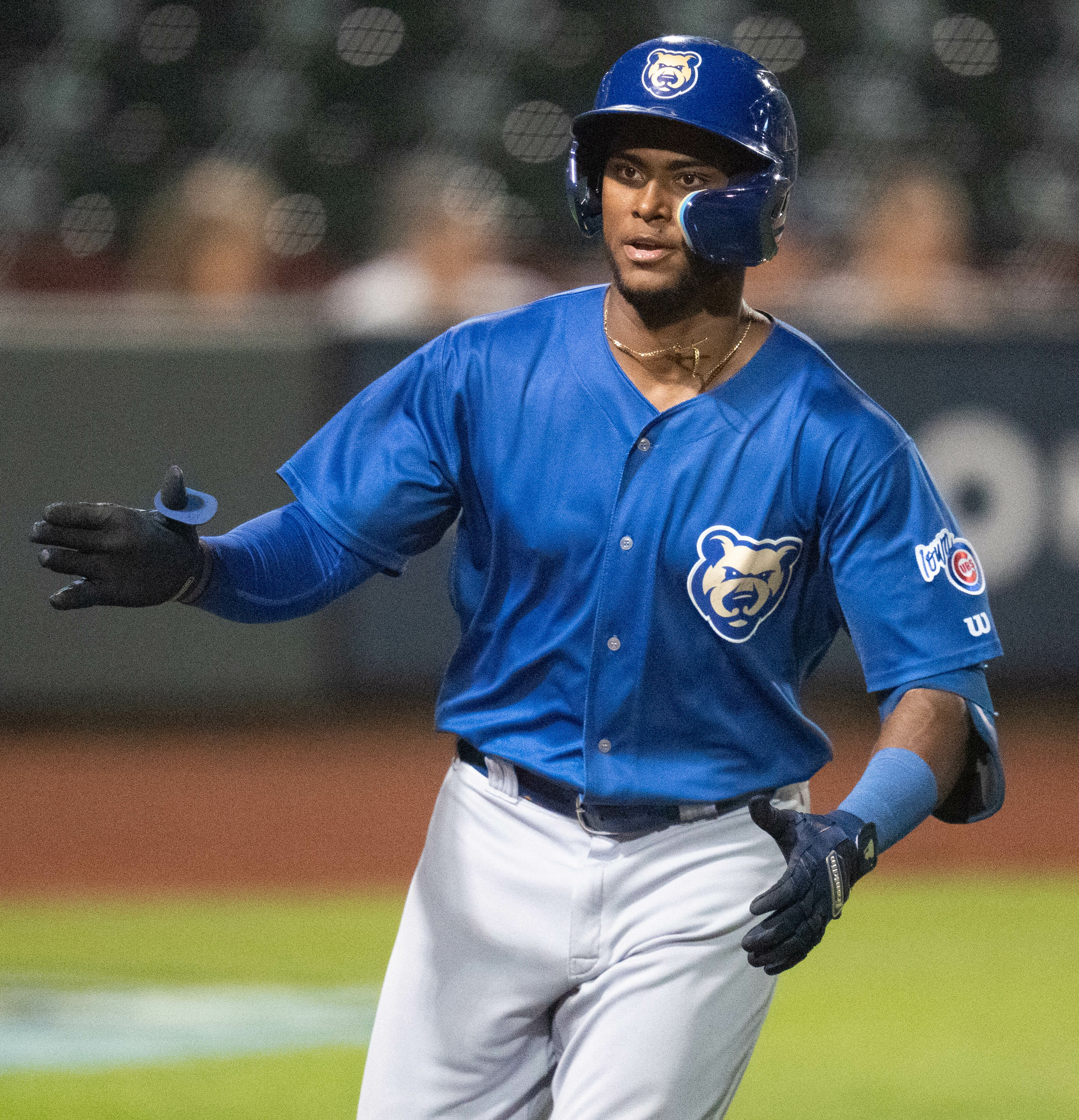
- Canario with the Iowa Cubs in 2022

Saitama Seibu Lions – No. 25
- Outfielder
- Born: May 7, 2000 (age 26); Monte Cristi, Dominican Republic
- Bats: Right Throws: Right

Professional debut
- MLB: September 6, 2023, for the Chicago Cubs
- NPB: March 27, 2026, for the Saitama Seibu Lions

MLB statistics (through 2025 season)
- Batting average: .229
- Home runs: 8
- Runs batted in: 28

NPB statistics (through August 21, 2026)
- Batting average: .246
- Home runs: 11
- Runs batted in: 42
- Stats at Baseball Reference

Teams
- Chicago Cubs (2023–2024); Pittsburgh Pirates (2025); Saitama Seibu Lions (2026–present)

Alexander Canario (born May 7, 2000) is a Dominican professional baseball outfielder for the Saitama Seibu Lions of Nippon Professional Baseball (NPB). He has previously played in Major League Baseball (MLB) for the Chicago Cubs and Pittsburgh Pirates. He made his MLB debut in 2023.

== Professional career ==
=== San Francisco Giants ===
Canario signed with the Giants as an international free agent on July 2, 2016. In 2017, playing for the DSL Giants in the Dominican Summer League, he batted .294/.391/.464 with 17 doubles (3rd in the league), 5 home runs (3rd), and 45 RBI (2nd). He was a Baseball America DSL All-Star.

In 2019, playing for the Low-A Salem-Keizer Volcanoes, Canario batted .301/.365/.539 (4th in the Northwest League) with 38 runs (6th), 17 doubles (leading the league), 9 home runs (2nd), and 40 RBI (3rd). In 43 at-bats for the 2019 Arizona League Giants in the Arizona League, Canario batted .395/.435/1.000 with 7 home runs (8th in the league). He was an MiLB.com Organization All-Star, a Baseball America Short-Season All-Star, and a Northwest League Post-Season All-Star.

Canario did not play in a game in 2020 due to the cancellation of the minor league season because of the COVID-19 pandemic. On November 20, 2020, the Giants added Canario to their 40-man roster in order to protect him from the Rule 5 draft. Canario began the 2021 season with the Single-A San Jose Giants, playing in 65 games and hitting .235/.325/.433 with 9 home runs, 29 RBI, and 15 stolen bases.

=== Chicago Cubs ===
On July 30, 2021, the San Francisco Giants traded Canario along with Caleb Kilian to the Chicago Cubs in exchange for Kris Bryant. Canario appeared in 42 games for the High-A South Bend Cubs to close out the year, hitting .224/.264/.429 with 9 home runs, 28 RBI, and six stolen bases.

In 2022, he appeared in 125 games split between South Bend, the Double-A Tennessee Smokies, and the Triple-A Iowa Cubs, posting a cumulative .252/.343/.556 in 463 at bats with career-highs in runs (84), doubles (16), home runs (37), RBI (97), and stolen bases (23; while only being caught 3 times). He was named an MiLB Organization All Star.

While playing in the Dominican Winter League in the 2022–23 offseason, Canario suffered a fractured left ankle and dislocated left shoulder, and was then optioned to Triple-A Iowa to begin the 2023 season.

On September 1, Canario was recalled to Chicago during September call-ups. Canario finished his Triple-A season slashing .276/.342/.524 with 9 home runs, 47 RBIs, 33 runs, and two stolen bases in 36 games. His first MLB career at bat on September 6, 2023, resulted in a strikeout.

On September 11, Canario was optioned to Triple-A Iowa, after only one plate appearance, to make room for Pete Crow-Armstrong's call-up. The next day, he was called back up to the Cubs as a replacement for Jeimer Candelario who was placed on the 10-day injured list. Canario made his first career start on September 19, 2023, at designated hitter. He recorded his first career hit in the 6th inning, an RBI double. He would follow up with a grand slam in the 8th inning, for his first career home run. In total, he went 2-for-4, with 5 RBI.

Canario was optioned to Triple–A Iowa to begin the 2024 season. In 15 games for Chicago in 2024, he went 7-for-25 (.280) with a .357 on base percentage and one home run, 2 RBI, and one stolen base.

Playing in 2024-25 for Aguilas, he batted .304/.411/.544. Canario was designated for assignment following the signing of Justin Turner on February 20, 2025.

=== Pittsburgh Pirates ===
On February 24, 2025, the Cubs traded Canario to the New York Mets for cash considerations. He was designated for assignment by the Mets on March 27. On March 31, Canario was traded to the Pittsburgh Pirates in exchange for cash considerations. He made 87 appearances for the Pirates, batting .218/.274/.338 with six home runs, 20 RBI, and three stolen bases. Canario was designated for assignment by Pittsburgh on November 18. On November 21, he was non-tendered by the Pirates and became a free agent.

=== Saitama Seibu Lions ===
On December 21, 2025, Canario signed with the Saitama Seibu Lions of Nippon Professional Baseball.
