= Miles Mastrobuoni =

American baseball player (born 1995)

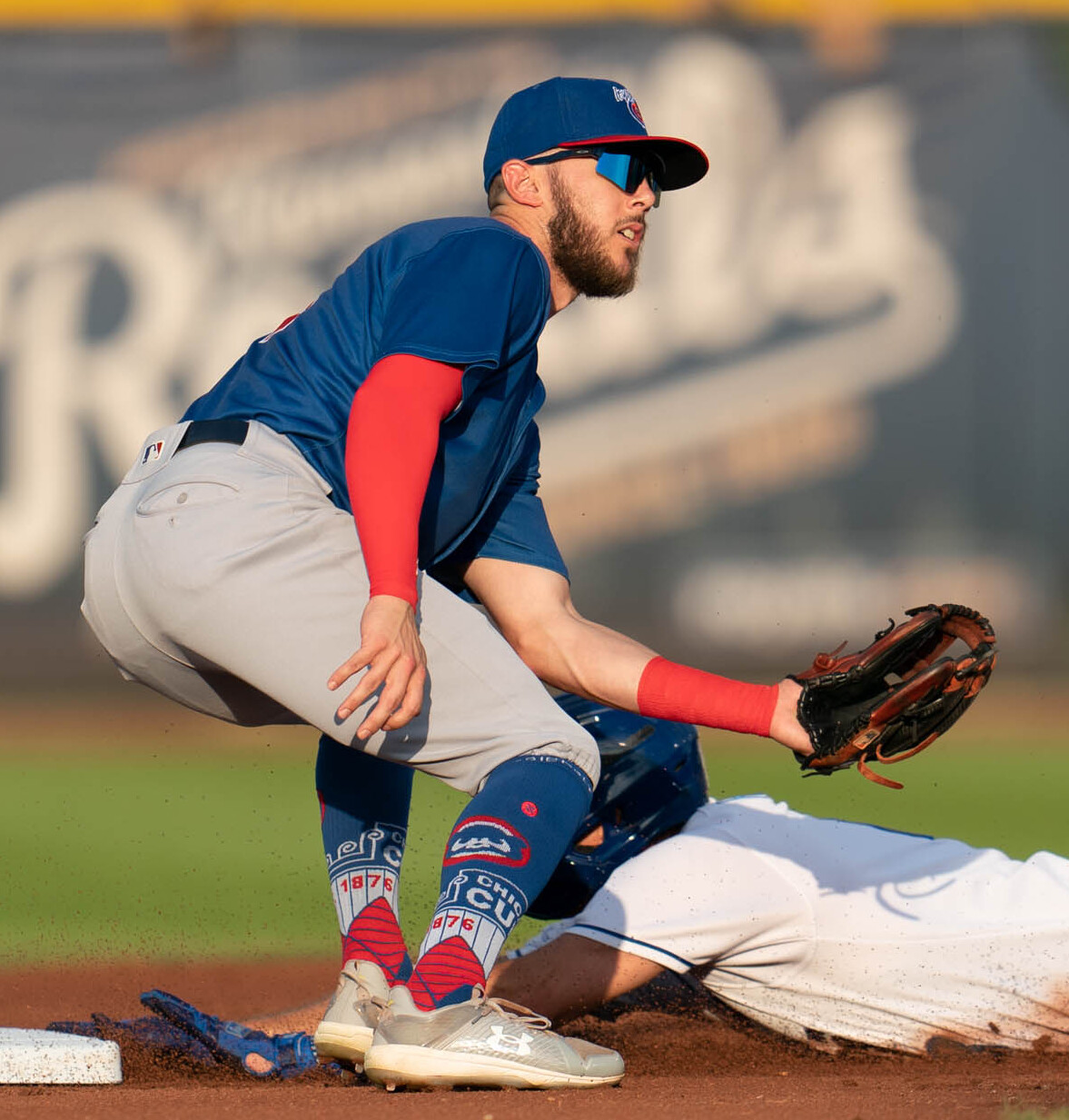
- Mastrobuoni with the Iowa Cubs in 2023

Free agent
- Utility player
- Born: October 31, 1995 (age 31); San Ramon, California, U.S.
- Bats: Left Throws: Right

MLB debut
- September 22, 2022, for the Tampa Bay Rays

MLB statistics (through 2026 season)
- Batting average: .228
- Home runs: 2
- Runs batted in: 22
- Stats at Baseball Reference

Teams
- Tampa Bay Rays (2022); Chicago Cubs (2023–2024); Seattle Mariners (2025–2026)

Miles James Mastrobuoni (born October 31, 1995) is an American professional baseball utility player who is a free agent. He has previously played in Major League Baseball (MLB) for the Tampa Bay Rays, Chicago Cubs, and Seattle Mariners.

== Career ==
=== Amateur career ===
Mastrobuoni attended Granada High School in Livermore, California, and the College of San Mateo, where he played college baseball for two years. He then transferred to play for the Nevada Wolf Pack. In summer 2015, he played summer league baseball for the Rochester Honkers of the Northwoods League.

=== Tampa Bay Rays ===
The Tampa Bay Rays selected Mastrobuoni in the 14th round, with the 420th overall selection, of the 2016 Major League Baseball draft. He made his professional debut with the Low-A Hudson Valley Renegades, hitting .267 in 61 games. He spent the following season with the Single-A Bowling Green Hot Rods, playing in 104 games and batting .264/.346/.348 with 3 home runs, 39 RBI, and 18 stolen bases.

In 2018, Mastrobuoni again played in 104 games, split between the High-A Charlotte Stone Crabs and Double-A Montgomery Biscuits. In 330 at bats, he hit a combined .285/.385/.355 with one home run and an identical 39 RBI. He returned to Montgomery for the majority of the 2019 season, also playing in 4 games for the Triple-A Durham Bulls. Playing in 107 games for the Biscuits, he hit .299/.367/.389 with 4 home runs, 34 RBI, and 15 stolen bases.

Mastrobuoni did not play in a game in 2020 due to the cancellation of the minor league season because of the COVID-19 pandemic. He returned to action in 2021, playing for both Montgomery and Durham. In 106 total games, he batted .296/.378/.424 with 5 home runs and 45 RBI. Mastrobuoni was assigned to Triple-A Durham to begin the 2022 season, where he spent the majority of the year. In 129 games, he hit .300/.377/.469 with career–highs in home runs (16), RBI (64), and stolen bases (23).

On September 22, 2022, Mastrobuoni was selected to the 40-man roster and promoted to the major leagues for the first time. The following day, Mastrobuoni collected his first MLB hit, a single off of Anthony Bass of the Toronto Blue Jays. He played in 8 games for the Rays, going 3-for-16 (.188) with a walk and a stolen base.

=== Chicago Cubs ===
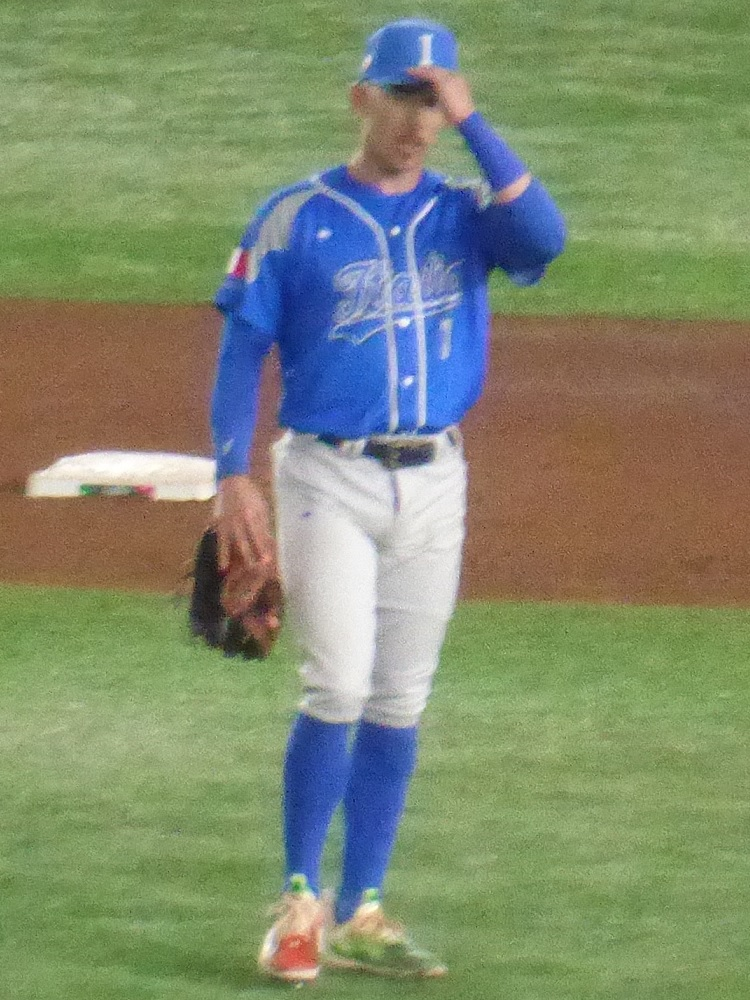
Mastrobuoni with Italy in 2023

On November 15, 2022, the Rays traded Mastrobuoni to the Chicago Cubs for pitcher Alfredo Zárraga. Mastrobuoni made the Cubs' Opening Day roster in 2023. He started at right field, batting ninth against the Milwaukee Brewers in Chicago's 2023 opener. On July 21, Mastrobuoni hit his first career home run, off Jack Flaherty of the St. Louis Cardinals. In 60 games for the Cubs in his rookie season, he slashed .241/.308/.301 with one home run, five RBI, and 13 stolen bases.

Mastrobuoni made 50 appearances for Chicago in 2024, batting .194/.245/.224 with no home runs, four RBI, and two stolen bases. On January 9, 2025, the Cubs designated Mastrobuoni for assignment following the acquisition of Matt Festa.

=== Seattle Mariners ===
On January 14, 2025, Mastrobuoni was traded to the Seattle Mariners in exchange for cash. He started the year as a utility player for the Mariners before being sent to the Triple-A Tacoma Rainiers following the acquisition of Josh Naylor. He returned to the majors within a week as Ben Williamson was demoted but was sent back to Tacoma after the Little League Classic in August. Mastrobuoni played in the final game of the season, hitting a double that was the final extra base hit allowed by Clayton Kershaw of the Los Angeles Dodgers in his regular season career. Mastrobuoni finished the 2025 regular season batting .250/.324/.296 with one home run, 12 RBI, and six stolen bases in 76 games for the Mariners. The Mariners added Mastrobuoni to their roster for the American League Championship Series, replacing Luke Raley.

On April 20, 2026, Mastrobuoni was placed on the 60-day injured list due to a calf injury. He was activated by Seattle on June 10. After hitting .217 across 27 plate appearances, Mastrobuoni was designated for assignment by Seattle on June 19. He cleared waivers and was sent outright to Triple-A Tacoma on June 25. On July 3, Mastrobuoni was added back to Seattle's roster following a concussion suffered by Julio Rodríguez. Mastrobuoni was designated for assignment on July 18, after Rodríguez was activated from the injured list. He cleared waivers and was sent outright to Tacoma on July 22. On October 15, Mastrobuoni elected free agency.

== International career ==
Mastrobuoni played for Italy in the 2023 World Baseball Classic. Over five games, he batted 5-for-18 with two doubles, two RBI, three strikeouts, and a stolen base.
