= Julian Merryweather =

American baseball player (born 1991)

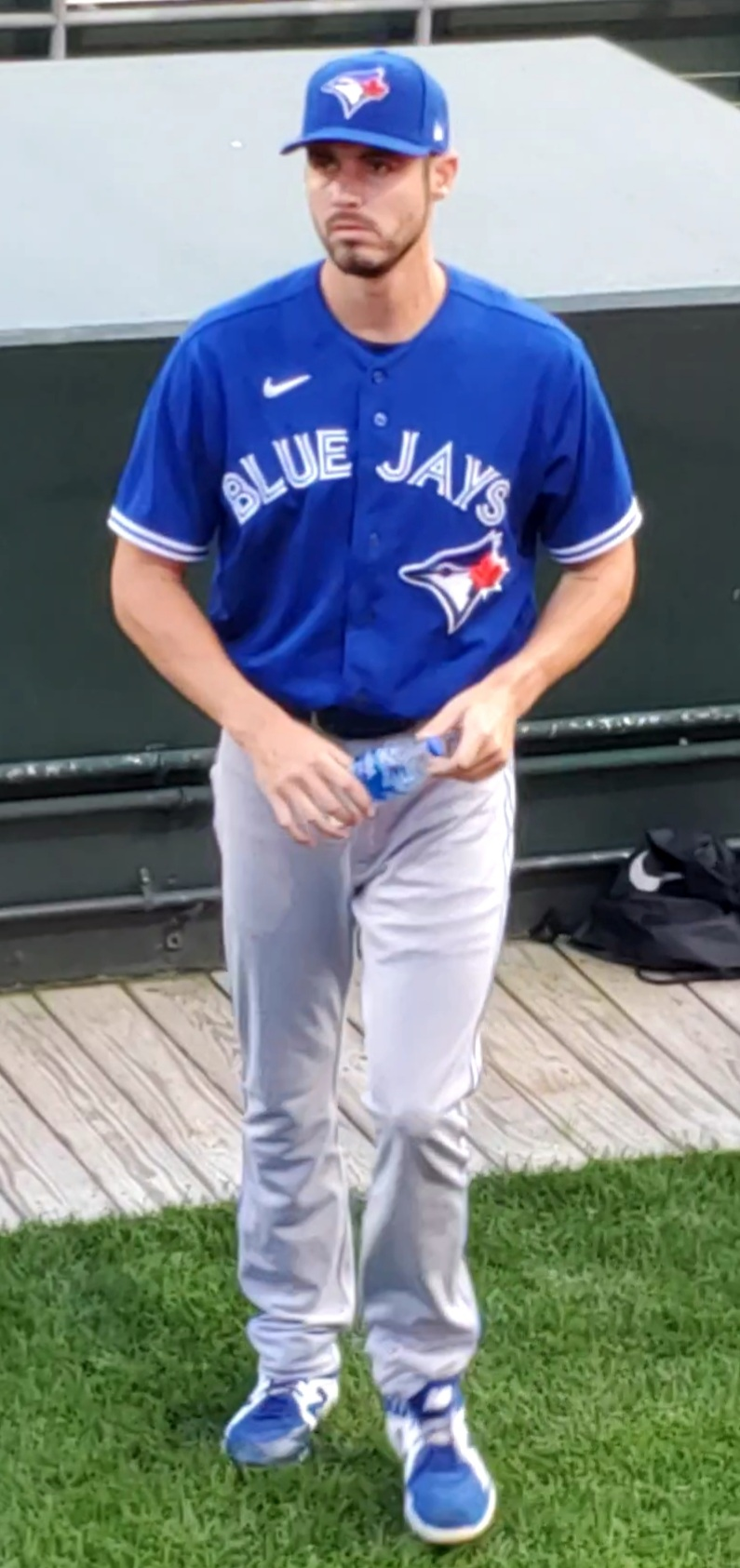
- Merryweather with the Blue Jays in 2021

Free agent
- Pitcher
- Born: October 14, 1991 (age 35); Berkeley, California, U.S.
- Bats: Right Throws: Right

MLB debut
- August 20, 2020, for the Toronto Blue Jays

MLB statistics (through 2025 season)
- Win–loss record: 6–7
- Earned run average: 4.72
- Strikeouts: 177
- Stats at Baseball Reference

Teams
- Toronto Blue Jays (2020–2022); Chicago Cubs (2023–2025)

Julian Christopher Merryweather (born October 14, 1991) is an American professional baseball pitcher who is a free agent. He has previously played in Major League Baseball (MLB) for the Toronto Blue Jays and Chicago Cubs.

== Early life ==
Julian Christopher Merryweather was born on October 14, 1991, in Berkeley, California. Merryweather attended Junípero Serra High School in San Mateo, California, where he excelled in baseball.

== College career ==
Merryweather played college baseball at Skyline College and Oklahoma Baptist University. In two seasons with the Bison, Merryweather pitched to a 22–5 win–loss record, 1.73 earned run average (ERA), and 208 strikeouts.

== Professional career ==
=== Cleveland Indians (2014–2018) ===
==== Minor leagues ====
The Cleveland Indians selected Merryweather in the fifth round of the 2014 Major League Baseball draft. He made his professional debut with the Mahoning Valley Scrappers going 1–2 with a 3.66 ERA in 13 games. He pitched 2015 with the Lake County Captains, posting a 4.08 ERA in 70 2/3 innings, and 2016 with the Lynchburg Hillcats and Akron RubberDucks, going a combined 13–6 with 2.60 ERA in 24 games started between both teams. Merryweather started 2017 with Akron and was promoted to the Columbus Clippers during the season. In 25 total games between Akron and Columbus, Merryweather pitched to a 7–9 record and 5.32 ERA. The Indians added him to their 40-man roster after the season.

Merryweather injured his pitching elbow during the Indians' 2018 spring training camp. The Indians subsequently announced he would need Tommy John surgery and would miss the entire 2018 season.

=== Toronto Blue Jays (2019–2022) ===
On October 5, 2018, Merryweather was sent to the Toronto Blue Jays as the player to be named later from the trade that sent Josh Donaldson to Cleveland in August of that year.

In 2019, Merryweather made two appearances, starting a game apiece for the rookie–level Gulf Coast Blue Jays and High–A Dunedin Blue Jays. He played for the Scottsdale Scorpions of the Arizona Fall League during the offseason. Merryweather did not open the 2020 season with an affiliate after the minor league season was cancelled because of the COVID-19 pandemic.

==== Major leagues ====
Merryweather made his major league debut on August 20, 2020, against the Philadelphia Phillies. On August 26, he made his first MLB start. With the 2020 Toronto Blue Jays, Merryweather appeared in 13 games, compiling a 0-0 record with 4.15 ERA and 15 strikeouts in 13 innings pitched.

On May 5, 2021, Merryweather was placed on the 60-day injured list with an oblique strain. On September 8, Merryweather was activated off of the injured list. He made 13 appearances for Toronto, posting a 4.85 ERA with 12 strikeouts and 2 saves.

On July 2, 2022, Merryweather was placed on the 60-day injured list with an oblique injury. He was activated on September 5. He made 26 total appearances for Toronto on the year, posting a 6.75 ERA with 23 strikeouts in 26 2/3 innings pitched.

Merryweather was designated for assignment by the Blue Jays on January 10, 2023, after the signing of Brandon Belt became official.

=== Chicago Cubs (2023–2025) ===
On January 17, 2023, Merryweather was claimed off waivers by the Chicago Cubs. In 69 games out of the bullpen, he registered a 3.38 ERA with 98 strikeouts across 72 innings of work.

In 2024, Merryweather began the year as part of Chicago's relief corps, posting a 1.93 ERA across 4 contests. However, he suffered a right shoulder strain and was placed on the injured list on April 7, 2024. After undergoing additional testing, he was diagnosed with a rib stress fracture in his back, and was transferred to the 60–day injured list on April 17. Merryweather was activated from the injured list on July 22. In 15 total games for Chicago, he struggled to a 6.60 ERA with 14 strikeouts across 15 innings pitched. On September 19, it was announced that Merryweather would undergo a patellar tendon debridement surgery on his knee, ending his season.

Merryweather made 21 appearances for Chicago in 2025, posting an 0-1 record and 5.79 ERA with 15 strikeouts across 18 1/3 innings pitched. On May 24, 2025, Merryweather was designated for assignment by the Cubs. He was released by Chicago on May 30.

=== New York Mets ===
On June 7, 2025, Merryweather signed a minor league contract with the New York Mets. In 12 appearances for the Triple-A Syracuse Mets, he logged a 1–0 record and 4.50 ERA with 15 strikeouts and two saves over 12 innings of work. Merryweather was released by the Mets organization on August 2.

=== Milwaukee Brewers ===
On August 8, 2025, Merryweather signed a minor league contract with the Milwaukee Brewers organization. He made 11 appearances for the Triple-A Nashville Sounds, but struggled to a 7.36 ERA with 16 strikeouts and one save over 11 innings of work. Merryweather elected free agency following the season on November 6.

=== Minnesota Twins ===
On February 12, 2026, Merryweather signed a minor league contract with the Minnesota Twins. In 25 games (2 starts) between three levels of the minors he threw 26.2 innings going 0-3 with a 4.05 ERA with 35 strikeouts and 7 saves. He elected free agency on November 2.
