= Javier Assad =

Mexican baseball player (born 1997)

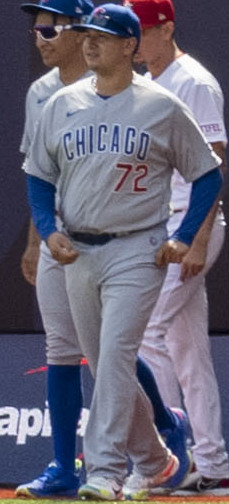
- Assad with the Chicago Cubs in 2023

Chicago Cubs – No. 72
- Pitcher
- Born: July 30, 1997 (age 29); Tijuana, Mexico
- Bats: Right Throws: Right

MLB debut
- August 23, 2022, for the Chicago Cubs

MLB statistics (through 2026 season)
- Win–loss record: 24–14
- Earned run average: 3.47
- Strikeouts: 334
- Stats at Baseball Reference

Teams
- Chicago Cubs (2022–present)
Medals
Men's baseball
Representing Mexico
World Baseball Classic
| Bronze medal – third place | 2023 Miami | Team |

Javier Eduardo Assad Ramírez (born July 30, 1997) is a Mexican professional baseball pitcher for the Chicago Cubs of Major League Baseball (MLB).

== Early life ==
Assad was born and raised in Tijuana, Mexico. While playing Little League Baseball as a youth, he was teammates with future professional baseball player Alfonso Rivas. Assad and Rivas later became teammates on the Cubs in 2022.

== Career ==
Assad signed with the Chicago Cubs as an international free agent on July 27, 2015. He made his professional debut with the rookie-level Arizona League Cubs in 2016, pitching to a 2.87 ERA in 10 games. He spent the 2017 season with the Low-A Eugene Emeralds, logging a 5–6 record and 4.23 ERA with 72 strikeouts in 13 starts. He pitched in 23 games (21 starts) for the Single-A South Bend Cubs in 2018, registering a 5–7 record and 4.40 ERA with 89 strikeouts in 106 1/3 innings of work.

On May 3, 2019, while playing for the High-A Myrtle Beach Pelicans, Assad attempted to field a push bunt from Marco Hernández of the Salem Red Sox, but dropped the ball on the transfer. In an attempt to save the play, Assad kicked the ball towards first base, where first baseman Cam Balego caught it to record an out. A video of the play would go viral on Twitter. In 22 starts for Myrtle Beach in 2019, Assad posted a 4–10 record and 3.87 ERA with 91 strikeouts in 116 1/3 innings pitched. He did not play in a game in 2020 due to the cancellation of the minor league season because of the COVID-19 pandemic.

Assad spent the 2021 season with the Double-A Tennessee Smokies, recording a 4–8 record and 5.32 ERA with 74 strikeouts in 93 innings pitched. He began the 2022 season with Tennessee before being promoted to the Triple-A Iowa Cubs. In 23 combined appearances (21 starts) Assad excelled to the tune of a 5–3 record and 2.66 ERA with 111 strikeouts in 108 1/3 innings of work.

On August 23, 2022, Assad was promoted to the major leagues for the first time. He made his MLB debut that night in a spot start against the St. Louis Cardinals. On September 12, Assad earned his first career victory after allowing 1 run on 5 hits and 3 walks across 6 innings of work against the New York Mets.

In 2024, the Marquee Sports Network considered Assad to have "developed into" a "crucial piece" for the Cubs, after previously being an overlooked pitcher. Assad started 29 contests for the Cubs during the regular season, posting a 7-6 record and 3.73 ERA with 124 strikeouts across 147 innings pitched.

Assad was placed on the injured list to begin the 2025 season due to oblique soreness. On April 25, 2025, Assad was shut down due to a Grade 2 strain of his left oblique. He was transferred to the 60-day injured list on April 30. Assad was activated from the injured list for his season debut on August 12. He made eight total appearances (including seven starts) for Chicago, compiling a 4-1 record and 3.65 ERA with 23 strikeouts over 37 innings pitched.

Assad was optioned to Triple-A Iowa to begin the 2026 season.

== International career ==
Assad played for Team Mexico in the 2023 World Baseball Classic. In the Quarterfinal Game against Puerto Rico on March 12, 2023, Assad threw 2 2/3 scoreless innings in relief.

Assad also pitched for Mexico in the World Baseball Classic in 2026.

== Personal life ==
On February 11, 2022, Assad married Melissa.
