= 2024 Chicago Cubs season =

2024 Chicago Cubs
- League: National League
- Division: Central
- Ballpark: Wrigley Field
- City: Chicago
- Record: 83–79 (.512)
- Divisional place: 3rd
- Owners: Tom Ricketts
- President of baseball operations: Jed Hoyer
- General managers: Carter Hawkins
- Manager: Craig Counsell
- Television: Marquee Sports Network; Jon Sciambi, Jim Deshaies, Pat Hughes, Beth Mowins, Elise Menaker, Joe Girardi, Taylor McGregor, Jon Lester, Alex Cohen, Zach Zaidman
- Radio: WSCR; Chicago Cubs Radio Network; Pat Hughes, Ron Coomer, Zach Zaidman

The 2024 Chicago Cubs season was the 153rd season of the Chicago Cubs franchise, the 149th in the National League, and the Cubs' 109th season at Wrigley Field. The Cubs were led by first-year manager Craig Counsell and played as members of Major League Baseball's National League Central division.

On September 21, the Cubs were eliminated from playoff contention for the fourth consecutive season after losing to the Washington Nationals. The team finished the season with an 83–79 record, matching their record from the previous season. They finished the season in a tie for second place in the division with the St. Louis Cardinals, 10 games behind the Milwaukee Brewers.

== Previous season ==
The Cubs finished the 2023 season 83–79 to finish in second place in the Central division, nine games behind the Brewers. After being in position for a wild card spot through most of August and September, the Cubs finished one game out of the final wild card spot. It marked the third consecutive season they failed to make the playoffs.

== Offseason ==
=== Coaching changes ===
On November 6, 2023, the Cubs fired manager David Ross after four seasons. Craig Counsell, who had managed the Milwaukee Brewers for the previous nine years, was named the new manager on the same day in a surprising move. There had been no prior indications that the Cubs would fire Ross or were interested in hiring Counsell. The Cubs gave Counsell a contract for five years at $8 million per year, making him the highest paid manager in MLB history.

On January 2, 2024, the Cubs named Ryan Flaherty the team's bench coach. Other new coaches included Darren Holmes as the bullpen coach, Mark Strittmatter as major league field coordinator, and assistant hitting coach John Mallee, who had previously been the Cubs' hitting coach from 2015 to 2017.

=== Transactions ===
==== October 2023 ====
October 2	Activated RHP Brad Boxberger from 15-day Injured List. Activated IF Nico Hoerner from 10-day IL. Recalled RHP Ben Brown, OF Brennen Davis, RHP Jeremiah Estrada, RHP Caleb Kilian, IF Matt Mervis, RHP Michael Rucker, and LHP Jordan Wicks from Iowa Cubs. Recalled RHPs Keegan Thompson and Hayden Wesneski from Arizona Complex League Cubs. Recalled OF Kevin Alcántara from Tennessee Smokies.

==== November 2023 ====
November 2	IF Jeimer Candelario, RHP Tyler Duffey, RHP Michael Fulmer, and RHP Shane Greene elected free agency.
November 6	OF Cody Bellinger, RHP Brad Boxberger, and RHP Marcus Stroman elected free agency. Activated RHP Codi Heuer, IF Nick Madrigal, LHP Brandon Hughes, and RHP Ethan Roberts. Traded LHP Brendon Little to Toronto Blue Jays for cash. Selected the contract of IF Luis Vazquez from Iowa. Sent RHP Nick Burdi outright to Iowa.
November 8	Signed freed agent IF Ronnyel Espinoza to a minor league contract.
November 14	Selected the contract of LHP Bailey Horn from Iowa. Selected the contract of RHP Porter Hodge from Tennessee. Selected the contracts of RHP Micheal Arias from South Bend Cubs.
November 17	RHP Codi Heuer, LHP Brandon Hughes, and RHP Ethan Roberts elected free agency.
November 28	Signed free agents C Ivan Cespedes and RHP Alberto Chala to minor league contracts.
November 29	Signed free agents LHPs Edwin Escobar and Jeremy Guzman to minor league contracts.

==== December 2023 ====
December 2	Signed free agent RHP Ethan Roberts to a minor league contract.
December 14	Signed free agents C Jorge Alfaro, C Joe Hudson, and LHP Thomas Pannone to minor league contracts.
December 22	Signed free agent RHP Colten Brewer to a minor league contract.

==== January 2024 ====
January 5	Claimed C Brian Serven off waivers from Colorado Rockies.
January 11	Signed free agent LHP Shōta Imanaga.
January 15	Signed free agents SS Fernando Cruz, 2B Enyel Rosario, OF Jesus Rodriguez, SS Ezequiel Pen, RHP Yander Maria, RHP Frailin Alejo, RHP Julian Duran, SS Juan Monso, OF Cesar Lugo, SS Isaac Moscote, #B Edgardo De Leo, C Diego Gonzalez, and OF Robin Ortiz to minor league contracts.
January 16	Signed free agent LHP Richard Lovelady to a minor league contract.
January 31	Signed free agent RHP Sam McWilliams to a minor league contract.

==== February 2024 ====
February 1	Signed free agent RHP Hector Neris. Designated RHP Michael Rucker for assignment.
February 2	Signed free agent LHP Blake Weiman to a minor league contract.
February 6	Signed free agent RHP Carl Edwards Jr. to a minor league contract. Traded RHP Michael Rucker to Philadelphia Phillies for cash.
February 7	Signed free agent RHP JC Coronado to a minor league contract.
February 9	Invited non-roster LHP Brad Wieck, SS Matt Shaw, RHP Chris Clarke, C Pablo Aliendo, OF Owen Caissie, RHP Cam Sanders, 2B David Bote, 2B Chase Strumpf, RHP Riley Thompson, C Jorge Alfaro, and 2B Bryce Windham to spring training.
February 19	Signed free agent IF Jesus Meneses to a minor league contract.
February 23	Invited non-roster C Haydn McGeary to spring training. C Casey Opitz, RHP Connor Noland, RHP Nick Hull, SS Josh Rivera, RHP Frankie Scalzo Jr., RHP Joe Nahas, OF Cole Roederer, SS Jefferson Rojas, and RHP Hunter Bigge assigned to Chicago Cubs.
February 24	RHP Jose Romero, RHP Chris Kachmar, 1B Jonathon Long, OF Brett Bateman, RHP Jose Romero, RHP Yovanny Cabrera, RHP Yovanny Cabrera, and OF Ezequiel Pagan assigned to Chicago Cubs.
February 25	LHP Riley Martin, OF Christian Franklin, OF Bradlee Beesley, RHP Tyler Santana, 3B BJ Murray Jr., C Moises Ballesteros, RHP Cayne Ueckert, RHP Blake Whitney, RHP Sam Armstrong, and SS Hayden Cantrelle assigned to Chicago Cubs.
February 26	RHP Richard Gallardo, SS Jake Slaughter, RHP Luis Devers, OF Darius Hill, and OF Jordan Nwogu assigned to Chicago Cubs.
February 27	Signed free agent OF Cody Bellinger. Traded LHP Bailey Horn to Chicago White Sox for RHP Matthew Thompson. LF David Peralta, 3B James Triantos, RHP Matthew Thompson, and 1B Dominic Smith assigned to Chicago Cubs.
February 28	SS Reivaj Garcia assigned to Chicago Cubs.

==== March 2024 ====
March 1	Signed free agent RHPs Cesar Pierret and Jhon Rosario to a minor league contract. Signed free agent 1B Garrett Cooper to a minor league contract and invited him to spring training.
March 2	SS Ed Howard and RHP Eduarniel Núñez assigned to Chicago Cubs.
March 4	SS Rafael Morel, SS Luis Verdugo, and OF Yohendrick Pinango assigned to Chicago Cubs.
March 7	RHP Jake Reindl assigned to Chicago Cubs.
March 8	LHP Chase Watkins and SS Cristian Hernandez assigned to Chicago Cubs. Optioned SS Luis Vazquez, OF Brennen Davis, OF Pete Crow-Armstrong, and OF RHP Ben Brown to Iowa. Optioned RHP Michael Arias, RHP Porter Hodge, and OF Kevin Alcántara to Tennessee.
March 9	OF Parker Chavers assigned to Chicago Cubs.
March 10	SS Liam Spence, SS Scott McKeon, CF Jacob Wetzel, SS Fabian Pertuz, CF Ismael Mena and 2B Juan Mora assigned to Chicago Cubs.
March 13	OF Jefferson Encarnacion and OF Cristian More assigned to Chicago Cubs.
March 14	SS Christian Olivo assigned to Chicago Cubs.
March 15	SS Leonel Espinoza and LHP Dalton Stambaugh assigned to Chicago Cubs.
March 16	OF Alfonsin Rosario, 3B Brian Kalmer, RHP Zac Leigh, and C Caleb Knight assigned to Chicago Cubs.
March 17	Optioned RHP Keegan Thompson and 1B Matt Mervis to Iowa.
March 21	Optioned RHP Daniel Palencia to Iowa. Assigned 3B Drew Bowser and RHP Porter Hodge to Chicago Cubs.
March 22	Assigned OF Andy Garriola, and C Ethan Hearn to Chicago Cubs.
March 23	Assigned RHP Hunter Viets to Chicago Cubs.
March 24	Released RHP Carl Edwards Jr and IF Dominic Smith.
March 25	Optioned OF Alexander Canario and RHP Hayden Wesneski to Iowa. Assigned SS Pedro Ramirez to Chicago Cubs.
March 26	Assigned C David Avitia and OF Kevin Alcatara to Chicago Cubs.

== Regular season ==
=== Opening Day starters ===
Thursday, March 28, 2024, vs. Texas Rangers at Globe Life Field.

Name	Pos.
Ian Happ	LF
Seiya Suzuki	RF
Cody Bellinger	CF
Christopher Morel	DH
Dansby Swanson	SS
Michael Busch	1B
Nico Hoerner	2B
Nick Madrigal	3B
Yan Gomes	C
Justin Steele	P

=== Game log ===
Legend
	Cubs win
	Cubs loss
	Postponement
	Eliminated from playoff race
**Bold**	Cubs team member

2024 game log: 83–79 (Home: 44–37; Road: 39–42)
March/April: 18–12 (Home: 10–3; Road: 8–9)

#	Date	Opponent	Score	Win	Loss	Save	Attendance	Record	Streak/ box
1	March 28	@ Rangers	3–4 (10)	Robertson (1–0)	**Smyly** (0–1)	—	42,130	0–1	L1
2	March 30	@ Rangers	2–11	Bradford (1–0)	**Hendricks** (0–1)	—	37,570	0–2	L2
3	March 31	@ Rangers	9–5	**Neris** (1–0)	Leclerc (0–1)	—	32,078	1–2	W1
4	April 1	Rockies	5–0	**Imanaga** (1–0)	Hudson (0–1)	—	40,072	2–2	W2
5	April 2	Rockies	12–2	**Assad** (1–0)	Freeland (0–2)	—	26,555	3–2	W3
6	April 3	Rockies	9–8	**Alzolay** (1–0)	Mears (0–1)	—	25,900	4–2	W4
7	April 5	Dodgers	9–7	**Smyly** (1–1)	Miller (1–1)	**Alzolay** (1)	34,981	5–2	W5
8	April 6	Dodgers	1–4	Yamamoto (1–1)	**Wicks** (0–1)	—	41,040	5–3	L1
9	April 7	Dodgers	8–1	**Almonte** (1–0)	Stone (0–1)	**Palencia** (1)	38,322	6–3	W1
10	April 8	@ Padres	8–9	Peralta (1–0)	**Alzolay** (1–1)	Suárez (4)	33,864	6–4	L1
11	April 9	@ Padres	5–1	**Smyly** (2–1)	Musgrove (1–2)	―	35,171	7–4	W1
12	April 10	@ Padres	2–10	Cease (1–1)	**Hendricks** (0–2)	—	39,048	7–5	L1
13	April 12	@ Mariners	2–4	Miller (2–1)	**Wicks** (0–2)	Stanek (2)	33,500	7–6	L2
14	April 13	@ Mariners	4–1	**Imanaga** (2–0)	Hancock (1–2)	**Alzolay** (2)	38,104	8–6	W1
15	April 14	@ Mariners	3–2	**Assad** (2–0)	Castillo (0–4)	**Alzolay** (3)	32,423	9–6	W2
16	April 15	@ Diamondbacks	3–2 (11)	**Thompson** (1–0)	Jarvis (0–1)	—	24,468	10–6	W3
17	April 16	@ Diamondbacks	11–12 (10)	Ginkel (1–0)	**Smyly** (2–2)	—	26,426	10–7	L1
18	April 17	@ Diamondbacks	5–3	**Wesneski** (1–0)	Pfaadt (1–1)	—	26,567	11–7	W1
—	April 18	Marlins	Postponed (rain); Makeup: April 20						
19	April 19	Marlins	8–3	**Taillon** (1–0)	Puk (0–4)	—	29,595	12–7	W2
20	April 20 (1)	Marlins	2–3	Faucher (1–0)	**Alzolay** (1–2)	Scott (3)	36,379	12–8	L1
21	April 20 (2)	Marlins	5–3	**Imanaga** (3–0)	Bender (0–1)	**Neris** (1)	32,386	13–8	W1
22	April 21	Marlins	3–6	Cabrera (1–0)	**Hendricks** (0–3)	Scott (4)	36,067	13–9	L1
23	April 23	Astros	7–2	**Wicks** (1–2)	France (0–3)	**Almonte** (1)	30,643	14–9	W1
24	April 24	Astros	4–3	**Taillon** (2–0)	Arrighetti (0–3)	**Neris** (2)	32,327	15–9	W2
25	April 25	Astros	3–1	**Wesneski** (2–0)	Montero (0–1)	**Neris** (3)	29,876	16–9	W3
26	April 26	@ Red Sox	7–1	**Imanaga** (4–0)	Crawford (1–1)	—	31,801	17–9	W4
27	April 27	@ Red Sox	0–17	Slaten (2–0)	**Brown** (0–1)	—	35,169	17–10	L1
28	April 28	@ Red Sox	4–5	Jansen (1–0)	**Leiter Jr.** (0–1)	—	32,052	17–11	L2
29	April 29	@ Mets	3–1	**Leiter Jr.** (1–1)	Díaz (0–1)	**Neris** (4)	25,046	18–11	W1
30	April 30	@ Mets	2–4	Reid-Foley (1–0)	**Alzolay** (1–3)	López (2)	22,880	18–12	L1

May: 10–18 (Home: 5–9; Road: 5–9)

#	Date	Opponent	Score	Win	Loss	Save	Attendance	Record	Streak/ box
31	May 1	@ Mets	1–0	**Imanaga** (5–0)	Buttó (0–2)	**Neris** (5)	22,485	19–12	W1
32	May 2	@ Mets	6–7 (11)	Young (1–0)	**Palencia** (0–1)	—	22,224	19–13	L1
33	May 3	Brewers	1–3	Peguero (4–0)	**Alzolay** (1–4)	Megill (2)	33,557	19–14	L2
34	May 4	Brewers	6–5	**Taillon** (3–0)	Myers (0–2)	**Neris** (6)	40,505	20–14	W1
35	May 5	Brewers	5–0	**Assad** (3–0)	Peralta (3–1)	—	39,299	21–14	W2
36	May 6	Padres	3–6	Darvish (2–1)	**Lovelady** (0–1)	Suárez (11)	35,560	21–15	L1
37	May 7	Padres	3–2	**Neris** (2–0)	De Los Santos (1–2)	—	38,133	22–15	W1
38	May 8	Padres	0–3	Cease (5–2)	**Wesneski** (2–1)	Suárez (11)	30,138	22–16	L1
39	May 10	@ Pirates	7–2	**Brown** (1–1)	Jones (2–4)	—	16,454	23–16	W1
40	May 11	@ Pirates	9–10	Holderman (1–0)	**Thompson** (1–1)	Bednar (7)	34,924	23–17	L1
41	May 12	@ Pirates	5–4 (10)	**Neris** (3–0)	Chapman (0–3)	**Alzolay** (4)	18,554	24–17	W1
42	May 13	@ Braves	0–2	Kerr (1–0)	**Wesneski** (2–2)	Minter (1)	34,582	24–18	L1
43	May 14	@ Braves	0–7	Sale (6–1)	**Taillon** (3–1)	—	37,357	24–19	L2
44	May 15	@ Braves	7–1	**Assad** (4–0)	Morton (3–1)	—	36,623	25–19	W1
45	May 16	Pirates	4–5	Jones (3–4)	**Steele** (0–1)	Bednar (9)	36,202	25–20	L1
46	May 17	Pirates	3–9	Skenes (1–0)	**Hendricks** (0–4)	—	35,372	25–21	L2
47	May 18	Pirates	1–0	**Neris** (4–0)	Bednar (2–3)	—	39,857	26–21	W1
48	May 19	Pirates	2–3	Keller (5–3)	**Taillon** (3–2)	Bednar (10)	39,008	26–22	L1
49	May 21	Braves	4–3 (10)	**Little** (1–0)	Bummer (1–2)	—	36,121	27–22	W1
50	May 22	Braves	2–9	Fried (4–2)	**Steele** (0–2)	—	37,584	27–23	L1
51	May 23	Braves	0–3	Lee (1–1)	**Wesneski** (2–3)	Iglesias (12)	35,646	27–24	L2
—	May 24	@ Cardinals	Postponed (rain); Makeup: July 13						
52	May 25	@ Cardinals	6–7	Romero (2–0)	**Leiter Jr.** (1–2)	Helsley (16)	45,071	27–25	L3
53	May 26	@ Cardinals	3–4	Gray (7–2)	**Assad** (4–1)	Helsley (17)	40,892	27–26	L4
54	May 27	@ Brewers	1–5	Hudson (3–0)	**Leiter Jr.** (1–3)	—	41,882	27–27	L5
55	May 28	@ Brewers	6–3 (10)	**Neris** (5–0)	Megill (0–1)	—	24,076	28–27	W1
56	May 29	@ Brewers	6–10	Koenig (5–1)	**Imanaga** (5–1)	—	26,695	28–28	L1
57	May 30	@ Brewers	4–6	Hudson (4–0)	**Little** (1–1)	Peguero (1)	33,219	28–29	L2
58	May 31	Reds	4–5	Cruz (2–5)	**Smyly** (2–3)	Díaz (11)	36,281	28–30	L3

June: 11–16 (Home: 7–6; Road: 4–10)

#	Date	Opponent	Score	Win	Loss	Save	Attendance	Record	Streak/ box
59	June 1	Reds	7–5	**Leiter Jr.** (2–3)	Sims (1–2)	**Neris** (7)	36,430	29–30	W1
60	June 2	Reds	2–5	Lodolo (5–2)	**Brown** (1–2)	Díaz (12)	38,129	29–31	L1
61	June 4	White Sox	7–6	**Little** (2–1)	Leasure (0–1)	**Neris** (8)	38,397	30–31	W1
62	June 5	White Sox	7–6	**Neris** (6–0)	Kopech (1–6)	—	40,073	31–31	W2
63	June 6	@ Reds	4–8	Greene (4–2)	**Assad** (4–2)	—	25,601	31–32	L1
64	June 7	@ Reds	2–3	Lodolo (6–2)	**Steele** (0–3)	Díaz (13)	37,501	31–33	L2
65	June 8	@ Reds	3–4	Abbott (5–5)	**Brown** (1–3)	Wilson (1)	40,274	31–34	L3
66	June 9	@ Reds	4–2	**Imanaga** (6–1)	Montas (3–5)	**Neris** (9)	32,737	32–34	W1
67	June 11	@ Rays	2–5	Devenski (2–1)	**Neris** (6–1)	—	15,192	32–35	L1
68	June 12	@ Rays	4–3	**Miller** (1–0)	Cleavinger (4–1)	**Neris** (10)	16,927	33–35	W1
69	June 13	@ Rays	2–3	Bradley (2–4)	**Leiter Jr.** (2–4)	Fairbanks (9)	19,679	33–36	L1
70	June 14	Cardinals	0–3	Gibson (5–2)	**Wesneski** (2–4)	Helsley (23)	40,160	33–37	L2
71	June 15	Cardinals	5–1	**Imanaga** (7–1)	Pallante (2–3)	—	40,088	34–37	W1
72	June 16	Cardinals	1–2	Mikolas (5–6)	**Taillon** (3–3)	Helsley (24)	39,118	34–38	L1
73	June 17	Giants	6–7	Miller (2–2)	**Neris** (6–2)	Doval (13)	36,048	34–39	L2
74	June 18	Giants	5–2	**Miller** (2–0)	Rogers (0–2)	**Thompson** (1)	36,297	35–39	W1
75	June 19	Giants	6–5	**Hendricks** (1–4)	Bivens (1–1)	**Brewer** (1)	37,673	36–39	W2
76	June 21	Mets	1–11	Quintana (3–5)	**Imanaga** (7–2)	—	37,037	36–40	L1
77	June 22	Mets	8–1	**Taillon** (4–3)	Megill (2–4)	—	39,319	37–40	W1
78	June 23	Mets	2–5	Severino (5–2)	**Assad** (4–3)	Diekman (3)	39,417	37–41	L1
79	June 24	@ Giants	4–5	Howard (1–1)	**Smyly** (2–4)	—	30,701	37–42	L2
80	June 25	@ Giants	1–5	Rogers (1–2)	**Hendricks** (1–5)	—	30,368	37–43	L3
81	June 26	@ Giants	3–4	Jackson (4–1)	**Smyly** (2–5)	Doval (14)	30,893	37–44	L4
82	June 27	@ Giants	5–3 (10)	**Neris** (7–2)	Jackson (4–2)	**Hodge** (1)	31,535	38–44	W1
83	June 28	@ Brewers	2–4	Rea (7–2)	**Taillon** (4–4)	Megill (17)	39,298	38–45	L1
84	June 29	@ Brewers	5–3	**Little** (3–1)	Payamps (1–4)	**Neris** (11)	42,238	39–45	W1
85	June 30	@ Brewers	1–7	Peralta (6–4)	**Hendricks** (1–6)	—	42,658	39–46	L1

July: 13–12 (Home: 5–7; Road: 8–5)

#	Date	Opponent	Score	Win	Loss	Save	Attendance	Record	Streak/ box
86	July 2	Phillies	4–6	Mercado (1–0)	**Wesneski** (2–5)	Hoffman (7)	38,670	39–47	L2
87	July 3	Phillies	3–5	Strahm (4–1)	**Miller** (2–1)	Alvarado (13)	36,653	39–48	L3
88	July 4	Phillies	10–2	**Taillon** (5–4)	Sánchez (6–4)	—	40,143	40–48	W1
89	July 5	Angels	5–1	**Steele** (1–3)	Canning (3–9)	—	36,948	41–48	W2
90	July 6	Angels	0–7	Anderson (8–8)	**Hendricks** (1–7)	—	36,420	41–49	L1
91	July 7	Angels	5–0	**Wesneski** (3–5)	Soriano (4–7)	**Neris** (12)	34,355	42–49	W1
92	July 9	@ Orioles	9–2	**Taillon** (6–4)	Kremer (4–5)	—	30,373	43–49	W2
93	July 10	@ Orioles	4–0	**Imanaga** (8–2)	Burnes (9–4)	—	20,694	44–49	W3
94	July 11	@ Orioles	8–0	**Steele** (2–3)	Suárez (5–3)	—	22,685	45–49	W4
95	July 12	@ Cardinals	5–1	**Hendricks** (2–7)	Gray (9–6)	**Neris** (13)	40,667	46–49	W5
96	July 13 (1)	@ Cardinals	3–11	Lynn (5–4)	**Wesneski** (3–6)	—	39,129	46–50	L1
97	July 13 (2)	@ Cardinals	4–5	Romero (4–1)	**Hodge** (0–1)	Helsley (32)	43,827	46–51	L2
98	July 14	@ Cardinals	8–3	**Taillon** (7–4)	Mikolas (7–8)	—	39,314	47–51	W1
ASG	July 16	NL @ AL	3–5	Miller (1–0)	Greene (0–1)	Clase (1)	39,343	—	ASG
99	July 19	Diamondbacks	2–5	Nelson (7–6)	**Steele** (2–4)	Sewald (14)	40,691	47–52	L1
100	July 20	Diamondbacks	0–3	Gallen (7–5)	**Hendricks** (2–8)	Sewald (15)	39,595	47–53	L2
101	July 21	Diamondbacks	2–1 (10)	**Neris** (8–2)	Mantiply (3–2)	—	39,162	48–53	W1
102	July 22	Brewers	3–1	**Smyly** (3–5)	Myers (6–4)	**Neris** (14)	35,741	49–53	W2
103	July 23	Brewers	0–1	Peguero (6–3)	**Taillon** (7–5)	Megill (20)	37,651	49–54	L1
104	July 24	Brewers	2–3	Junis (3–0)	**Neris** (8–3)	Payamps (5)	37,679	49–55	L2
105	July 26	@ Royals	0–6	Singer (7–6)	**Hendricks** (2–9)	—	36,351	49–56	L3
106	July 27	@ Royals	9–4	**Merryweather** (1–0)	Lugo (12–5)	—	31,784	50–56	W1
107	July 28	@ Royals	7–3	**Assad** (5–3)	Ragans (7–7)	—	24,839	51–56	W2
108	July 29	@ Reds	1–7	Spiers (4–2)	**Taillon** (7–6)	—	21,837	51–57	L1
109	July 30	@ Reds	3–6	Martinez (5–5)	**Steele** (2–5)	Díaz (21)	25,678	51–58	L2
110	July 31	@ Reds	13–4	**Hendricks** (3–9)	Lodolo (8–4)	—	20,733	52–58	W1

August: 18–8 (Home: 9–4; Road: 9–4)

#	Date	Opponent	Score	Win	Loss	Save	Attendance	Record	Streak/ box
111	August 1	Cardinals	5–4	**Pearson** (1–1)	Helsley (4–4)	—	37,969	53–58	W2
112	August 2	Cardinals	6–3	**Miller** (3–1)	Fedde (7–5)	**Neris** (15)	37,613	54–58	W3
113	August 3	Cardinals	4–5	Romero (5–1)	**Neris** (8–4)	Helsley (34)	40,073	54–59	L1
114	August 4	Cardinals	6–2	**Steele** (3–5)	Mikolas (8–9)	—	34,593	55–59	W1
115	August 5	Twins	0–3	Festa (2–2)	**Hendricks** (3–10)	Jax (8)	35,382	55–60	L1
116	August 6	Twins	7–3	**Imanaga** (9–2)	López (10–8)	—	36,653	56–60	W1
117	August 7	Twins	8–2	**López** (2–2)	Richards (2–2)	—	35,059	57–60	W2
118	August 9	@ White Sox	7–6	**Taillon** (8–6)	Crochet (6–9)	**Neris** (16)	38,127	58–60	W3
119	August 10	@ White Sox	3–1	**Hodge** (1–1)	Kuhl (0–2)	**Neris** (17)	38,341	59–60	W4
120	August 12	@ Guardians	8–9	Sandlin (7–0)	**Merryweather** (1–1)	Clase (36)	25,619	59–61	L1
121	August 13	@ Guardians	1–2	Ávila (4–1)	**Smyly** (3–6)	Clase (37)	29,090	59–62	L2
122	August 14	@ Guardians	1–6	Cobb (1–1)	**Taillon** (8–7)	—	30,243	59–63	L3
123	August 16	Blue Jays	6–5 (10)	**Miller** (4–1)	Green (3–3)	—	39,614	60–63	W1
124	August 17	Blue Jays	3–2	**Pearson** (2–1)	Bassitt (9–12)	**López** (3)	38,755	61–63	W2
125	August 18	Blue Jays	0–1	Francis (6–3)	**Imanaga** (9–3)	Green (13)	36,117	61–64	L1
126	August 20	Tigers	3–1	**Assad** (6–3)	Sammons (0–1)	**Hodge** (2)	31,119	62–64	W1
127	August 21	Tigers	2–8	Hurter (1–1)	**Taillon** (8–8)	—	31,940	62–65	L1
128	August 22	Tigers	10–2	**Steele** (4–5)	Maeda (2–6)	—	33,536	63–65	W1
129	August 23	@ Marlins	6–3	**Hodge** (2–1)	de Geus (0–2)	**López** (4)	13,992	64–65	W2
130	August 24	@ Marlins	14–2	**Imanaga** (10–3)	Bellozo (2–2)	—	18,138	65–65	W3
131	August 25	@ Marlins	2–7	Oller (1–1)	**Assad** (6–4)	—	17,275	65–66	L1
132	August 26	@ Pirates	18–8	**Taillon** (9–8)	Keller (11–8)	—	11,936	66–66	W1
133	August 27	@ Pirates	9–5	**Steele** (5–5)	Jones (5–7)	—	13,619	67–66	W2
134	August 28	@ Pirates	14–10	**Hodge** (3–1)	Bednar (3–7)	—	12,660	68–66	W3
135	August 30	@ Nationals	7–6	**Imanaga** (11–3)	Irvin (9–11)	**Thompson** (2)	28,792	69–66	W4
136	August 31	@ Nationals	5–3	**Assad** (7–4)	Herz (2–7)	**Hodge** (3)	32,995	70–66	W5

September: 13–13 (Home: 8–8; Road: 5–5)

#	Date	Opponent	Score	Win	Loss	Save	Attendance	Record	Streak/ box
137	September 1	@ Nationals	14–1	**Wicks** (2–2)	Parker (7–9)	—	31,086	71–66	W6
138	September 2	Pirates	3–5	Beeks (7–4)	**López** (2–3)	Santana (3)	33,583	71–67	L1
139	September 3	Pirates	0–5	Skenes (9–2)	**Hendricks** (3–11)	—	29,450	71–68	L2
140	September 4	Pirates	12–0	**Imanaga** (12–3)	Germán (0–1)	—	30,369	72–68	W1
141	September 6	Yankees	0–3	Gil (13–6)	**Wicks** (2–3)	Weaver (1)	40,101	72–69	L1
142	September 7	Yankees	0–2	Cortés Jr. (9–10)	**Assad** (7–5)	—	40,080	72–70	L2
143	September 8	Yankees	2–1	**Taillon** (10–8)	Cole (6–4)	**Hodge** (4)	39,364	73–70	W1
144	September 9	@ Dodgers	10–4	**Thompson** (2–1)	Buehler (1–5)	—	50,495	74–70	W2
145	September 10	@ Dodgers	6–3	**Imanaga** (13–3)	Phillips (3–1)	**Hodge** (5)	51,923	75–70	W3
146	September 11	@ Dodgers	8–10	Vesia (3–4)	**Armstrong** (3–3)	Kopech (13)	48,691	75–71	L1
147	September 13	@ Rockies	5–9	Vodnik (4–3)	**Smyly** (3–7)	—	38,406	75–72	L2
148	September 14	@ Rockies	5–6 (10)	Kinley (6–1)	**Smyly** (3–8)	—	47,493	75–73	L3
149	September 15	@ Rockies	6–2	**Hendricks** (4–11)	Quantrill (8–10)	**Miller** (1)	40,706	76–73	W1
150	September 16	Athletics	9–2	**Imanaga** (14–3)	Estes (7–8)	—	34,532	77–73	W2
151	September 17	Athletics	3–4	Spence (8–9)	**Wicks** (2–4)	Miller (26)	32,718	77–74	L1
152	September 18	Athletics	3–5	Ferguson (4–2)	**Pearson** (2–2)	Miller (27)	27,806	77–75	L2
153	September 19	Nationals	7–6	**Roberts** (1–0)	Garcia (3–6)	**Hodge** (6)	31,479	78–75	W1
154	September 20	Nationals	3–1	**Taillon** (11–8)	Williams (5–1)	**Hodge** (7)	29,590	79–75	W2
155	September 21	Nationals	1–5	Gore (10–12)	**Hendricks** (4–12)	—	38,819	79–76	L1
156	September 22	Nationals	5–0	**Imanaga** (15–3)	Irvin (10–13)	—	30,086	80–76	W1
157	September 23	@ Phillies	2–6	Nola (13–8)	**Kilian** (0–1)	—	42,386	80–77	L1
158	September 24	@ Phillies	10–4	**Smyly** (4–8)	Banks (2–3)	—	42,033	81–77	W1
159	September 25	@ Phillies	6–9	Ruiz (5–1)	**Assad** (7–6)	—	42,438	81–78	L1
160	September 27	Reds	1–0	**Taillon** (12–8)	Martinez (10–7)	**Hodge** (8)	32,083	82–78	W1
161	September 28	Reds	3–0	**Miller** (5–1)	Farmer (3–2)	**Hodge** (9)	38,180	83–78	W2
162	September 29	Reds	0–3	Santillan (3–3)	**Roberts** (1–1)	Farmer (1)	33,792	83–79	L1

=== Season standings ===
==== National League Central ====
NL Central
Team	W	L	Pct.	GB	Home	Road
Milwaukee Brewers	93	69	.574	—	47‍–‍34	46‍–‍35
St. Louis Cardinals	83	79	.512	10	44‍–‍37	39‍–‍42
Chicago Cubs	83	79	.512	10	44‍–‍37	39‍–‍42
Cincinnati Reds	77	85	.475	16	39‍–‍42	38‍–‍43
Pittsburgh Pirates	76	86	.469	17	39‍–‍42	37‍–‍44

==== National League Wild Card ====
Division leaders
Team	W	L	Pct.
Los Angeles Dodgers	98	64	.605
Philadelphia Phillies	95	67	.586
Milwaukee Brewers	93	69	.574

Wild Card teams (Top 3 teams qualify for postseason)
Team	W	L	Pct.	GB
San Diego Padres	93	69	.574	+4
Atlanta Braves	89	73	.549	—
New York Mets	89	73	.549	—
Arizona Diamondbacks	89	73	.549	—
St. Louis Cardinals	83	79	.512	6
Chicago Cubs	83	79	.512	6
San Francisco Giants	80	82	.494	9
Cincinnati Reds	77	85	.475	12
Pittsburgh Pirates	76	86	.469	13
Washington Nationals	71	91	.438	18
Miami Marlins	62	100	.383	27
Colorado Rockies	61	101	.377	28

==== Record vs. opponents ====
===== Record vs. National League =====
2024 National League record Source: MLB Standings Grid – 2024
Team	AZ	ATL	CHC	CIN	COL	LAD	MIA	MIL	NYM	PHI	PIT	SD	SF	STL	WSH	AL
Arizona	—	2–5	3–3	5–1	9–4	6–7	4–2	4–3	3–4	4–3	4–2	6–7	7–6	3–3	5–1	24–22
Atlanta	5–2	—	4–2	2–4	3–3	2–5	9–4	2–4	7–6	7–6	3–3	3–4	4–3	2–4	5–8	31–15
Chicago	3–3	2–4	—	5–8	4–2	4–2	4–3	5–8	3–4	2–4	7–6	2–4	3–4	6–7	6–1	27–19
Cincinnati	1–5	4–2	8–5	—	6–1	4–3	5–2	4–9	2–4	4–3	5–8	2–4	2–4	7–6	2–4	21–25
Colorado	4–9	3–3	2–4	1–6	—	3–10	2–5	4–3	2–4	2–4	2–4	8–5	3–10	3–4	2–4	20–26
Los Angeles	7–6	5–2	2–4	3–4	10–3	—	5–1	4–3	4–2	1–5	4–2	5–8	9–4	5–2	4–2	30–16
Miami	2–4	4–9	3–4	2–5	5–2	1–5	—	4–2	6–7	6–7	0–7	2–4	3–3	3–3	2–11	19–27
Milwaukee	3–4	4–2	8–5	9–4	3–4	3–4	2–4	—	5–1	2–4	7–6	2–5	4–2	8–5	2–4	31–15
New York	4–3	6–7	4–3	4–2	4–2	2–4	7–6	1–5	—	6–7	5–2	5–2	2–4	4–2	11–2	24–22
Philadelphia	3–4	6–7	4–2	3–4	4–2	5–1	7–6	4–2	7–6	—	3–4	5–1	5–2	4–2	9–4	26–20
Pittsburgh	2–4	3–3	6–7	8–5	4–2	2–4	7–0	6–7	2–5	4–3	—	0–6	2–4	5–8	4–3	20–26
San Diego	7–6	4–3	4–2	4–2	5–8	8–5	4–2	5–2	2–5	1–5	6–0	—	7–6	3–4	6–0	27–19
San Francisco	6–7	3–4	4–3	4–2	10–3	4–9	3–3	2–4	4–2	2–5	4–2	6–7	—	1–5	4–3	23–23
St. Louis	3–3	4–2	7–6	6–7	4–3	2–5	3–3	5–8	2–4	2–4	8–5	4–3	5–1	—	4–3	24–22
Washington	1–5	8–5	1–6	4–2	4–2	2–4	11–2	4–2	2–11	4–9	3–4	0–6	3–4	3–4	—	21–25

Updated with the results of all games through September 30, 2024.

===== Record vs. American League =====
2024 National League record vs. American League Source: MLB Standings
Team	BAL	BOS	CWS	CLE	DET	HOU	KC	LAA	MIN	NYY	OAK	SEA	TB	TEX	TOR
Arizona	1–2	3–0	2–1	3–0	1–2	1–2	2–1	2–1	1–2	1–2	2–1	1–2	0–3	2–2	2–1
Atlanta	1–2	3–1	1–2	2–1	3–0	3–0	2–1	2–1	3–0	2–1	2–1	1–2	2–1	2–1	2–1
Chicago	3–0	1–2	4–0	0–3	2–1	3–0	2–1	2–1	2–1	1–2	1–2	2–1	1–2	1–2	2–1
Cincinnati	0–3	1–2	3–0	1–3	0–3	3–0	0–3	3–0	2–1	3–0	1–2	0–3	1–2	1–2	2–1
Colorado	1–2	2–1	1–2	2–1	1–2	0–4	2–1	2–1	1–2	1–2	1–2	1–2	1–2	3–0	1–2
Los Angeles	2–1	3–0	3–0	2–1	1–2	1–2	2–1	2–2	2–1	2–1	2–1	3–0	2–1	1–2	2–1
Miami	2–1	0–3	2–1	1–2	2–1	0–3	1–2	0–3	2–1	1–2	1–2	2–1	1–3	1–2	3–0
Milwaukee	2–1	2–1	3–0	3–0	2–1	1–2	1–2	2–1	3–1	1–2	2–1	2–1	2–1	3–0	2–1
New York	2–1	3–0	3–0	0–3	1–2	1–2	2–1	1–2	2–1	4–0	1–2	0–3	0–3	2–1	2–1
Philadelphia	1–2	1–2	3–0	1–2	2–1	2–1	2–1	2–1	1–2	0–3	1–2	1–2	3–0	3–0	3–1
Pittsburgh	2–1	0–3	3–0	1–2	2–2	2–1	1–2	1–2	2–1	2–1	0–3	2–1	1–2	1–2	1–2
San Diego	2–1	2–1	3–0	2–1	2–1	2–1	2–1	0–3	2–1	1–2	3–0	1–3	2–1	2–1	1–2
San Francisco	2–1	1–2	2–1	1–2	2–1	2–1	3–0	1–2	2–1	0–3	2–2	1–2	1–2	2–1	1–2
St. Louis	3–0	2–1	1–2	2–1	1–2	1–2	1–3	2–1	2–1	2–1	2–1	1–2	2–1	2–1	0–3
Washington	2–2	1–2	1–2	1–2	2–1	2–1	0–3	2–1	1–2	2–1	1–2	2–1	1–2	1–2	2–1

Updated with the results of all games through September 30, 2024.

=== Season summary ===
==== March ====
- **March 9** – The Cubs announced that Justin Steele would be the Opening Day starting pitcher.
- **March 28** – The Cubs opened the season on the road against the defending World Series champion Texas Rangers. Justin Steele allowed one run in 4.2 innings and left with what was termed as left hamstring tightness. With the game tied at two in the top of the ninth, newly acquired Michael Busch scored from second on a wild pitch that replays showed was a foul ball. Adbert Alzolay gave up a tying homer in the bottom of the ninth to send the game to extra innings. In the 10th, Jonah Heim singled in the winning run for the Rangers as the Cubs lost 4–3. Steele was later placed on the injured list and was expected to miss at least a month.
- **March 30** – After a scheduled off day, the Cubs took an early lead off a two-run home run by Dansby Swanson in the second, but Kyle Hendricks surrendered five runs in 3.2 innings of work. Ben Brown gave up six runs in 1.2 innings as the Cubs were blown out by the Rangers 11–2.
- **March 31** – In the finale of the opening series on Easter, Christopher Morel hit a three-run home run in the first to give the Cubs an early lead. Jordan Wicks surrendered the lead twice, allowing five runs in four innings. However, the Cub bullpen held the Rangers scoreless in five innings. With the game tied at five in the ninth, Ian Happ, who had four hits on the day, took a bases loaded walk to give the Cubs a one-run lead. Seiya Suzuki followed with a two-RBI single as the Cubs beat the Rangers 9–5 to start the season 1–2.

==== April ====
- **April 1** – A day later, the Cubs opened the home portion of the regular season against the Colorado Rockies at Wrigley Field. Shōta Imanaga made his major league debut and threw six shutout innings while allowing only two hits and striking out nine. However, the game remained scoreless until the bottom of the sixth when Christopher Morel singled to left with runners on first and second. Rockie outfielder Nolan Jones missed the ground ball, allowing the ball to roll to the wall. Two runs scored on the play and a bad throw by Jones allowed Morel to come all the way around for a 3–0 lead. A Cody Bellinger two-run single in the seventh finished the scoring as the Cubs won 5–0.
- **April 2** – In game two of the series against the Rockies, Javier Assad threw six scoreless innings. Meanwhile, the Cub offense pounded out 12 runs and 14 hits including home runs by Seiya Suzuki, Christopher Morel, Garrett Cooper, and Cody Bellinger. The 12–2 win moved the Cubs to 3–2 on the season.
- **April 3** – In the finale of the series against the Rockies, Luke Little was used as an opener and pitched a scoreless first inning. Ben Brown pitched four innings in relief while allowing only one run. Meanwhile, the Cubs jumped to an 8–2 lead on a homer by Seiya Suzuki as well as a bases-clearing single for Miguel Amaya. However, the Cub bullpen allowed five run in the eighth to allow the Rockies to tie the game. In the bottom of the eighth, Miles Mastrobuoni reached on a dropped third strike and Suzuki drove in the go-ahead run on a fielder's choice. Adbert Alzolay pitched the ninth to secure the Cubs' fourth straight win.
- **April 5** – After a scheduled off day, the Cubs faced the Los Angeles Dodgers at Wrigley. Kyle Hendricks allowed five runs in four innings, but left with a 6–5 lead behind home runs by Dansby Swanson and Michael Busch. Seiya Suzuki drove in three runs while Ian Happ hit a two-run triple to give the Cubs a 9–5 lead. The Cub bullpen allowed two runs and Adbert Alzolay earned his first save as the Cubs won 9–7.
- **April 6** – In game two against the Dodgers, Jordan Wicks allowed two runs in 4.2 innings. The cub bullpen allowed two runs, only one earned. However, the Cub offense only scored one run as the Cubs lost 4–1.
- **April 7** – In the series finale, Michael Busch drove in three runs with a bases clearing double in the first. Mike Tauchman drove in another run with a double as the Cubs took the early lead. The game was halted by rain in the bottom of the fourth with the Cubs ahead 7–0. After an almost three hour rain delay, Cody Bellinger hit a solo home run as the Cubs won 8–1. Shōta Imanaga threw four scoreless innings before the rain delay to continue his scoreless start to his major league career. The win moved the Cubs to 6–3 on the season.
- **April 8** – The Cubs next traveled to San Diego to face the Padres. The Cubs started well, jumping to an 8–0 lead through five innings. Ian Happ and Cody Bellinger drove in two runs each on singles in the second. Bellinger drove in a third run and Dansby Swanson tripled in a run to give the Cubs the 8–0 lead. However, Jaiver Assad and two Cub relievers allowed seven runs to the Padres in the sixth. Adbert Alzolay gave up a two-run homer to Fernando Tatís Jr. in the bottom of the eighth as the Cubs lost 9–8.
- **April 9** – Rookie Ben Brown got the start for the Cubs and pitched 4.2 scoreless innings. Yan Gomes hit his first homer of the season in the fifth and three batters later, Christopher Morel hit his first career grand slam. The Cub bullpen allowed only one run as the Cubs beat the Padres 5–1.
- **April 10** – Kyle Hendricks allowed seven runs in five innings as the Cubs lost to the Padres 10–2. Michael Busch hit a two-run home run to tally the Cubs only runs of the game. The loss moved the Cubs to 7–5 on the season.
- **April 12** – The Cubs continued their West Coast road trip with a visit to Seattle to face the Mariners. Jordan Wicks allowed four runs in four innings. Michael Busch homered for the second consecutive game, but it was not enough as the Cubs lost 4–2.
- **April 13** – In game two of the series against the Mariners, Miguel Amaya and Seiya Suzuki homered. Michael Busch also homered, for the third straight game, as the Cubs won 4–1. Shōta Imanaga pitched 5.1 innings without allowing an earned run in the win.
- **April 14** – Michael Busch homered for the fourth consecutive game while Javier Assad allowed only two runs in 5.2 innings. The Mariners had runners in scoring position in the seventh and eighth, but could not score. Adbert Alzolay picked Julio Rodríguez off of first with two outs in the bottom of the ninth to end the game and notch his third save of the year in the 3–2 win.
- **April 15** – After receiving news that Seiya Suzuki would miss a month with an oblique injury, Michael Busch homered for the fifth straight game while Ben Brown allowed only one run in six innings of work. However, the game against the Diamondbacks in Arizona remained tied into the eighth before the D-Backs took the 2–1 lead. In the top of ninth, Nico Hoerner scored from second on a wild pitch to tie the game at two. In the 11th, Hoerner singled in the go-ahead run while Keegan Thompson pitched two scoreless innings to give the Cubs the 3–2 win.
- **April 16** – In the second game against the Diamondbacks, Kyle Hendricks allowed 7 runs in 4.1 innings, blowing a three-run lead. The Cubs rallied to score six runs in the seventh, including Ian Happ's first homer of the year, a grand slam, to take an 11–8 lead. However, the Diamondbacks scored a run in the seventh, eighth, and ninth innings to tie the game and force extra innings. Drew Smyly allowed a base hit to the first batter in the 10th to give the Diamondbacks the 12–11 win.
- **April 17** – In the finale of the nine-game road trip, Jordan Wicks allowed two runs in 4.1 innings. Newly recalled Hayden Wesneski pitched four innings of scoreless relief as the Cubs beat the Diamondbacks 5–3. Cody Bellinger homered while Mike Tauchman, Yan Gomes, and Michael Busch each drove in a run in the win. The win moved the Cubs to 11–7 on the season, finishing the road trip at 5–4.
- **April 19** – After a rainout, the Cubs returned home to play the Miami Marlins at Wrigley Field. In his first appearance of the year after returning from an injury, Jameson Taillon allowed only one run in five innings. Miguel Amaya drove in two runs while six other Cubs drove in a run in the 8–3 Cub win.
- **April 20** – In the first game of a doubleheader, Javier Assad allowed one run in 4.2 innings of work. Patrick Wisdom drove in two runs while three Cub relievers kept the 2–1 Cub lead. Adbert Alzolay got the final out of the eighth, but gave up a go-ahead two-run homer in the top of the ninth as the Cubs lost to the Marlins 3–2. It was Alzolay's fourth blown save of the season. In game two of the doubleheader, Shōta Imanaga gave up his first earned runs of the season, but the Cubs scored four times in the bottom of the sixth that resulted in a 5–3 win over the Marlins. Cody Bellinger and Alexander Canario homered in the win. Héctor Neris pitched a scoreless ninth for the save.
- **April 21** – In the finale of the series against the Marlins, Kyle Hendricks continued to struggle, allowing four runs in four innings. Nico Hoerner had three hits and drove in two runs, but the Cub bullpen surrendered two more runs. As a result, the Cubs lost 6–3.
- **April 23** – After a scheduled off day, the Cubs faced the Houston Astros at Wrigley. Jordan Wicks allowed only two runs in six innings of work while the Cub bullpen held the Astros scoreless. Cody Bellinger hit a two-run homer in the first and Mike Tauchman homered twice, including a three-run shot in the first, as the Cubs won easily 7–2. Bellinger did leave the game later with a rib injury after running into the wall. The win moved the Cubs to 14–9 on the season.
- **April 24** – After finding out Cody Bellinger would be placed on the injured list with a broken rib, the Cubs took an early 4–0 lead on a Michael Busch sacrifice fly and Dansby Swanson three-run homer in the first. Jameson Taillon and four Cub relievers allowed three runs, but were able to hold on to beat the Astros 4–3.
- **April 25** – In the finale of the series against the Astros, Pete Crow-Armstrong, called up due to Cody Bellinger's injury, got his first major league hit – a two-run home run in the sixth to give the Cubs the 3–1 win. Javier Assad allowed one run in 5.2 innings. Hayden Wesneski shut out the Astros in 2.1 innings of relief while Héctor Neris pitched the ninth for a second consecutive save. The win moved the Cubs to 16–9 on the season.
- **April 26** – The Cubs returned to the road to face the Red Sox in Boston. Shōta Imanaga allowed only one run in 6.1 innings while reliever Keegan Thompson shut out the Sox in 2.1 innings of relief. Patrick Wisdom had a pinch-hit two-run double while Pete Crow-Armstrong drove in two more runs as the Cubs won easily 7–1.
- **April 27** – In game two against the Red Sox, Jordan Wicks was sent to the injured list instead of making the start. Ben Brown made the spot start and allowed three runs in 3.2 innings. Two Cub relievers allowed eight more runs which led to Matt Mervis pitching the eighth and allowing six more runs. The Cubs were blown out 17–0.
- **April 28** – In the finale against the Red Sox, the Cubs trailed 4–0 in the seventh before Matt Mervis drove in the first Cub run of the game. Mike Tauchman tied the game with a three-run homer in the eighth, but Mark Leiter Jr. walked one and allowed to hits without getting an out in the bottom of the ninth as the Red Sox won 5–4.
- **April 29** – The Cubs next traveled to face the New York Mets. Jameson Taillon continued his strong start to the season pitching 7.1 innings and allowing only one run. However, the Cubs were held without a hit until the eighth before Nick Madrigal drove in the tying run on a fielder's choice. In the ninth, Christopher Morel hit a two-run homer to give the Cubs the 3–1 win as the Cubs moved to 18–11 on the season and into sole possession of first place in the Central division.
- **April 30** – Javier Assad allowed two runs, both unearned, in five plus innings and Adbert Alzolay gave up a three-run homer as the Cubs lost to the Mets 4–2.

==== May ====
- **May 1** – Shōta Imanaga continued his strong start, pitching seven scoreless innings while three Cub relievers also shut out the Mets. A sacrifice fly by Pete Crow-Armstrong in the fifth gave the Cubs the 1–0 lead. With the score the same in the bottom of the ninth, Hector Neris hit a batter and gave up a double to put runners at second and third with only one out. On the next play, a fly ball to left field was caught by Ian Happ for the second. The runner at third, Pete Alonso, tried to score on the play, but Happ threw to Nick Madrigal who threw Alonso out at home for the double play to end the game. A review of the play upheld the call to give the Cubs the win.
- **May 2** – In the finale of the four-game series against the Mets, the Cubs took an early four-run lead, but the Mets tied it at five in the sixth. Neither team scored again until the 11th when Nick Madrigal drove in the go-ahead run. Daniel Palencia hit the first batter of the 11th before Francisco Lindor doubled in both runs to give the Mets the 7–6 win. The loss dropped the Cubs to 19–13 on the season.
- **May 3** – The Cubs returned home to face the division-leading Milwaukee Brewers. Hayden Wesneski got the start and held the Brewers scoreless for 6.1 innings. Adbert Alzolay continued to struggle, surrendering three runs in one-third of ainning. A Christopher Morel homer was the only run for the Cubs as they lost 3–1.
- **May 4** – Jameson Taillon pitched six scoreless innings while allowing only two infield hits to the Brewers. Nico Hoerner hit his first home run of the season while Christopher Morel and Patrick Wisdom homered as well to give the Cubs a 5–0 lead. Keegan Thompson failed to get an out in the seventh and allowed four runs to narrow the Cub lead to 5–4. Wisdom drove in his second run of the game with a single in the eighth and Hector Neris allowed a run before getting the final out as the Cubs won 6–5.
- **May 5** – Javier Assad pitched six scoreless innings to continue his strong start to the season. Nico Hoerner drove in two runs with a double and scored on a wild pitch to give the Cubs a 3–0 lead over the Brewers. Dansby Swanson made two great defensive plays to keep the Brewers scoreless and homered to push the lead to four. A Christopher Morel single put the lead to five before Yency Almonte and Daniel Palencia pitched three scoreless innings of relief for the 5–0 win. The win put the Cubs in a virtual tie with the Brewers for the division lead.
- **May 6** – Justin Steele came off the injured list to face the Padres at Wrigley. Steele pitched 4.2 scoreless innings before the Cub bullpen surrendered six runs in the top of the sixth. Christopher Morel hit a two-run homer in the bottom of the sixth and Yan Gomes added a solo shot in the seventh, but it was not enough as the Cubs lost 6–3.
- **May 7** – In the second game of the series against the Padres, Cody Bellinger came off the injured list and hit a solo home run in the fourth. Shōta Imanaga pitched seven scoreless innings before giving up a two-run homer and the lead in the eighth. In the bottom of the eighth, Christopher Morel drove in the tying run on a sacrifice fly. Tied at two in the bottom of the ninth with rain starting to fall, Michael Busch hit a home run on the first pitch of the inning to give the Cubs the walk-off win 3–2.
- **May 8** – Hayden Wesneski got the start for the Cubs and surrendered three runs in six-plus innings. However, former Cub prospect Dylan Cease and two Padre relievers shut out the Cubs as they lost 3–0.
- **May 10** – After an off day, the Cubs traveled to Pittsburgh to face the Pirates. Javier Assad allowed only one earned in run in 4.1 innings while Ben Brown pitched 3.2 scoreless innings of relief. Cody Bellinger had four hits including a home run and drove in a run. Nick Madrigal drove in two runs as the Cubs won easily 7–2.
- **May 11** – In game two against the Pirates, the number one pick from the 2023 draft, Paul Skenes, made his MLB debut for the Pirates. He struck out seven batters in four-plus innings and left with a 6–1 lead. However, Pirate relief pitchers walked four batters with the bases loaded to bring the Cubs with in on at 6–5. After an infield single by Mike Tauchman tied the game, the game was delayed for 2 plus hours due to rain. Upon resumption of the game, Pirate pitching walked two more batters with the bases loaded to give the Cubs and 8–6 lead. However, Keegan Thompson allowed a three-run homer in the bottom of the fifth to surrender the lead. The fifth home run of the day for the Pirates put the lead at 10–8 in the sixth. The Cubs narrowed the lead to one in the ninth, but lost 10–9. Justin Steel returned from the injured list to make the start for the Cubs, but allowed six runs in four innings.
- **May 12** – In the finale of the series against the Pirates, the Cubs took a 2–0 lead in the first on a Christopher Morel home run. Kyle Hendricks returned from the injured list and allowed only one run in five innings. However, the Pirates tied it in the sixth and the game went to extra innings. In the 10th, Codey Bellinger singled in the Manfred runner, but was thrown out at second on the play. Patrick Wisdom followed with a home run before Mike Tauchman scored on a passed ball to give the Cubs a 5–2 lead. Adbert Alzolay gave up a two-run homer to the first batter in the bottom of the 10th, but held on for the 5–4 win.
- **May 13** – The Cubs next faced the Atlanta Braves in Atlanta. Shōta Imanaga pitched five scoreless innings while allowing seven hits. Hayden Wesneski allowed two runs in three innings of relief as the Cubs were shut out 2–0.
- **May 14** – Jameson Taillon allowed seven runs, only two earned, though he committed the error leading to the unearned runs. The Cubs were once again shut out by the Braves, losing 7–0.
- **May 15** – In the final game against the Braves, Javier Assad lowered his season ERA to 1.49 by pitching six scoreless innings. Mike Tauchman and Seiya Suzuki homered for the Cubs while Pete Crow-Armstrong tripled and drove in two runs, one on a bunt single. The Cub bullpen only allowed one run as the Cubs avoided the sweep with a 7–1 win. The win moved the Cubs to 25–19 on the season, 1.5 games behind the division-leading Brewers.
- **May 16** – Justin Steele allowed five runs, four earned in 5.2 innings of work against the Pirates. Ian Happ homered for the Cubs as they lost 5–4 at Wrigley.
- **May 17** – Again facing Paul Skenes, the Cubs went hitless in his six innings of work. Meanwhile, Kyle Hendricks allows eight run 4.2 innings as the Cubs lost to the Pirates 9–3.
- **May 18** – Shōta Imonaga pitched seven scoreless innings, but the game remained tied in the bottom of the ninth. Cody Bellinger doubled before Christopher Morel singled to score Bellinger on a play at the plate that was reviewed, but the call stood as the Cubs beat the Pirates 1–0.
- **May 19** – Jameson Taillon allowed three runs in 4.2 innings while the Cub offense managed only two runs against the Pirates in the 3–2 loss.
- **May 21** – After an off day, the Braves visited Wrigley Field for a three-game series. Dansby Swanson returned from the injured list and had two hits and a run scored. Jaiver Assad gave up three runs, two earned, in just 4.1 innings of work. However, the Cub bullpen kept the Braves scoreless. Mike Tauchman drove in two runs, including the tying run in the sixth. The game went to extra innings and Nico Hoerner, playing for the first time after missing five games with a hamstring injury, hit an infield single to score the Manfred runner in the 10th. The 4–3 win moved the Cubs to 27–22 on the season, 1.5 games behind the Brewers in the division.
- **May 22** – In game two against the Braves, Justin Steele left in the sixth with the Cubs trailing 3–1. Jose Cuas allowed two home runs in the inning in relief of Steels as the lead ballooned to 8–1. Max Fried pitched a complete game for the Braves while surrendering only two runs and three hits in the 9–2 Cubs' loss.
- **May 23** – In the finale of the series and homestand, Ben Brown got the start with Kyle Hendricks moving to the bullpen after his poor start to the season. Brown pitched four scoreless innings to start the game. Hayden Wesneski allowed a solo home run in relief and Hendricks allowed two runs in his second ever relief appearance as the Cubs lost 3–0.
- **May 25** – After a rainout the prior day, the Cubs faced the Cardinals at Busch Stadium. Jameson Taillon allowed three runs in 5.2 innings, but left with the game tied at three. Patrick Wisdom doubled in a run in the seventh to give the Cubs a 4–3 lead, but Mark Leiter Jr. allowed four runs in the eighth as the Cubs lost 7–6.
- **May 26** – After a two and a half hour rain delay, Javier Assad allowed four runs on two, two-run Paul Goldschmidt homers. Ian Happ also homered twice, a two-run homer in the seventh and a solo shot in the ninth, but it was not enough as the Cubs lost their fourth game in a row 4–3.
- **May 27** – The Cubs next traveled to face the Brewers in Milwaukee. Justin Steele pitched seven scoreless innings before the bullpen surrendered five runs in the eighth. The Cub offense continued to struggle, pushing only one run across as the Cubs lost 5–1. The loss dropped the Cubs to 27–27 on the season.
- **May 28** – In game two of the series against the Brewers, Ben Brown pitched seven no-hit innings before leaving with a 1–0 lead. Hayden Wesneski allowed a hit in the eighth, but the Cubs still led 1–0 in the ninth before the Brewers tied it to force extra innings. In the 10th, rookie Luis Vázquez scored from second when Mike Tauchman singled off reliever Trevor Megill's arm. Cody Bellinger and Michael Busch each singled to drive in a run in the inning while Ian Happ doubled to score two and give the Cubs a 6–1 advantage. Luke Little allowed two runs in the bottom of the 10th, but the Cubs held on for the 6–3 win.
- **May 29** – Shōta Imanaga has his first poor start of the season, allowing seven runs in 4.1 innings. Kyle Hendricks allowed three more runs in relief. Ian Happ homered and drove in two runs as the Cubs scored six runs for the second consecutive game. However, it was not enough as the Cubs lost to the Brewers 10–6 and moved back to .500 on the season.
- **May 30** – Jameson Taillon allowed three runs in six innings of work. With the Cubs trailing 3–1 in the seventh, Seiya Suzuki hit a pinch-hit, two-run home run to tie the game at three. After allowing a run in the bottom of the seventh, Christopher Morel homered in the eighth to tie the game at four. However, Tyson Miller allowed a two-run homer in the bottom of the eighth as the Cubs lost to the Brewers 6–4. The loss dropped the Cubs to 28–29 on the season.
- **May 31** – Javier Assad allowed two runs in 5.1 innings against the Cincinnati Reds at Wrigley and left with a 3–2 lead. However, Drew Smyly allowed a two-run homer in the seventh to give the Reds a 4–3 lead. Ian Happ homered and drove in three runs in the game, but it was not enough as the Cubs lost again 5–4. The loss dropped the Cubs to 28–30 on the season and left them 7.5 games behind the Brewers in the division.

==== June ====
- **June 1** – After a three and a half hour rain delay, Justin Steele allowed five runs, only one earned in five innings. Seiya Suzuki dropped an easy fly ball with the bases loaded in the second inning for an error that allowed three runs to score. He redeemed himself with a grand slam in the bottom of the second to tie the game at four. Dansby Swanson hit a two-run home run in the eighth to give the Cubs the 7–5 win.
- **June 2** – In the finale of the series against the Reds, Ben Brown allowed five runs in five innings. The Cubs managed single runs in the fifth and the sixth, but lost 5–2. The lost dropped the Cubs back to two games under .500 on the season.
- **June 4** – After a scheduled off day, Shōta Imonaga allowed five runs, only one earned, to the crosstown Chicago White Sox before the game was delayed by rain. Trailing 5–0, Dansby Swanson drove in a run in the fifth before Christopher Morel and Patrick Wisdom each hit two-run home runs in the sixth to tie the game at five. Hayden Wesneski allowed a home run in the seventh to put the Cubs behind by a run. In the bottom of the eighth, Ian Happ doubled in two runs to give the Cubs the 7–6 win.
- **June 5** – For the second consecutive day, the Cubs fell behind 5–1 before the Cubs tied it in the seventh on a Cody Bellinger sacrifice fly. Ian Happ drove in the go-ahead run later in the inning. However, Hayden Wesneski allowed a home run for the second consecutive game to tie the game at six in the eighth. In the bottom of the ninth, Mike Tauchman hit a walk-off homer to give the Cubs another 7–6 win over the White Sox.
- **June 6** – The Cubs next travelled to face the Reds in Cincinnati. Javier Assad allowed five runs in 5.2 innings while the Cub bullpen allowed three more runs. Seiya Suzuki and Christopher Morel each hit two-run homers, but it was not enough as the Cubs lost 8–4.
- **June 7** – Justin Steele allowed three runs in seven innings, but the Cubs only managed two runs on a Dansby Swanson solo home run and a Miguel Amaya double. As a result, the Cubs lost their third game in a row, losing to the Reds 3–2.
- **June 8** – Dansby Swanson doubled in the first to give the Cubs a 1–0 lead. Ben Brown allowed three runs in four innings and Jordan Wicks, coming off the IL, allowed one run in 3.1 innings of work. A Yan Gomes double in the sixth and a Pete Crow-Armstrong groundout in the eighth drew the Cubs within one run, but they couldn't tie the game as they lost to the Reds 4–3. The loss dropped the Cubs to 31–34 on the season and to last place in the division.
- **June 9** – In the finale of the four-game series against the Reds, Ian Happ doubled with the bases loaded in the first to give the Cubs a 3–0 lead. Mike Tauchman doubled in a run in the second to push the Cub lead to 4–0. Shōta Imanaga allowed two runs in 6.2 innings and the Cub bullpen shut out the Reds to avoid the sweep. The Cubs won 4–2.
- **June 11** – After an off day, Jameson Taillon pitched six scoreless innings against the Tampa Bay Rays in Tampa. Christopher Morel homered and David Bote drove in a run to give the Cubs a 2–0 lead. Leading by one in the ninth, Hector Neris allowed a single to tie the game at two. A batter later, Neris gave up a walk-off three-run homer to Brandon Lowe as the Cubs lost 5–2.
- **June 12** – Javier Assad allowed two runs in 4.2 innings against the Rays. Cody Bellinger hit a three run homer in the seventh to give the Cubs a 4–2 lead. Hector Neris struggled again in the ninth, allowing a solo homer before giving up a single and a walk to put the winning run on base. However, he got a fly ball to end the game as the Cubs won 4–3.
- **June 13** – Justin Steel pitched six scoreless innings and left with a 2–0 lead before Mark Leiter Jr. allowed three runs in the seventh to surrender the lead. The Cubs could manage no more runs and lost 3–2.
- **June 14** – Returning home to face the Cardinals, Jordan Wicks made his first start since returning from the IL. However, Wicks left after 1.2 with another injury. The Cub bullpen held the Cardinals scoreless until the eighth. The Cub offense failed to score again as the Cubs lost 3–0.
- **June 15** – In game two against the Cardinals, Shōta Imanaga allowed only one run in seven innings. Ahead 2–1 in the seventh, Ian Happ hit a three-run homer to give the Cubs some breathing room and a 5–1 win.
- **June 16** – In the finale of the three-game series, Jameson Taillon allowed two runs in six innings. The Cub bullpen held the Cardinals scoreless, but the Cubs only managed a Michael Busch solo homer in the seventh as they lost 2–1.
- **June 17** – The San Francisco Giants next came to town to face the Cubs. Javier Assad allowed only one run in five innings, but left trailing 1–0. Michael Busch homered for the second consecutive game, a two-run shot, to give the Cubs a 2–1 lead. Hayden Wesneski surrendered the lead in the seventh before Seiya Suzuki tied the game at three with a double in the seventh. Ian Happ followed with a three-run homer to give the Cubs a 6–3 lead. Mark Leiter Jr. allowed a run in the eighth, but the Cubs took a two-run lead into the ninth. However, Hector Neris allowed a three-run homer to surrender the lead in the ninth as the Cubs lost 7–6.
- **June 18** – In the second game against the Giants, Justin Steele allowed two runs in 6.2 innings of work and left the game with the score tied at two on a Dansby Swanson two-run homer. With the game still tied at two in the eighth, Cody Bellinger, Ian Happ, and Christopher Morel each hit run-scoring singles to give the Cubs a 5–2 win.
- **June 19** – Kyle Hendricks made his first start since May and allowed one run in 5.2 innings against the Giants. Dansby Swanson and Ian Happ hit back-to-back homers in the fourth and the Cubs pushed the lead to 6–1 in the seventh. Tyson Miller gave up a grand slam in the eighth after Mark Leiter Jr. had gotten into a bases load jam to narrow the lead to one. However, the Cubs were able to hold on for the 6–5 win.
- **June 21** – After an off day, the Mets came to Wrigley for a three-game series. Shōta Imanaga allowed 10 runs in three innings as the Cubs were blown out 11–1.
- **June 22** – In game two, Jameson Taillon scatter six hits over seven innings while allowing only one run. Christopher Morel homered and drove in two runs as the Cubs beat the Mets easily 8–1.
- **June 23** – Javier Assad allowed four runs in 4.1 innings as the Cub offense managed only two runs on a Christopher Morel two-run homer. Despite Mets reliever Edwin Díaz being ejected in ninth due to a sticky substance on his hands, the Cubs lost 5–2.
- **June 24** – The Cubs next travelled to San Francisco to face the Giants again. The Cubs jumped to an early 4–0 lead while Justin Steele allowed two runs in 7.1 innings. Leading 4–2 in the ninth, the Cubs allowed sacrifice flies to tie the game at two. An intentional walk to load the bases preceded an unintentional walk to score the winning run as the Cubs lost 5–4.
- **June 25** – Kyle Hendricks pitched well again, allowing only two runs in seven innings. However, the Cub offense only scored one run while Colten Brewer allowed three runs in the eighth as the Cubs lost to the Giants 5–1.
- **June 26** – In game three against the Giants, Hayden Wesneski got the start and allowed three runs in four innings. Drew Smyly allowed one run in 1.1 innings of relief, as the Cubs only scored three, losing 4–3, their fourth loss in a row.
- **June 27** – Shōta Imanaga allowed three runs in six innings and left the game tied at three. In the 10th, Ian Happ hit a two-run homer as the Cubs beat the Giants 5–3.
- **June 28** – Facing the division-leading Brewers in Milwaukee, Jameson Taillon allowed a grand slam in fourth as the Cubs lost 4–2.
- **June 29** – In game two against the Brewers, the Cubs took a 2–0 lead on a Michael Busch homer in the first. Justin Steele allowed three runs in seven innings and left with the game tied at three. Ian Happ hit a two-run homer in the eighth to give the Cubs the 5–3 win.
- **June 30** – Kyle Hendricks allowed seven runs, including the second grand slam of the series, as the Cubs were blown out by the Brewers 7–1.

==== July ====
- **July 2** – After a scheduled off day, the Cubs returned home to face the Phillies. Hayden Wesneski allowed five runs in five innings. Meanwhile, the Cubs were limited to only one run through eight innings. In the ninth, trailing 6–1, Seiya Suzuki hit a three-run home run to narrow the lead. It was not enough, as the Cubs lost 6–4.
- **July 3** – Shōta Imanaga allowed three runs in six innings. The Cubs tied the game at three in the seventh on a Cody Bellinger RBI single. However, Tyson Miller surrendered a homer in the eighth as the Cubs lost to the Phillies 5–3.
- **July 4** – In the finale against the Phillies, Ian Happ hit two three-run homers, one from each side of the plate, driving in a career-high six runs as the Cubs beat the Phillies easily, 10–2. David Bote also homered for the Cubs in the win.
- **July 5** – Justin Steele allowed two hits and one run while pitching his first career complete game against the Los Angeles Angels. Seiya Suzuki hit a two-run homer and Ian Happ drove in two runs as the Cubs won 5–1.
- **July 6** – In game two against the Angels, Kyle Hendricks allowed two runs while the Cub bullpen allowed five more. The Cub offense was held without a run as they lost 7–0.
- **July 7** – Hayden Wesneski allowed only one run in 6.1 innings as the Cubs shut out the Angels 5–0. Michael Busch homered and drove in three runs in the win.
- **July 9** – After a scheduled off day, the Cubs traveled to face the first-place Orioles in Baltimore. Michael Busch homered in the first to give the Cubs the early lead. The Cubs pushed the lead to 4–1 in the third before Ian Happ hit a three-run homer in the fourth to give the Cubs a 7–2 lead. The Cubs added two more to beat the Orioles 9–2. The win was the Cubs second in a row and fourth in the prior five games.
- **July 10** – In game two of the series against the Orioles, Shōta Imanaga pitched six scoreless innings. Christopher Morel homered and the Cub bullpen finished the shutout of the Orioles as the Cubs won 4–2.
- **July 11** – Justin Steele pitched seven shutout innings while Seiya Suzuki drove in three runs on two doubles and a triple. Dansby Swanson homered and drove in two runs while Michael Bush also drove in two runs. The Cubs won easily 8–0 to sweep the Orioles, marking the fourth win in a row for the Cubs.
- **July 12** – The Cubs traveled to St. Louis to face the Cardinals in the final series before the All-Star break. Kyle Hendricks pitched seven scoreless innings while David Bote and Nico Hoerner drove in two runs each as the Cubs won 5–1.
- **July 13** – In game one of a doubleheader against the Cardinals, Hayden Wesneski allow nine runs in the first inning and 11 runs total in four innings as the Cubs were blown out 11–3. The loss snapped the Cubs five-game winning streak. In game two of the doubleheader, Javier Assad returned from the injured list and allowed three runs in 2.1 innings of work. Three Cub relievers shut out the Cardinals until the eighth when Porter Hodge allowed two runs as the Cubs lost 5–4. Miguel Amaya homered and drove in two in the loss.
- **July 14** – In the final game of the All-Star break, Pete Crow-Armstrong and Christopher Morel each hit two home runs while Ian Happ and Tomás Nido also homered as the Cubs won easily 8–3. Jameson Taillon allowed three runs in 5.2 innings as the Cubs finished the first half of the season winning eight of the prior 11. They finished the first half in last place in the Central division, 8.5 games behind division-leading Milwaukee.
- **July 19** – After the All-Star break, Justin Steele gave up five runs in 4.2 innings of work against the Diamondbacks at Wrigley. The Cubs could only manage two runs as they lost 5–2.
- **July 20** – In game two against the Diamondbacks, Kyle Hendricks allowed three runs in five innings as the Cubs were shut out 3–0. The loss dropped the cubs eight games under .500 on the season.
- **July 21** – Shōta Imanaga allowed only one run on two hits in seven innings, but left the game with the Cubs trailing the Diamondbacks 1–0. Seiya Suzuki tied the game with a single in the ninth and Nico Hoerner drew a bases loaded walk in the 10th to give the Cubs the 2–1 win.
- **July 22** – The Cubs next faced the division-leading Brewers at Wrigley Field. Javier Assad and three relievers combined to hold the Brewers scoreless until Porter Hodge allowed a homer in the eighth. Ian Happ homered and Michael Busch drove in a run while Hector Neris pitched a scoreless ninth as the Cubs defeated the Brewers 3–1.
- **July 23** – After the start of the game was delayed for almost 90 minutes by rain, Jameson Taillon pitched seven scoreless innings and the game remained tied heading in to the eighth. After allowing singles to the first two batters in the eighth, Taillon was lifted and Julian Merryweather allowed a run-scoring single to give the Brewers a 1–0 lead. The Cubs loaded the bases in the eighth, but could not push across a run in eighth or ninth as the Cubs lost 1–0.
- **July 24** – In the finale of the series against the Brewers, Justin Steele allowed two runs in 5.1 innings of work. An Ian Happ single and Seiya Suzuki solo home run left the game tied at two. In the ninth, Hector Neris allowed an RBI double by William Contreras as the Cubs lost 3–2.
- **July 26** – After a scheduled off day, the Cubs traveled to Kansas City to face the Royals. Kyle Hendricks allowed six runs in five innings as the Cubs were shut out 6–0.
- **July 27** – In game two of the series against the Royals, Shōta Imanaga allowed three runs in 5.2 innings of work, but Julian Merryweather allowed a two-run scoring single to surrender the lead. Trailing 4–3 in the seventh, Patrick Wisdom hit a pinch-hit grand slam to give the Cubs the 7–4 lead. the Cubs added two more runs in the ninth to secure a 9–4 win.
- **July 28** – Javier Assad pitched six innings while allowing only three runs against the Royals. Patrick Wisdom homered again while Nico Hoerner drove in two runs as the Cubs won 7–3. During the game, Christopher Morel was pulled from the lineup after being traded to the Tampa Bay Rays.
- **July 29** – The Cubs travelled to Cincinnati to face the Reds. Jameson Tailon gave up six runs in 4.1 innings as the Cubs were blown out 7–1.
- **July 30** – Justin Steele gave up five runs in five innings. Cody Bellinger, returning from a broken finger, homered and drove in two, but it was not enough as the Cubs lost to the Reds 6–3.
- **July 31** – In the finale of the series against the Reds, the Cubs scored 13 runs on 17 hits, nine of which were doubles, as the blew out the Reds 13–4. Ian Happ homered and drove in two while Seiya Suzuki drove in three. Three other Cubs also drove in two runs in the easy win. Kyle Hendricks allowed only three runs in five innings while the Cub bullpen held the Reds scoreless in the win.

==== August ====
- **August 1** – The Cubs returned home for a four-game series against the Cardinals. In game one, Shōta Imanaga allowed four runs in 6.2 innings of work. The Cubs, trailing 4–2 entering the ninth, rallied for the win as Cody Bellinger homered and Dansby Swanson and Mike Tauchmann hit back-to-back doubles.
- **August 2** – In game two against the Cardinals, the Cubs scored five runs in the second and held on for a 6–3 win over the Cardinals. Michael Busch and Christian Bethancourt homered in the win.
- **August 3** – Jameson Taillon allowed only one run in six innings and the Cubs led 4–1 going into the eighth as Michael Busch homered again and drove in two. However, in the eighth, the Cub bullpen allowed three runs to tie and Hector Neris allowed the go-ahead run in the ninth as the Cubs lost to the Cardinals 5–4.
- **August 4** – In the finale of the series against the Cardinals, Justin Steele allowed two runs in 6.2 innings of work. Mike Tauchmann and Miguel Amaya homered for the Cubs as they won 6–2.
- **August 5** – The Minnesota Twins next traveled to Wrigley for a three-game series. Kyle Hendricks allowed only two runs in six innings, but the Cubs were shutout 3–0.
- **August 6** – In game two against the Twins, Shōta Imanaga allowed two runs on two hits in seven innings. Isaac Paredes hit his first homer with the Cubs, a three-run homer in the first, and drove in another run as the Cubs won 7–3.
- **August 7** – Javier Assad allowed two runs in four innings while four relievers shut out the Twins for the remainder of the game. Micheal Busch and Ian Happ homered for the Cubs and four other Cubs drove in a run as the Cubs won easily 8–2.
- **August 9** – After an off day, the Cubs faced the White Sox at Guaranteed Rate Field. The White Sox, losers of 22 of their previous 23 games, fell behind quickly as Ian Happ and Cody Bellinger homered in the first. Isaac Parades and Nico Hoerner each homered in the third while Miguel Amaya drove in a run with a groundout to give the Cubs a 7–0 lead. However, the Cubs allowed the Sox to come within one as James Taillon gave up five runs in five innings and Drew Smyly allowed a run in the seventh. Hector Neris pitched the ninth for the save as the Cubs held on to win 7–6.
- **August 10** – In the finale of the two-game series against the White Sox, Justin Steele allowed only one unearned run in six innings. Isaac Parades doubled in a run and Miguel Amaya hit a two-run scoring single in the eighth to give the Cubs the 3–1 win. The Cubs, winners of eight of their last 10, moved to one game below .500 with the win at 59–60, only three games out of the final wild card spot.
- **August 12** – After another off day, the Cubs traveled to Cleveland to face the Guardians. The Cubs took an early lead on home runs by Ian Happ and Pete Crow-Armstrong. However, Shōta Imanaga allowed seven runs in five innings as the Guardians took an 8–3 lead. The Cubs ralled in the seventh, scoring four runs on a single by Nico Hoerner and a double by Dansby Swanson. A sacrifice fly by Seiya Suzuki in the eighth tied the game at eight. Julian Merryweather surrendered the lead in the bottom of the eighth as the Cubs lost 9–8.
- **August 13** – In game two against the Guardians, Javier Assad allowed only one run in 4.2 innings. Dansby Swanson drove in the lone Cub run in the second while Drew Smyly gave up a solo homer in the sixth as the Cubs lost 2–1.
- **August 14** – In the finale of the series against the Guardians, Jameson Taillon gave up four runs in six innings. The Cubs managed to score only one run, on a sacrifice fly by Cody Bellinger, and lost 6–1.
- **August 16** – After another scheduled off day, the Cubs returned to Wrigley to face the Toronto Blue Jays. Kyle Hendricks allowed only two runs in five innings. Cody Bellinger, Pete Crow-Armstrong, Miguel Amaya, and Ian Happ homered for the Cubs as they took a 5–2 lead into the ninth. However, Hector Neris allowed three runs, including balking in a run, in the ninth to tie the game at five. Going into the bottom of the 10th tied at five, Seiya Suzuki singled to drive in the winning run as the Cubs won 6–5.
- **August 17** – In game two against the Blue Jays, Ian Happ homered in the first while Michael Busch hit a two-run triple in the fifth to give the Cubs a 3–0 lead. Due to a couple of rain delays, starter Justin Steele only pitched two innings for the Cubs. However, six Cub relievers pitched seven innings and allowed only two runs as the Cubs won 3–2.
- **August 18** – In the finale of the series, Shōta Imanaga allowed a solo home run in five innings of work. The Cub bullpen combined to shut out the Blue Jays for the remainder of the game, but the Cub offense could not push across a run. As a result, the Cubs lost 1–0.
- **August 20** – After another off day, the Cubs returned to Wrigley to face the Detroit Tigers. The game marked the first tim former Cub Javier Báez returned to Chicago since being traded in 2021. Báez went 0–4 with four strikeouts in the game including the last out of the game. Javier Assad pitched 5.2 innings while allowing only one run. Dansby Swanson homered and Cody Bellinger drove in two runs as the Cubs won 3–1.
- **August 21** – In game two against the Tigers, Jameson Taillon allowed four runs in five innings. Christian Bethancourt hit a two-run homer for the Cubs to narrow the lead to two, but the Tigers added four in the ninth to win easily 8–2.
- **August 22** – In the finale of the series against the Tigers, Justin Steele allowed two runs in seven innings. Miguel Amaya hit his first career grand slam and drove in five runs as the Cubs blew out the Tigers 10–2.
- **August 23** – The Cubs next travelled to Miami to face the Marlins. Ian Happ and Miguel Amaya each hit two-run homers for the Cubs while Pete Crow-Armstrong hit an inside-the-park home run as the Cubs beat the Marlins 6–3.
- **August 24** – Shōta Imanaga pitched seven innings while allowing only two runs against the Marlins. Seiya Suzuki homered twice while Patrick Wisdom and Pete Crow-Armstrong also homered. Suzuki drove in four while Crow-Armstrong drove in three as the Cubs won easily 14–2. The win moved the Cubs back to .500 for the first time since June 5.
- **August 25** – Javier Assad pitched seven innings while allowing only three runs. However, the Cub offense only managed two runs and Julian Merryweather allowed four runs in the bottom of the eighth as the Cubs lost to the Marlins 7–2.
- **August 26** – The Cubs next faced the Pirates in Pittsburgh. The Cubs stole eight bases in the game, the most for the team in a game since 1913. They also scored the most runs on the season, scoring 18 runs on 21 hits in an 18–8 blowout. Dansby Swanson hit a grand slam and Miguel Amaya had four hits and drove in four runs in the easy win. The win again moved the Cubs to .500 on the season.
- **August 27** – Dansby Swanson homered again and drove in three runs. Seiya Suzuki also homered as he and Miguel Amaya drove in two runs each. Justin Steele allowed two runs in six innings as the Cubs beat the Pirates 9–5. The win moved the Cubs over .500 on the season for the first time since May 28.
- **August 28** — In the finale of the series against the Pirates, Kyle Hendricks and two relievers gave up 10 runs in five innings. Trailing 10–3, the Cubs added two runs in the seventh and three in the eighth to narrow the score to 10–8. In the top of the ninth, the Cubs scored five more runs to win the game 14–10. Christian Bethancourt homered and drove in seven runs for the Cubs. Ian Happ drove in two runs as well as the Cubs came from behind for the series sweep.
- **August 30** – After an off day, the Cubs traveled to Washington, D.C. to face the Nationals. The Cubs scored seven runs in the second inning as Cody Bellinger homered and drove in two runs. Pete Crow-Armstrong also drove in two runs. Shōta Imanaga allowed three runs in six innings. The Nationals scored three runs in the bottom of the ninth to close to within one at 7–6, but Keeegan Thompson got the final out to secure the 7–6 win. The win moved the Cubs three games over .500 on the season.
- **August 31** – Javier Assad allowed three runs in six innings against the Nationals. The Cubs scored two runs on errors by that Nationals and held on for a 5–3 win.

==== September ====
- **September 1** – The Cubs offense continued to score runs as they took a 7–1 lead into the ninth. In the ninth, the Cubs added seven more runs for a 14–1 win over the Nationals. Jordan Wicks allowed only one run in four innings as the Cubs swept the Nationals, winning their sixth straight game. Isaac Parades drove in three runs as the Cubs moved to five games over .500 and within three games of the final wild card spot.
- **September 2** – Returning home to face the Pirates and looking to narrow their wild car deficit, the Cubs took a 3–0 lead into the eighth before Jorge Lopez allowed a three-run and solo home run to put the Cubs down 4–3. The Pirates added a run in the ninth to hold to beat the Cubs 5–3.
- **September 3** – In game two against the Pirates, the Cubs offense was shut out 5–0. Kyle Hendricks allowed two runs in five innings while Tyson Miller allowed three runs in the seventh in the loss.
- **September 4** – Shōta Imanaga and two Cub relievers combined to no-hit the Pirates as the Cubs won easily 12–0, Dansby Swanson homered and drove in three runs while Cody Bellinger also homered in the win. The win move the Cubs back to four games over .500 and left them 4.5 games out of the last wild card spot.
- **September 6** – After a scheduled off day, the Cubs welcomed the New York Yankees to Wrigley. Anthony Rizzo, a member of the 2016 World Series team, returned to Wrigley for the first time since being traded in 2021. The Cubs were held to one hit as they were shut out 3–0.
- **September 7** – In game two against the Yankees, the Cubs were again shut out again, losing 2–0. The loss was the Cubs fourth loss in five games.
- **September 8** – In the finale against the Yankees, Isaac Parades drove in two runs in the first inning as the Cubs held on for a 2–1 win to avoid the sweep. Jameson Taillon allowed one run in six innings of work.
- **September 9** – The Cubs next traveled to Los Angeles to face the Dodgers. Cody Bellinger and Michael Busch each homered and drove in three runs against their old team as the Cubs won easily 10–4. Miguel Amaya drove in two runs in the win.
- **September 10** – In game two against the Dodgers, Shōta Imanaga allowed three runs in seven innings. Trailing 3–1 in the top of the eighth, the Cubs scored five runs with the help of three Dodger errors in the inning to take a 6–3 lead. In the ninth, Pete Crow-Armstrong robbed a home run for the final out as the Cubs won their third straight. Crow-Armstrong also drove in two runs in the win. The win moved the Cubs to 75–70 on the season.
- **September 11** – In the finale against the Dodgers, the Cubs took 2–0 lead in the top of the first before Jordan Wicks allowed four home runs in the bottom of the first as the Cubs fell behind 5–2. Wicks left after three innings, having surrendered seven runs. The Cubs rallied as Seiya Suzuki and Cody Bellinger homered to draw to 7–6. A Pete Crow-Armstrong single tied the game at seven in the fifth. However, the Cub bullpen surrendered the lead in the seventh as the Cubs lost 10–8.
- **September 13** – After an off day, the Cubs traveled to face the Colorado Rockies. Javier Assad allowed four runs in six innings as the Cubs trailed 5–2 entering the eighth. Micheal Busch hit a three-run homer in the top of the eighth to tie the game at five. However, Nate Pearson allowed a grand slam in the bottom of the eighth as the Cubs lost 9–5.
- **September 14** – In game two against the Rockies, the Cubs led 5–3 in the bottom of the ninth begore Porter Hodge allowed a two-run home run to tie it at five. In the 10th, Drew Smyly gave up a single as the Manfred runner scored for the Rockies as they won 6–5.
- **September 15** – In the finale of the series, Kyle Hendricks allowed only one run in six innings. Michael Bush hit two home runs and drove in three while Pete Crow-Armstrong homered and drove in two as the Cubs won 6–2.
- **September 16** – Returning home to face the Oakland A's, Shōta Imanaga pitched six innings and allowed only two runs. Dansby Swanson homered and drove in four as the Cubs blew out the A's 9–2.
- **September 17** – Jordan Wicks allowed four runs in five innings as the Cubs trailed 4–2 in the ninth. Ian Happ homered to narrow the lead to one, but it was not enough as the Cubs lost to the A's 4–3.
- **September 18** – In the final game of the series against the A's, Justin Steele returned from the IL but lasted only 2.2 innings before being lifted. The Cub bullpen held the A's in check as the Cubs took a 3–1 on RBIs by Dansby Swanson, Seiya Suzuki, and Cody Bellinger in the fifth. However, the A's tied it in the seventh and took the lead in the eighth as the Cubs lost 5–3. With the loss, the Brewers clinched the Central division title. The Cubs fell to seven games behind in the wild card race with only 10 games remaining in the season.
- **September 19** – The Cubs returned to Chicago to face the Nationals for four games. Javier Assad pitched fiving innings while allowing three runs and left with the Cubs ahead 5–3 thanks to a two-run Seiya Suzuki homer and RBIs by Cody Bellinger and Isaac Parades. However, the Cub bullpen surrendered the lead as Drew Smyly allowed a three-run homer. Bellinger and Parades each drove in another run in the seventh as the Cubs rallied for the 7–6 win. The win kept the Cubs mathematically alive in the playoff hunt.
- **September 20** – Jameson Taillon pitched six scoreless innings while the Cub bullpen allowed only run against the Nationals. Dansby Swanson homered and Mike Tauchman drove in two as the Cubs won 3–1.
- **September 21** – Kyle Hendricks allowed four runs in 5.1 innings of work. The Cub offense was held to one run, a Patrick Wisdom homer in the 7th, as the Cubs lost 3–1. The loss eliminated the Cubs from playoff contention.
- **September 22** – Shōta Imanaga pitched six scoreless innings while the Cub bullpen also held the Nationals scoreless. Mike Tauchman, Michael Busch, and Miguel Amaya all homered for the Cubs as they won 5–0.
- **September 23** – With only two series remaining in the season, the Cubs visited the Phillies for a three-game series. In a bullpen game, Caleb Kilian, making his season debut, allowed six runs in 5.1 innings of relief as the Cubs lost 6–2. The win clinched the NL East title for the Phillies.
- **September 24** – In game two against the Phillies, Justin Steele allowed two runs in four innings. The Cub bullpen allowed two runs in five innings of relief as the Cubs won 10–4. Cody Bellinger drove in four runs while Seiya Suzuki drove in two in the win.
- **September 25** – In the finale against the Phillies, Javier Assad allowed eight runs in 4.1 innings as the Cubs lost 9–6.
- **September 27** – The Cubs returned to Wrigley for the final series of the season against the Reds. Jameson Taillon pitched seven scoreless innings and two Cub relievers pitched perfect innings of relief as the Cubs won 1–0. Miguel Amaya drove in the only run of the game on a sacrifice fly in the fifth.
- **September 28** – In game two against the Reds, Kyle Hendricks allow no runs on two hits in 7.1 innings in perhaps his final start as a Cub. He was removed from the game in the seventh innings to a standing ovation. Isaac Paredes, Pete Crow-Armstrong, and Mike Tauchman each drove in a run as the Cubs won 3–0.
- **September 29** – In the final game of the season, the game went to extra innings tied at 0–0. Ethan Roberts allowed three runs in the top of the 10th as the Cubs lost 3–0.

=== Transactions ===
==== March ====
March 28	Placed RHP Caleb Killian on 60-day injured list (IL). Placed RHP Jameson Taillon and IF Patrick Wisdom on 15-day IL retroactive to March 25.
March 29	Signed free agent C Curt Casali to a minor league contract.
March 30	Placed LHP Justin Steele on 15-day IL retroactive to March 29. Recalled RHP Ben Brown from Iowa.

==== April ====
April 4	Signed free agent RHP Carl Edwards Jr. to a minor league contract.
April 5	Signed free agent C Ali Sánchez, RHP Jordan Henriquez, RHP Elvis Blanco, OF Leroy Escalante, and RHP Carlos Rangel to minor league contracta.
April 7	Placed RHP Julian Merryweather on 15-day IL retroactive to April 6. Recalled RHP Daniel Palencia from Iowa.
April 11	Traded C Joe Hudson to New York Mets.
April 12	Optioned RHP José Cuas to Iowa. Recalled RHP Keegan Thompson from Iowa.
April 15	Placed OF Seiya Suzuki on 10-day IL. Recalled OF Alexander Canario from Iowa.
April 17	Recalled RHP Hayden Wesneski from Iowa. Optioned LHP Luke Little and RHP Daniel Palencia to Iowa. Transferred RHP Julian Merryweather to 60-day IL. Selected the contract of RHP Colten Brewer from Iowa.
April 18	Activated RHP Jameson Taillon from 15-day IL and IF Patrick Wisdon from 10-day IL. Optioned IF Miles Mastrobuoni and RHP Hayden Wesneski to Iowa. Signed free agent RHP Julio Teherán to minor league contract.
April 20	Recalled LHP Luke Little from Iowa.
April 21	Optioned LHP Luke Little to Iowa. Signed LHP Mitchell Tyranski.
April 23	Recalled LHP Luke Little, IF Matt Mervis, and RHP Hayden Wesneski from Iowa. Designated IF Garrett Cooper for assignment. Placed RHP Kyle Hendricks and LHP Drew Smyly on 15-day IL.
April 24	Placed Of Cody Bellinger on the 10-day IL. Recalled OF Pete Crow-Armstrong from Iowa.
April 25	Signed free agent RHP Nico Zeglin to a minor league contract.
April 27	Traded IF Garrett Cooper to Boston Red Sox for cash. Signed free agent RHP Dan Straily to a minor league contract.
April 28	Placed LHP Jordan Wicks on 15-day IL. Recalled RHP Daniel Palencia from Iowa. Optioned LHP Luke Little to Iowa. Selected the contract of Richard Lovelady from Iowa.
April 29	Signed free agent RHP Roque Osorio, RHP Ismael Morey, RHP Fred Fajardo, RHP Gabriel Encarnacion, RHP Moises Flores, and RHP Rowell Arroyo to minor league contracts.
April 30	Signed free agent RHP Roque Osorio to a minor league contract.

==== May ====
May 1	Signed free agent RHP Aaron Perry to a minor league contract. Assigned RHP Jake Wong to Chicago Cubs.
May 4	Recalled IF Miles Mastrobuoni from Iowa. Optioned IF Matt Mervis to Iowa.
May 6	Activated LHP Justin Steele form IL. Optioned RHP Keegan Thompson to Iowa.
May 7	Activated OF Cody Bellinger from IL. Placed RHP Daniel Palencia on 15-day IL. Optioned OF Alexander Canario to Iowa. Recalled RHP Keegan Thompson from Iowa.
May 10	Placed IF Dansby Swanson on 10-day IL. Activated OF Seiya Suzuki from IL.
May 11	Recalled RHP José Cuas from Iowa. Placed RHP Yency Almonte on 15-day IL retroactive to May 8.
May 12	Activated RHP Kyle Hendricks from IL. Optioned José Cuas to Iowa.
May 13	Recalled José Cuas from Iowa. Placed RHP Adbert Alzolay on 15-day IL.
May 14	Traded IF Jake Slaughter and cash to Seattle Mariners for RHP Tyson Miller. Designated LHP Richard Lovelady for assignment.
May 15	Placed RHP Keegan Thompson on 15-day IL retroactive to May 12. Recalled LHP Luke Little
May 17	Placed RHP Colten Brewer on 15-day IL retroactive to May 14. Recalled RHP Porter Hodge from Iowa.
May 18	Traded RHP Richard Lovelady to Tampa Bay Rays for LHP Jeff Beige.
May 20	Activated IF Dansby Swanson from IL. Optioned OF Pete Crow-Armstrong and IF Miles Mastrobuoni to Iowa. Signed free agent RHP Trey Supak to a minor league contract.
May 21	Recalled IF Luis Vázquez from Iowa.
May 25	Activated LHP Drew Smyly from IL. Optioned RHP Jose Cuas to Iowa. Signed free agent RHP Jackson Tetreault to a minor league contract.
May 30	Recalled OF Pete Crow-Armstrong. Optioned IF Luis Vazquez to Iowa.

==== June ====
June 1	Signed free agent IF Axel Mancebo to a minor league contract.
June 2	Selected the contract of IF David Bote from Iowa. Optioned IF Nick Madrigal to Iowa. Transferred RHP Adbert Alzolay to 60-day IL.
June 3	Optioned RHP Daniel Palencia to Iowa.
June 7	Activated RHP Keegan Thompson and LHP Jordan Wicks from IL. Optioned RHPs Keegan Thompson and Porter Hodge to Iowa.
June 10	Signed free RHP Connor Schultz to a minor league contract.
June 11	Activated RHP Colten Brewer from IL. Signed free agent RHP Jorge López to a minor league contract.
June 15	Placed LHP Jordan Wicks on 15-day IL. Recalled RHP Keegan Thompson from Iowa. Signed free agent RHP Daniel Missaki to a minor league contract.
June 16	Selected the contract of RHP Ethan Roberts from Iowa. Designated RHP José Cuas for assignment.
June 18	Placed OF Mike Tauchman on 10-day IL. Recalled IF Miles Mastrobuoni from Iowa. Traded cash to Philadelphia Phillies for C William Simoneit.
June 19	Placed RHP Keegan Thompson the paternity list. Recalled RHP Porter Hodge from Iowa. Designated C Yan Gomes for assignment. Signed free agent C Tomás Nido.
June 21	Released C Yan Gomes. Signed fee agent RHP Antonio Santos to a minor league contract.
June 22	Activated RHP Keegan Thompson from paternity list. Optioned LHP Luke Little to Iowa.
June 23	Recalled LHP Luke Little from Iowa. Place RHP Mark Leiter Jr. on 15-day IL.
June 25	Signed free agent IF Jack Reinheimer to a minor league contract.
June 27	Signed free agent RHP Vinny Nittoli. Transferred RHP Yency Almonte to 60-day IL.
June 28	Recalled RHP Ethan Roberts from Iowa. Selected the contract of RHP Jorge López from Iowa. Place RHP Keegan Thompson on 15-day IL retroactive to June 27. Designated RHP Vinny Nittoli for assignment. Signed free agent IF Jake Hager.

==== July ====
July 1	Sent RHP Vinny Nittoli outright to Iowa
July 5	Signed free agent C Christian Bethancourt to a minor league contract
July 7	Selected the contract of RHP Hunter Bigge from Iowa. Placed RHP Colten Brewer on 60-day IL.
July 9	Activated RHP Mark Leiter Jr. from IL. Optioned RHP Ethan Roberts to Iowa.
July 10	Signed free agent OF Trayce Thompson to a minor league contract.
July 11	Placed OF Cody Bellinger on 10-day IL. Recalled OF Alexander Canario from Iowa.
July 13	Activated RHP Javier Assad from 15-day IL Recalled RHPs Daniel Palencia and Ethan Roberts from Iowa. Optioned Ethan Roberts to Iowa.
July 14	Optioned RHP Hunter Bigge to Iowa.
July 16	Optined RHP Daniel Palencia to Iowa.
July 16	Traded cash to Kansas City Royals for RHP Jesús Tinoco.
July 19	Optioned OF Alexander Canario to Iowa. Selected the contract of RHP Jesús Tinoco. Activated OF Mike Tauchman from 10-day IL.
July 20	Recalled RHP Hunter Bigge from Iowa. Placed RHP Hayden Wesneski on 15-day IL. Signed 3B Cam Smith, OF Ivan Brethowr, RHP Ryan Gallagher, RHP Daniel Avitia, 3B Matt Halbach, 1B Edgar Alvarez, RHP Brooks Caple, SS Ronny Cruz, 3B Cole Mathis, and C Ariel Armas.
July 22	Activated Julian Merryeweather from IL. Optioned RHP Hunger Bigge to Iowa. Placed LHP Luke Little on the 15-day IL retroactive to July 13.
July 23	Transferred LHP Luke Little to 60-day IL. Signed OF Eli Lovich, LHP Christian Gordon, RHP Thomas Mangus, C Owen Ayers., SS Ty Southisene, RHP Brayden Risedorph, LHP Evan Aschenbeck, 1B Cameron Sisneros, and LHP Hayden Frank.
July 25	Traded cash to Pittsburgh Pirates for OF Gilberto Celestino.
July 26	Placed C Thomás Nido on 15-day IL retroactive to July 25. Selected the contract of C Christian Bethancourt from Iowa. Transferred RHP Ben Brown to 60-day IL.
July 27	Traded SS John Rivera and OF Yohendrick Pinango to Toronto Blue Jays for RHP Nate Pearson. Designated RHP Jesús Tinoco for assignment.
July 28	Traded IF Christopher Morel, RHP Hunter Bigge, and RHP Ty Johnson to Tampa Bay Rays for 3B Isaac Paredes.
July 29	Activated OF Cody Bellinger from IL.
July 30	Traded RHP Mark Leiter Jr. to New York Yankees for SS Benjamin Cowles and RHP Jack Neely. Activated 3B Issac Paredes. Optioned IF Miles Mastrobuoni to Iowa. Recalled RHP Ethan Roberts from Iowa.
July 31	Activated RHP Caleb Kilian from 60-day IL. Optioned RHP Caleb Kilian to Iowa.

==== August ====
August 2	Received IF Kevin Padlo in trade from Kansas City Royals. Claimed RHP Trey Wingenter off waivers from Boston Red Sox.
August 6	Signed free agent RHP Adrian Houser to a minor league contract.
August 7	Activated RHP Keegan Thompson from 15-day IL. Optioned RHP Keegan Thompson to Iowa. Signed free agent RHP Josh Staumont and LHP Lucas Luetge to a minor league contract.
August 20	Released RHP Héctor Neris. Selected the contract of RHP Jack Neely
August 23	Recalled IF Luis Vazquez from Iowa. Designated IF David Bote for assignment. Claimed RHP Gavin Hollowell off waivers from Arizona Diamondbacks.
August 25	Outrighed IF David Bote to Iowa.
August 27	Placed RHP Julian Merryweather on 15-day IL retroactive to August 26. Recalled RHPs Daniel Palencia and Keegan Thompson from Iowa. Optioned RHP Jack Neely to Iowa.
August 30	Claimed RHP Shawn Armstrong off waivers from St. Louis Cardinals.
August 31	Activated RHP Shawn Armstrong. Optioned RHP Daniel Palencia to Iowa.

==== September ====
September 1	Recalled IF Miles Mastrobuoni from Iowa. Place IF Nick Madrigal on the 60-day IL.
September 4	Recalled RHPs Jack Neely and Trey Wingenter from Iowa. Placed LHP Justin Steele on 15-day IL retroactive to September 1. Placed RHP Jorge Lopez on 15-day IL retroactive to September 3.
September 13	Claimed RHP Jimmy Herget off waivers from Atlanta Braves. Recalled OF Brennen Davis from Iowa.
September 17	Optioned RHP Trey Wingenter to Iowa. Recalled RHP Daniel Palencia from Iowa.
September 18	Activated RHP Jorge López and LHP Justin Steele from IL. Optioned RHPs Jack Neely and Daniel Palencia to Iowa.
September 20	Placed LHP Jordan Wicks on 15-day IL retroactive to September 18. Activated RHP Hayden Wenseski from IL. Designated RHP Shawn Armstrong for assignment.
September 23	Placed RHP Jorge López on 15-day IL retroactive to September 20. Activated RHP Gavin Hollowell. Recalled RHPs Gavin Hollowell and Caleb Kilian from Iowa. Optioned RHP Trey Wingenter to ACL Cubs. Claimed RHP Enoli Paredes off waivers from Milwaukee Brewers.
September 24	Activated RHP Enoli Paredes. Released RHP Shawn Armstrong. Optioned RHP Gavin Hollowell to ACL Cubs.
September 25	Recalled OF Kevin Alcántara from Iowa. Optioned IF Miles Mastrobuoni to ACL Cubs.
September 29	Selected the contract of C Caleb Knight from Iowa. Optioned Knight to Iowa. Placed RHP Julian Merryweather on 60-day IL.

== Roster ==
2024 Chicago Cubs
Roster
Pitchers: 25 Yency Almonte; 73 Adbert Alzolay; 64 Shawn Armstrong; 72 Javier Assad; 47 Hunter Bigge; 54 Colten Brewer; 32 Ben Brown; 74 José Cuas; 28 Kyle Hendricks; 37 Porter Hodge; 46 Gavin Hollowell; 18 Shota Imanaga; 45 Caleb Kilian; 38 Mark Leiter Jr.; 43 Luke Little; 41 Jorge López; 49 Richard Lovelady; 66 Julian Merryweather; 49 Tyson Miller; 47 Jack Neely; 51 Héctor Neris; 48 Daniel Palencia; 59 Enoli Paredes; 56 Nate Pearson; 39 Ethan Roberts; 11 Drew Smyly; 35 Justin Steele; 50 Jameson Taillon; 71 Keegan Thompson; 0 Jesús Tinoco; 19 Hayden Wesneski; 36 Jordan Wicks; 38 Trey Wingenter	Catchers: 9 Miguel Amaya; 60 Christian Bethancourt; 15 Yan Gomes; 6 Tomás Nido; Infielders: 13 David Bote; 29 Michael Busch; 41 Garrett Cooper; 2 Nico Hoerner; 1 Nick Madrigal; 20 Miles Mastrobuoni; 22 Matt Mervis; 5 Christopher Morel; 17 Isaac Paredes; 7 Dansby Swanson; 12 Luis Vázquez; 16 Patrick Wisdom	Outfielders: 13 Kevin Alcántara; 24 Cody Bellinger; 4 Alexander Canario; 52 Pete Crow-Armstrong; 8 Ian Happ; 27 Seiya Suzuki; 40 Mike Tauchman	Manager: 30 Craig Counsell; Coaches: 96 James Adduci (assistant hitting/game planning); 63 Juan Cabreja (assistant hitting); 93 Erick Castillo (bullpen catcher); 84 Ryan Flaherty (bench); 33 Willie Harris (third base); 79 Darren Holmes (bullpen); 68 Tommy Hottovy (pitching); 76 Dustin Kelly (hitting); 85 Garrett Lloyd (bullpen catcher); 80 John Mallee (assistant hitting); 53 Daniel Moskos (assistant pitching); 90 Jonathan Mota (major league coach); 55 Mike Napoli (first base); 97 Alex Smith (data development and process); 81 Mark Strittmatter (major league field coordinator)

== Statistics ==
Note: Team leaders in each category are noted in bold.

=== Batting ===
(Final statistics)
Note: G = Games played; AB = At bats; R = Runs; H = Hits; 2B = Doubles; 3B = Triples; HR = Home runs; RBI = Runs batted in; SB = Stolen bases; BB = Walks; K = Strikeouts; AVG = Batting average; OBP = On-base percentage; SLG = Slugging percentage; TB = Total bases

Player	G	AB	R	H	2B	3B	HR	RBI	SB	BB	K	AVG	OBP	SLG	TB
Kevin Alcántara	3	10	1	1	0	0	0	0	0	0	1	.100	.100	.100	1
Miguel Amaya	117	328	32	76	13	2	8	47	0	23	62	.232	.357	.644	117
Cody Bellinger	130	516	72	137	23	3	18	78	9	45	89	.266	.325	.426	220
Christian Bethancourt	24	57	9	16	4	0	3	15	3	2	14	.281	.305	.509	29
David Bote	37	46	4	14	4	0	0	6	0	2	13	.304	.333	391	18
Michael Busch	152	496	73	123	28	2	21	65	2	63	162	.248	.335	.440	218
Alexander Canario	15	25	4	7	1	0	1	2	1	2	11	.280	.357	.440	11
Garrett Cooper	12	37	3	10	1	1	1	6	0	4	13	.270	.341	.432	16
Pete Crow-Armstrong	123	372	46	88	13	**6**	10	47	27	21	98	.237	.286	.384	143
Yan Gomes	34	91	7	14	2	0	2	7	0	2	36	.154	.179	.242	22
Ian Happ	**153**	569	**89**	138	34	2	**25**	**86**	13	**80**	**168**	.243	.341	.441	**251**
Nico Hoerner	151	**582**	86	**159**	**35**	1	7	48	**31**	44	66	.273	.335	.373	217
Nick Madrigal	51	86	5	19	3	0	0	10	1	4	10	.221	.280	.256	22
Miles Mastrobuoni	50	98	9	19	3	0	0	4	2	7	17	.194	.245	.224	22
Matt Mervis	9	26	1	3	1	0	0	3	0	1	8	.115	.148	.154	4
Christopher Morel	103	362	43	72	7	1	18	51	7	47	103	.199	.302	.373	135
Tomás Nido	17	47	5	6	2	0	1	4	0	1	15	.128	.143	.234	11
Isaac Paredes	52	179	23	40	6	0	3	25	1	24	37	.223	.325	.307	55
Seiya Suzuki	132	512	74	145	7	**6**	21	73	16	63	160	**.283**	**.366**	**.482**	247
Dansby Swanson	149	534	82	129	27	2	16	66	19	54	144	.242	.312	.390	208
Mike Tauchman	109	298	50	74	12	1	7	29	6	47	70	.248	.357	.366	109
Luis Vázquez	11	12	2	1	0	0	0	1	0	0	6	.083	.143	.083	1
Patrick Wisdom	75	158	16	27	7	2	8	23	5	10	59	.171	.237	.392	62
**Team totals**	162	5441	736	1318	253	29	170	696	143	546	1362	.242	.317	.393	2139

=== Pitching ===
(Final statistics)
Note: W = Wins; L = Losses; ERA = Earned run average G = Games pitched; GS = Games started; SV = Saves; IP = Innings pitched; H = Hits allowed; R = Runs allowed; ER = Earned runs allowed; BB = Walks allowed; K = Strikeouts

Player	W	L	ERA	G	GS	SV	IP	H	R	ER	BB	K
Yency Almonte	1	0	3.45	17	0	1	15.2	9	7	6	8	20
Adbert Alzolay	1	4	4.67	18	0	4	17.1	19	13	9	6	13
Shawn Armstrong	0	1	4.91	8	0	0	7.1	10	4	4	4	4
Javier Assad	7	6	3.73	29	**29**	0	147.0	143	64	61	**63**	124
Hunter Bigge	0	0	2.70	4	0	0	3.0	3	1	1	2	5
David Bote	0	0	0.00	1	0	0	1.0	1	0	0	1	0
Colten Brewer	0	0	5.66	16	0	1	20.2	24	16	13	9	22
Ben Brown	1	3	3.58	15	8	0	55.1	41	22	22	19	64
José Cuas	0	0	7.43	9	0	0	13.1	16	12	11	6	14
Kyle Hendricks	4	**12**	5.92	29	24	0	130.2	147	**88**	**86**	43	87
Porter Hodge	3	1	1.88	39	0	9	43.0	19	10	9	19	52
Shōta Imanaga	**15**	3	**2.91**	29	**29**	0	**173.1**	149	66	56	28	**174**
Mark Leiter Jr.	2	4	4.21	39	0	0	36.1	27	20	17	13	53
Luke Little	3	1	3.46	30	1	0	26.0	15	11	10	18	28
Jorge López	1	1	2.03	24	0	2	26.2	21	6	6	8	31
Richard Lovelady	0	1	7.94	7	0	0	5.2	9	5	5	2	6
Julian Merryweather	1	1	6.60	15	0	0	15.0	18	11	11	9	14
Matt Mervis	0	0	81.00	1	0	0	0.2	7	6	6	0	0
Tyson Miller	5	1	2.15	49	0	1	50.1	31	13	13	10	42
Jack Neely	0	0	9.00	6	0	0	6.0	8	6	6	2	7
Héctor Neris	8	4	3.89	46	0	**17**	44.0	41	20	19	26	46
Daniel Palencia	0	1	6.14	10	0	1	14.2	14	11	10	12	16
Nate Pearson	2	1	2.73	19	1	0	26.1	22	8	8	4	23
Ethan Roberts	1	1	3.71	21	0	0	26.2	31	11	11	10	26
Drew Smyly	4	8	3.84	**50**	0	0	58.2	57	29	25	25	56
Justin Steele	5	5	3.07	24	24	0	134.2	111	54	46	37	135
Jameson Taillon	12	8	3.27	28	28	0	165.1	**154**	67	60	33	125
Keegan Thompson	2	1	2.67	24	0	2	30.1	19	12	9	18	36
Jesús Tinoco	0	0	0.00	2	0	0	4.0	3	0	0	0	3
Hayden Wesneski	3	6	3.86	28	7	0	67.2	56	37	29	21	67
Jordan Wicks	2	4	5.48	11	10	0	46.0	55	31	28	20	42
Trey Wingenter	0	0	3.00	5	0	0	6.0	8	2	2	2	3
Patrick Wisdom	0	0	0.00	1	0	0	0.1	1	0	0	1	0
**Team totals**	83	79	3.78	162	162	38	1432.1	1302	669	602	485	1348

== Farm system ==
On February 5, the Cubs announced the minor league managers for their farm system.

Level	Team	League	Manager	Location	Ballpark
AAA	Iowa Cubs	International League	Marty Pevey	Des Moines, Iowa	Principal Park
AA	Tennessee Smokies	Southern League	Lance Rymel	Knoxville, Tennessee	Smokies Stadium
High-A	South Bend Cubs	Midwest League	Nick Lovullo	South Bend, Indiana	Four Winds Field at Coveleski Stadium
Single-A	Myrtle Beach Pelicans	Carolina League	Buddy Bailey	Myrtle Beach, South Carolina	TicketReturn.com Field
Rookie	ACL Cubs	Arizona Complex League	Corey Ray	Mesa, Arizona	Sloan Park
Rookie	DSL Cubs	Dominican Summer League	Enrique Wilson; Carlos Ramirez	Boca Chica, Dominican Republic	Baseball City Complex
