= Luke Little =

American baseball player (born 2000)

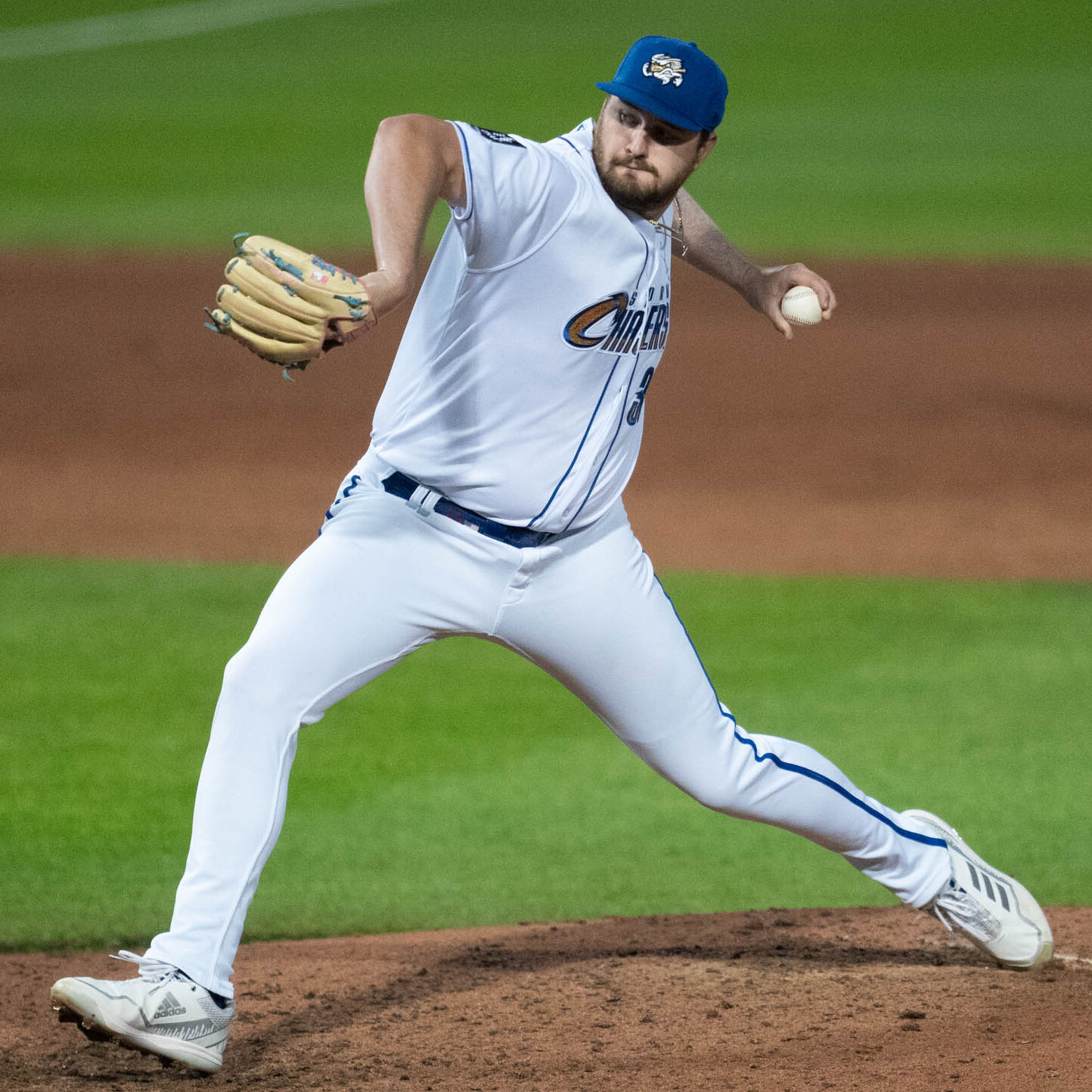
- Little with the Omaha Storm Chasers in 2026

Athletics
- Pitcher
- Born: August 30, 2000 (age 26); Charlotte, North Carolina, U.S.
- Bats: Left Throws: Left

MLB debut
- September 6, 2023, for the Chicago Cubs

MLB statistics (through 2026 season)
- Win–loss record: 3–1
- Earned run average: 2.97
- Strikeouts: 45
- Stats at Baseball Reference

Teams
- Chicago Cubs (2023–2026)

Luke Justice Little (born August 30, 2000) is an American professional baseball pitcher in the Athletics organization. He was drafted by the Chicago Cubs in the fourth round of the 2020 MLB draft and made his MLB debut in 2023.

== Amateur career ==
Little attended East Mecklenburg High School in Charlotte, North Carolina and played college baseball at San Jacinto College. He played collegiate summer baseball for the Traverse City Pit Spitters in the Northwoods League, soon becoming the first Pit Spitter alumnus to play in the majors.

== Professional career ==
=== Chicago Cubs ===
The Chicago Cubs drafted Little in the fourth round, with the 117th overall selection, of the 2020 Major League Baseball draft. He did not play in a game in 2020 due to the cancellation of the minor league season because of the COVID-19 pandemic. Little made his professional debut in 2021 with the rookie–level Arizona Complex League Cubs. He spent 2022 with the Single–A Myrtle Beach Pelicans and High–A South Bend Cubs.

In 36 appearances in 2023 with South Bend, the Double–A Tennessee Smokies and Triple–A Iowa Cubs, Little accumulated a 5–2 record and 2.12 ERA with 105 strikeouts in 63 2/3 innings pitched. On September 6, 2023, Little was selected to the 40-man roster and promoted to the major leagues for the first time. Upon making the majors, the 6'8" Little tied the record with Chris Volstad from the 2012 season for being the tallest starting pitcher in Chicago Cubs history. In the 2023 season he pitched in seven games, allowing no runs and five hits over 6 2/3 innings.

Little was named a part of the Cubs' 2024 opening-day bullpen before the season began. On April 3, 2024, Little made his first start, throwing one strikeout with no earned runs in one inning a win against the Colorado Rockies. In 30 appearances for Chicago, he compiled a 3.46 ERA with 28 strikeouts across 26 innings pitched. Little was placed on the injured list with a left shoulder strain on July 13. He was transferred to the 60–day injured list on July 22, with what was described as a "likely" season–ending lat strain.

Little was optioned to Triple-A Iowa to begin the 2025 season. He made two appearances for Chicago during the regular season, recording a 3.38 ERA with four strikeouts across 2 2/3 innings pitched.

Little was again optioned to Triple-A Iowa to begin the 2026 season. He made one appearance for Chicago on April 15, 2026, allowing a home run to Bryce Harper as the Cubs beat the Philadelphia Phillies, 11–2. Little was designated for assignment by Chicago on August 3.

=== Kansas City Royals ===
On August 6, 2026, Little was claimed off of waivers by the Kansas City Royals. On October 1, the Royals sent him outright to Triple-A Omaha Storm Chasers. He elected free agency on November 2.

=== Athletics ===
On November 17, 2026, Little signed a minor league contract with the Athletics.
