= Ben Brown (baseball) =

American baseball player (born 1999)

Chicago Cubs – No. 32
- Pitcher
- Born: September 9, 1999 (age 27); East Setauket, New York, U.S.
- Bats: Right Throws: Right

MLB debut
- March 30, 2024, for the Chicago Cubs

MLB statistics (through 2026 season)
- Win–loss record: 10–13
- Earned run average: 4.15
- Strikeouts: 250
- Stats at Baseball Reference

Teams
- Chicago Cubs (2024–present)

Benjamin Brown (born September 9, 1999) is an American professional baseball pitcher for the Chicago Cubs of Major League Baseball (MLB). He made his MLB debut in 2024.

== Early life and amateur career ==
Brown attended Ward Melville High School in East Setauket, New York. At 17 years old, after getting off to a strong start in his junior baseball season, he suffered a ruptured appendix, was hospitalized for a week and lost 30 pounds (14 kg). After his hospitalization and weight loss, at least five college baseball programs withdrew their scholarship offers to Brown. Nonetheless, he added back 15 pounds (6.8 kg) of muscle and finished his senior year with a 1.18 earned run average. His fastball topped out at 92 miles per hour (148 km/h) as a senior and he committed to play college baseball at Siena.

== Professional career ==
=== Philadelphia Phillies ===
The Philadelphia Phillies selected Brown in the 33rd round of the 2017 Major League Baseball draft. He made his professional debut with the Gulf Coast Phillies and pitched 2018 with the Gulf Coast Phillies and Williamsport Crosscutters. He started the 2019 season with the Lakewood BlueClaws before suffering an injury which caused him to undergo Tommy John surgery. Brown returned from the injury in 2021 to pitch for the Florida Complex League Phillies and was on the Opening Day roster of the Jersey Shore BlueClaws. He began the 2022 season with Jersey Shore.

=== Chicago Cubs ===
On August 2, 2022, the Phillies traded Brown to the Chicago Cubs in exchange for David Robertson. At the end of the 2022 season, Brown was named South Atlantic League Pitcher of the Year. On November 15, the Cubs added Brown to their 40-man roster to protect him from the Rule 5 draft.

Brown was optioned to the Double-A Tennessee Smokies to begin the 2023 season, then joined the Iowa Cubs in May. Brown missed a portion of the 2023 season due to an oblique injury. In 26 games split between Tennessee and Iowa, he accumulated an 8–8 record and 4.27 ERA with 100 strikeouts across 72 2/3 innings pitched. Brown was optioned to Triple-A Iowa to begin the 2024 season.

Following an injury to Justin Steele, Brown was called up to the major leagues on March 30, 2024. In his debut, Brown allowed five hits and two walks which yielded six runs in 1 2/3 innings pitched along with one strikeout against the Texas Rangers. On April 9, Brown made his first start, giving up three hits and one walk with five strikeouts in 4 2/3 innings in a win against the San Diego Padres. In his sixth career start, Brown tossed seven no–hit innings with a career–high ten strikeouts against the Milwaukee Brewers. On June 9, Brown was placed on the injured list with a left neck strain, an injury that was later revealed to be a stress fracture in his neck.

Brown made the Cubs' Opening Day roster in 2026. He made 20 appearances (including eight starts) for Chicago, posting a 4–2 record and 1.85 ERA with 65 strikeouts and one save over 68 innings of work. On June 24, 2026, Brown was placed on the injured list due to a neck strain. Two days later, the injury was diagnosed as a stress fracture, and was given a recovery timetable of at least one month. On August 26, it was reported that Brown had experienced a setback in his recovery. On September 3, he was formally ruled out for the remainder of the season.

== Personal life ==
As a child, Brown was a fan of the Boston Red Sox. Brown's favorite players included Ben Zobrist, Jon Lester and Kyle Hendricks.
