= Ben Cowles =

American baseball player (born 2000)

Chicago Cubs
- Infielder
- Born: February 15, 2000 (age 26); Rochester, New York, U.S.
- Bats: Right Throws: Right

Benjamin Joseph Cowles (born February 15, 2000) is an American professional baseball infielder in the Chicago Cubs organization.

== Career ==
=== New York Yankees ===
Cowles graduated from Newark High School in Newark, New York. He attended the University of Maryland, College Park and played college baseball for the Maryland Terrapins.

The New York Yankees selected Cowles in the 10th round of the 2021 MLB draft. He began the 2022 season with the Tampa Tarpons and received a midseason promotion to the Hudson Valley Renegades. Returning to Hudson Valley in 2023, Cowles set a franchise record for consecutive games reaching base safely. The Yankees assigned Cowles to the Somerset Patriots for the 2024 season.

=== Chicago Cubs ===
On July 30, 2024, the Yankees traded Cowles and Jack Neely to the Chicago Cubs in exchange for Mark Leiter Jr. In 4 games for the Double–A Tennessee Smokies, he went 1–for–13 (.077) with 2 walks. However, Cowles was ruled out for the remainder of the season due to lingering effects after being hit by a pitch in his final game for Somerset. Following the season, the Cubs added Cowles to their 40-man roster to protect him from the Rule 5 draft.

Cowles was optioned to the Triple-A Iowa Cubs to begin the 2025 season, where he batted .238/.304/.382 with nine home runs, 44 RBI, and 16 stolen bases across 114 appearances. On September 1, 2025, Cowles was designated for assignment by the Cubs.

=== Chicago White Sox ===
On September 3, 2025, Cowles was claimed off waivers by the Chicago White Sox. He played in 15 games for the Triple-A Charlotte Knights, batting .220/.277/.288 with five RBI and two stolen bases. On January 8, 2026, Cowles was designated for assignment following the acquisition of Drew Romo.

=== Chicago Cubs (second stint) ===
On January 15, 2026, Cowles was claimed off waivers by the Chicago Cubs. He was designated for assignment following the signing of Shelby Miller on February 15. On February 18, Cowles was claimed off waivers by the Toronto Blue Jays. On March 1, Cowles was claimed back off of waivers by the Cubs. He was optioned to the Triple-A Iowa Cubs to begin the regular season. In 20 appearances for Iowa, Cowles batted .232/.333/.377 with two home runs, nine RBI, and four stolen bases. On April 28, Cowles was designated for assignment following the acquisition of Doug Nikhazy. He cleared waivers and was sent outright to Iowa on May 3.
