= Jordan Wicks =

American baseball player (born 1999)

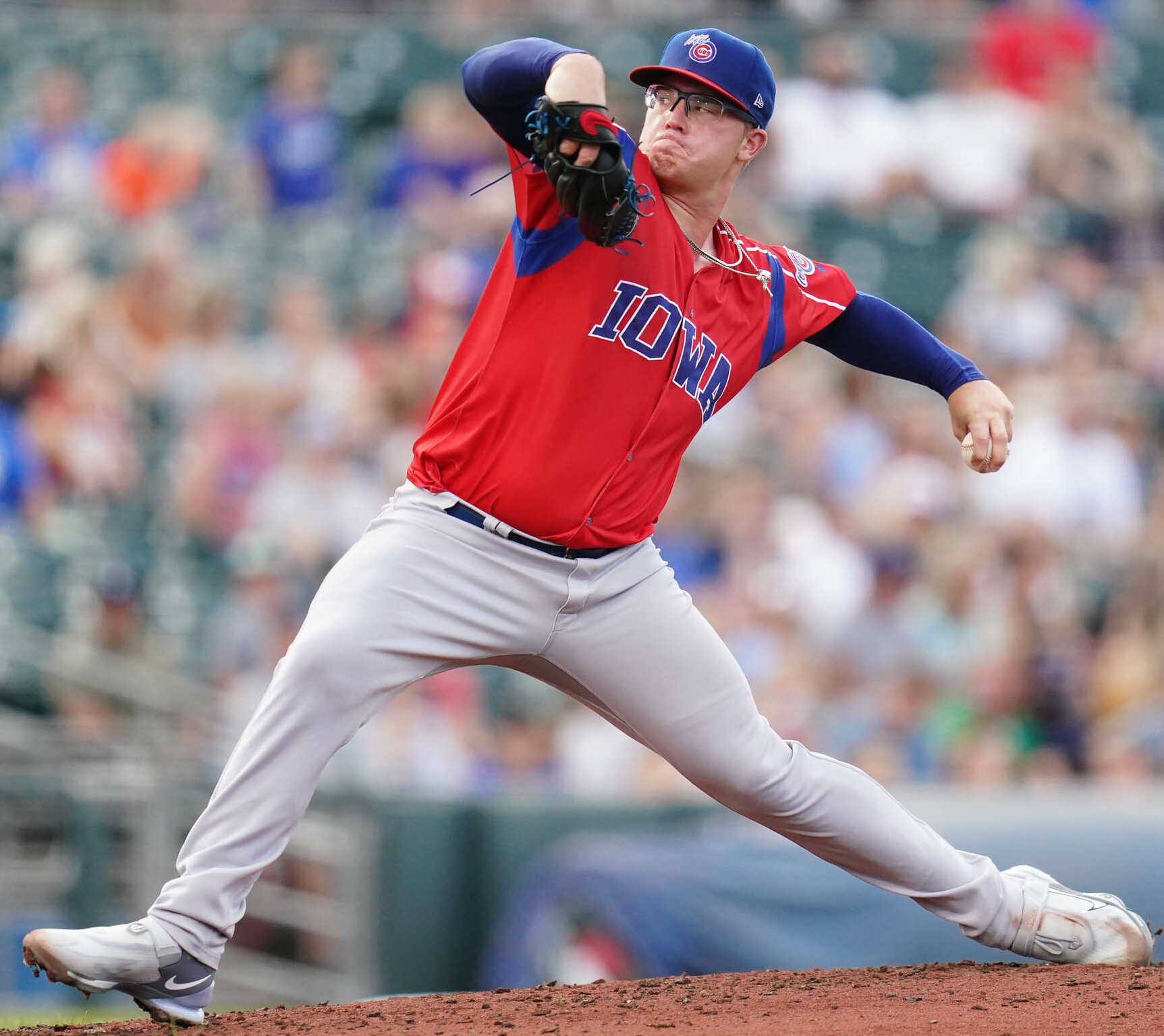
- Wicks with the Iowa Cubs in 2023

Chicago Cubs – No. 36
- Pitcher
- Born: September 1, 1999 (age 27); Conway, Arkansas, U.S.
- Bats: Left Throws: Left

MLB debut
- August 26, 2023, for the Chicago Cubs

MLB statistics (through 2026 season)
- Win–loss record: 6–8
- Earned run average: 5.72
- Strikeouts: 87
- Stats at Baseball Reference

Teams
- Chicago Cubs (2023–present)

Jordan Maslin Wicks (born September 1, 1999) is an American professional baseball pitcher for the Chicago Cubs of Major League Baseball (MLB). He made his MLB debut in 2023.

== Amateur career ==
Wicks attended Conway High School in Conway, Arkansas, where he played baseball and football. In 2018, his senior year, he went 11–1 with a 0.86 ERA, and finished his high school career with a school record 1.39 ERA. Undrafted in the 2018 Major League Baseball draft, he enrolled at Kansas State University to play college baseball.

In 2019, Wicks' freshman year at Kansas State, he started 15 games and posted a 6-3 record with a 3.61 ERA, and was named the Big 12 Conference Freshman of the Year. He set freshman program records with 86 strikeouts and 84 2/3 innings pitched. As a sophomore in 2020, he started four games and gave up one earned run over 26 innings for a 0.35 ERA before the college baseball season was ended early due to the COVID-19 pandemic. He spent that summer playing in the Northwoods League for the Rockford Rivets, compiling a 0.52 ERA with 52 strikeouts over 34 2/3 innings; later he would become the first Rivet alumnus to play in the majors. Prior to the 2021 season, he was unanimously named the Big 12 Conference Preseason Pitcher of the Year. For the 2021 season, Wicks went 6–3 with a 3.70 ERA over 14 starts, striking out 118 over 92 1/3 innings, earning All-Big 12 First Team honors.

== Professional career ==
Wicks was selected by the Chicago Cubs in the first round with the 21st overall selection of the 2021 Major League Baseball draft. This makes Wicks both the highest and the first ever first round draft pick to come out of Kansas State's baseball program. He signed for a $3.1 million signing bonus.

Wicks made his professional debut with the South Bend Cubs of the High-A Central, pitching seven innings while giving up four earned runs and three walks while striking out five. He returned to South Bend to open the 2022 season. In mid-July, he was promoted to the Tennessee Smokies of the Double-A Southern League. Over 24 starts between the two teams, he went 4-6 with a 3.80 ERA and 121 strikeouts over 94 2/3 innings. He returned to the Smokies open the 2023 season. In late June, he was promoted to the Iowa Cubs of the Triple-A International League. Across 20 starts between the teams, he went 7-0 with a 3.55 ERA and 99 strikeouts in 91 1/3 innings.

On August 26, 2023, Wicks was promoted to the major leagues by the Cubs to make his first career start against the Pittsburgh Pirates. He made his MLB debut that day at PNC Park and allowed one run on two hits and one walk while recording nine strikeouts in a 10-6 Cubs victory. Across seven starts with the Cubs, Wicks compiled a 4–1 record and 4.41 ERA with 24 strikeouts over 34 2/3 innings pitched.

Wicks was named to his first Opening Day roster to begin the 2024 season as a member of Chicago's starting rotation. He was placed on the injured list with a Grade 2 oblique strain on June 15, and was transferred to the 60–day injured list on July 19. Wicks was activated on September 1. Across ten starts for the Cubs, Wicks compiled a 2–4 record and 5.48 ERA with 42 strikeouts over 46 innings pitched.

Wicks was optioned to Iowa to open the 2025 season. He was recalled by the Cubs for the first time during the season on April 18, and was optioned and recalled by the club various times throughout the year. Wicks made eight relief appearances for Chicago during the season, going 0–1 with a 6.28 ERA and 13 strikeouts over 14 1/3 innings. With Iowa, he made 16 starts and went 3-4 with a 3.55 ERA.

Wicks opened the 2026 season on the injured list with nerve irritation. He was activated on May 15 and optioned to Iowa. Wicks was recalled by the Cubs for the first time on May 24 and then a second time on June 28. He was optioned back to Iowa on July 2, and spent the remainder of the season there. Wicks pitched a total of 10 1/3 innings for the Cubs and had a 10.45 ERA and eight strikeouts. With Iowa, he appeared in 23 games and had a 2–11 record, a 5.99 ERA, and 72 strikeouts over 88 2/3 innings.

== Personal life ==
Wicks is a Christian, having stated "God is the rock of my life. He is always there and he always loves me no matter what happens on that field.“
