= Jack Neely =

American baseball player (born 2000)

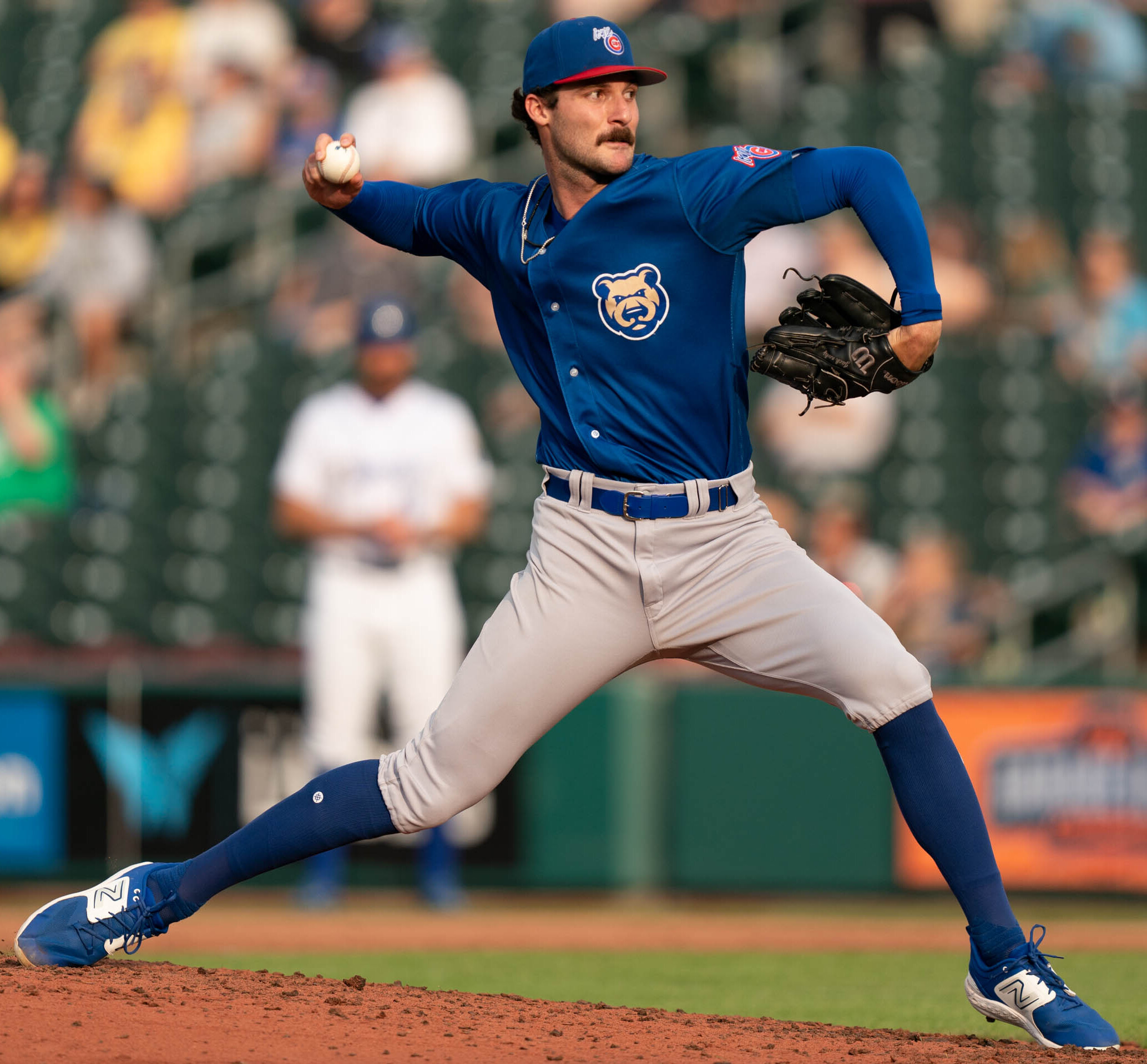
- Neely with the Iowa Cubs in 2025

Chicago Cubs
- Pitcher
- Born: June 5, 2000 (age 26); San Antonio, Texas, U.S.
- Bats: Right Throws: Right

MLB debut
- August 21, 2024, for the Chicago Cubs

MLB statistics (through 2024 season)
- Win–loss record: 0–0
- Earned run average: 9.00
- Strikeouts: 7
- Stats at Baseball Reference

Teams
- Chicago Cubs (2024)

Jack Preston Neely (born June 5, 2000) is an American professional baseball pitcher in the Chicago Cubs organization. He made his Major League Baseball (MLB) debut in 2024.

== Career ==
=== Amateur career ===
Neely attended Winston Churchill High School in San Antonio, Texas and played college baseball at the University of Texas at Austin, Iowa Western Community College and Ohio State University.

=== New York Yankees ===
The New York Yankees selected Neely in the 11th round, with the 333rd overall pick, of the 2021 Major League Baseball draft. Neely signed with the Yankees and made his professional debut with the Single–A Tampa Tarpons.

Neely split the 2022 season between Tampa and the High–A Hudson Valley Renegades, accumulating a 3.58 ERA with 87 strikeouts and 7 saves across 38 relief outings. In 2023, Neely played with Hudson Valley and the Double–A Somerset Patriots, registering a combined 6–5 record and 2.17 ERA with 100 strikeouts and 7 saves over 42 games out of the bullpen. Neely began the 2024 campaign with Somerset, and was promoted to the Triple–A Scranton/Wilkes-Barre RailRiders in June.

=== Chicago Cubs ===
On July 30, 2024, the Yankees traded Neely and Ben Cowles to the Chicago Cubs in exchange for pitcher Mark Leiter Jr. He made six scoreless appearances for the Triple–A Iowa Cubs, striking out 13 batters and recording three saves. On August 20, Neely was selected to the 40-man roster and promoted to the major leagues for the first time. In six games for the Cubs during his rookie campaign, he struggled to a 9.00 ERA with seven strikeouts over six innings of work.

Neely was optioned to Triple-A Iowa to begin the 2025 season. In 28 appearances for Iowa, Neely accumulated an 0–2 record and 6.23 ERA with 39 strikeouts and five saves across 30 1/3 innings pitched.

Neely was again optioned to Triple-A Iowa to begin the 2026 season. However, on March 25, 2026, Neely was designated for assignment by the Cubs. He cleared waivers and was sent outright to Iowa on March 29. On May 12, he was placed on the full-season injured list ending his season without appearing in a game.
