= Brennen Davis =

American baseball player (born 1999)

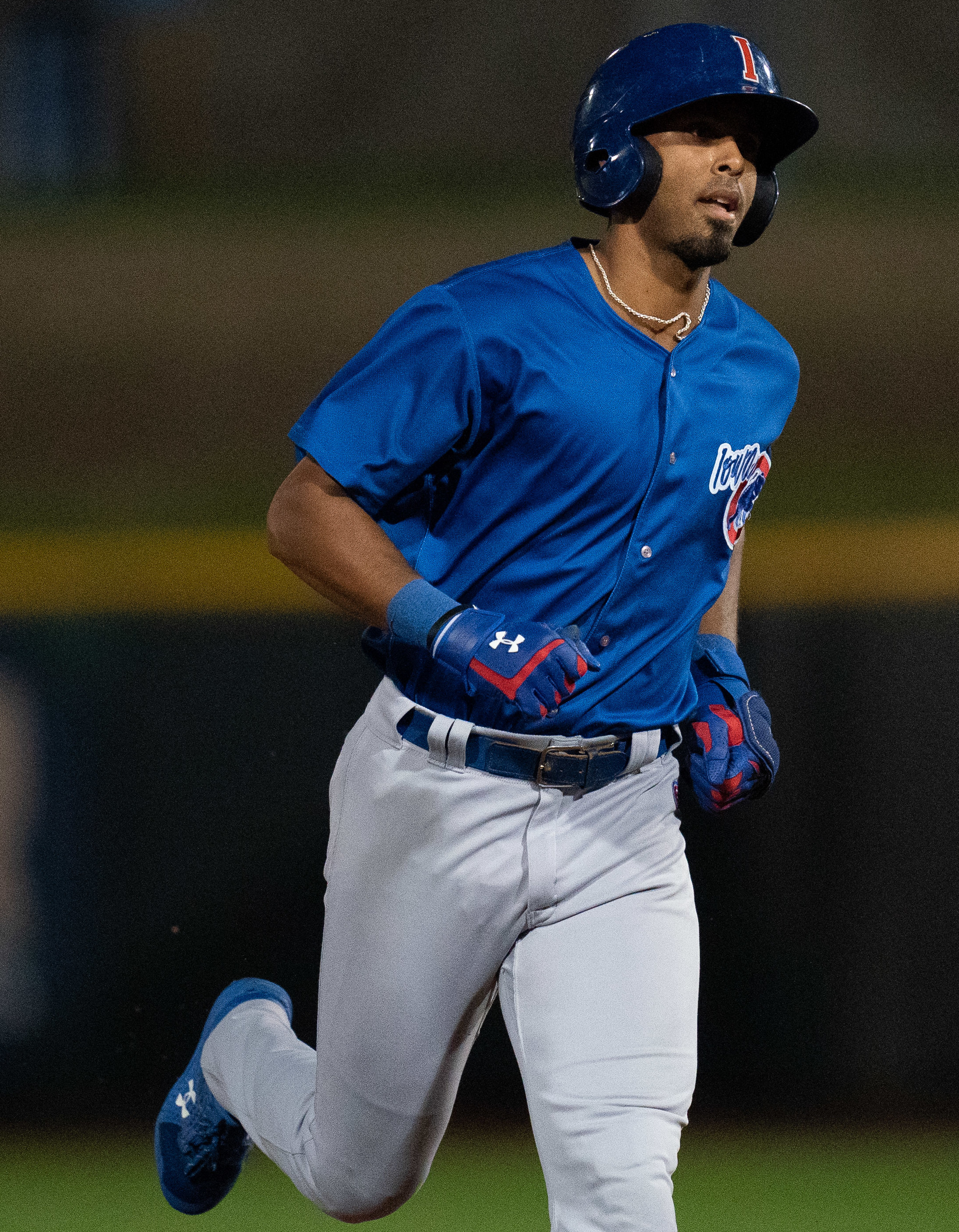
- Davis with the Iowa Cubs in 2021

Seattle Mariners
- Outfielder
- Born: November 2, 1999 (age 27); Chandler, Arizona, U.S.
- Bats: Right Throws: Right
- Stats at Baseball Reference

Career highlights and awards
- All-Star Futures Game MVP (2021)

Brennen Davis (born November 2, 1999) is an American professional baseball outfielder for the Seattle Mariners of Major League Baseball (MLB). He was selected by the Chicago Cubs in the 2nd round of the 2018 MLB draft.

== Amateur career ==
Davis attended Basha High School in Chandler, Arizona, where he played baseball and basketball. He committed to play college baseball at the University of Miami. Following his senior year, he was selected by the Chicago Cubs in the second round of the 2018 Major League Baseball draft. He signed for a $1.1 million signing bonus.

== Professional career ==
=== Chicago Cubs ===
Davis made his professional debut with the Rookie-level Arizona League Cubs, hitting .298 over 18 games in 2018. He spent the 2019 season with the South Bend Cubs of the Single–A Midwest League, slashing .305/.381/.525 with eight home runs and 30 RBI over 50 games. Davis did not play in a game in 2020 due to the cancellation of the minor league season because of the COVID-19 pandemic.

Davis missed part of the 2021 season after he took a pitch to the face in an April spring training game. Once recovered, he was assigned to South Bend before he was promoted to the Tennessee Smokies of the Double-A South on June 1. That same month, Davis was selected to play in the All-Star Futures Game, where he earned MVP honors for his two-homer performance in an 8-3 National League victory. In September, he was promoted to the Iowa Cubs of the Triple-A East. After finishing the season with a .260/.375/.494 slash line, 19 home runs, and 53 RBI over 99 games across three levels of the minor leagues, Davis was awarded his second Buck O'Neil Cubs Minor League Player of the Year award.

In 2022, Davis played for three minor league affiliates. He batted .180/.299/.298, not hitting higher than .192 with any of the three teams. On June 3, 2022, Davis underwent back surgery. On November 15, the Cubs added Davis to their 40-man roster to protect him from the Rule 5 draft.

Davis was optioned to the Triple-A Iowa Cubs to begin the 2023 season. In 62 games, he batted .187/.296/.279 with 4 home runs, 26 RBI, and 9 stolen bases. Davis was again optioned to Triple–A Iowa to begin the 2024 season. He suffered a back injury during the season that caused him to miss two months. After briefly returning, Davis was placed on the injured list after suffering a fractured left ankle on September 13, 2024, ending his season. In 55 total games split between Tennessee and Iowa, he slashed .220/.369/.451 with 11 home runs and 32 RBI. Davis was designated for assignment by the Cubs on November 19. On November 22, the Cubs non–tendered Davis, making him a free agent.

=== New York Yankees ===
On December 24, 2024, Davis signed a minor league contract with the New York Yankees. In 2025, he made 50 appearances for the Triple-A Scranton/Wilkes-Barre RailRiders, Double-A Somerset Patriots, and rookie-level Florida Complex League Yankees, batting a combined .271/.364/.612 with 17 home runs and 39 RBI. Davis elected free agency following the season on November 6, 2025.

=== Seattle Mariners ===
On December 18, 2025, Davis signed a minor league contract with the Seattle Mariners that included an invitation to spring training. On May 18, 2026, the Mariners added Davis to their 40-man roster and subsequently optioned him to the Triple-A Tacoma Rainiers. He made 47 appearances for Tacoma, slashing .265/.376/.512 with nine home runs and 31 RBI. On September 3, Davis was placed on the 60–day injured list due to a left hamstring strain, officially ending his season.

== Personal life ==
Davis' father is former Chicago Bulls player Reggie Theus and his mother is Jakki Davis-Dollak. Theus never has been part of Davis' life. His mother is a former standout long jumper at the University of Washington.
