= David Bote =

American baseball player (born 1993)

- Infielder
- Born: April 7, 1993 (age 33); Longmont, Colorado, U.S.
- Batted: Right Threw: Right

MLB debut
- April 21, 2018, for the Chicago Cubs

Last MLB appearance
- August 22, 2024, for the Chicago Cubs

MLB statistics
- Batting average: .234
- Home runs: 36
- Runs batted in: 156
- Stats at Baseball Reference

Teams
- Chicago Cubs (2018–2022, 2024)

David C. Bote (/ˈboʊtiː/ BOH-tee, born April 7, 1993) is an American former professional baseball infielder. He played in Major League Baseball (MLB) for the Chicago Cubs from 2018 through 2024. Despite his decision to retire, his rights are retained by the Los Angeles Dodgers organization, who maintain him on the minor league restricted list.

== Amateur career ==
Bote attended Erie High School in Erie, Colorado, as a freshman and later transferred to Faith Christian Academy in Arvada, Colorado. As a senior in 2011, Bote led Faith Christian to the 3A Colorado state title in baseball. Bote enrolled at Liberty University to play college baseball as a walk-on, but after a semester, transferred to Neosho County Community College in Kansas. During his lone collegiate season, he hit .419.

== Professional career ==
=== Chicago Cubs ===
The Chicago Cubs selected Bote in the 18th round, with the 554th overall selection, of the 2012 Major League Baseball draft. After Bote signed with the Cubs for $100,000 plus college tuition, he was assigned to the Arizona League Cubs where he batted .232 with one home run, 14 RBIs and seven doubles in 38 games. He spent 2013 with the Daytona Cubs, Kane County Cougars, and Boise Hawks, posting a combined .227 batting average with seven home runs and 38 RBIs in 90 total games between the three teams, and 2014 with Kane County, Boise, and the Iowa Cubs, compiling a combined .235 batting average with four home runs and 40 RBIs in 99 games. In 2015, he played for the South Bend Cubs where he slashed .251/.328/384 with six home runs and 41 RBIs, and in 2016, he spent time with Iowa, the Tennessee Smokies, and the Myrtle Beach Pelicans, batting a combined .328 with seven home runs and 45 RBIs with an .892 OPS.

In 2017, Bote played for the Tennessee Smokies where he was named a Southern League All-Star. After the season, he played in the Arizona Fall League and was selected to play in the Fall Stars Game. The Cubs added him to their 40-man roster after the season. In the minor leagues, Bote had played at every position except catcher.

Bote made his major league debut on April 21, 2018, taking the place of Ben Zobrist who was placed on the disabled list. Bote filled in for a week at third for an injured Kris Bryant. He had 19 at bats with five hits, five RBIs, one stolen base and a batting average of .263 before being sent back to the Iowa Cubs. On July 26, 2018, Bote hit a game-tying, two-run home run with one out in the bottom of the ninth inning against Arizona Diamondbacks pitcher Brad Boxberger, which was immediately followed by a walk-off solo home run by teammate Anthony Rizzo. On August 12, 2018, Bote hit a pinch hit, two-out, two-strike walk-off grand slam off Washington Nationals pitcher Ryan Madson to give his team a one-run victory, which had not been done since Roger Freed in 1979, giving the Cubs a 4–3 victory and a two-out-of-three series win, marking the second time in Major League Baseball history that a player hit a walk-off grand slam to win by a score of 4–3. On August 24, 2018, Bote hit his 2nd career walk-off home run off Cincinnati Reds pitcher Raisel Iglesias. The Cubs won that game 3–2.

On April 3, 2019, Bote signed a five-year, $15 million extension with the Cubs. He recorded his third walk-off hit, a single off of Arizona Diamondbacks pitcher Archie Bradley on April 21, 2019. On June 5, Bote had a four-hit, seven RBI game in a 9–8 win against the Colorado Rockies. He finished the 2019 season slashing .257/.362/.422 with 11 home runs and 41 RBIs over 127 games.

In the pandemic-shortened 2020 season, Bote slashed .200/.303/.408 with seven home runs and 29 RBIs in 45 games. In 2021, Bote limped to a .199/.276/.330 batting line with eight home runs and 35 RBIs in 97 games. In November 2021, following the season, Bote underwent left shoulder surgery, with an expected recovery time of six months.

Bote began the 2022 season on the 60-day injured list as he recovered from shoulder surgery, and was activated on June 24. The Cubs optioned Bote to Iowa on August 4. In 41 games for the Cubs in 2022, he batted .259/.315/.431 with four home runs and 12 RBI. On November 10, Bote was removed from the 40–man roster and sent outright to Triple–A Iowa. Bote spent the entirety of 2023 with Iowa, playing in 99 games and hitting .258/.361/.456 with 14 home runs, 61 RBI, and 7 stolen bases.

Bote began the 2024 season with Triple–A Iowa, hitting .259/.342/.546 with seven home runs and 15 RBI across 28 games. On June 2, 2024, the Cubs selected Bote's contract, adding him to their active roster. In 37 games for Chicago, he slashed .304/.333/.391 with six RBI. Bote was designated for assignment by the Cubs on August 23. He cleared waivers and was sent outright to Iowa on August 25. Bote elected free agency following the season on November 4.

=== Los Angeles Dodgers ===
On December 14, 2024, Bote signed a minor league contract with the Los Angeles Dodgers. Despite a strong spring training, Bote did not make the Dodgers major league roster and was assigned to the minor leagues. However, he spent the season on the restricted list for the Triple-A Oklahoma City Comets and did not play in any games. Bote chose to voluntarily retire rather than remain in the minor leagues, though the Dodgers retain his rights should he decide to return.

== Personal life ==
Bote is married to Rachel Bote, his high school sweetheart. The married couple have three children. Bote is a born again Christian. Bote initially wanted to become a pastor after high school. He grew up a Colorado Rockies fan.

== See also ==
- List of Major League Baseball ultimate grand slams
