= 2025 Chicago Cubs season =

2025 Chicago Cubs
- National League Wild Card winners
- League: National League
- Division: Central
- Ballpark: Wrigley Field
- City: Chicago
- Record: 92–70 (.568)
- Divisional place: 2nd
- Owners: Tom Ricketts
- President of baseball operations: Jed Hoyer
- General manager: Carter Hawkins
- Manager: Craig Counsell
- Television: Marquee Sports Network, Jon Sciambi, Jim Deshaies, Alex Cohen, Cliff Floyd, Rick Sutcliffe, Ryan Dempster
- Radio: WSCR; Chicago Cubs Radio Network; Pat Hughes, Ron Coomer, Zach Zaidman

The 2025 Chicago Cubs season was the 154th season of the Chicago Cubs franchise, the 150th in the National League, and the Cubs' 110th season at Wrigley Field. They are members of Major League Baseball's National League Central division. The Cubs began the season on March 18 with a loss to the Los Angeles Dodgers in the MLB Tokyo Series. They finished the regular season on September 28 with a win over the St. Louis Cardinals.

The Cubs started the season 37–22, their best start since their 2016 World Series-winning season. On September 17, the Cubs clinched their first playoff berth since 2020 and their first playoff appearance in a non-shortened season since 2018 after sweeping the Pittsburgh Pirates. The Dodgers clinched the NL West division with a win on September 25, assuring that the Cubs would face the San Diego Padres in the National League Wild Card Series. They finished the regular season 92–70, five games behind the Milwaukee Brewers in the division.

In the Wild Card Series, the Cubs won their first playoff series since 2017 by defeating the Padres in three games. As a result, they advanced to the Division Series where they played the top-seeded Brewers in the first I-94 rivalry matchup in the postseason history, losing the series 3–2.

The Chicago Cubs drew an average home attendance of 37,259, the 6th-highest of all MLB teams.

== Previous season ==
The Cubs finished the 2024 season 83–79 to finish in a tie for second place in the NL Central division, 10 games behind the Milwaukee Brewers. It marked the fourth consecutive season where they did not make the playoffs.

== Offseason ==
=== Coaching changes ===
On October 1, 2024, the Cubs fired hitting coach Jim Adduci, first base coach Mike Napoli, and bullpen coach Darren Holmes. On November 2, the team announced that they had promoted the team's Minor League hitting instructor, Dustin Kelly, to hitting coach. On December 6, the Cubs named Jose Javier the team's first base coach. On December 9, the team announced Mark Strittmatter would be the bullpen coach. They also named Quintin Berry third base coach and Casey Jacobson as assistant pitching coach.

=== Transactions ===
==== October 2024 ====
October 1	Activated RHP Jorge López and LHP Jordan Wicks from the 15-day injured list. Recalled RHP Daniel Palencia, OF Alexander Canario, C Caleb Knight, RHP Jack Neely, RHP Jimmy Herget, and 1B Matt Mervis from Iowa Cubs. Recalled RHP Michael Arias, RHP Gavin Hollowell, RHP Trey Wingenter, and IF Miles Mastrobuoni from ACL Cubs.
October 31	Sent C Caleb Knight outright to Iowa. RHPs Kyle Hendricks and Jorge López elected free agency.

==== November 2024 ====
November 4	Activated RHP Ben Brown, RHP Yency Almonte, IF Nick Madrigal, RHP Adbert Alzolay, RHP Colten Brewer, RHP Julian Merryweather, LHP Luke Little, and OF Brennen Davis from the 60-day injured list. Designated RHP Jimmy Herget for assignment. Claimed LHP Rob Zastryzny off waivers from Milwaukee Brewers.
November 5	Sent RHP Enoli Paredes and RHP Colten Brewer outright to Iowa. C Christian Bethancourt and LHP Drew Smyly elected free agency.
November 19	Designated RHP Adbert Alzolay and OF Brennen Davis for assignment. Selected the contract of 3B Benjamin Cowles from Knoxville Smokies. Selected the contract of OF Owen Caissie from Iowa.
November 20	Designated RHP Trey Wingenter and IF Patrick Wisdom for assignment. Traded OF Alfonsin Rosario to Cleveland Guardians for RHP Eli Morgan. Traded cash to Los Angeles Angels for C Matt Thaiss.
November 22	OF Mike Tauchman, RHP Adbert Alzolay, RHP Trey Wingenter, IF Patrick Wisdom, IF Nick Madrigal, and OF Brennen Davis elected free agency.
November 26	Signed free agent RHP Phil Bickford to a minor league contract.

==== December 2024 ====
December 7	Signed free agent LHP Matthew Boyd.
December 11	Purchased the contract of IF Gage Workman from Detroit Tigers in Rule 5 draft.
December 13	Traded IF Isaac Paredes, RHP Hayden Wesneski, and IF Cam Smith to Houston Astros for OF Kyle Tucker. Signed free agent C Carson Kelly. Signed RHP Luis Mata to a minor league contract.
December 15	Signed Free agent RHP Anhuar Garcia to a minor league contract.
December 16	Signed free agents LHP Darlin Ventura, OF Jahni McPhee, RHPs Jubrayker Salaya, Jose Urena, Geovanny Villarroel, and Anthony Feliz to minor league contracts.
December 17	Traded Cody Bellinger to New York Yankees for RHP Cody Poteet. Traded C Matt Thaiss to Chicago White Sox for cash. Signed free agent C Carlos Pérez to a minor league contract.
December 29	Traded 1B Matt Mervis to Miami Marlins for IF Vidal Bruján.
December 31	Signed free agent LHP Caleb Thielbar

==== January 2025 ====
January 4	Signed free agent Caleb Knight to a minor league contract.
January 6	Signed free agent RHP Ben Heller to a minor league contract.
January 9	Traded cash to Texas Rangers for RHP Matt Festa. Designated IF Miles Mastrobuoni for assignment.
January 12	Designated RHP Michael Arias for assignment.
January 13	Signed free agent RHP Colin Rea.
January 14	Traded Miles Mastrobuoni to Seattle Mariners for cash.
January 15	Traded RHP Michael Arias to New York Yankees for cash. Signed free agent SS Julio Acosta, C Jose Carrillo, OF Jeury Ramirez, SS Alexander Herrera, LHP Angel Sanmartin, RHP Erick Hernandez, SS Juan Tomas, RHP Salvador Burgos, SS Juan Cabada, OF Fernando Lara, P Roni Dias, RHP Amilkar Romero, SS Wilfri De La Cruz, SS Luis Santos, C Victor Garcia, OF Saul Ramirez, LHP Angel Gonzalez, OF Luis Sanchez, RHP Johansel Javier, C Abraham Sanchez, OF Breyner Figuereo, RHP Ariel Ramos, SS Luis Abreu, LHP Carlos Barrientos, LHP Frankelly Desis, SS Luis Maldonado, RHP Rafael Merchan, RHP Chaily Ramirez, RHP Jider Corpas, SS Elerick Gomez, and OF Freiker Betencourt to minor league contracts.
January 16	Signed free agent SS Luis Santos to a minor league contract.
January 19	Signed free agent RHP Trevor Richards and C Reese McGuire to minor league contracts.
January 28	Traded RHP Juan Bello to Houston Astros for RHP Ryan Pressly. Signed free agent IF Jon Berti.
January 29	Assigned RHP Brad Keller to Chicago Cubs.
January 31	Traded SS Luis Vazquez to Baltimore Orioles for cash.

==== February 2025 ====
February 3	Sent RHP Matt Festa outright to Iowa.
February 4	Traded a player to be named later to Los Angeles Dodgers for RHP Ryan Brasier. Signed free agent RHP A.J. Puckett to a minor league contract. Designated LHP Rob Zastryzny for assignment.
February 7	Invited non-roster C Carlos Pérez, 2B James Triantos, RHP Brandon Birdsell, CF Brett Bateman, RHP Ben Heller, RHP Phil Bickford, RHP Brooks Kriske, RHP Antonio Santos, 2B Matt Shaw, RHP Cade Horton, 3B Jonathon Long, LHP Riley Martin, C Moisás Ballesteros, LF Christian Franklin, C Reese McGuire, C Pablo Aliendo, and RHP Trevor Richards to spring training. Signed free agent LHP Brandon Hughes and 2B Nicky Lopez to minor league contracts and invited to spring training.
February 10	Signed free agent RHP Brayden Spears to a minor league contract.
February 11	Sent LHP Rob Zastryzny outright to Iowa.
February 12	Signed free agent IF Dixon Machado to a minor league contract.
February 14	Signed free agent IF Jaylen Palmer to a minor league contract.
February 20	Signed free agent IF Justin Turner. Designated OF Alexander Canario for assignment. Assigned LF Christian Olivo, RHP Kenten Egbert, RHP Nolan Clenney, RF Ivan Brethowr, SS Dixon Machado, RHP Cayne Ueckert, RHP Sam Armstrong, 3B Chase Strumpf, SS Reginald Preciado, RF Parker Chavers, and RHP Zac Leigh to Chicago Cubs.
February 21	OF Pete Crow-Armstrong changed number to 4. Assigned 1B Haydn McGeary assigned to Chicago Cubs, RHP Robert Kwiatkowski, 2B Hayden Cantrelle, RHP A.J. Puckett, RHP Wil Jensen, C Casey Opitz RHP Brad Deppermann, RHP Nick Hull, and RHP Tyler Santana toChicago Cubs.
February 22	Assigned SS Cristian Hernandez assigned to Chicago Cubs, RHP Connor Schultz, C Miguel Pabo, LHP Mitchell Tyranski, 3B BJ Murray Jr., and RHP Chris Kachmar to Chicago Cubs.
February 23	Assigned CF Greg Allen to Chicago Cubs.
February 24	Signed free agent OF Travis Jankowski to a minor league contract and invited to spring training.
February 25	Traded OF Alexander Canario to New York Mets. Assigned RHP Yovanny Cabrera to Chicago Cubs.
February 26	Optioned OF Owen Caissie to Iowa. Assigned SS Eriandys Ramon to Chicago Cubs.
February 27	Assigned OF Jordan Nwogu and SS Jose Escobar to Chicago Cubs.
February 28	Assigned RHP Connor Noland, C Ariel Armas, 1B Edgar Alvarez, SS Angel Cepeda, and C Ethan Hearn to Chicago Cubs.

==== March 2025 ====
March 1	Optioned RHP Cody Poteet, RHP Gavin Hollowell, RHP Jack Neely, and RHP Caleb Kilian to Iowa. Assigned LHP Jeff Belge, OF Felix Stevens, LF Joan Delgado, SS Yahil Melendez, SS Ed Howard, LF Andy Garriola, and SS Ty Southisene to Chicago Cubs.
March 3	Released LHP Jeff Beige.
March 4	Signed free agent RHP Yency Almonte to a minor league contract.
March 5	Signed free agent RHPs Jackson Kirkpatrick and RHP Ethan Bell to minor league contracts.
March 6	Assigned RHP Sam Thoresen to Chicago Cubs
March 7	Optioned LHP Luke Little and RHP Ethan Roberts to Iowa.
March 9	Optioned IF Ben Cowles to Iowa.
March 10	Assigned RF Darius Hill to Chicago Cubs.
March 11	Assigned RHP Yenrri Rojas, C Caleb Knight, and RHP Carlo Reyes to Chicago Cubs.
March 12	Released OF Travis Jankowski. Optioned OF Kevin Alcántara to Iowa.
March 23	Assigned RHP Joe Nahas and LHP Chase Watkins to Chicago Cubs.
March 24	Assigned 1B William Simoneit and RHP Ben Johnson to Chicago Cubs.
March 25	Assigned RF Rafael Morel, C Carter Trice, and SS Pedro Ramirez to Chicago Cubs.

== Regular season ==
=== Opening Day starters ===
Tuesday, March 18, 2025, vs. Los Angeles Dodgers at Tokyo Dome

Name	Pos.
Ian Happ	LF
Seiya Suzuki	DH
Kyle Tucker	RF
Michael Busch	1B
Matt Shaw	3B
Dansby Swanson	SS
Pete Crow-Armstrong	CF
Miguel Amaya	C
Jon Berti	2B
Shota Imanaga	P

=== Game log ===
Legend
	Cubs win
	Cubs loss
	Postponement
	Clinched playoff spot
**Bold**	Cubs team member

2025 Game Log: 92–70 (Home: 50–31; Road: 42–39)
March/April: 18–13 (Home: 9–7; Road: 9–6)

#	Date	Opponent	Score	Win	Loss	Save	Attendance	Record	Streak/ box
1	March 18	Dodgers*	1–4	Yamamoto (1–0)	**Brown** (0–1)	Scott (1)	42,365	0–1	L1
2	March 19	Dodgers*	3–6	Knack (1–0)	**Steele** (0–1)	Vesia (1)	42,367	0–2	L2
3	March 27	@ Diamondbacks	10–6	**Steele** (1–1)	Gallen (0–1)	—	49,070	1–2	W1
4	March 28	@ Diamondbacks	1–8	Kelly (1–0)	**Taillon** (0–1)	—	37,449	1–3	L1
5	March 29	@ Diamondbacks	4–3	**Imanaga** (1–0)	Pfaadt (0–1)	**Pressly** (1)	36,407	2–3	W1
6	March 30	@ Diamondbacks	6–10	Martínez (1–0)	**Morgan** (0–1)	—	39,145	2–4	L1
7	March 31	@ Athletics	18–3	**Brown** (1–1)	Estes (0–1)	**Rea** (1)	12,192	3–4	W1
8	April 1	@ Athletics	7–4	**Steele** (2–1)	Severino (0–1)	**Pressly** (2)	10,095	4–4	W2
9	April 2	@ Athletics	10–2	**Taillon** (1–1)	Springs (1–1)	—	9,342	5–4	W3
10	April 4	Padres	3–1	**Imanaga** (2–0)	Vásquez (0–1)	**Pressly** (3)	40,244	6–4	W4
11	April 5	Padres	7–1	**Boyd** (1–0)	Pivetta (1–1)	—	35,391	7–4	W5
12	April 6	Padres	7–8	Adam (2–0)	**Pressly** (0–1)	Suárez (4)	33,941	7–5	L1
13	April 7	Rangers	7–0	**Steele** (3–1)	Eovaldi (1–1)	—	27,017	8–5	W1
14	April 8	Rangers	10–6	**Hodge** (1–0)	Martin (0–1)	—	27,694	9–5	W2
15	April 9	Rangers	2–6	Mahle (2–0)	**Imanaga** (2–1)	—	23,590	9–6	L1
16	April 11	@ Dodgers	0–3	Yamamoto (2–1)	**Boyd** (1–1)	Scott (4)	53,933	9–7	L2
17	April 12	@ Dodgers	16–0	**Brown** (2–1)	Sasaki (0–1)	—	53,887	10–7	W1
18	April 13	@ Dodgers	4–2	**Roberts** (1–0)	Treinen (0–2)	**Pressly** (4)	50,899	11–7	W2
19	April 14	@ Padres	4–10	Morejón (1–0)	**Pearson** (0–1)	—	47,078	11–8	L1
20	April 15	@ Padres	2–1 (10)	**Pressly** (1–1)	Matsui (0–1)	**Thielbar** (1)	42,492	12–8	W1
21	April 16	@ Padres	2–4	Pivetta (3–1)	**Boyd** (1–2)	Suárez (8)	41,562	12–9	L1
22	April 18	Diamondbacks	13–11	**Pressly** (2–1)	Mantiply (0–1)	―	39,109	13–9	W1
23	April 19	Diamondbacks	6–2	**Thielbar** (1–0)	Gallen (1–3)	—	36,002	14–9	W2
24	April 20	Diamondbacks	2–3 (11)	Miller (2–0)	**Wicks** (0–1)	Jameson (1)	29,062	14–10	L1
25	April 22	Dodgers	11–10 (10)	**Hodge** (2–0)	Davis (0–1)	—	36,425	15–10	W1
26	April 23	Dodgers	7–6	**Boyd** (2–2)	Dreyer (2–1)	**Hodge** (1)	37,150	16–10	W2
27	April 25	Phillies	4–0	**Rea** (1–0)	Walker (1–2)	—	32,880	17–10	W3
28	April 26	Phillies	4–10	Luzardo (3–0)	**Brown** (2–2)	—	40,068	17–11	L1
29	April 27	Phillies	1–3 (10)	Alvarado (3–0)	**Merryweather** (0–1)	Romano (2)	35,761	17–12	L2
30	April 29	@ Pirates	9–0	**Imanaga** (3–1)	Heaney (2–2)	—	9,434	18–12	W1
31	April 30	@ Pirates	3–4	Ferguson (1–0)	**Thielbar** (1–1)	Bednar (3)	11,297	18–13	L1
*March 18 and 19 games played at Tokyo Dome in Tokyo, Japan

May: 18–9 (Home: 10–4; Road: 8–5)

#	Date	Opponent	Score	Win	Loss	Save	Attendance	Record	Streak/ box
32	May 1	@ Pirates	8–3	**Rea** (2–0)	Skenes (3–3)	—	13,633	19–13	W1
33	May 2	@ Brewers	10–0	**Brown** (3–2)	Alexander (1–3)	**Flexen** (1)	34,559	20–13	W2
34	May 3	@ Brewers	6–2	**Taillon** (2–1)	Quintana (4–1)	—	37,335	21–13	W3
35	May 4	@ Brewers	0–4	Peralta (4–2)	**Imanaga** (3–2)	—	37,360	21–14	L1
36	May 5	Giants	9–2	**Boyd** (3–2)	Roupp (2–3)	—	36,834	22–14	W1
37	May 6	Giants	5–14 (11)	Miller (2–0)	**Pressly** (2–2)	—	37,303	22–15	L1
38	May 7	Giants	1–3	Ray (5–0)	**Brown** (3–3)	Walker (7)	31,889	22–16	L2
39	May 9	@ Mets	2–7	Holmes (5–1)	**Taillon** (2–2)	—	41,243	22–17	L3
40	May 10	@ Mets	6–5	**Horton** (1–0)	Megill (3–3)	**Hodge** (2)	41,423	23–17	W1
41	May 11	@ Mets	2–6	Stanek (1–3)	**Hodge** (2–1)	—	41,673	23–18	L1
42	May 12	Marlins	5–2	**Rea** (3–0)	Quantrill (2–4)	**Pomeranz** (1)	32,271	24–18	W1
43	May 13	Marlins	5–4	**Flexen** (1–0)	Tinoco (2–1)	—	38,083	25–18	W2
44	May 14	Marlins	1–3	Weathers (1–0)	**Taillon** (2–3)	Tinoco (4)	34,167	25–19	L1
45	May 16	White Sox	13–3	**Horton** (2–0)	Smith (1–3)	—	40,171	26–19	W1
46	May 17	White Sox	7–3	**Boyd** (4–2)	Burke (2–5)	—	40,134	27–19	W2
47	May 18	White Sox	6–2	**Pomeranz** (1–0)	Cannon (2–5)	—	40,152	28–19	W3
48	May 19	@ Marlins	7–8	Bellozo (1–2)	**Palencia** (0–1)	—	9,935	28–20	L1
49	May 20	@ Marlins	14–1	**Taillon** (3–3)	Weathers (1–1)	—	9,567	29–20	W1
50	May 21	@ Marlins	2–1	**Keller** (1–0)	Bender (1–3)	**Palencia** (1)	7,482	30–20	W2
51	May 23	@ Reds	13–6	**Flexen** (2–0)	Santillan (0–1)	—	30,120	31–20	W3
52	May 24	@ Reds	4–6	Abbott (4–0)	**Rea** (3–1)	Pagán (13)	40,409	31–21	L1
53	May 25	@ Reds	11–8	**Pomeranz** (2–0)	Rogers (1–2)	**Palencia** (2)	32,823	32–21	W1
54	May 26	Rockies	3–1	**Taillon** (4–3)	Palmquist (0–3)	**Palencia** (3)	40,171	33–21	W2
55	May 27	Rockies	4–3 (11)	**Flexen** (3–0)	Kinley (0–2)	—	33,099	34–21	W3
56	May 28	Rockies	2–1	**Boyd** (5–2)	Gordon (1–2)	**Palencia** (4)	33,748	35–21	W4
57	May 30	Reds	2–6	Abbott (5–0)	**Rea** (3–2)	Pagán (14)	36,019	35–22	L1
58	May 31	Reds	2–0	**Keller** (2–0)	Ashcraft (3–4)	**Palencia** (5)	39,144	36–22	W1

June: 13–13 (Home: 6–4; Road: 7–9)

#	Date	Opponent	Score	Win	Loss	Save	Attendance	Record	Streak/ box
59	June 1	Reds	7–3	**Taillon** (5–3)	Martinez (3–6)	—	40,179	37–22	W2
60	June 3	@ Nationals	8–3	**Horton** (3–0)	Williams (3–6)	—	27,702	38–22	W3
61	June 4	@ Nationals	0–2	Gore (3–5)	**Boyd** (5–3)	Finnegan (17)	21,965	38–23	L1
62	June 5	@ Nationals	7–1	**Rea** (4–2)	Irvin (5–2)	—	30,402	39–23	W1
63	June 6	@ Tigers	1–3	Skubal (6–2)	**Brown** (3–4)	Vest (10)	40,132	39–24	L1
64	June 7	@ Tigers	6–1	**Taillon** (6–3)	Holton (2–3)	—	41,034	40–24	W1
65	June 8	@ Tigers	0–4	Flaherty (5–6)	**Horton** (3–1)	—	40,343	40–25	L1
66	June 9	@ Phillies	3–4 (11)	Hernández (1–0)	**Palencia** (0–2)	—	41,266	40–26	L2
67	June 10	@ Phillies	8–4	**Thielbar** (2–1)	Walker (2–5)	—	41,220	41–26	W1
68	June 11	@ Phillies	2–7	Luzardo (5–2)	**Brown** (3–5)	—	42,660	41–27	L1
69	June 12	Pirates	3–2	**Taillon** (7–3)	Heaney (3–5)	**Pressly** (5)	40,174	42–27	W1
70	June 13	Pirates	1–2 (10)	Santana (2–1)	**Pomeranz** (2–1)	Bednar (10)	39,457	42–28	L1
71	June 14	Pirates	2–1	**Boyd** (6–3)	Borucki (1–3)	**Palencia** (6)	39,554	43–28	W1
72	June 15	Pirates	3–2 (10)	**Flexen** (4–0)	Bednar (1–5)	—	40,162	44–28	W2
73	June 17	Brewers	5–3	**Brown** (4–5)	Patrick (3–7)	**Palencia** (7)	38,687	45–28	W3
―	June 18	Brewers	Postponed (rain); Makeup: August 18						
74	June 19	Brewers	7–8	Peralta (7–4)	**Taillon** (7–4)	Megill (16)	41,078	45–29	L1
75	June 20	Mariners	4–9	Bazardo (2–0)	**Thielbar** (2–2)	—	40,787	45–30	L2
76	June 21	Mariners	10–7	**Keller** (3–0)	Hancock (3–3)	—	39,047	46–30	W1
77	June 22	Mariners	6–14	Gilbert (2–2)	**Rea** (4–3)	—	36,185	46–31	L1
78	June 23	@ Cardinals	2–8	Liberatore (5–6)	**Brown** (4–6)	—	27,058	46–32	L2
79	June 24	@ Cardinals	7–8	Matz (4–2)	**Taillon** (7–5)	Helsley (15)	29,545	46–33	L3
80	June 25	@ Cardinals	8–0	**Boyd** (7–3)	Fedde (3–7)	—	30,399	47–33	W1
81	June 26	@ Cardinals	3–0	**Imanaga** (4–2)	Pallante (5–4)	**Palencia** (8)	32,793	48–33	W2
82	June 27	@ Astros	4–7	Walter (1–1)	**Horton** (3–2)	Hader (22)	39,451	48–34	L1
83	June 28	@ Astros	12–3	**Rea** (5–3)	McCullers Jr. (1–3)	—	39,218	49–34	W1
84	June 29	@ Astros	0–2	Valdez (9–4)	**Taillon** (7–6)	Hader (23)	37,319	49–35	L1

July: 14–10 (Home: 8–4; Road: 6–6)

#	Date	Opponent	Score	Win	Loss	Save	Attendance	Record	Streak/ box
85	July 1	Guardians	5–2	**Boyd** (8–3)	Williams (5–4)	**Palencia** (9)	38,257	50–35	W1
86	July 2	Guardians	5–4	**Imanaga** (5–2)	Bibee (4–9)	**Palencia** (10)	35,250	51–35	W2
87	July 3	Guardians	1–0 (10)	**Flexen** (5–0)	Clase (4–2)	—	38,450	52–35	W3
88	July 4	Cardinals	11–3	**Rea** (6–3)	Mikolas (4–6)	—	40,038	53–35	W4
89	July 5	Cardinals	6–8	Matz (5–2)	**Keller** (3–1)	Helsley (16)	40,119	53–36	L1
90	July 6	Cardinals	11–0	**Boyd** (9–3)	Fedde (3–9)	—	40,319	54–36	W1
91	July 8	@ Twins	1–8	Woods Richardson (5–4)	**Imanaga** (5–3)	—	30,384	54–37	L1
92	July 9	@ Twins	2–4	Festa (3–3)	**Horton** (3–3)	Durán (14)	33,470	54–38	L2
93	July 10	@ Twins	8–1	**Rea** (7–3)	Paddack (3–8)	—	34,391	55–38	W1
94	July 11	@ Yankees	0–11	Rodón (10–6)	**Flexen** (5–1)	—	46,327	55–39	L1
95	July 12	@ Yankees	5–2	**Boyd** (10–3)	Fried (11–3)	**Palencia** (11)	46,839	56–39	W1
96	July 13	@ Yankees	4–1	**Imanaga** (6–3)	Warren (6–5)	**Palencia** (12)	45,435	57–39	W2
**95th All-Star Game in Cumberland, GA**
97	July 18	Red Sox	4–1	**Rea** (8–3)	Giolito (6–2)	**Palencia** (13)	41,011	58–39	W3
98	July 19	Red Sox	6–0	**Imanaga** (7–3)	Bello (6–4)	—	40,703	59–39	W4
99	July 20	Red Sox	1–6	Crochet (11–4)	**Pressly** (2–3)	—	40,433	59–40	L1
100	July 21	Royals	4–12	Cameron (4–4)	**Brown** (4–7)	—	38,117	59–41	L2
101	July 22	Royals	6–0	**Boyd** (11–3)	Hill (0–1)	—	40,092	60–41	W1
102	July 23	Royals	4–8	Lugo (7–5)	**Rea** (8–4)	—	38,624	60–42	L1
103	July 25	@ White Sox	5–12	Houser (6–2)	**Imanaga** (7–4)	—	38,762	60–43	L2
104	July 26	@ White Sox	6–1	**Horton** (4–3)	Leasure (3–6)	—	38,432	61–43	W1
105	July 27	@ White Sox	5–4	**Brown** (5–7)	Taylor (0–2)	**Palencia** (14)	38,036	62–43	W2
106	July 28	@ Brewers	4–8	Mears (2–3)	**Boyd** (11–4)	Megill (24)	41,076	62–44	L1
107	July 29	@ Brewers	3–9	Priester (10–2)	**Rea** (8–5)	Ashby (2)	40,136	62–45	L2
108	July 30	@ Brewers	10–3	**Imanaga** (8–4)	Peralta (12–5)	—	42,807	63–45	W1

August: 15–14 (Home: 8–6; Road: 7–8)

#	Date	Opponent	Score	Win	Loss	Save	Attendance	Record	Streak/ box
109	August 1	Orioles	1–0	**Horton** (5–3)	Rogers (4–2)	**Palencia** (15)	40,520	64–45	W2
110	August 2	Orioles	3–4	Wolfram (2–0)	**Thielbar** (2–3)	Akin (1)	40,781	64–46	L1
111	August 3	Orioles	5–3	**Palencia** (1–2)	Akin (3–1)	—	39,430	65–46	W1
112	August 4	Reds	2–3	Barlow (5–0)	**Brasier** (0–1)	Pagán (24)	37,937	65–47	L1
113	August 5	Reds	1–5	Littell (9–8)	**Kittredge** (2–3)	—	39,797	65–48	L2
114	August 6	Reds	6–1	**Horton** (6–3)	Abbott (8–2)	—	37,648	66–48	W1
115	August 8	@ Cardinals	0–5	McGreevy (4–2)	**Boyd** (11–5)	—	33,453	66–49	L1
116	August 9	@ Cardinals	9–1	**Rea** (9–5)	Pallante (6–9)	—	40,048	67–49	W1
117	August 10	@ Cardinals	2–3	Gray (11–5)	**Imanaga** (8–5)	Romero (3)	30,540	67–50	L1
118	August 12	@ Blue Jays	1–5	Berríos (9–4)	**Assad** (0–1)	—	43,003	67–51	L2
119	August 13	@ Blue Jays	4–1	**Horton** (7–3)	Gausman (8–9)	**Palencia** (16)	43,120	68–51	W1
120	August 14	@ Blue Jays	1–2	Scherzer (3–2)	**Boyd** (11–6)	Hoffman (27)	43,270	68–52	L1
121	August 15	Pirates	2–3	Santana (4–4)	**Palencia** (1–3)	—	40,044	68–53	L2
122	August 16	Pirates	3–1	**Kittredge** (3–3)	Sisk (0–1)	**Keller** (1)	40,062	69–53	W1
123	August 17	Pirates	4–3	**Thielbar** (3–3)	Mattson (3–2)	**Kittredge** (1)	38,012	70–53	W2
124	August 18 (1)	Brewers	0–7	Peralta (15–5)	**Horton** (7–4)	—	38,971	70–54	L1
―	August 18 (2)	Brewers	Postponed (rain); Makeup: August 19						
125	August 19 (1)	Brewers	6–4	**Boyd** (12–6)	Patrick (3–8)	**Palencia** (17)	33,103	71–54	W1
126	August 19 (2)	Brewers	4–1	**Taillon** (8–6)	Woodruff (4–1)	**Kittredge** (2)	34,540	72–54	W2
127	August 20	Brewers	4–3	**Rea** (10–5)	Misiorowski (4–2)	**Palencia** (18)	36,327	73–54	W3
128	August 21	Brewers	1–4	Mears (5–3)	**Imanaga** (8–6)	Megill (30)	37,850	73–55	L1
129	August 22	@ Angels	3–2	**Keller** (4–1)	Jansen (5–4)	**Palencia** (19)	39,872	74–55	W1
130	August 23	@ Angels	12–1	**Horton** (8–4)	Mederos (0–2)	**Brown** (1)	44,355	75–55	W2
131	August 24	@ Angels	4–3	**Taillon** (9–6)	Hendricks (6–9)	**Palencia** (20)	41,206	76–55	W3
132	August 26	@ Giants	2–5	Verlander (2–10)	**Boyd** (12–7)	Walker (12)	35,060	76–56	L1
133	August 27	@ Giants	3–12	Whisenhunt (2–1)	**Rea** (10–6)	—	30,457	76–57	L2
134	August 28	@ Giants	3–4	Walker (5–4)	**Palencia** (1–4)	—	32,187	76–58	L3
135	August 29	@ Rockies	11–7	**Horton** (9–4)	Márquez (3–12)	—	33,747	77–58	W1
136	August 30	@ Rockies	4–3	**Assad** (1–1)	Brown (0–2)	**Palencia** (21)	47,349	78–58	W2
137	August 31	@ Rockies	5–6	Mejía (2–1)	**Palencia** (1–5)	—	40,264	78–59	L1

September: 14–11 (Home: 9–6; Road: 5–5)

#	Date	Opponent	Score	Win	Loss	Save	Attendance	Record	Streak/ box
138	September 1	Braves	7–6 (10)	**Kittredge** (4–3)	Brebbia (1–1)	—	39,673	79–59	W1
139	September 2	Braves	4–3	**Imanaga** (9–6)	Wentz (5–5)	**Palencia** (22)	32,618	80–59	W2
140	September 3	Braves	1–5	Elder (6–9)	**Brown** (5–8)	—	31,933	80–60	L1
141	September 5	Nationals	11–5	**Assad** (2–1)	Irvin (8–11)	―	32,320	81–60	W1
142	September 6	Nationals	1–2	Lord (5–8)	**Boyd** (12–8)	Henry (2)	38,011	81–61	L1
143	September 7	Nationals	3–6	Thompson (1–0)	**Palencia** (1–6)	Ferrer (7)	33,343	81–62	L2
144	September 8	@ Braves	1–4	Elder (7–9)	**Imanaga** (9–7)	Iglesias (25)	33,430	81–63	L3
145	September 9	@ Braves	6–1	**Horton** (10–4)	Strider (5–13)	—	32,721	82–63	W1
146	September 10	@ Braves	3–2	**Rogers** (3–2)	Sale (5–5)	**Kittredge** (3)	35,757	83–63	W2
147	September 12	Rays	6–4	**Boyd** (13–8)	Baz (9–12)	**Kittredge** (4)	38,794	84–63	W3
148	September 13	Rays	4–5	Baker (4–4)	**Keller** (4–2)	Fairbanks (26)	39,712	84–64	L1
149	September 14	Rays	4–3	**Assad** (3–1)	Uceta (9–3)	**Kittredge** (5)	37,186	85–64	W1
150	September 15	@ Pirates	4–0	**Taillon** (10–6)	Ashcraft (4–3)	**Keller** (2)	15,706	86–64	W2
151	September 16	@ Pirates	4–1	**Horton** (11–4)	Skenes (10–10)	**Keller** (3)	14,714	87–64	W3
152	September 17	@ Pirates	8–4	**Civale** (4–9)	Ramírez (1–3)	—	13,488	88–64	W4
153	September 18	@ Reds	0–1	Greene (7–4)	**Rea** (10–7)	—	18,532	88–65	L1
154	September 19	@ Reds	4–7	Phillips (4–0)	**Hodge** (2–2)	Pagán (28)	25,584	88–66	L2
155	September 20	@ Reds	3–6	Littell (10–8)	**Pomeranz** (2–2)	Pagán (29)	31,756	88–67	L3
156	September 21	@ Reds	0–1	Martinez (11–13)	**Taillon** (10–7)	Santillan (7)	29,661	88–68	L4
157	September 23	Mets	7–9	Raley (3–0)	**Thielbar** (3–4)	Díaz (27)	35,729	88–69	L5
158	September 24	Mets	10–3	**Boyd** (14–8)	Tong (2–3)	**Civale** (1)	35,060	89–69	W1
159	September 25	Mets	5–8	McLean (5–1)	**Imanaga** (9–8)	Díaz (28)	38,465	89–70	L1
160	September 26	Cardinals	12–1	**Rea** (11–7)	Mikolas (8–11)	—	35,611	90–70	W1
161	September 27	Cardinals	7–3	**Taillon** (11–7)	McGreevy (8–4)	―	38,035	91–70	W2
162	September 28	Cardinals	2–0	**Assad** (4–1)	King (2–1)	**Wicks** (1)	37,497	92–70	W3

=== Season standings ===
==== National League Central ====
NL Central
Team	W	L	Pct.	GB	Home	Road
Milwaukee Brewers	97	65	.599	—	52‍–‍29	45‍–‍36
Chicago Cubs	92	70	.568	5	50‍–‍31	42‍–‍39
Cincinnati Reds	83	79	.512	14	45‍–‍36	38‍–‍43
St. Louis Cardinals	78	84	.481	19	44‍–‍37	34‍–‍47
Pittsburgh Pirates	71	91	.438	26	44‍–‍37	27‍–‍54

==== National League Wild Card ====
Division leaders
Team	W	L	Pct.
Milwaukee Brewers	97	65	.599
Philadelphia Phillies	96	66	.593
Los Angeles Dodgers	93	69	.574

Wild Card teams (Top 3 teams qualify for postseason)
Team	W	L	Pct.	GB
Chicago Cubs	92	70	.568	+9
San Diego Padres	90	72	.556	+7
Cincinnati Reds	83	79	.512	—
New York Mets	83	79	.512	—
San Francisco Giants	81	81	.500	2
Arizona Diamondbacks	80	82	.494	3
Miami Marlins	79	83	.488	4
St. Louis Cardinals	78	84	.481	5
Atlanta Braves	76	86	.469	7
Pittsburgh Pirates	71	91	.438	12
Washington Nationals	66	96	.407	17
Colorado Rockies	43	119	.265	40

==== Record vs. opponents ====
===== Record vs. National League =====
2025 National League record Source: MLB Standings Grid – 2025
Team	AZ	ATL	CHC	CIN	COL	LAD	MIA	MIL	NYM	PHI	PIT	SD	SF	STL	WSH	AL
Arizona	—	4–2	3–4	2–4	8–5	6–7	3–3	4–3	3–3	3–3	2–4	5–8	7–6	3–3	2–4	25–23
Atlanta	2–4	—	2–4	5–2	4–2	1–5	8–5	2–4	8–5	5–8	2–4	1–6	1–5	4–2	9–4	22–26
Chicago	4–3	4–2	—	5–8	5–1	4–3	4–2	7–6	2–4	2–4	10–3	3–3	1–5	8–5	3–3	30–18
Cincinnati	4–2	2–5	8–5	—	5–1	1–5	3–4	5–8	4–2	3–3	7–6	4–2	3–3	6–7	2–4	26–22
Colorado	5–8	2–4	1–5	1–5	—	2–11	3–3	2–4	0–6	0–7	2–4	3–10	2–11	4–2	4–3	12–36
Los Angeles	7–6	5–1	3–4	5–1	11–2	—	5–1	0–6	3–4	2–4	2–4	9–4	9–4	2–4	3–3	27–21
Miami	3–3	5–8	2–4	4–3	3–3	1–5	—	3–3	7–6	4–9	4–3	3–3	4–2	3–3	7–6	26–22
Milwaukee	3–4	4–2	6–7	8–5	4–2	6–0	3–3	—	4–2	4–2	10–3	2–4	2–5	7–6	6–0	28–20
New York	3–3	5–8	4–2	2–4	6–0	4–3	6–7	2–4	—	7–6	2–4	2–4	4–2	5–2	7–6	24–24
Philadelphia	3–3	8–5	4–2	3–3	7–0	4–2	9–4	2–4	6–7	—	3–3	3–3	3–4	2–4	8–5	31–17
Pittsburgh	4–2	4–2	3–10	6–7	4–2	4–2	3–4	3–10	4–2	3–3	—	1–5	4–2	7–6	4–3	17–31
San Diego	8–5	6–1	3–3	2–4	10–3	4–9	3–3	4–2	4–2	3–3	5–1	—	10–3	4–3	4–2	20–28
San Francisco	6–7	5–1	5–1	3–3	11–2	4–9	2–4	5–2	2–4	4–3	2–4	3–10	—	2–4	3–3	24–24
St. Louis	3–3	2–4	5–8	7–6	2–4	4–2	3–3	6–7	2–5	4–2	6–7	3–4	4–2	—	5–1	22–26
Washington	4–2	4–9	3–3	4–2	3–4	3–3	6–7	0–6	6–7	5–8	3–4	2–4	3–3	1–5	—	19–29

Updated with the results of all games through September 28, 2025.

===== Record vs. American League =====
2025 National League record vs. American League Source: MLB Standings
Team	ATH	BAL	BOS	CWS	CLE	DET	HOU	KC	LAA	MIN	NYY	SEA	TB	TEX	TOR
Arizona	2–1	2–1	2–1	2–1	2–1	0–3	0–3	1–2	1–2	2–1	2–1	3–0	1–2	4–2	1–2
Atlanta	1–2	0–3	3–3	2–1	3–0	3–0	1–2	1–2	1–2	3–0	1–2	1–2	1–2	0–3	1–2
Chicago	3–0	2–1	2–1	5–1	3–0	1–2	1–2	1–2	3–0	1–2	2–1	1–2	2–1	2–1	1–2
Cincinnati	0–3	2–1	1–2	1–2	5–1	2–1	1–2	2–1	2–1	2–1	2–1	1–2	3–0	1–2	1–2
Colorado	1–2	1–2	0–3	1–2	1–2	0–3	2–4	0–3	2–1	2–1	1–2	0–3	1–2	0–3	0–3
Los Angeles	2–1	1–2	1–2	3–0	2–1	3–0	0–3	2–1	0–6	2–1	2–1	3–0	2–1	2–1	2–1
Miami	1–2	2–1	1–2	1–2	1–2	2–1	1–2	2–1	2–1	2–1	3–0	1–2	3–3	3–0	1–2
Milwaukee	2–1	2–1	3–0	2–1	1–2	2–1	2–1	2–1	3–0	4–2	0–3	2–1	1–2	0–3	2–1
New York	2–1	1–2	1–2	2–1	0–3	2–1	1–2	2–1	3–0	1–2	3–3	2–1	0–3	1–2	3–0
Philadelphia	2–1	2–1	2–1	1–2	2–1	2–1	0–3	2–1	1–2	2–1	2–1	3–0	3–0	3–0	4–2
Pittsburgh	2–1	0–3	2–1	0–3	0–3	4–2	1–2	0–3	2–1	1–2	1–2	0–3	1–2	1–2	2–1
San Diego	2–1	0–3	2–1	2–1	3–0	1–2	1–2	2–1	2–1	1–2	1–2	1–5	0–3	2–1	0–3
San Francisco	5–1	2–1	2–1	1–2	1–2	0–3	3–0	1–2	1–2	0–3	2–1	3–0	1–2	2–1	0–3
St. Louis	2–1	2–1	0–3	3–0	3–0	1–2	2–1	3–3	1–2	3–0	0–3	0–3	1–2	1–2	0–3
Washington	1–2	5–1	0–3	1–2	1–2	2–1	1–2	1–2	2–1	2–1	0–3	2–1	0–3	1–2	0–3

Updated with the results of all games through September 28, 2025.

=== Season summary ===
==== February ====
- **February 19** – The Cubs announced that Shota Imanaga would be the Opening Day starter.
- **February 28** – The Cubs announced that Nico Hoerner would not make the trip to Japan for the season opener as he was still recovering from surgery performed near the end of the prior season.

==== March ====
- **March 18** – The Cubs opened the season with a two-game series in Tokyo, Japan against the defending World Champion Los Angeles Dodgers. The games were played at Tokyo Dome. Shota Imanaga pitched four scoreless innings, but walked four. Miguel Amaya doubled in the second to give the Cubs a 1–0 lead. Ben Brown relieved Imanaga in the fifth and promptly gave up three runs. The Dodgers added an insurance run in the ninth as the Cubs lost 4–1.
- **March 19** – In game two in Tokyo, Justin Steele allowed five runs in four innings of work. Kyle Tucker drove in his first run as a Cub on bases loaded walk in the third, while Ian Happ and Dansby Swanson each drove in a run. However, it was not enough as the Cubs allowed three homers in the game and lost to the Dodgers 6–3.
- **March 27** – The Cubs returned to the United States to face the Arizona Diamondbacks in Phoenix for game three on the season on March 27. Miguel Amaya doubled twice and drove in five runs while Ian Happ homered and drove in three runs. Justin Steele allowed three runs in five innings of work to earn the win. The Cub bullpen allowed three runs, but it was enough as the Cubs held on to win 10–6, marking their first win of the season.
- **March 28** – In game two against the D-Backs, Jameson Taillon allowed six runs in six innings. The Cub offense only managed one run as the Cubs were blown out 8–1.
- **March 29** – Shota Imanaga allowed one run in seven innings of work and left with a 3–1 lead on Kyle Tucker's first homer as a Cub. Matt Shaw added a pinch-hit homer in the eighth, his first career home run, as the Cubs went to the ninth leading 4–1. New closer Ryan Pressly gave up a two-run homer in the ninth and Arizona had the tying run at second before Dansby Swanson made a great defensive play to end the game. The win moved the Cubs to 2–3 on the season.
- **March 30** – In the finale of the series in Arizona, Matthew Boyd threw five scoreless innings. Dansby Swanson, Seiya Suzuki, and Kyle Tucker homered for the Cubs to give them a 6–2 lead going to the bottom of the eighth. In the eighth, three Cub relievers allowed eight runs as the Diamondbacks rallied to win 10–6.
- **March 31** – The Cubs next traveled to face the Athletics for the first major league game at the A's temporary stadium, Sutter Health Park, in West Sacramento, California. Ben Brown allowed three runs in five innings of work while the Cub bullpen held the A's scoreless. That was more than enough for the offense as the Cubs scored 18 runs to win 18–3. Carson Kelly hit for the cycle, becoming the first Cub to do so since Mark Grace in 1993. Kyle Tucker had four hits including a homer as Michael Busch and Dansby Swanson also homered in the win. Busch drove in four runs while Kelly drove in five in the win. The win moved the Cubs to 3–4 on the season.

==== April ====
- **April 1** – Justin Steele allowed four runs in 6.2 innings of work and the Cub bullpen again combined to hold the A's scoreless. Seiya Suzuki hit a three-run homer in the first and Kyle Tucker added a solo shot in the third, his fourth straight game with a home run. Justin Turner got his first hit as a Cub and drove in a run as the Cubs beat the A's 7–4. Ryan Pressly allowed one hit in the ninth, but held on to earn his second save of the season.
- **April 2** – In the finale of the series against the A's, Seiya Suzuki homered twice and drove in five runs. Matt Shaw had two hits and drove in two runs as the Cubs won again 10–2. Jameson Taillon allowed two runs in six innings and the Cub bullpen again did not allow a run for the win. The Cubs moved to 5–4, the first time over .500 on the season.
- **April 4** – After an off day, the Cubs had their home opener at Wrigley Field against the undefeated San Diego Padres. Shota Imanaga pitched 7.1 innings of scoreless ball while Justin Turner and Nico Hoerner drove in a run to give the Cubs a 3–1 lead in the ninth. Ryan Pressly allowed two baserunners, but was able to get out of the jam without allowing a run as the Cubs won. Ian Happ had two hits and scored two runs in the win.
- **April 5** – In game two against the Padres, Carson Kelly homered and drove in four runs while Matthew Boyd threw six scoreless innings. The Cub bullpen gave up only one run as the Cubs won their fifth straight game 7–1.
- **April 6** – In the finale of the three-game series, the Cubs took a 7–3 lead after two innings on the strength of a Kyle Tucker home run. However, the Cub offense failed to add on and the Padres tied the game in the eighth. In the ninth, an error by first baseman Justin Turner allowed the go-ahead run to score as the Cubs lost 8–7. Ben Brown allowed five runs in four innings of work in the loss. The loss dropped the Cubs to 7–5 on the season.
- **April 7** – The 8–2 Texas Rangers next visited Wrigley Field. In a game where temperatures were in the 30s, Justin Steele pitched seven scoreless innings. The Cub offense scored seven runs and the team ran wild on the bases, stealing five. Ian Happ drove in three runs in the easy 7–0 win.
- **April 8** – In the second game against the Rangers, Jameson Taillon allowed three runs in six innings. Taillon left the game with a 6–3 lead on a homer and sacrifice fly by Dansby Swanson. Two-RBI singles by Seiya Suzuki and Niko Hoerner gave the Cubs the lead. However, the Cub bullpen quickly squandered the lead allowing three runs in the seventh. With the game tied in the eighth, Swanson drove in two more runs on a single while Pete Crow Armstrong did the same. Ryan Pressly pitched the ninth to complete the 10–6 win. The win marked the team's seventh in eight games and moved them to 9–5 on the season.
- **April 9** – In the finale of the series against the Rangers, Shota Imanaga allowed five runs, four of them in the fifth inning, as the Cubs lost 6–2. Seiya Suzuki and Michael Bush each drove in a run in the loss.
- **April 11** – After an off day, the Cubs faced the Dodgers in Los Angeles. Matthew Boyd threw six innings and allowed three runs while the Cub bullpen held the Dodgers at three. The Cub offense could not push across a run as they lost 3–0.
- **April 12** – Ben Brown allowed five hits, but no runs in six innings of work. The Cubs led by two entering the seventh on a Michael Busch homer and an RBI single by Justin Turner. However, the Cubs scored five in the seventh, four in the eighth, and five more in the ninth to blow the game open and win 16–0 over the Dodgers. Bush had four hits and drove in four runs while Carson Kelly homered twice and drove in three. Seiya Suzuki left the game in the fifth with an injury. The win moved the Cubs to 10–7 on the season.
- **April 13** – Pete Crow-Armstrong homered twice while Michael Busch also homered on Sunday Night Baseball against the Dodgers. Prior to the game, the Cubs disclosed that Justin Steele would miss the rest of the season and would require arm surgery. Colin Rea got the start for the Cubs and allowed only one run in 3.2 innings of work. Six Cub relievers allowed only one more run as the Cubs won 4–2. The win kept the Cubs in first place in the Central division standings.
- **April 14** – With Carson Kelly and Seiya Suzuki still unable to play, the Cubs took the lead against the Padres in San Diego on a Michael Busch two-run homer and a Pete Crow-Armstrong RBI double. Jameson Taillon pitched 5.1 innings while allowing two runs. The Cub bullpen imploded, however, surrendering eight runs as the Cubs lost 10–4.
- **April 15** – Shota Imanaga allowed one run, an unearned run on a homer by Manny Machado, after two fly balls were dropped in foul territory by Kyle Tucker and Gage Workman. The Cubs tied it in the sixth on a sacrifice bunt by Pete Crow-Armstrong. The game remained tied into the 10th, when Nico Hoerner led off the inning with a triple to score the Manfred runner. Caleb Thielbar pitched a scoreless bottom of the 10th to secure the 2–1 win. The win ended the Padres 12-game home winning streak and move the Cubs 12–8 on the season.
- **April 16** – In the finale against the Padres, Matthew Boyd allowed two runs in 5.1 innings of work. The Cub bullpen surrendered two more runs as the Cubs lost 4–2. Carson Kelly and Seiya Suzuki returned to the lineup for the Cubs while Pete Crow-Armstrong homered in the game, his third on the road trip and third of the season. With the loss, the Cubs remained one game ahead of the Milwaukee Brewers in the Central division standings.
- **April 18** – After an off day, the Cubs welcomed the Diamondbacks to Wrigley for a three-game series. Colin Rea allowed only one run on five hits in 4.2 innings and the Cubs held a 2–1 lead going into the bottom of the seventh. In the seventh, Ian Happ hit a grand slam and Michael Bush drove in a run to give the Cubs a 7–1 lead that appeared to put the game out of reach. However, the Diamondbacks answered in the eighth as Eugenio Suárez hit a grand slam as part of a 10-run inning to give the D-Backs an 11–7 lead. In the bottom of the eighth, Carson Kelly hit his second homer of the game, a three-run shot, to bring the score to 11–10. Kyle Tucker gave the Cubs the lead three batters later with a two-run homer and Seiya Suzuki added a solo home run to push the lead to 13–11. The 16 runs in an inning were the most in any inning in Wrigley Field history. Ryan Pressly pitched a scoreless ninth for the win.
- **April 19** – Ben Brown pitched four innings while walking four, allowing three hits, and one run. Kyle Tucker and Michael Busch drove in runs in the bottom of the first to give the Cubs a 2–1 lead. Another RBI by Tucker and back-to-back homers by Seiya Suzuki and Michael Busch pushed the lead to 6–1. The Cub bullpen surrendered only one run as they notched their 14th win of the season.
- **April 20** – In the finale of the series on Easter Sunday, the game was delayed twice by rain. Jameson Taillon allowed one run in five innings and the Cubs only managed one run on a Michael Busch RBI single. With the game tied at one in extra innings, both the Diamondbacks and Cubs scored the Manfred runner in the 10th. In the 11th, The D-Backs also scored the Manfred runner to push the lead to 3–2. In the bottom of the 11th, Ian Happ lined into a double play and Kyle Tucker flied out as the Cubs lost 3–2. The loss dropped them to 14–10 on the season with a one-game lead in the division.
- **April 22** – After an off day, the Dodgers visited for a brief two-game series. Shota Imanaga allowed five runs, two earned, in 5.2 innings. Trailing by three in the bottom of the first, the Cubs scored five runs to take the lead on RBI base hits by Seiya Suzuki, Dansby Swanson, Pete Crow-Armstrong, and Miguel Amaya. Crow-Armstrong hit a two-run homer in the fifth and the Cubs led 7–5 after six innings. The Dodgers retook the lead in the seventh, scoring five runs to take a 10–7 lead. In the eighth, Kyle Tucker hit a two-run homer to narrow the lead to one. With two outs in the bottom of the ninth, Amaya hit a home run into the basket in left field to tie the game. The Cubs prevented the Manfred runner from scoring in the 10th and Ian Happ singled to score the winning run on the first pitch of the bottom of the 10th to give the Cubs the 11–10 win.
- **April 23** – In the finale of the season series against the Dodgers, the Cubs fell behind 2–0 before Pete Crow-Armstrong hit a three-run homer in the 4th to give the Cubs a 3–2 lead. The Dodgers retook the lead in the fifth, but the Cubs answered in the bottom of the fifth, scoring three runs on a sacrifice fly by Nico Hoerner and RBI singles by Dansby Swanson and Crow-Armstrong. The Dodgers narrowed the lead to one in the sixth, but the Cub bullpen held them scoreless for the final three innings as the Cubs won 7–6. The four RBIs were a career-high for Crow-Armstrong. The win moved the Cubs to 16–10 on the season and gave them a 2.5 game lead in the division.
- **April 25** – After an off day, the Philadelphia Phillies came to Chicago to face the Cubs. The start of the game was delayed more than two hours due to rain. Colin Rea pitched five scoreless innings and the Cub bullpen shut out the Phillies for the remainder of the game. With the wind blowing in, the Cubs pushed across four runs for the 4–0 win.
- **April 26** – In the second game of the series against the Phillies, Ben Brown allowed six runs, all in the fourth, as the Cubs were blown out 10–4. Seiya Suzuki drove in three runs in the loss which dropped the Cubs to 17–11 on the season.
- **April 27** – In the finale of the series against the Phillies, Jameson Taillon allowed only one run in seven innings. The Cubs only managed one run on a Pete Crow-Armstrong RBI double and the game went to extras innings tied at one. Julian Merryweather walked three in the 10th and gave up a sacrifice fly to give the Phillies a 2–1 lead. Another run scored when Vidal Bruján did not hurry a throw to first which Trea Turner beat out to push the lead to 3–1. The Cubs failed to score in the 10th and lost their second straight game.
- **April 29** – After an off day, the Cubs travelled to Pittsburgh to play the Pirates. Shota Imanaga pitched five scoreless innings, but left in the sixth with leg cramps. Meanwhile, the Cubs pounded out nine runs on four homers as they beat the Pirates 9–0. Carson Kelly had three hits, including a home run, and drove in three runs.
- **April 30** – Matthew Boyd allowed five runs in five innings, but left with a 3–2 lead on RBIs by Ian Happ and Kyle Tucker. A wild pitch scored Happ in the fifth to give the Cubs the lead. In the seventh, a ball that ricocheted off the leg of a diving Dansby Swanson scored two runs as the Pirates rallied to win 4–3. The loss dropped the Cubs to 18–13 on the season and was their third loss in four games. During the game, a man fell from the outfield seats on to the warning track which resulted in a delay in play as medical teams were on the field to care for the man.

==== May ====
- **May 1** – In the finale of the three-game series against the Pirates, the Cubs trailed 2–0 entering the fifth. The Cubs hit three solo home runs off Pirate pitcher Paul Skenes in the fifth – homers by Dansby Swanson, Kyle Tucker, and Seiya Suzuki – to take a 3–2 lead. Suzuki homered again in the seventh, a two-run shot, to push the lead to 5–2. The Cubs added to the lead in the ninth to win 8–3.
- **May 2** – The Cubs traveled to Milwaukee, Wisconsin to face the Brewers for the first time. The Cubs jumped out to an early 2–0 lead in the first and then added seven runs in the second. Michael Busch hit his first career grand slam while Pete Crow-Armstrong homered twice in the blowout. Ben Brown and Chris Flexen combined to shut out the Brewers 10–0. The win moved the Cubs to 20–13 on the season.
- **May 3** – In game two against the Brewers, Jameson Taillon allowed two runs in six innings. With the game tied at one in the fourth, Pete Crow-Armstrong hit a three- run homer and Dansby Swanson followed with a solo home run to give the Cubs the lead. The Cubs held to win 6–2 and move a season-high eight games over .500 on the season.
- **May 4** – Shota Imanaga allowed two runs and left the game in the sixth inning with a hamstring issue. Julian Merryweather allowed two runs to score in just 1/3 of an inning in relief as the Cubs were shut out 4–0. The loss left the Cubs three games ahead of the Reds in the Central division.
- **May 5** – The San Francisco Giants next came to Wrigley to face the Cubs. Ian Happ hit a two-run homer in the third, but Matthew Boyd surrendered the lead in the top of the fourth. The Cubs retook the lead in the bottom of the fourth on a two-RBI single by Dansby Swanson. Carson Kelly homered as part of a five-run sixth to blow the game open. Boyd allowed just the two runs in six innings and the Cub bullpen shut out the Giants as the Cubs won 9–2. The win moved the Cubs to 22–14 on the season, four games ahead of the Brewers and Reds in the division.
- **May 6** – In game two against the Giants, Colin Rea allowed five runs in five innings as the Cubs fell behind 5–3. Still trailing by the same score in the bottom of the ninth, the Cubs rallied to tie the game on an RBI pinch-hit single by Justin Turner and an RBI single by Kyle Tucker. In the 10th, both teams failed to score their Manfred runner. Ryan Pressly started the 11th and allowed five hits and nine runs without getting an out. As a result, the Cubs lost 14–5.
- **May 7** – In the finale of the series against the Giants, Ben Brown allowed three runs in five innings. However, the Cub offense managed only one run as they lost 3–1. The loss dropped the Cubs 22–16 on the season, but they remained three games ahead of second place in the division.
- **May 9** – After an off day, the Cubs traveled to Citi Field in New York to face the Mets. Jameson Taillon allowed six runs, five earned in four innings of work. Kyle Tucker and Michael Busch hit solo home runs for the Cubs, but they lost 7–2.
- **May 10** – In game two against the Mets, the Cubs used an opener to ease top prospect Cade Horton's MLB debut. Horton entered in the second inning with the Cubs ahead 2–0 on RBI singled by Seiya Suzuki and Dansby Swanson. The Cubs pushed the lead to 4–0 with an RBI single by Michael Busch in the third and a Swanson solo home run in the fourth. Horton allowed a three-run homer in the bottom of the fourth to narrow the lead. Miguel Amaya drove in two runs in the eighth to restore the lead to three before Julian Merryweather allowed a two-run homer. However, Porter Hodge pitched the ninth for the save as the Cubs won 6–5.
- **May 11** – In the finale of the series in New York, Matthew Boyd allowed two runs in six innings, but left trailing 2–1 on the strength of a Pete Crow-Armstrong homer. A Nico Hoerner double in the seventh tied the game at two. However Porter Hodge allowed three runs in the eighth as the Cubs lost 6–2. The loss dropped the Cubs to 23–18 with a one-game lead in the division.
- **May 12** – Returning to Wrigley to face the Miami Marlins, Colin Rea pitched six scoreless innings before allowing a two-run home run in the seventh. Dansby Swanson and Seiya Suzuki each hit a two-run homer in the fifth as the Cubs won 5–2.
- **May 13** – Ben Brown pitched 5.1 innings and allowed two runs. Pete Crow-Armstrong homered in the third inning and drove in another run on a sacrifice fly in the fifth to tie the game at two. Julian Merryweather allowed two runs in the seventh and the Cubs entered the bottom of the ninth trailing 4–2. Nico Hoerner singled to score a run and narrow the lead to one before Justin Turner hit a walk-off two-run double to give the Cubs the 5–4 comeback win. The win moved the Cubs to 25–18 on the season and moved them 1.5 games ahead in first place in the division.
- **May 14** – In the finale of the series against the Marlins, Jameson Taillon allowed three solo home runs while the Cubs only run came on a solo home run by Seiya Suzuki. That was all the scoring as the Cubs lost 3–1.
- **May 16** – After an off day, the Cubs faced their crosstown rival, the Chicago White Sox, at Wrigley. Cade Horton, making his first official start, gave up two runs in the first before the Cubs scored six in the second to take the lead for good. Pete Crow-Armstrong hit a three-run homer and drove in a career-high six runs. Seiya Suzuki and rookie Moisés Ballesteros each drove in two as the Cubs blew out the White Sox 13–3. The win moved the Cubs to 26–19 on the season.
- **May 17** – In game two against the White Sox, Pete Crow-Armstrong drove in two more runs on two hits while Dansby Swanson hit his 10th home run of the season. Matthew Boyd allowed three runs in six innings as the Cubs won 7–3. Miguel Amaya also drove in two runs in the win.
- **May 18** – In the final game of the three-game series against the White Sox, Colin Rea allowed one run in 5.1 innings of work. Seiya Suzuki drove in two runs while the Cubs pounded out 10 hits. The Cub bullpen allowed only one run in 3.2 innings of work and the Cubs swept the White Sox, winning 6–2. The win moved the Cubs to 28–19 on the season and pushed their lead to two games in the division.
- **May 19** – The Cubs next traveled to Miami, Florida to face the Marlins. The Cubs fell behind early as Ben Brown allowed two runs in the first. Miguel Amaya gave the Cubs the lead in the fourth with a three-run home run. The Marlins retook the lead off of Brown by scoring four in the fifth. The Cubs rallied again in the sixth, scoring four runs on an infield single by Moisés Ballesteros, a two-run double by Amaya, and a double by Matt Shaw. The Cubs held the lead at 7–6 into the ninth before Daniel Palencia allowed a two-run triple with two outs as the Marlins won 8–7.
- **May 20** – The Cubs took an early lead on a solo home run by Kyle Tucker and blew the game open with eight runs in the sixth as they routed the Marlins 14–1. Jameson Taillon allowed one run in seven innings of work for the win. Seiya Suzuki homered and drove in four runs while both Tucker and Suzuki had three hits in the game. The win moved the Cubs back to nine games over .500 and gave them a two-game lead in the division.
- **May 21** – In the finale of the series against the Marlins, Cade Horton allowed only one run in 5.1 innings and the Cub bullpen held the Marlins scoreless. Kyle Tucker homered in the first and singled to score the winning run in the eighth as the Cubs won 2–1.
- **May 23** – After an off day, the Cubs visited the Cincinnati Reds at Great American Ball Park. Matthew Boyd allowed four runs in the first four innings and Julian Merryweather allowed two more in 2/3 of an inning. With the Cubs trailing 6–2 in the seventh, Kyle Tucker drove in a run with a single and Pete Crow-Armstrong hit a grand slam to give the Cubs an 8–6 lead. Seiya Suzuki and Dansby Swanson added homers as the Cubs won 13–6. Crow-Armstrong hit two homers in the game and drove in six runs in the win. The win moved the Cubs 31–20 on the season.
- **May 24** – In game two against the Reds, Colin Rea allowed six runs in five innings. Justin Turner and Carson Kelly each hit a home run, but it was not enough as the Cubs lost 6–4.
- **May 25** – In the series finale against the Reds, the Cubs again trailed, falling behind 8–3 as Ben Brown struggled in 4.1 innings. However, once again the Cubs rallied, scoring one in sixth, one in the seventh, and taking the lead on newly acquired Reese McGuire's second home run of the game in the eighth. Seiya Suzuki followed with a three-run homer to give the Cubs the 11–8 win.
- **May 26** – The Cubs returned to Wrigley for a three-game series against the Colorado Rockies, holders of the worst record in baseball. Jameson Taillon struck out seven in 6.1 innings while allowing only one run on Memorial Day. Kyle Tucker drove in two and Dansby Swanson drove in a run on a groundout as the Cubs won 3–1.
- **May 27** – The Cubs took a 2–0 lead in the third, but the Rockies tied it in the seventh. The game remained tied after nine innings. In the 10th, neither team could score the Manfred runner. In the 11th, The Rockies took the lead on a groundout, but the Cubs rallied in the 11th as Michael Busch drove in the tying run. Matt Shaw got the game-winning single to score the 4–3 win. The win moved the Cubs to 34–21 with a three-game lead in the division.
- **May 28** – In the series finale against the Rockies, Matthew Boyd allowed only one run in six innings. Seiya Suzuki notched his baseball-leading 51st RBI in the first on a run-scoring double. Pete Crow-Armstrong hit his 15th home run of the season in the fourth to give him 50 RBI on the season as the Cubs won 2–1. The series sweep moved the Cubs to a season high 14 games over .500.
- **May 30** – After an off day, the Reds came to town for a three-game series. Michael Busch and Matt Shaw each recorded an RBI, but Colin Rea allowed six runs, including three home runs. For the first time on the season, the Cubs lost the opening game of series at Wrigley Field, losing 6–2.
- **May 31** – In game two against the Reds, the Cubs eased Ben Brown into the game to try alleviate recent struggles by having Drew Pomeranz open the game. Brown entered in the second and recorded nine strikeouts in six innings while allowing no runs. Seiya Suzuki doubled to score a run in the eighth and Dansby Swanson legged out an infield hit with the bases loaded later in the inning to give the Cubs 2–0 win.

==== June ====
- **June 1** – In the finale of the series against the Reds, Michael Busch had three hits, including a two-run homer while Nico Hoerner drove in two with a bases loaded double. Jameson Taillon pitched 6.1 innings while allowing only two runs as the Cubs won 7–3. The win moved the Cubs a season-high 15 games over .500 (37–22) and left them with a four-game lead in the division.
- **June 3** – After an off day, the Cubs traveled to Washington, D.C. to play the Nationals. Cade Horton allowed three runs in 5.1 innings of work as the Cubs trailed early 3–1. However, an RBI single by Michael Busch followed by sacrifice flies by Seiya Suzuki and Dansby Swanson, Swanson's second sacrifice fly of the game, gave the Cubs the 4–3 lead in the fourth. A bases loaded walk by Busch in the fifth followed by a Nico Hoerner bases loaded double pushed the Cub lead to 7–3. Three Cub relievers combined to shut out the Nationals for the remainder of the game and Busch added a solo home run as the Cubs won 8–3.
- **June 4** – In game two against the Nationals, Matthew Boyd pitched seven scoreless innings before allowing two runs in the eighth. The Cubs failed to score a run and lost 2–0.
- **June 5** – In the series finale against the Nationals, Pete Crow-Armstrong homered in the first to give the Cubs a 2–0 lead. Using an opener again, Colin Rea entered in the second and pitched 5.1 scoreless innings. Ian Happ also homered for the Cubs and drove in four runs as the Cubs won 7–1. The win moved the Cubs to 16 games over .500 at 39–23, the best record in the National League.
- **June 6** – A day later, the Cubs, holders of the second best record in baseball, visited the Detroit Tigers at Comerica Park to face the team with the best record. Ben Brown worked seven innings, striking out seven, but allowed two runs, including a home run in the bottom of the sixth. Kyle Tucker drove in the only Cub run in the game with a double in the sixth and the Tigers added another run in the eighth to win 3–1.
- **June 7** – In game two against the Tigers, the Cubs slammed five home runs to win 6–1. Seiya Suzuki hit two while Michael Busch, Pete Crow-Armstrong, and Matt Shaw also homered. Jameson Taillon allowed one run in seven innings in the win. The win moved the Cubs to 40–24 on the season with a four-game lead in the division.
- **June 8** – In the series finale against the Tigers, Cade Horton allowed four runs while the Cub offense was held scoreless. The Cubs managed only four hits in the game and lost 4–0. Craig Counsell was ejected from the game after Nico Hoerner was also ejected for arguing balls and strikes.
- **June 9** – The Cubs next travelled to Philadelphia to face the Phillies, losers of five in a row and nine of their last 10. Matthew Boyd allowed two runs, one unearned on error committed by Boyd, and allowed eight hits in six innings. Kyle Tucker homered in the first, but the Cubs trailed 2–1 in the eighth before Ian Happ homered to tie the game. In extra innings, neither team managed a run in the 10th before Pete Crow-Armstrong drove in the Manfred runner in the top of the 11th. Daniel Palencia, pitching his second inning of relief, allowed a single to the first batter to tie the game before back-to-back bunt singles loaded the bases. Craig Counsell was ejected for the second consecutive game for arguing whether the Phillies' runner was out of the baseline. Palencia allowed the game-winning single to the next batter despite the Cubs using five infielders as the Cubs lost 4–3.
- **June 10** – In game two against the Phillies, the Cubs slugged three home runs, one each by Dansby Swanson, Ian Happ, and Michael Busch, but trailed 4–3 after five innings. However, Happ hit his second homer of the game, a two-run shot, to give the Cubs the lead in the sixth. The Cubs extended the lead in the eighth on RBI hits by Reese McGuire, Kyle Tucker and Seiya Suzuki to secure the 8–4 win. The Cubs' division lead increased to five as they moved to 41–26 on the season.
- **June 11** – In the final game of the season against the Phillies, Ben Brown surrendered six runs in 5.2 innings as the Cubs lost 8–2. Pete Crow-Armstrong was out of the lineup for rest, marking the first game he had missed during the season.
- **June 12** – The Cubs returned to Wrigley to face the Pirates for a four-game series. In the first game, Jameson Taillon allowed only two runs in 6.1 innings of work. Pete Crow-Armstrong hit a two-run homer and Seiya Suzuki added a solo shot as the Cubs held on for the 3–2 win. The win moved the Cubs back to 15 games over .500 on the season.
- **June 13** – In game two, Cade Horton pitched 5.2 scoreless innings as he matched Paul Skenes's five scoreless innings for the Pirates. The Pirates took the lead in the eighth on a fielder's choice, but the Cubs quickly tied it in the bottom of the eighth also on a fielder's choice. In the 10th, the Pirates pushed across the Manfred runner for a 2–1 lead while the Cubs failed to score in the bottom half of the inning. The loss dropped the Cubs to 42–28 on the season.
- **June 14** – Ian Happ hit a sacrifice fly in the third and Dansby Swanson homered in the sixth to give the Cubs a 2–1 victory over the Pirates. Matthew Boyd only allowed one run in six innings in the win.
- **June 15** – In the finale against the Pirates, both teams scored two runs in the first, but didn't score again as the game went to extra innings. In the 10th, the Pirates failed to score. Ian Happ singled to right to drive in the winning run as the Cubs won three of four from the Pirates. All four games in the series were decided by one run. The win moved the Cubs to 44–28 on the season, 5.5 games ahead of Milwaukee in the division.
- **June 17** – After an off day, the Cubs began a three-game series with the second place Brewers at Wrigley. Ben Brown allowed a two-run home run in the first, but no other runs in five innings of work. Matt Shaw drove in a run in the second to narrow the lead to one. In the bottom of the fifth, Seiya Suzuki hit a three-run homer, his 18th on the season, to give the Cubs a 4–2 lead. The Brewers narrowed the lead to one in the sixth before Pete Crow-Armstrong hit a 452-foot home run of the video board in right field in the eighth inning to make the score 5–3. Daniel Palencia pitched the ninth to secure the win.
- **June 19** – After a rainout the day before, Jameson Taillon pitched four innings and allowed five runs while Génesis Cabrera allowed three runs in an inning of relief against the Brewers. Home runs by Pete Crow-Armstrong, his 20th on the season, and Dansby Swanson left the Cubs trailing 8–3 in the seventh. A two-run homer by Ian Happ in the seventh and a fielder's choice groundout and infield hit in the eighth drew the Cubs to within one at 8–7. However, despite a walk to leadoff the bottom of the ninth, the Cubs could not tie it and lost 8–7. The loss dropped the Cubs to 45–29 on the season.
- **June 20** – The Seattle Mariners arrived in Chicago for a three-game series. In game one, Matthew Boyd allowed only two runs in five innings. However, Ryan Pressly and Caleb Thielbar each allowed two run as the Cubs lost 9–4. Reese McGuire and Ian Happ homered for the Cubs in the loss.
- **June 21** – On an extremely windy day, Cade Horton allowed six runs, only three earned, in 4.2 innings. However, four Cub relievers allowed only one additional run. Ian Happ hit two home runs while Kyle Tucker and Peter Crow-Armstrong also homered for the Cubs. Happ had four RBI while Michael Busch drove in three as the Cubs beat the Mariners 10–6.
- **June 22** – In the finale against the Mariners, home runs for both teams continued as Colin Rea allowed seven runs in 5.1 innings. Reese McGuire and Kyle Tucker homered for the Cubs and Seiya Suzuki homered twice. However, Suzuki also committed two errors in right field at the Cubs were blown out 14–6. The win dropped the Cubs to 46–31 on the season with a 3.5 game division lead.
- **June 23** – The next day, the Cubs faced the St. Louis Cardinals at Busch Stadium. Ben Brown allowed four two-run homers, all to left-handed batters, as the Cubs were blown out 8–2. Carson Kelly and Justin Turner had RBI for the Cubs as they lost their fourth game in their previous five. Their division lead fell to 3.5 games as a result.
- **June 24** – In game two against the Cardinals, Jameson Taillon gave up eight runs in four innings of work while the Cub bullpen held the Cardinals scoreless. Kyle Tucker drove in two runs on a single before Seiya Suzuki hit a three run shot to give the Cubs the lead. The Cardinals rallied with six in the fourth inning to go ahead by three. Nico Hoerner hit his first home run of the season, a two-run shot in the sixth to draw the Cubs within one at 8–7. The Cubs could not push across another run and lost 8–7, their fifth loss in six games.
- **June 25** – Ian Happ hit a home run on the first pitch of the game and the Cubs led throughout, winning 8–0. Reese McGuire and Kyle Tucker also homered as the Cubs blew out the Cardinals. Matthew Boyd and three relievers combined for the shutout ending the Cubs three-game losing streak.
- **June 26** – In the finale of the four-game series against the Cardinals, Shota Imanaga pitched for the first time since May 4 as the Cubs again shutout the Cardinals. Michael Busch homered and Ian Happ drove in a run with a bases loaded walk in the 3–0 win. Imanaga pitched five scoreless innings while walking one and allowing only one hit The win moved the Cubs back to 15 games over .500 at 48–33. The Cubs lead in the division moved back to three games.
- **June 27** – The Cubs next traveled to Houston to play the Astros for a three-game series. In game one, Cade Horton allowed seven runs in four innings and left with the Cubs trailing 7–0. Nico Hoerner homered and Matt Shaw drove in three runs, but it was not enough as the Cubs lost 7–4.
- **June 28** – In game two against the Astros, the Cubs scored one run in the first on a bases loaded walk, but trailed 2–1 entering the fourth. In the fourth, Michael Busch and Nico Hoerner hit back-to-back solo home runs to give the Cubs the lead. Kyle Tucker hit a three-run homer while Ian Happ and Pete Crow Armstrong each drove in a run as the Cubs scored seven runs in the inning. Seiya Suzuki added a two-run home run in the eighth as the Cubs won easily 12–3.
- **June 29** – In the finale against the Astros, the Cubs were shut out 2–0 as Jameson Taillon allowed a two-run homer in the fifth. The loss dropped the Cubs to 49–35 on the season, two games ahead of the Brewers in the division.

==== July ====
- **July 1** – After a scheduled off day, the Cubs returned to Wrigley Field to face the Cleveland Guardians. Matthew Boyd pitched seven innings, allowing only two runs. Carson Kelly had two doubles and drove in three runs while Seiya Suzuki hit his 23rd home run of the season. Daniel Palencia pitched a perfect ninth to nail down the 5–2 win.
- **July 2** – In the second game against the Guardians, the Cubs fell behind 3–0 as Shota Imanaga surrendered three solo home runs in the first three innings. However, the Cubs retook the lead after scoring five runs in the third and fourth innings. Daniel Palencia allowed an unearned run in the ninth, but the Cubs held on for the 5–4 win. Seiya Suzuki drove in three runs in the win while Pet Crow-Armstrong also drove in two. The win moved the Cubs to 51–35 on the season. Prior to the game, it was announced the Crow-Armstrong and Kyle Tucker had been named starters for the All-Star Game.
- **July 3** – The series finale against the Guardians was scoreless through nine innings as Cade Horton pitched seven scoreless innings. The Cub bullpen also shut out the Guardians through nine. In the 10th, the Guardians were unable to score the Manfred runner and a sacrifice fly from Matt Shaw scored the winning run as the Cubs completed the sweep of the Guardians.
- **July 4** – The Cardinals next came to Wrigley Field for a three-game series. On the Fourth of July, the Cubs set a franchise record for most home runs in a game with eight as they blew out the Cardinals. Michael Busch hit three of the homers while Pete Crow-Armstrong homered twice. Carson Kelly, Seiya Suzuki, and Dansby Swanson also homered in the game. Collin Rea pitched 6.2 innings while allowing only one run on one hit. The win was the Cubs fourth straight, moving them to 53–35 on the season.
- **July 5** – In game two against the Cardinals, Michael Busch, Ian Happ, and Carson Kelly hit home runs to give the Cubs a 5–3 lead. However, Brad Keller allowed five runs in the eighth inning as the Cubs lost 8–6. The game was a bullpen game for the Cubs as the Cubs announced the projected starter for the game, Jameson Taillon, would miss significant time due to a calf injury,
- **July 6** – In the final game against St. Louis, newly announced All-Star Matthew Boyd pitched five scoreless innings. Seiya Suzuki homered and Kyle Tucker drove in three runs as the Cubs routed the Cardinals 11–0. The win moved the Cubs back to 18 games over .500 at 54–36 and kept their division lead at four games.
- **July 8** – After an off day, the Cubs travelled to face the Minnesota Twins at Target Field. Shota Imanaga allowed two runs in the first inning, but pitched five scoreless innings after that. However, the Cubs were held scoreless until Justin Turner hit his 200th career home run in the ninth. Porter Hodge allowed six runs while getting only one out in the eighth as the Cubs lost 8–1.
- **July 9** – In game two against the Twins, Cade Horton allowed four runs in 4.2 innings. The Cub offense struggled again, scoring only two runs, as they lost 4–2. The loss reduced their division lead over the Brewers to 1.5 games.
- **July 10** – In the finale against the Twins, Colin Rea pitched seven innings while allowing only one run. Pete Crow-Armstrong hit two homers, drove in three runs, and scored three runs as the Cubs beat the Twins easily 8–1. Michael Busch added two RBI as the Cub offense pounded out 14 hits. The Cubs moved to 55–38 on the season and ended their two-game losing streak.
- **July 11** – The Cubs next travelled to The Bronx to face the Yankees for the final series before the All-Star break. In game one, former Cub Cody Bellinger hit three home runs against his former team and another would-be home run robbed by Kyle Tucker. The Cub offense was blanked, failing to score a run as they were blown out 11–0.
- **July 12** – In the second game against the Yankees, Matthew Boyd pitched eight scoreless innings. Carson Kelly homered and drove in two as the Cubs held on for a 5–2 win.
- **July 13** – In the final game before the break, Shoto Imanaga allowed only one hit, a solo home run, as the Cubs beat the Yankees 4–1. Dansby Swanson hit a two-run homer while Michael Busch, batting leadoff for the first time, homered on the second pitch of the game. The win moved the Cubs to 18 games over .500 with a one-game lead over the Brewers in the division at the All-Star break.
- **July 18** – After the All-Star break, the Cubs began a three-game series against the Boston Red Sox, who had won 10 games in a row. In game one, Seiya Suzuki hit a three-run homer in the first and Nico Hoerner drove in a run in the sixth as the Cubs beat the Red Sox 4–1. Colin Rea allowed one run in five innings as the Cubs ended Boston's winning streak.
- **July 19** – In game two against the Red Sox, Shoto Imanaga pitched seven scoreless innings as the Cubs held the Red Sox scoreless in the game. The Cub offense smashed five home runs as Michael Busch and Kyle Tucker led off the bottom of the first with back-to-back homers. Matt Shaw hit a pinch-hit homer in the eighth and Pete Crow-Armstrong and Ian Happ went back-to-back in the eighth as the Cubs won 6–0. The win moved the Cubs to 59–49 on the season, 20 games over .500, and gave them the best record in baseball.
- **July 20** – In the finale against the Red Sox, Cade Horton pitched 5.2 scoreless innings and led with a 1–0 lead on an Ian Happ RBI single. However, the Cub bullpen blew the lead as Ryan Pressly allowed two runs, Drew Pomeranz allowed three and Ethan Roberts allowed one. The 6–1 loss dropped the Cubs into a tie in the division with the Brewers who won their 10th straight game.
- **July 21** – The Cubs next played the Kansas City Royals at Wrigley Field. Carson Kelly homered and Matt Shaw hit a three-run homer in the fourth to give the Cubs a short-lived lead. The Cubs used an opener before newly recalled Ben Brown entered the game in the second. Brown surrender seven runs, six earned in four innings. The Cub bullpen again struggled, allowing an additional five runs as the Cubs were blow out 12–4. The loss dropped the Cubs to 59–41 on the season as they fell one game behind the Brewers in the division.
- **July 22** – Matthew Boyd pitched seven scoreless innings while the Cub offense pushed across six runs without a home run. Carson Kelly, Nico Hoerner, Seiya Suzuki, Pete Crow-Armstrong, and Matt Shaw all had RBI in the 6–0 shutout of the Royals. The win combined with a Brewers loss put the Cubs into a tie atop the division.
- **July 23** – In the final game against the Royals, Colin Rea allowed six runs in five innings. Pete Crow-Armstrong and Matt Shaw homered for the Cubs, but it was not enough as they lost 8–4. The loss coupled with a Brewers win again dropped the Cubs to one game out of the division lead.
- **July 25** – After an off day, the Cubs faced their crosstown rival, the Chicago White Sox. Shota Imanaga allowed seven runs in three innings while the relief pitcher Chris Flexen surrendered four runs in two innings as the Cubs were blown out 12–5. Reese McGuire homered and drove in four runs in the loss.
- **July 26** – In game two, the game remained scoreless until the seventh when Ian Happ homered to give the Cubs a 1–0 lead. Matt Shaw followed with a two-run homer as the Cubs won easily 6–1. Cade Horton pitched 6.1 scoreless innings for the win. The win coupled with a Brewers loss put the Cubs back into a first-place tie in the division.
- **July 27** – In the finale of the season series against the White Sox, Pete Crow-Armstrong drove in two runs as the Cubs took a 5–1 into the eighth. A Sox three-run homer in the eighth cut the lead to one, but Daniel Palencia came in to earn a four-out save as the Cubs won 5–4. Ben Brown allowed only one run in five innings in the win. The win moved the Cubs 62–43 on the season, tied for the best record in the NL with the Brewers who remained tied for the division lead.
- **July 28** – With the division lead on the line, the Cubs traveled to face the Brewers for a three-game series. In game one, the Cubs scored three runs in the first on only two hits to take an early lead. However, Matthew Boyd struggled, allowing five runs on six hits and walking five in five innings. The Cub bullpen allowed three more runs as the Cubs lost 8–4.
- **July 29** – In game two against the Brewers, Collin Rea allowed four runs on eight hits in eight innings. Ryan Pressly allowed a grand slam in the sixth as the Cubs were blown out 9–3. The Cubs committed three errors in the game that led to two unearned runs. The loss dropped the Cubs two games behind the Brewers in the division.
- **July 30** – In the finale of the series against the Brewers, Shota Imanaga allowed three runs in five innings of work. Michael Busch and Ian Happ homered for the Cubs while newly recalled Moisés Ballesteros hit a bases loaded double to score three. Kyle Tucker also drove in two runs as the Cubs won easily 10–3. Pete Crow-Armstrong added three hits and scored two runs in the win that moved the Cubs to 63–45 on the season and back to within one game of the Brewers in the division.

==== August ====
- **August 1** – After an off day, the Cubs returned to Wrigley to face the Baltimore Orioles. Cade Horton allowed only two hits and no runs in five innings of work. The Cub bullpen, including newly acquired Andrew Kittredge, shut out the Orioles for the remainder of the game. Ian Happ drove in the only run of the game on a sacrifice fly in the second as the Cubs won 1–0.
- **August 2** – Matthew Boyd pitched seven scoreless innings and left with a 3–0 lead over the Orioles. However, the Cub bullpen surrendered four runs in the eighth as the Cubs lost 4–3. The loss dropped the Cubs two games behind the Brewers in the division.
- **August 3** – Colin Rea pitched 4.2 innings while allowing two runs against the Orioles in the series finale. Dansby Swanson gave the Cubs the lead in the sixth with an RBI single. However, in the top of the ninth, Daniel Palencia allowed the tying run to score with two outs. In the bottom of the ninth, Justin Turner hit a pinch-hit, two-run, walk-off home run to give the Cubs the 5–3 win. The Cubs moved to 65–46 on the season, the second best record in baseball, but were still two games behind division-leading Milwaukee.
- **August 4** – Newly acquired Michael Soroka got the start for the Cubs against the visiting Reds. Soroka allowed a solo home run in the first before leaving after two innings with discomfort in his right shoulder. Dansby Swanson hit a two-run homer in the third to give the Cubs a 2–1 lead. However, the Red tied it in the sixth and took the lead in the seventh. The Cubs could not muster another run as they lost 3–2. Combined with a Brewers' win, the Cubs dropped three games out of first.
- **August 5** – In the second game against the Reds, Shota Imanaga allowed only one run and left with the game tied at one in the seventh. Andrew Kittredge allowed four runs in in 1/3 of an inning as the Cubs lost 5–1. The loss dropped the Cubs four games behind the Brewers in the division.
- **August 6** – In the finale of the series against the Reds, Cade Horton pitched 5.2 scoreless innings while allowing only two hits and no walks. In the seventh, Andrew Kittredge struck out the side on nine pitches for an immaculate inning. Seiya Suzuki homered and drove in two runs while Ian Happ and Dansby Swanson also homered to give the Cubs the 6–1 win. The win moved the Cubs to 66–48 on the season.
- **August 8** – After an off day, the Cubs played the Cardinals in St. Louis. Matthew Boyd allowed three runs in five innings while the Cub offense could not score a run as they lost 5–0. The loss dropped the Cubs five games behind the Brewers.
- **August 9** – In game two against the Cardinals, Colin Rea allowed only one run in six innings. The Cub offense finally woke up, scoring nine runs at they won easily 9–1. Michael Busch homered and drove in three while Matt Shaw also homered and drove in two in the win. The win moved the Cubs to 67–49 on the season, remaining five games behind the Brewers.
- **August 10** – After the game was delayed an hour by torrential rain, Shota Imanaga allowed a two-run homer in the third to give the Cardinals an early lead. Matt Shaw homered for the second straight game in the fifth to tie the game at two. Imanaga allowed a run-scoring single in the seventh as the Cubs failed to score another run and lost 3–2. The loss dropped the Cubs six games behind the division-leading Brewers.
- **August 12** – After an off day, Javier Assad made his first start of the year against the Toronto Blue Jays after coming off the injured list. Assad allowed four runs in four innings as the Cub offense continued to struggle. Michael Busch drove in the only run for the Cubs as they lost 5–1. The loss pushed the Cubs 7.5 games out of the division lead, likely ending any real chance at winning the division. In the wild card race, the Cubs remained the first wild card seed with a 3.5 game lead over the last wild card spot.
- **August 13** – In game two against the Blue Jays, Cade Horton allowed only one run in 5.1 innings of work while striking out a career-high eight batters. Michael Busch and Matt Shaw each hit a solo home run to give the Cubs a 2–0 lead. Miguel Amaya, making his first start since returning from the injured list, was carted off the field after falling when he beat out an infield single. The Cubs notched two insurance runs in the eighth to give them the 4–1 win.
- **August 14** – In the finale of the series against the Blue Jays, Matthew Boyd and the Jays' Max Scherzer limited both offenses in a pitcher's duel. The Cubs took the lead in the sixth on a solo homer by Michael Busch. The Blue Jays took the lead in the bottom of the seventh on a two-run homer by Vladimir Guerrero Jr. The Cubs put runners on second and third with no outs in the top of the eighth, but Ian Happ, Kyle Tucker, and Carson Kelly struck out to end the threat. In the ninth, Nico Hoerner singled, but Willi Castro and Dansby Swanson struck out to end the game. The loss dropped the Cubs to 68–52 on the season.
- **August 15** – Returning to Wrigley to face the Pirates, Colin Rea allowed only one run in five innings. Pete Crow-Armstrong and Matt Shaw each drove in a run as the game was tied at two in the ninth. However, Daniel Palencia surrender a home run in the top of the ninth as the Cubs lost 3–2.
- **August 16** – In game two against the Pirates, Shota Imanaga allowed only one run in seven innings. The Cub offense continued to struggle as Imanaga left with the game tied at one. In the eighth, Seiya Suzuki and Nico Hoerner each drove in a run to give the Cubs a 3–1 lead. Brad Keller pitched a scoreless ninth to give the Cubs the win. The win moved the Cubs to 69–53 on the season.
- **August 17** – In the final game of the season against the Pirates, the Cubs took an early 1–0 lead on an Ian Happ single. Javier Assad allowed one run in four innings before Ben Brown allowed two runs in 2.2 innings. Carson Kelly tied the game at three in the sixth before Dansby Swanson drove in the go-ahead run with a sacrifice fly in the eighth. Andrew Kittredge pitched a perfect ninth to give the Cubs the 4–3 win. The Cubs moved to 70–53 on the season and back to within eight games of the Brewers in the division. They remained 4.5 games ahead of the final wild card spot.
- **August 18** – The Cubs next began a five-game series against the Brewers at Wrigley. In game one of a day-night doubleheader, Cade Horton allowed one run in 2.2 innings before leaving with a blister issue. The Brewers pushed their lead to 3–0 in the sixth before scoring four in the eighth to blow out the Cubs 7–0. The second game of the doubleheader was rained out and scheduled as a doubleheader for the next day.
- **August 19** – In game one of the doubleheader, rookie Owen Caissie homered and drove in three runs while Willi Castro hit his first homer as a Cub, a three-run shot in the third. Matthew Boyd allowed four runs in 5.1 innings, but the Cub bullpen shutout the Brewers as they held on for the 6–4 win. In the second game of the doubleheader, Jameson Taillon came off the injured list and pitched six innings while allowing only one run. Caissie drove in another run in the second to tie the game. Michael Busch gave the Cubs the lead in the second on a double and Nico Hoerner pushed the lead to two runs in the fifth with a single. Busch drove in another run in the sixth on a fielder's choice following a Matt Shaw triple and the Cub bullpen again held the Brewers scoreless. The 4–1 win gave the Cubs the sweep of the doubleheader and brought them within seven games of the Brewers in the division. Kyle Tucker, who had been struggling since the All-Star break, sat out both games of the doubleheader.
- **August 20** – In game four against the Brewers, Colin Rea allowed one run in the second before Michael Busch hit a double with the bases loaded to give the Cubs a 3–1 lead. Matt Shaw homered in the eighth to give the Cubs a 4–2 lead entering the ninth. Daniel Palencia allowed one run, but got a lineout with the bases loaded to hold on for the save. The win moved the Cubs to 73–54 on the season, six games behind Milwaukee in the division and remained 5.5 games ahead of the final wild card spot.
- **August 21** – In the final game of the season against the Brewers, Shota Imanaga allowed a two-run home run in the top of the second. That was enough for the Brewers to win as the Cubs only managed one run, losing 4–1.
- **August 22** – The Cubs next travelled to face the Los Angeles Angels in Anaheim. Kyle Tucker hit his first homer in more than a month to give the Cubs a 1–0 lead. Seiya Suzuki added a sacrifice fly in the third to give the Cubs a 2–0 lead. Javier Assad pitched well, allowing only one run in six innings. Andrew Kittredge allowed a run in the seventh and the game entered the ninth tied. Pete Crow-Armstrong hit a solo homer in the ninth and Daniel Palencia pitched a perfect bottom half of the inning to give the Cubs the 3–2 win.
- **August 23** – In game two against the Angels, Kyle Tucker homered twice and drove in five runs. Reese McGuire hit a grand slam in the fourth and drove in another run in the seventh to notch five RBI as well. Cade Horton pitched six scoreless innings as the Cubs blew out the Angels 12–1.
- **August 24** – In the final game of the series, Jameson Taillon allowed only one run in five innings and left with a 4–1 lead. Four Cubs each drove in a run including Kyle Tucker who continued to hit the ball well. With the lead 4–3 in the ninth, Daniel Palencia gave up a single and a walk, but struck out the side as the Cubs won. The win moved the Cubs to a season-high 21 games over .500 on the season. They moved to five games behind the Brewers and nine games up in the wild car race.
- **August 26** – After an off day, the Cubs faced the Giants in San Francisco. Matthew Boyd allowed five runs in 5.1 innings and the Cub offense managed only two runs and lost 5–2.
- **August 27** – In game two, the Cubs took a lead in the second on a three-run homer by Nico Hoerner. However, Colin Rea allowed seven runs in 4.2 innings and the Cub bullpen, including catcher Reese McGuire, surrendered five more runs as the Cubs were blown out 12–3.
- **August 28** – In the finale of the series against the Giants, Shota Imanaga allowed two home runs and three runs in seven innings of work. Dansby Swanson and Michael Busch homered for the Cubs, but the game remained tied in the ninth before Daniel Palencia allowed three hits to drive in the winning run for the Giants as the Cubs lost 4–3. The Cubs fell to 76–58 on the season, 6.5 game behind the Brewers and four games up on the final wild card spot.
- **August 29** – The Cubs traveled to Denver to face the Rockies for a three-game series. Dansby Swanson hit two homers and drove in six runs as the Cubs took a 9–2 lead. Cade Horton allowed two runs in five innings, but the Cub bullpen allowed five runs to narrow the lead. It was not enough at the Cubs held on for an 11–7 win. Michael Busch and Ian Happ also homered for the Cubs in the win.
- **August 30** – In game two against the Rockies, Javier Assad allowed three runs in six innings and the Cub bullpen blanked the Rockies. RBI by Carson Kelly, Michael Tucker, Ian Happ, and Nico Hoerner were enough as the Cubs won 4–3. The win moved the Cubs to 78–58 on the season, 10 games ahead of the Reds in the wildcard race.
- **August 31** – In the finale of the series against the Rockies, Matthew Boyd allowed four runs in six innings. Porter Hodge allowed a run in the seventh as the Cubs fell behind 5–2. Ian Happ hit a three-run homer in the eighth to tie it, but Daniel Palencia surrendered the winning run in the ninth as the Cubs lost 6–5.

==== September ====
- **September 1** – The Cubs returned home to face the Atlanta Braves on Labor Day. Colin Rea allowed three runs in four innings and Taylor Rogers allowed three more in the fifth as the Cubs fell behind 6–1. However, newly acquired pitcher Aaron Civale pitched three scoreless innings of relief. Matt Shaw drove in a run in the fifth and Dansby Swanson drove in two in the sixth to narrow the lead to 6–4. In eighth, Carson Kelly hit a game-tying two-run homer. The game went to extra innings and Kelly drove in the winning run in the bottom of the 10th to give the Cubs the 7–6 win. The win moved the Cubs to 79–59 on the season.
- **September 2** – In game two against the Braves, Kyle Tucker hit a three-run homer in the third to give the Cubs a 3–0 lead. Ian Happ drove in a run later in the inning to move the lead to four. Shota Imanaga allowed two home runs as the Braves narrowed the score to 4–3. However, the Cub bullpen shut out the Braves to secure the win.
- **September 3** – In the finale of the series against the Braves, Cade Horton pitched five scoreless innings. However, the Cub bullpen surrendered five runs as the Cubs lost 5–1.
- **September 5** – After an off day, the Cubs faced the Nationals for a three-game series. Dansby Swanson and Reese McGquire homered early for the Cubs as they took a 6–0 lead after two. Jaiver Assad allowed four runs in 5.1 innings, but the Cub bullpen surrendered only one more run. Nico Hoerner and Ian Happ also homered as the Cubs won 11–5.
- **September 6** – Matthew Boyd allowed only two runs in seven innings of work, but the Cub offense only managed one run as they lost 2–1.
- **September 7** – In the final game of the season against the Nationals, Carson Kelly homered twice as the Cubs took a 3–1 lead into the ninth. Daniel Palencia allowed a three-run homer, part of five runs allowed by Palencia without getting an out, to blow the save. The 6–3 loss dropped the Cubs to 81–62 on the season.
- **September 8** – The Cubs travelled to Atlanta to face the Braves. Shota Imanaga allowed three runs in six innings and the Cub offense mustered only one run as they lost 4–1. The loss left the Cubs 7.5 games behind the Brewers in the division and eight games up on the final wild card spot.
- **September 9** – Cade Horton allowed only one run in 6.1 innings while three relievers shutout the Braves. Pete Crow-Armstrong drove in two early runs to give the Cubs a 2–1 lead. Dansby Swanson drove in a run with a bases-loaded walk in the eighth and Matt Shaw broke the game open with a bases-clearing single. The 6–1 win moved the Cubs to 82–63 on the season, guaranteeing their third straight winning season.
- **September 10** – In the final game against the Braves, Carson Kelly homered while Justin Turner and Seiya Suzuki also drove in runs. Jameson Taillon allowed two runs in 4.1 innings, but the Cub bullpen shut out the Braves for the remainder of the game as the Cubs won 3–2.
- **September 12** – Returning to Wrigley after an off day, the Cubs faced the Tampa Bay Rays. Matthew Boyd allowed four runs in five innings, but the Cub offense pushed across six runs for the 6–4 win. Ian Happ homered and drove in two runs while four other Cubs drove in a run. The win moved the Cubs to 84–63 on the season.
- **September 13** – On a day dedicated to the retirement of former Cub star Anthony Rizzo, Colin Rea allowed three runs on seven hits in 5.1 innings and left the game tied at three. Michael Busch gave the Cubs the lead in the seventh with a homer, but the Cub bullpen allowed a solo homer in the eighth and the ninth to the Rays as the Cubs lost 5–4.
- **September 14** – In the finale of the series against the Rays, Shota Imanaga allowed two home runs in the first, but held the Rays scoreless over the next four innings. Three Cub relievers also shut out the Rays while Nico Hoerner drove in three runs and Ian Happ homered to give the Cubs the 4–3 win.
- **September 15** – The Cubs travelled to Pittsburgh for a three-game series. In game one, Jameson Taillon pitched six scoreless innings while the Cub bullpen also shut out the Pirates. Pete Crow-Armstrong and Michael Busch homered for the Cubs in the 4–0 win. The win moved the Cubs magic number to clinching a playoff spot to three as they moved nine games ahead of the last wild card spot. The win also moved the Cubs to 22 games over .500 for the first time at 86–64 on the season.
- **September 16** – In game two against the Pirates, Cade Horton out-dueled Cy Young Award favorite Paul Skenes, allowing only one run in five innings. Four relievers combined to shut out the Pirates for the remainder of the game. Michael Busch homered while Pete Crow-Armstrong drove in two runs in the 4–1 win. The win moved the Cubs to a season-high 23 games over .500 and reduced their magic number to make the playoffs to one.
- **September 17** – In the final game of the season against the Pirates, the Cubs took an early 4–0 lead on a two-run homer by Ian Happ and a solo shot by Moisés Ballesteros. However, Matthew Boyd allowed four runs in three innings to allow the Pirates to tie the game. However, Aaron Civale and three relievers shut out the Pirates for the final six innings. Meanwhile, Justin Turner drove in two runs while Ian Happ drove in another as the Cubs pulled away for an 8–4 win. The win moved the Cubs to 24 games over .500 and clinched the team's first playoff berth since the COVID-shortened season of 2020.
- **September 18** – The Cubs travelled to Cincinnati to face the Reds in a four-game series. In the first game, Colin Rea allowed only one run in seven innings, but the Cubs were shut out 1–0.
- **September 19** – In game two, Shota Imanaga allowed four runs in five innings while Porter Hodge allowed three runs in one inning of relief. Dansby Swanson and Matt Shaw homered for the Cubs, but it was not enough as the Reds won 7–4.
- **September 20** – Javier Assad allowed two runs in four innings and the Cub bullpen allowed four more as the Cubs lost to the Reds 6–3. Michael Busch and Reese McGuire homered for the Cubs in the loss.
- **September 21** – In the season finale against the Reds, Jameson Taillon gave up only one run in seven innings. However, the Cubs failed to score again and were shut out 1–0. The loss was the Cubs fourth straight since clinching a playoff spot. The Cubs remained eight games ahead of the final wild card spot and three games ahead of the second wild card spot with one week left in the regular season.
- **September 23** – After an off day, the Cubs returned home to face the Mets. The Cubs jumped to an early 6–1 lead after four innings. However, Cade Horton was forced to leave the game after only three innings with back tightness. The Cub bullpen imploded, quickly allowing the Mets to tie the game at six and then take a 7–6 lead in sixth inning. Seiya Suzuki drove in a run in the bottom of the sixth to tie the game, but Caleb Thielbar allowed a two-run homer in the eighth as the Cubs lost their fifth straight game since clinching a playoff spot.
- **September 24** – In game two against the Mets, the Cubs again took an early lead, scoring five in the third and one in the fourth. The Mets narrowed the lead to 6–2 in the top of the fifth, but the Cubs scored four more runs in the next two innings and held on for a 10–3 win. Michael Busch and Matt Shaw each homered while Ian Happ drove in two runs in the win. The win moved the Cubs 2.5 games ahead of the Padres in the race for the top wild card spot.
- **September 25** – In the finale against the Mets, Shota Imanaga allowed eight runs in 5.2 innings and left with the Cubs trailing 8–2. Seiya Suzuki hit two homers and drove in four runs while Dansby Swanson also homered, but it was not enough as the Cubs lost their sixth game in their previous seven. Prior to the game, the Dodgers clinched the NL West guaranteeing the Cubs would face the Padres in the first round of the playoffs.
- **September 26** – In the first game of the final series of the regular season, the Cubs blew out the Cardinals 12–1. Pete Crow-Armstrong homered for the Cubs, marking his 30th of the season and making him the second Cub ever to join the 30-30 club. Seiya Suzuki hit a grand slam and drove in five runs while Nico Hoerner also homered. The win moved the Cubs magic number for clinching home field advantage in the wild card series to one.
- **September 27** – The next day, Michael Busch homered twice while Seiya Suzuki homered for the fourth time in five games. Pete Crow-Armstrong also homered as the Cubs beat the Cardinals 7–3. The win meant the Cubs would host the wild card series against the Padres. Prior to the game, the Cubs announced that likely starter for the wild card series, Cade Horton, was placed on the 15-day IL, meaning he would not pitch in the wild card series.
- **September 28** – In the regular season finale, Seiya Suzuki homered again and three Cub pitchers shut out the Cardinals to complete the three-game sweep. The win moved the Cubs' record to 92–70.

=== Transactions ===
==== March ====
March 17	Selected the contract of Matt Shaw. Designated RHP Keegan Thompson for assignment. Optioned RHP Daniel Palencia to Iowa. Placed RHP Javier Assad on 15-day injured list.
March 21	Optioned LHP Jordan Wicks to Iowa.
March 25	Placed RHP Tyson Miller on 15-day IL retroactive to March 21. Sent RHP Keegan Thompson outright to Iowa.
March 26	Placed IF Vidal Bruján on 10-day IL retroactive to March 23. Placed RHP Ryan Brasier on 15-day IL retroactive to March 25.
March 27	Selected the contract of RHP Brad Keller. Designated RHP Cody Poteet for assignment.
March 29	Traded RHP Cody Poteet to Baltimore Orioles for cash.

==== April ====
April 8	Signed free agent LHP Evan Taylor to a minor league contract.
April 9	Placed LHP Justin Steele on 15-day IL. Recalled RHP Ethan Roberts from Iowa.
April 10	Traded cash to San Diego Padres for LHP Tom Cosgrove. Designated RHP Caleb Kilian for assignment.
April 12	Released RHP Caleb Kilian.
April 15	Activated IF Vidal Bruján from 10-day IL. Recalled LHP Luke Little and RHP Daniel Palencia from Iowa. Optioned IF Matt Shaw and RHP Nate Pearson to Iowa. Placed RHP Eli Morgan on 15-day IL.
April 16	Signed RHP Caleb Kilian to a minor league contract.
April 18	Recalled LHP Jordan Wicks from Iowa. Optioned LHP Luke Little to Iowa.
April 21	Optioned LHP Jordan Wicks to Iowa. Traded cash to Seattle Mariners for LHP Drew Pomeranz.
April 22	Recalled RHP Gavin Hollowell from Iowa. Signed free RHP Michael Fulmer to a minor league contract.
April 23	Optioned RHP Gavin Hollowell to Iowa. Selected the contract of Drew Pomeranz from Iowa. Signed free agent IF Nicky Lopez. Designated IF Gage Workman for assignment. Transferred LHP Justin Steel to 60-day IL.
April 26	Traded IF Gage Workman to the Chicago White Sox for cash.
April 27	Recalled LHP Tom Cosgrove from Iowa. Optioned RHP Ethan Roberts to Iowa.
April 29	Signed free agent LHP Sebastian Lopez to a minor league contract.
April 30	Selected the contract of RHP Chris Flexen from Iowa. Optioned LHP Tom Cosgrove to Iowa. Placed RHP Javier Assad on 60-day IL.

==== May ====
May 5	Placed LHP Shota Imanaga on 15-day IL. Recalled RHP Gavin Hollowell from Iowa.
May 8	Signed free agent RHP Dawson Netz to a minor league contract.
May 9	Placed LHP Caleb Thielbar on paternity list. Recalled LHP Tom Cosgrove from Iowa. Signed free agent RHP Tommy Romero to a minor league contract.
May 10	Optioned LHP Tom Cosgrove to Iowa. Selected the contract of RHP Cade Horton from Iowa. Transferred RHP Eli Morgan to 60-day IL.
May 12	Activated LHP Caleb Thielbar from paternity list. Optioned RHP Gavin Hollowell to Iowa.
May 13	Placed OF Ian Happ on 10-day IL retroactive to May 10. Transferred RHP Tyson Miller to 60-day IL. Selected the contract of C Moisés Ballesteros from Iowa.
May 16	Signed free agent RHP Kenta Maeda to a minor league contract.
May 19	Designated IF Nicky Lopez for assignment. Recalled IF Matt Shaw from Iowa.
May 20	Activated OF Ian Happ from 10-day IL. Placed RHP Porter Hodge on 15-day IL retroactive to May 18. Recalled RHP Ethan Roberts from Iowa. Optioned C Moisés Ballesteros to Iowa.
May 21	Sent IF Nicky Lopez outright to Iowa.
May 22	Signed free agent C Reese McGuire to a minor league contract.
May 23	Optioned RHP Ethan Roberts to Iowa. Signed free agent RHP Fleury Soriano to a minor league contract. Activated RHP Ryan Brasier from 15-day IL.
May 24	Selected the contract of RHP Brooks Kriske from Iowa. Designated RHP Julian Merryweather for assignment.
May 25	Placed C Miguel Amaya on 10-day IL. Selected the contract of Reese McGuire from Iowa.
May 29	Signed free agent LHP Génesis Cabrera. Designated RHP Brooks Kriske for assignment.
May 30	Released RHP Julian Merryweather.

==== June ====
June 2	Signed free agent RHP Ben Heller to a minor league contract.
June 5	Activated RHP Tyson Miller from 60-day L. Designated RHP Tyson Miller for assignment. Signed free agent RHP Jake Woodford to a minor league contract. Sent RHP Brooks Kriske outright to Iowa.
June 10	Signed free agent OF Greg Allen and C Sammy Sass to minor league contracts.
June 11	Sent RHP Tyson Miller outright to Iowa.
June 12	Signed free agent RHPs Usef Hanania and Anderson Rivera to minor league contracts.
June 19	Signed free agent C Miguel Useche to a minor league contract.
June 21	Designated LHP Génesis Cabrera for assignment. Recalled RHP Nate Pearson from Iowa.
June 23	Sent LHP Génesis Cabrera outright to Iowa. Selected the contract of RHP Michael Fulmer from Iowa. Optioned RHP Nate Pearson to Iowa.
June 24	Activated RHP Porter Hodge from 15-day IL. Optioned RHP Ben Brown to Iowa.
June 26	Activated Shota Imanaga from 15-day IL. Designated RHP Michael Fulmer for assignment.
June 29	Sent RHP Michael Fulmer outright to Iowa.

==== July ====
July 3	Signed free agent RHP Ryan Jensen to a minor league contract.
July 4	Placed RHP Jameson Taillon on 15-day IL. Recalled LHP Jordan Wicks from Iowa.
July 9	Placed RHP Porter Hodge on the 15-day IL. Recalled RHP Ethan Roberts from Iowa.
July 12	Optioned LHP Jordan Wicks to Iowa. Selected the contract of Brooks Kriske from Iowa. Signed free agent RHP Spencer Turnbull to a minor league contract.
July 21	Recalled RHP Ben Brown from Iowa. Optioned RHP Ethan Roberts to Iowa. Signed OF Kade Snell, LHP Colton Book, OF Kane Kepley, RHP Dominick Reid, RHP Eli Jerzembeck, C Justin Stransky, OF Ethan Conrad, RHP Noah Edders, LHP Pierce Coppola, and RHP Jake Knapp.
July 22	Signed free agent RHP Zach Pop to minor league contract.
July 24	Signed RHP Kaemyn Franklin, RHP Freddy Rodriguez, OF Josiah Hartshorn, RHP Connor Spencer, C Logan Poteet, RHP Nate Williams, RHP Connor Knox, and RHP Kaleb Wing.
July 25	Signed free agent IF Jose Silva and RHP Braylon Myers to minor league contracts. Signed RHP Riely Hunsaker.
July 29	Designated RHP Chris Flexen for assignment. Recalled RHP Gavin Hollowell from Iowa.
July 30	Recalled C Moisés Ballesteros from Iowa. Designated IF Vidal Bruján for assignment. Activated RHP Porter Hodge from IL and optioned to Iowa.
July 31	Traded SS Wilfri De La Cruz to Baltimore Orioles for RHP Andrew Kittredge. Traded SS Ronny Cruz and OF Christian Franklin to Washington Nationals for RHP Michael Soroka. Traded RHP Ryan Gallagher to Minnesota Twins for OF Willi Castro. Traded OF Ivan Brethowr to Pittsburgh Pirates for LHP Taylor Rogers. Designated RHP Ryan Pressly for assignment. Placed C Miguel Amaya on 60-day IL.

==== August ====
August 1	Activated OF Willi Castro, LHP Taylor Rogers, and RHP Andrew Kittredge. Optioned C Moisés Ballesteros and RHP Gavin Hollowell to Iowa.
August 2	Activated RHP Michael Soroka. Designated RHP Brooks Kriske for assignment.
August 3	Released RHP Chris Flexen.
August 5	Placed RHP Michael Soroka on 15-day IL. Recalled RHP Nate Pearson from Iowa.
August 7	Signed free agent OF Forrest Wall to a minor league contract.
August 11	Optioned RHP Nate Pearson to Iowa.
August 12	Activated C Miguel Amaya and RHP Javier Assad from 60-day IL. Designated IF Jon Berti for assignment.
August 13	Released IF Jon Berti.
August 14	Placed C Miguel Amaya on 10-day IL. Recalled OF Owen Caissie from Iowa.
August 18	Optioned RHP Javier Assad to Iowa. Recalled RHP Gavin Hollowell and LHP Luke Little from Iowa.
August 19	Optioned RHP Gavin Hollowell and LHP Luke Little to Iowa. Recalled LHP Tom Cosgrove from Iowa. Activated Jameson Taillon from 15-day IL.
August 22	Recalled RHP Javier Assad from Iowa. Placed RHP Ryan Brasier on 15-day IL.
August 23	Optioned RHP Javier Assad to Iowa. Recalled LHP Jordan Wicks from Iowa.
August 28	Placed RHP Jameson Taillon on 15-day IL retroactive to August 25. Recalled RHP Javier Assad from Iowa.
August 31	Claimed RHP Aaron Civale off waivers from Chicago White Sox. Recalled RHP Porter Hodge from Iowa. Optioned LHP Jordan Wicks to Iowa. Designated LHP Tom Cosgrove for assignment.

==== September ====
September 1	Signed free agent 1B Carlos Santana. Activated RHP Aaron Civale from 15-day IL. Recalled OF Kevin Alcántara from Iowa. Optioned OF Owen Cassie to Iowa. Designated IF Ben Cowles for assignment. Signed free agent RHP Joe Ross to a minor league contract.
September 3	Sent LHP Tom Cosgrove outright to Iowa.
September 8	Placed RHP Daniel Palencia on 15-day IL. Recalled RHP Ethan Roberts from Iowa.
September 9	Place OF Kyle Tucker on 10-day IL retroactive to September 6. Recalled C Moisés Ballesteros from Iowa.
September 10	Activated RHP Jameson Taillon from 15-day IL. Optioned RHP Ethan Roberts to Iowa.
September 13	Recalled OF Owen Caissie from Iowa. Optioned OF Kevin Alcántara to Iowa.
September 13	Placed OF Owen Cassie on 7-day concussion IL.
September 14	Recalled OF Kevin Alcántara from Iowa.
September 15	Activated RHP Michael Soroka from 15-day IL. Optioned RHP Ben Brown to Iowa.
September 20	Optioned RHP Porter Hodge to Iowa. Recalled LHP Jordan Wicks from Iowa. Activated RHP Eli Morgan from 60-day IL. Designated RHP Nate Pearson for assignment.
September 21	Released RHP Nate Pearson.
September 24	Activated RHP Daniel Palencia from 15-day IL. Optioned LHP Jordan Wicks to ACL Cubs.
September 26	Activated OF Kyle Tucker from 10-day IL. Optioned 1B Carlos Santana to ACL Cubs.
September 27	Placed RHP Cade Horton on 15-day IL retroactive to September 25. Recalled LHP Jordan Wicks from ACL Cubs.

== Roster ==
2025 Chicago Cubs
Roster
Pitchers: 72 Javier Assad; 16 Matthew Boyd; 54 Ryan Brasier; 32 Ben Brown; 92 Génesis Cabrera; 38 Aaron Civale; 38 Tom Cosgrove; 58,77 Chris Flexen; 49 Michael Fulmer; 37 Porter Hodge; 46 Gavin Hollowell; 22 Cade Horton; 18 Shota Imanaga; 40 Brad Keller; 59 Andrew Kittredge; 57 Brooks Kriske; 43 Luke Little; 66 Julian Merryweather; 33 Eli Morgan; 48 Daniel Palencia; 56 Nate Pearson; 45 Drew Pomeranz; 55 Ryan Pressly; 53 Colin Rea; 39 Ethan Roberts; 17 Taylor Rogers; 41,99 Michael Soroka; 35 Justin Steele; 50 Jameson Taillon; 24 Caleb Thielbar; 36 Jordan Wicks	Catchers: 9 Miguel Amaya; 15 Carson Kelly; 20 Reese McGuire; Infielders: 25 Moisés Ballesteros; 5 Jon Berti; 17 Vidal Bruján; 29 Michael Busch; 2 Nico Hoerner; 12 Nicky Lopez; 41 Carlos Santana; 6 Matt Shaw; 7 Dansby Swanson; 3 Justin Turner; 25 Gage Workman	Outfielders: 13 Kevin Alcántara; 19 Owen Caissie; 1 Willi Castro; 4 Pete Crow-Armstrong; 8 Ian Happ; 27 Seiya Suzuki; 30 Kyle Tucker	Manager: 30 Craig Counsell; Coaches: 0 Quintin Berry (third base); 63 Juan Cabreja (assistant hitting); 93 Erick Castillo (bullpen catcher); 84 Ryan Flaherty (bench); 68 Tommy Hottovy (pitching); 86 Casey Jacobson (assistant pitching); 65 Jose Javier (first base); 76 Dustin Kelly (hitting); 74 AJ Lewis (staff assistant); 85 Garrett Lloyd (bullpen catcher); 80 John Mallee (assistant hitting); 90 Jonathan Mota (major league coach); 97 Alex Smith (major league strategy); 81 Mark Strittmatter (bullpen)

== Postseason ==
=== Game log ===
2025 Postseason Game Log: 4–4 (Home: 4–1; Away: 0–3)
2025 National League Wild Card Series: 2–1 (Home: 2–1; Away: 0–0)

#	Date	Opponent	Score	Win	Loss	Save	Attendance	Record
1	September 30	Padres	3–1	**Palencia** (1–0)	Pivetta (0–1)	**Keller** (1)	39,114	1–0
2	October 1	Padres	0–3	Morejón (1–0)	**Kittredge** (0–1)	Suárez (1)	41,083	1–1
3	October 2	Padres	3–1	**Palencia** (2–0)	Darvish (0–1)	**Kittredge** (1)	40,895	2–1

2025 National League Division Series: 2–3 (Home: 2–0; Away: 0–3)

#	Date	Opponent	Score	Win	Loss	Save	Attendance	Record
1	October 4	@ Brewers	3–9	Peralta (1–0)	**Boyd** (0–1)	—	42,678	0–1
2	October 6	@ Brewers	3–7	Misiorowski (1–0)	**Imanaga** (0–1)	—	42,787	0–2
3	October 8	Brewers	4–3	**Pomeranz** (1–0)	Priester (0–1)	**Keller** (2)	40,737	1–2
4	October 9	Brewers	6–0	**Palencia** (3–0)	Peralta (1–1)	—	41,770	2–2
5	October 11	@ Brewers	1–3	Misiorowski (2–0)	**Rea** (0–1)	Uribe (1)	42,743	2–3

Legend: = Win = Loss = Postponement
Bold = Cubs team member

=== Wild Card series ===
==== Game 1 ====
September 30, 2025 2:08 pm (CDT) at Wrigley Field in Chicago, Illinois
Team	1	2	3	4	5	6	7	8	9	R	H	E
San Diego	0	1	0	0	0	0	0	0	0	**1**	**4**	**0**
**Chicago**	0	0	0	0	2	0	0	1	X	**3**	**6**	**1**
WP: Daniel Palencia (1–0) LP: Nick Pivetta (0–1) Sv: Brad Keller (1); Home runs: SD: None; CHI: Seiya Suzuki (1), Carson Kelly (1); Attendance: 39,114; Boxscore

The Padres announced that Nick Pivetta would be their starter for game one while Matthew Boyd was named the starter for the Cubs. Boyd allowed one run in the second on back-to-back doubles by the Padres. However, a diving stop by Dansby Swanson with a runner on third and no one out in the inning kept the lead at 1–0. The Cubs got out of the inning without any further runs. Boyd walked a batter in the fourth and gave up a single, but was able to get out of the inning without allowing another run. With one out in the fifth, he allowed another single before being lifted from the game, but Daniel Palencia was able to get the final two outs of the inning. Seiya Suzuki kept up his hot hitting, homering in the fifth to tie the game at one. The homer was his sixth in the previous five games. Carson Kelly followed with a home run to give the Cubs a 2–1 lead in the sixth. Nico Hoerner added a sacrifice fly in the eighth to extend the lead to 3–1. Four Cub relivers combined to pitch 4.1 innings of perfect relief, retiring all 15 batters they faced to seal the 3–1 win. The win marked the Cubs first postseason win since 2017 and gave the Cubs a 1–0 lead in the best-of-three series.

==== Game 2 ====
October 1, 2025 2:08 pm (CDT) at Wrigley Field in Chicago, Illinois
Team	1	2	3	4	5	6	7	8	9	R	H	E
**San Diego**	1	0	0	0	2	0	0	0	0	**3**	**7**	**0**
Chicago	0	0	0	0	0	0	0	0	0	**0**	**4**	**0**
WP: Adrián Morejón (1–0) LP: Andrew Kittredge (0–1) Sv: Robert Suárez (1); Home runs: SD: Manny Machado (1); CHI: None; Attendance: 41,083; Boxscore

The Cubs chose to start Andrew Kittredge as an opener in game two while Dylan Cease got the start for the Padres. Kittredge allowed a run in the first before being relieved by Shota Imanaga in the second. Imanaga held the Padres scoreless until the fifth when he allowed a two-run homer by Manny Machado. With the Cubs trailing by three, the offense only manages four hits as they were shutout 3–0. The loss forced the series to go to a decisive game three.

==== Game 3 ====
October 2, 2025 4:08 pm (CDT) at Wrigley Field in Chicago, Illinois
Team	1	2	3	4	5	6	7	8	9	R	H	E
San Diego	0	0	0	0	0	0	0	0	1	**1**	**7**	**0**
**Chicago**	0	2	0	0	0	0	1	0	X	**3**	**13**	**0**
WP: Daniel Palencia (2–0) LP: Yu Darvish (0–1) Sv: Andrew Kittredge (1); Home runs: SD: Jackson Merrill (1); CHI: Michael Busch (1); Attendance: 40,895; Boxscore

In the deciding game of the series, former Cub Yu Darvish got the start for the Padres while Jameson Taillon got the start for the Cubs. The Cubs got to Darvish early, loading the bases in the second after a Kyle Tucker single, a Seiya Suzuki double, and a hit by pitch. Pete Crow-Armstrong followed with a single to give the Cubs a 1–0 lead. The Padres pulled Darvish for former Cub Jeremiah Estrada. Estrada walked Dansby Swanson to force in a run before striking out Matt Shaw and forcing Michael Busch to hit in to a double play to end the inning. Taillon went four innings, allowing only two hits and walking none. Dansby Swanson and Nico Hoerner made some dazzling plays to help the bullpen keep the Padres scoreless until the ninth. Busch added a home run in the seventh to push the lead to three. In the ninth, Brad Keller allowed a leadoff home run before hitting two batters to put the tying run on first. Andrew Kittredge relieved to get a grounder for the second out, but pushed the tying run at second. However, on the first pitch of the next at-bat, Padres catcher Freddy Fermín hit a fly ball to center which Crow-Armstrong caught to end the series.

==== Composite line score ====
2025 NLWC (2–1): Chicago Cubs beat San Diego Padres

Team	1	2	3	4	5	6	7	8	9	R	H	E
San Diego Padres	1	1	0	0	2	0	0	0	1	**5**	**18**	**0**
**Chicago Cubs**	0	2	0	2	0	0	1	1	0	**6**	**23**	**1**
Total attendance: 121,092 Average attendance: 40,364

=== Division series ===
==== Game 1 ====
October 4, 2025 1:08 pm (CDT) at American Family Field in Milwaukee, Wisconsin
Team	1	2	3	4	5	6	7	8	9	R	H	E
Chicago	1	0	0	0	0	1	0	1	0	**3**	**5**	**1**
**Milwaukee**	6	3	0	0	0	0	0	0	X	**9**	**13**	**0**
WP: Freddy Peralta (1–0) LP: Matthew Boyd (0–1); Home runs: CHI: Michael Busch (1), Ian Happ (1), Nico Hoerner (1); MIL: None; Attendance: 42,678; Boxscore

Matthew Boyd got the start for the Cubs while Freddy Peralta started for the Brewers in game one. Michael Busch hit a leadoff home run to start the game and give the Cubs a 1–0 lead. However, Boyd failed to get out of the first, allowing six runs, two earned, while only getting two outs. Trailing 6–1 after the first, Michael Soroka allowed three more runs in the second as the Brewers took an eight-run lead. Ian Happ and Nico Hoerner homered later in the game, but it was not enough as the Cubs were blown out 9–3.

==== Game 2 ====
October 6, 2025 8:08 pm (CDT) at American Family Field in Milwaukee, Wisconsin
Team	1	2	3	4	5	6	7	8	9	R	H	E
Chicago	3	0	0	0	0	0	0	0	0	**3**	**4**	**1**
**Milwaukee**	3	0	1	3	0	0	0	0	X	**7**	**11**	**0**
WP: Jacob Misiorowski (1–0) LP: Shota Imanaga (0–1); Home runs: CHI: Seiya Suzuki (1); MIL: Andrew Vaughn (1), William Contreras (1), Jackson Chourio (1); Attendance: 42,787; Boxscore

In game two, Seiya Suzuki led off the scoring with a three-run homer in the first. However, Cubs starter Shota Imanaga quickly surrendered the lead, giving up a three-run shot in the bottom of the first. Imanaga allowed another homer in the third before being lifted with two outs in the third. Daniel Palencia got out of the third, but surrendered another three-run homer in the fourth to give the Brewers a four-run lead. Neither team scored from there as the Brewers won 7–3. The loss put the Cubs on the brink of eliminations, down 2–0 in the three-game series.

==== Game 3 ====
October 8, 2025 4:08 pm (CDT) at Wrigley Field in Chicago, Illinois
Team	1	2	3	4	5	6	7	8	9	R	H	E
Milwaukee	1	0	0	1	0	0	1	0	0	**3**	**7**	**0**
**Chicago**	4	0	0	0	0	0	0	0	X	**4**	**8**	**0**
WP: Drew Pomeranz (1−0)) LP: Quinn Priester (0−1) Sv: Brad Keller (2); Home runs: MIL: Jake Bauers (1); CHI: Michael Busch (2); Attendance: 40,737; Boxscore

The series moved to Wrigley Field for game three. Jameson Taillon allowed a first inning run as the Brewers took an early 1–0. Michael Busch led off the bottom half of the first with this second homer of the series to tie the game. Pete Crow-Armstrong drove in two runs with a single and Ian Happ scored on a wild pitch as the Cubs led 4–1 after the first. Taillon allowed another run in the fourth to cut the lead to two. Taillon left after the fourth and Andrew Kittredge allowed a homer in the seventh to reduce the lead to 4–3. Brad Keller got the final four outs to give the Cubs the win and extend the series to at least four games.

==== Game 4 ====
October 9, 2025 8:08 pm (CDT) at Wrigley Field in Chicago, Illinois
Team	1	2	3	4	5	6	7	8	9	R	H	E
Milwaukee	0	0	0	0	0	0	0	0	0	**0**	**3**	**1**
**Chicago**	3	0	0	0	0	1	1	1	X	**6**	**10**	**0**
WP: Daniel Palencia (3–0) LP: Freddy Peralta (1–1); Home runs: MIL: None; CHC: Ian Happ (2), Kyle Tucker (1), Michael Busch (4); Attendance: 41,770; Boxscore

In another must-win game for the Cubs, Matthew Boyd pitched 4.2 innings of scoreless baseball while four relievers combined to shut out the Brewers. Ian Happ hit a three-run homer in the first to give the Cubs a 3–0 lead. Matt Shaw extended the lead in the sixth with a single and Kyle Tucker and Michael Busch homered as the Cubs won 6–0. The win evened the series at two games each with a decisive game five scheduled for Saturday in Milwaukee.

==== Game 5 ====
October 11, 2025 7:08 pm (CDT) at American Family Field in Milwaukee, Wisconsin 67 °F (19 °C), Clear, Roof Closed
Team	1	2	3	4	5	6	7	8	9	R	H	E
Chicago	0	1	0	0	0	0	0	0	0	**1**	**4**	**2**
**Milwaukee**	1	0	0	1	0	0	1	0	X	**3**	**6**	**0**
WP: Jacob Misiorowski (2–0) LP: Colin Rea (0–1) Sv: Abner Uribe (1); Home runs: CHC: Seiya Suzuki (2); MIL: William Contreras (2), Andrew Vaughn (2), Brice Turang (1); Attendance: 42,743; Boxscore

In the deciding gave five, both teams went with a bullpen game. The Cubs failed to score in the first, but Drew Pomeranz allowed a homer in the bottom of the first as the Cubs fell behind 1–0. Seiya Suzuki tied it in the top of the second with his second homer of the series. However, the Brewers added a run in the fourth off of Colin Rea and another in the seventh off of Andrew Kittredge to push the lead to two. The Cubs failed to score again and lost 3–1, ending their season.

==== Composite line score ====
2025 NLDS (3–2): Milwaukee Brewers over Chicago Cubs

Team	1	2	3	4	5	6	7	8	9	R	H	E
Chicago Cubs	11	1	0	0	0	2	1	1	1	**17**	**31**	**4**
**Milwaukee Brewers**	11	3	1	5	0	0	2	0	0	**22**	**39**	**1**
Total attendance: 210,715 Average attendance: 42,143

=== Postseason rosters ===
Playoff rosters
National League Wild Card Series

- Pitchers: 16 Matthew Boyd 17 Taylor Rogers 18 Shota Imanaga 24 Caleb Thielbar 38 Aaron Civale 40 Brad Keller 45 Drew Pomeranz 48 Daniel Palencia 50 Jameson Taillon 53 Colin Rea 59 Andrew Kittredge 99 Michael Soroka
- Catchers: 15 Carson Kelly 20 Reese McGuire 25 Moisés Ballesteros
- Infielders: 2 Nico Hoerner 3 Justin Turner 6 Matt Shaw 7 Dansby Swanson 29 Michael Busch
- Outfielders: 1 Willi Castro 4 Pete Crow-Armstrong 8 Ian Happ 13 Kevin Alcántara 27 Seiya Suzuki 30 Kyle Tucker

National League Division Series

- Pitchers: 16 Matthew Boyd 18 Shota Imanaga 24 Caleb Thielbar 32 Ben Brown 38 Aaron Civale 40 Brad Keller 45 Drew Pomeranz 48 Daniel Palencia 50 Jameson Taillon 53 Colin Rea 59 Andrew Kittredge 99 Michael Soroka
- Catchers: 15 Carson Kelly 20 Reese McGuire 25 Moisés Ballesteros
- Infielders: 2 Nico Hoerner 3 Justin Turner 6 Matt Shaw 7 Dansby Swanson 29 Michael Busch
- Outfielders: 1 Willi Castro 4 Pete Crow-Armstrong 8 Ian Happ 13 Kevin Alcántara 27 Seiya Suzuki 30 Kyle Tucker

== Statistics ==
=== Regular season ===
==== Batting ====
Note: Team leaders in each category are noted in bold

Note: G = Games played; AB = At bats; R = Runs; H = Hits; 2B = Doubles; 3B = Triples; HR = Home runs; RBI = Runs batted in; SB = Stolen bases; BB = Walks; K = Strikeouts; AVG = Batting average; OBP = On-base percentage; SLG = Slugging percentage; TB = Total bases

Player	G	AB	R	H	2B	3B	HR	RBI	SB	BB	K	AVG	OBP	SLG	TB
Kevin Alcántara	10	11	2	4	0	0	0	1	1	1	4	.364	.417	.364	4
Miguel Amaya	28	96	14	27	9	0	4	25	0	4	22	.281	.314	.500	48
Moisés Ballesteros	20	57	12	17	2	1	2	11	0	9	12	.298	.394	.474	27
Jon Berti	51	100	12	21	2	0	0	2	11	5	22	.210	.262	.230	23
Vidal Bruján	36	45	6	10	3	0	0	3	2	1	12	.222	.234	.289	13
Michael Busch	155	524	78	137	25	**5**	**34**	90	4	56	139	.261	.343	**.523**	274
Owen Caissie	12	26	4	5	1	0	1	4	0	1	11	.192	.222	.346	9
Willi Castro	34	100	10	17	2	1	1	6	1	8	27	.170	.245	.240	24
Pete Crow-Armstrong	157	591	**91**	146	**37**	4	31	95	**35**	29	155	.247	.287	.481	**284**
Ian Happ	150	569	87	138	32	0	23	79	6	**87**	151	.243	.342	.420	239
Nico Hoerner	156	**599**	89	**178**	29	4	7	61	29	39	49	**.297**	.345	.394	236
Carson Kelly	111	369	48	92	13	1	17	50	2	45	80	.249	.333	.428	158
Nicky Lopez	14	18	2	1	0	0	0	1	0	4	3	.056	.227	.056	1
Reese McGuire	44	133	17	30	2	0	9	24	0	4	27	.226	.245	.444	59
Colin Rea	1	1	0	0	0	0	0	0	0	0	1	.000	.000	.000	0
Carlos Santana	8	19	0	2	1	0	0	2	0	2	5	.105	.105	.158	3
Matt Shaw	126	393	57	89	21	3	13	44	17	38	94	.226	.295	.394	155
Seiya Suzuki	151	571	75	140	31	3	32	**103**	5	71	164	.245	.326	.478	273
Dansby Swanson	**159**	590	84	144	24	3	24	77	20	47	**168**	.244	.300	.417	246
Kyle Tucker	136	500	91	133	25	4	22	73	25	87	88	.266	**.377**	.464	232
Justin Turner	80	169	14	37	7	0	3	18	2	17	37	.219	.288	.314	53
Gage Workman	9	14	0	3	1	0	0	2	1	1	6	.214	.267	.286	4
**Team totals**	162	5495	793	1371	267	29	223	771	161	554	1277	.249	.320	.430	2365

==== Pitching ====
Note: Team leaders in each category are noted in bold

Note: W = Wins; L = Losses; ERA = Earned run average G = Games pitched; GS = Games started; SV = Saves; IP = Innings pitched; H = Hits allowed; R = Runs allowed; ER = Earned runs allowed; BB = Walks allowed; K = Strikeouts

Player	W	L	ERA	G	GS	SV	IP	H	R	ER	BB	K
Javier Assad	4	1	3.65	8	7	0	37.0	33	15	15	12	23
Jon Berti	0	0	7.36	4	0	0	3.2	4	3	3	4	0
Matthew Boyd	**14**	**8**	**3.21**	31	**31**	0	**179.2**	**154**	69	64	42	**154**
Ryan Brasier	0	1	4.50	28	1	0	26.0	27	13	13	5	20
Ben Brown	5	**8**	5.92	25	15	1	106.1	121	**73**	**70**	32	121
Génesis Cabrera	0	0	8.68	9	0	0	9.1	10	9	9	3	8
Aaron Civale	1	0	2.08	5	0	1	13.0	7	3	3	0	14
Tom Cosgrove	0	0	2.25	2	0	0	4.0	3	1	1	1	3
Chris Flexen	5	1	3.09	21	1	1	43.2	38	18	15	12	22
Michael Fulmer	0	0	0.00	2	0	0	3.0	2	0	0	0	1
Porter Hodge	2	2	6.27	36	0	2	33.0	34	24	23	18	40
Gavin Hollowell	0	0	4.82	7	0	0	9.1	9	5	5	7	10
Cade Horton	11	4	2.67	23	22	0	118.0	95	40	35	33	97
Shota Imanaga	9	**8**	3.73	25	25	0	144.2	117	62	60	26	117
Brad Keller	4	2	2.07	**68**	1	3	69.2	45	18	16	22	75
Andrew Kittredge	2	1	3.32	23	0	0	21.2	15	9	8	3	32
Brooks Kriske	0	0	0.00	4	0	0	6.0	2	0	0	5	4
Luke Little	0	0	3.38	2	0	0	2.2	1	2	1	6	4
Julian Merryweather	0	1	5.79	21	0	0	18.2	23	13	12	11	15
Eli Morgan	0	1	12.27	7	0	0	7.1	12	10	10	3	4
Daniel Palencia	1	6	2.91	54	0	**22**	52.2	44	19	17	16	61
Nate Pearson	0	1	9.20	11	0	0	14.2	22	15	15	10	7
Drew Pomeranz	2	2	2.17	57	4	1	49.2	38	14	12	15	57
Ryan Pressly	2	3	4.35	44	0	5	41.1	46	24	20	17	28
Colin Rea	10	7	4.10	31	26	1	153.2	153	**73**	**70**	**43**	120
Ethan Roberts	1	0	6.00	10	0	0	9.0	10	6	6	2	6
Taylor Rogers	1	0	5.09	17	0	0	17.2	18	10	10	4	19
Michael Soroka	0	0	1.08	6	1	0	8.1	4	5	1	5	8
Justin Steele	3	1	4.76	4	4	0	22.2	21	12	12	5	21
Jameson Taillon	11	7	3.68	23	23	0	129.2	110	54	53	27	98
Caleb Thielbar	3	4	2.64	67	0	1	58.0	38	17	17	13	56
Jordan Wicks	0	1	6.28	8	0	1	14.1	24	12	10	1	13
**Team totals**	92	70	3.81	162	162	44	1435.0	1284	649	607	405	1265

=== Postseason ===
==== Batting ====
Note: G = Games played; AB = At bats; R = Runs; H = Hits; 2B = Doubles; 3B = Triples; HR = Home runs; RBI = Runs batted in; SB = Stolen bases; BB = Walks; K = Strikeouts; AVG = Batting average; OBP = On-base percentage; SLG = Slugging percentage; TB = Total bases

Player	G	AB	R	H	2B	3B	HR	RBI	SB	BB	K	AVG	OBP	SLG	TB
Moisés Ballesteros	3	3	0	0	0	0	0	0	0	0	1	.000	.000	.000	0
Michael Busch	8	27	4	8	0	0	4	4	0	3	4	.296	.387	.741	20
Pete Crow-Armstrong	8	27	0	5	0	0	0	3	1	1	12	.185	.214	.185	5
Ian Happ	8	30	3	3	1	0	2	4	0	2	13	.100	.156	.333	10
Nico Hoerner	8	31	4	13	1	0	1	2	1	0	2	.419	.44	.548	17
Carson Kelly	8	28	2	5	0	0	1	1	0	1	12	.179	.233	.286	8
Matt Shaw	8	17	0	2	0	0	0	1	1	5	7	.118	.318	.118	2
Seiya Suzuki	8	31	4	7	3	0	3	5	0	1	10	.226	.250	.613	19
Dansby Swanson	8	26	1	4	1	0	0	1	0	3	15	.154	.241	.192	5
Kyle Tucker	8	27	5	7	0	0	1	1	0	5	5	.259	.375	.370	10
Justin Turner	1	2	0	1	0	0	0	0	0	0	0	.500	.500	.500	1
**Team totals**	8	249	23	55	6	0	12	22	3	21	81	.221	.288	.390	97

==== Pitching ====
Note: W = Wins; L = Losses; ERA = Earned run average G = Games pitched; GS = Games started; SV = Saves; IP = Innings pitched; H = Hits allowed; R = Runs allowed; ER = Earned runs allowed; BB = Walks allowed; K = Strikeouts

Player	W	L	ERA	G	GS	SV	IP	H	R	ER	BB	K
Matthew Boyd	0	1	2.79	3	3	0	9.2	10	7	3	5	9
Ben Brown	0	0	0.00	1	0	0	2.0	1	0	0	2	3
Aaron Civale	0	0	0.00	1	0	0	4.1	3	0	0	0	3
Shota Imanaga	0	1	8.10	2	1	0	6.2	8	6	6	2	6
Brad Keller	0	0	1.59	5	0	2	5.2	2	1	1	2	5
Andrew Kittredge	0	1	5.40	5	1	1	5.0	5	3	3	1	3
Daniel Palencia	3	0	3.52	6	0	0	7.2	5	3	3	2	3
Drew Pomeranz	1	0	1.50	6	1	0	6.0	1	1	1	0	6
Colin Rea	0	1	1.17	3	0	0	7.2	9	1	1	3	3
Taylor Rogers	0	0	0.00	1	0	0	1.0	0	0	0	0	0
Michael Soroka	0	0	16.20	2	0	0	1.2	5	3	3	2	1
Jameson Taillon	0	0	2.25	2	2	0	8.0	7	2	2	1	7
Caleb Thielbar	0	0	0.00	5	0	0	3.2	2	0	0	3	5
**Team totals**	4	4	3.00	8	8	3	69.0	58	27	23	23	54

== Farm system ==
On February 18, the Cubs announced the minor league managers for their farm system.

Level	Team	League	Manager	Location	Ballpark
AAA	Iowa Cubs	International League	Marty Pevey	Des Moines, Iowa	Principal Park
AA	Knoxville Smokies	Southern League	Lance Rymel	Knoxville, Tennessee	Covenant Health Park
High-A	South Bend Cubs	Midwest League	Nick Lovullo	South Bend, Indiana	Four Winds Field at Coveleski Stadium
Single-A	Myrtle Beach Pelicans	Carolina League	Yovanny Cuevas	Myrtle Beach, South Carolina	TicketReturn.com Field
Rookie	ACL Cubs	Arizona Complex League	Corey Ray	Mesa, Arizona	Sloan Park
Rookie	DSL Cubs	Dominican Summer League	Enrique Wilson; Carlos Ramirez	Boca Chica, Dominican Republic	Baseball City Complex
