= Kevin Alcántara =

Dominican baseball player (born 2002)

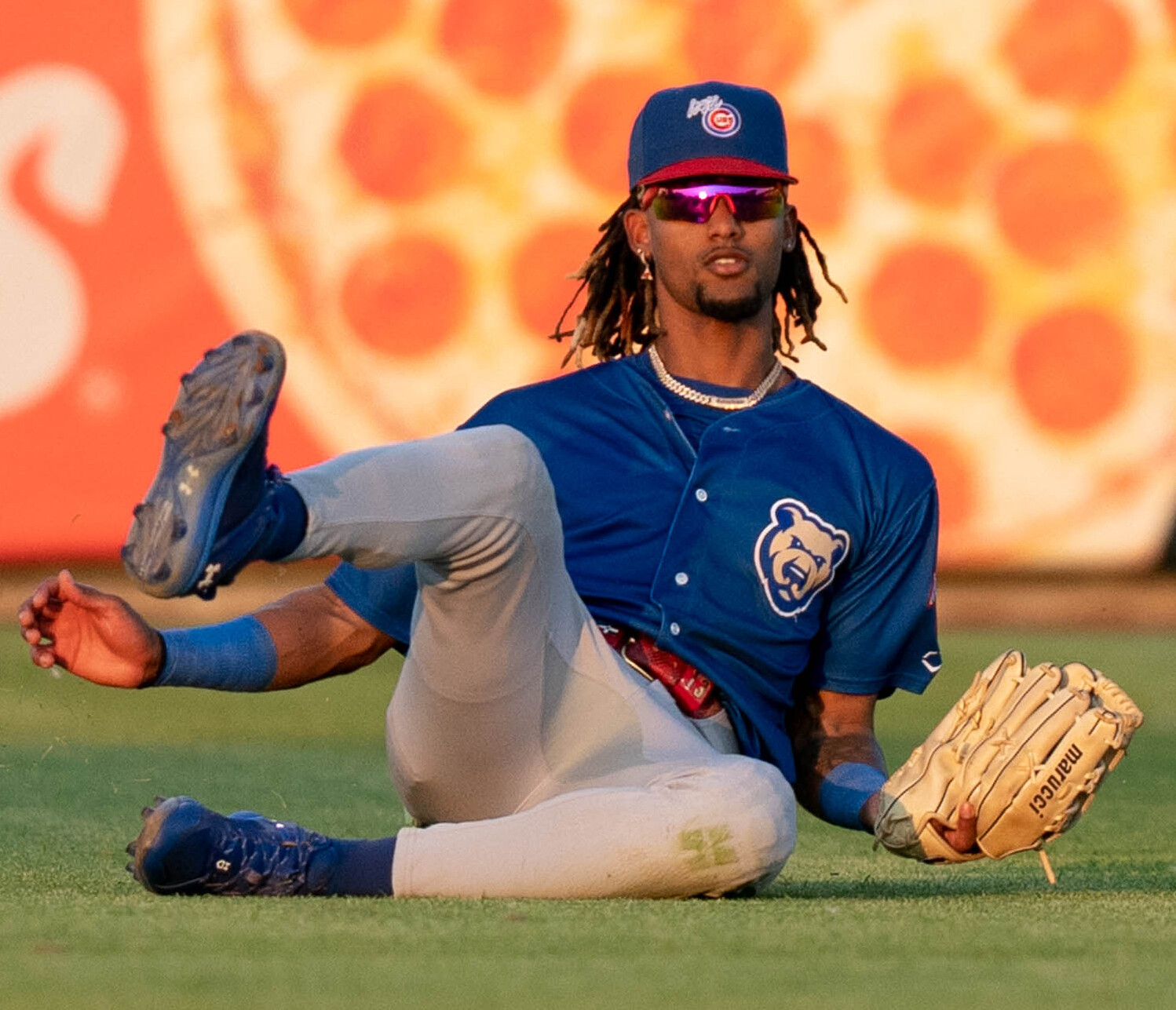
- Alcántara with the Iowa Cubs in 2025

Chicago Cubs – No. 13
- Outfielder
- Born: July 12, 2002 (age 24); Santo Domingo, Dominican Republic
- Bats: Right Throws: Right

MLB debut
- September 25, 2024, for the Chicago Cubs

MLB statistics (through 2026 season)
- Batting average: .239
- Home runs: 1
- Runs batted in: 7
- Stats at Baseball Reference

Teams
- Chicago Cubs (2024–present)

Kevin Alcántara (born July 12, 2002) is a Dominican professional baseball outfielder for the Chicago Cubs of Major League Baseball (MLB). He made his MLB debut in 2024.

== Career ==
=== New York Yankees ===
Alcántara signed with the New York Yankees as an international free agent on July 12, 2018. He spent his first professional season in 2019 with the Dominican Summer League Yankees and rookie-level Gulf Coast League Yankees. Alcántara did not play in a game in 2020 due to the cancellation of the minor league season because of the COVID-19 pandemic.

Alcántara started 2021 with the rookie-level Florida Complex League Yankees.

=== Chicago Cubs ===
On July 29, 2021, the Yankees traded Alcántara and Alexander Vizcaíno to the Chicago Cubs in exchange for Anthony Rizzo. The Cubs assigned Alcántara to the rookie-level Arizona Complex League Cubs. Alcántara spent the 2022 campaign with the Single-A Myrtle Beach Pelicans, slashing .273/.360/.451 with 15 home runs, 85 RBI, and 14 stolen bases. On November 15, 2022, the Cubs added Alcántara to their 40-man roster to protect him from the Rule 5 draft. Alcántara was optioned to the High-A South Bend Cubs to begin the 2023 season. In 95 games for South Bend, he batted .286/.341/.466 with 12 home runs, 66 RBI, and 15 stolen bases.

Alcántara was optioned to the Double-A Tennessee Smokies to begin the 2024 season. In August, the Cubs promoted him to the Triple-A Iowa Cubs. On September 25, 2024, the Cubs promoted Alcántara to the major leagues, and he made his major league debut that night, hitting a single off closer Carlos Estévez. In three games for Chicago, he went 1-for-10.

Alcántara was optioned to Triple-A Iowa to begin the 2025 season. He made 10 appearances for Chicago during the regular season, going 4-for-11 (.364) with one RBI, one stolen base, and one walk. On October 16, 2025, Alcántara underwent surgery to repair a sports hernia.

Alcántara was optioned to Triple-A Iowa to begin the 2026 season. On August 3, 2026, Alcántara hit his first career home run against Los Angeles Dodgers starting pitcher Justin Wrobleski.
