= Moisés Ballesteros =

Venezuelan baseball player (born 2003)

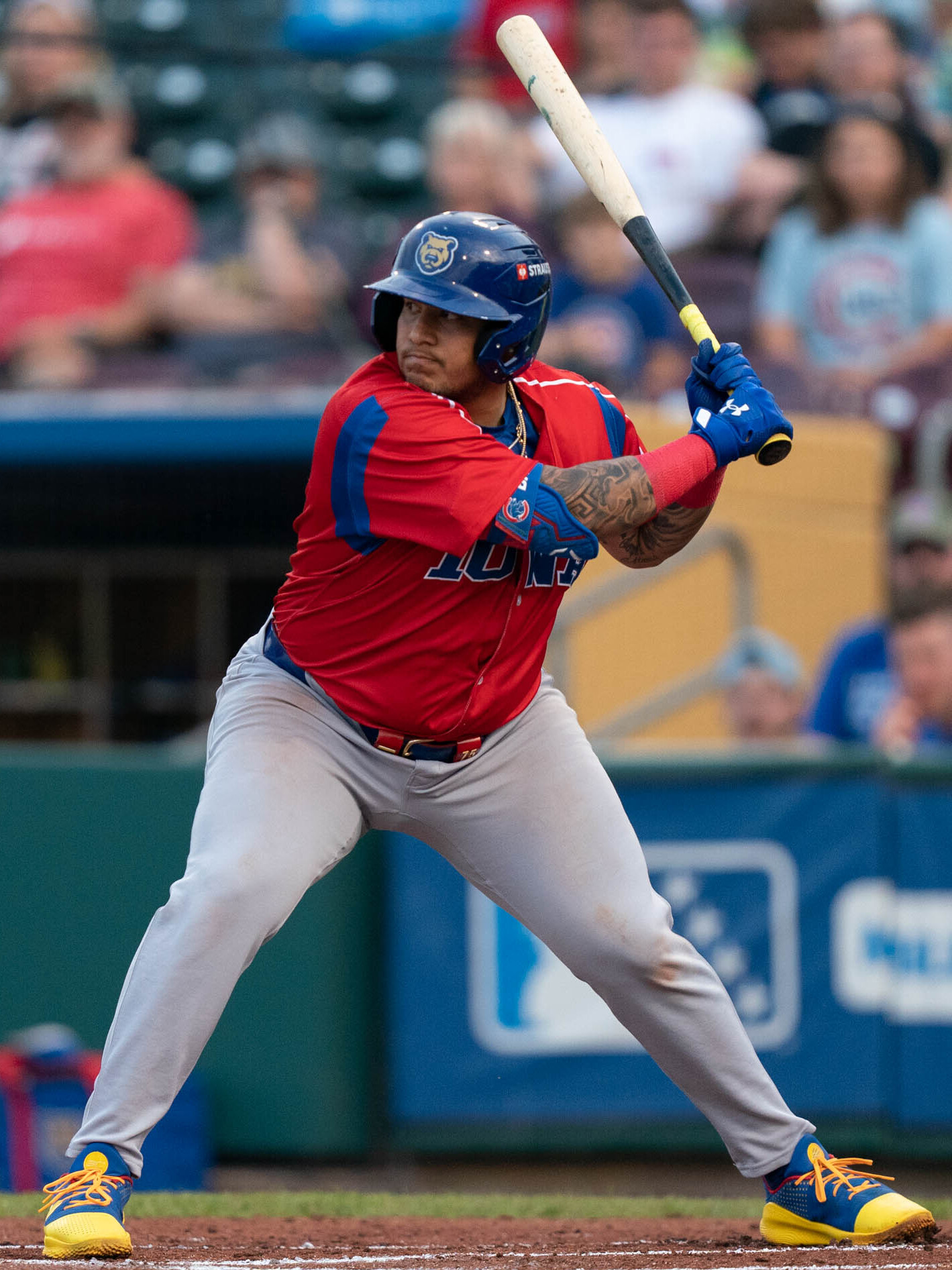
- Ballesteros with the Iowa Cubs in 2025

Los Angeles Angels – No. 13
- Designated hitter / Catcher
- Born: November 8, 2003 (age 23); Los Teques, Venezuela
- Bats: Left Throws: Right

MLB debut
- May 13, 2025, for the Chicago Cubs

MLB statistics (through 2026 season)
- Batting average: .227
- Home runs: 11
- Runs batted in: 46
- Stats at Baseball Reference

Teams
- Chicago Cubs (2025–2026); Los Angeles Angels (2026–present)

Moisés Alejandro Ballesteros (born November 8, 2003) is a Venezuelan professional baseball designated hitter and catcher for the Los Angeles Angels of Major League Baseball (MLB). He has previously played in MLB for the Chicago Cubs.

== Career ==
=== Chicago Cubs ===
Ballesteros signed with the Chicago Cubs as an international free agent on January 15, 2021. He made his professional debut that year with the Dominican Summer League Cubs. He played 2022 with the rookie-level Arizona Complex League Cubs and Single-A Myrtle Beach Pelicans.

Ballesteros played 2023 with Myrtle Beach, the High-A South Bend Cubs, and the Double-A Tennessee Smokies, and was named the Cubs' Minor League Player of the Year. In 117 appearances split between the three affiliates, he accumulated a .285/.375/.449 batting line with 14 home runs, 64 RBI, and seven stolen bases. He returned to Tennessee to start the 2024 season and was promoted to the Triple-A Iowa Cubs during the season. Ballesteros was named the Cubs' Minor League Player of the Year for the second consecutive season after hitting .289/.354/.471 with 19 home runs and 78 RBI in 124 appearances split between Tennessee and Iowa. After the season, he played in the Arizona Fall League.

Ballesteros was assigned to Triple-A Iowa to begin the 2025 season, hitting .368 with four home runs, 18 RBI, and three stolen bases over his first 34 games. On May 13, 2025, Ballesteros was promoted to the major leagues for the first time, going 0-for-4 with four groundouts. On May 16, Ballesteros recorded his first MLB hit and RBI against Yoendrys Gómez of the Chicago White Sox. On September 13, Ballesteros hit his first career home run off of Tampa Bay Rays starter Drew Rasmussen; coincidentally, the ball landed in the same section that former Cub Anthony Rizzo was seated in.

On April 27, 2026, Ballesteros hit his first career grand slam off of Randy Vásquez of the San Diego Padres.

=== Los Angeles Angels ===
On August 3, 2026, the Cubs traded Ballesteros and Mason McGwire to the Los Angeles Angels in exchange for Ryan Zeferjahn. On September 3 against the New York Yankees, Ballesteros hit his first home run as an Angel.
