= Eugenio López Rodea =

Business executive (1934–2022)

Eugenio López Rodea (28 June 1934 – 20 May 2022) was a business executive and the founder of Mexican beverage company Jumex.

== Early life and education ==
Born in Mexico City, Mexico, his father, Vicente López Resines, was the founder of La Costeña, one of the largest producers of preserves worldwide. From a young age he learned about the culture of entrepreneurship.

== Career ==
In 1961, López Rodea founded the Frugo brand, predecessor of Grupo Jumex, which today is the largest juice brand in Latin America. Three months after the founding of Frugo, the company began producing a 150-milliliter can that contained peaches with 20 employees. In 1964 he began a process to register the 'Jumex' trademark with the slogan 'the blue can' and to change the previous packaging. This was the beginning of what is now a multinational company with a presence in more than 40 countries.

== Personal life ==
He was married to Isabel Alonso who died in 2017. Their only son, Museo Jumex founder Eugenio López Alonso is the current president of the Jumex Foundation and has stood out for being one of the most important patrons of art of the 21st century.

In May 2022, López Rodea died of natural causes in Mexico City.
