= Mark Hewitt (potter) =

British potter

Mark Hewitt (born 1955) is an English-born studio potter living in the small town of Pittsboro, North Carolina outside of Chapel Hill, North Carolina. In 2015 he received a United States Artists Fellowship, for contributions to the creative landscape and arts ecosystems of the country. He was a finalist for the 2015 American Craft Council/Balvenie Rare Craft Fellowship, for contributions to the maintenance and revival of traditional or rare craft techniques.

In 2014 he was awarded a Voulkos Fellowship at the Archie Bray Foundation for the Ceramic Arts in Helena, Montana, for outstanding contributions to the ceramic arts.

He is known for his functional pottery and especially for his large scale wood-fired, salt-glazed ceramic pots, known as "monster pots." His work is influenced by Asian pottery, African pottery, North Carolina pottery, and especially the English pottery of Bernard Leach. Hewitt was taught by Leach's first student, Michael Cardew.

Hewitt was born in England in 1955 not far from the Spode china factory in Stoke-on-Trent. His father and grandfather were both managers at Spode, so he grew up with that ceramics tradition. While at Bristol University in 1975, however, Hewitt was attracted to the very different English studio pottery tradition when a friend loaned him a copy of Leach's seminal work, "A Potter's Book". Thereafter, he sought out opportunities to learn studio pottery, becoming Cardew's apprentice at the Wenford Bridge Pottery in Cornwall.

Hewitt's decision ultimately to settle in North Carolina has influenced his work profoundly, as have his travels to Africa and Southeast Asia. The North Carolina influence can be seen, for instance, in his use of alkaline glazes, runs of glass, and use of contrasting colors of clay. At the same time, his English roots may be seen in his close control of the potter's wheel, his crisp lines, and in the North Devon-style handles of many of his pots.

Hewitt makes a complete line of functional ceramic pots, and much of his work is intended for everyday use. He also makes large-scale vessels of a more sculptural vein, such as his grave markers. His work can be found in the permanent collection of several American museums. He was also the co-curator, with Nancy Sweezy, of "The Potter's Eye: Art and Tradition in North Carolina Pottery," at the North Carolina Museum of Art in Raleigh, North Carolina (October 2005 – March 2006). In 2017 he edited the book Great Pots from the Traditions of North & South Carolina, published by the North Carolina Pottery Center in Seagrove, North Carolina. He was President of the Board of the North Carolina Pottery Center from 2013 - 2017.

== Permanent collections ==
- Renwick Gallery, Smithsonian Institution, Washington, DC
- High Museum, Atlanta, GA
- Philadelphia Museum of Art, Philadelphia, PA
- Frederick R. Weisman Art Museum, Minneapolis, MN
- Chrysler Museum, Norfolk, VA
- National Arboretum, Washington, DC
- Spencer Museum, Kansas City, KS
- Mint Museums, Charlotte, NC
- Ackland Museum, University of North Carolina, Chapel Hill, NC
- Cameron Art Museum, Wilmington, NC
- Rocky Mount Arts center, Rocky Mount, NC
- North Carolina Pottery Center, Seagrove, NC
- American Museum of Ceramic Art, Pomona, CA
- Minneapolis Institute of Art, MN
- Nasher Museum of Art, Duke University, Durham, NC
- Hickory Museum of Art, Hickory, NC
- Gregg Museum, North Carolina State University, Raleigh, NC

== Sources ==
- Edward LeBow, "Mark Hewitt: Village Potter," 64 American Craft No. 6 (December 2004 – January 2005) (cover article).
- Wendy Summers, "Making Monster Pots with Mark Hewitt," Clay Times (November – December 2004) (cover article)
- Hewitt, Mark. "Mark Hewitt." In Choosing Craft: The Artist's Viewpoint, edited by Vicki Halper and Diane Douglas, 267–271. Chapel Hill: University of North Carolina Press, 2009.
