= Jumex (disambiguation) =

Jumex can refer to:

- Jumex, the nectar or juice brand popular in Mexico
- La Colección Jumex, an art collection housed on the Jumex factory grounds
- Trade name of selegiline, an anti-Parkinson drug
