= Erect, North Carolina =

- Unincorporated community
- Location of Erect in North Carolina
- Coordinates: 35°33′31″N 79°39′34″W
- Country: United States
- State: North Carolina
- County: Randolph
- Named after: Posture compliment
- Elevation: 520 ft (160 m)
- Time zone: UTC-5 (Eastern (EST))
  - Summer (DST): UTC-4 (EDT)
- Zip code: 27341
- Area code: 336
- GNIS feature ID: 1011101

Erect, North Carolina (/ˈiː.rɛkt/ EE-rekt) is an unincorporated community in Randolph County, North Carolina, United States, and part of the Piedmont Triad metropolitan region. Erect is located on NC 42, seven miles east of the North Carolina Zoo in Asheboro, and two miles west of Coleridge. Erect was founded in the 18th century by German and English settlers, along with the nearby communities of Steeds, Sophia, Whynot, Hemp, and Lonely. Many of these settlers were known for their pottery-making skills. A post office called Erect was established in 1883, and remained in operation until it was discontinued in 1935. In 1889, Erect had a population of 39 inhabitants.

The 15-square mile (30 km^{2}) region surrounding the town of Seagrove, twelve miles to the southeast, is known as the "Pottery Capital of North Carolina." Erect is located in the vicinity of the "North Carolina Pottery Highway", a collection of approximately 100 potteries and galleries along NC 705 in Randolph and Moore counties.

Goss Lake, Goss Lake Dam, and the Lambert Mill Dam are located in the Erect quad.

== See also ==
- List of unincorporated communities in North Carolina
