= Sweezy =

Sweezy is a surname. Notable people with the surname include:

- Carl Sweezy (1881–1953), American painter
- J. R. Sweezy (born 1989), American football player
- Nancy Sweezy (1921–2010), American artist, author, folklorist, advocate, scholar, and preservationist
- Paul Sweezy (1910–2004), Marxist economist, political activist, publisher, and editor
