= Cam Thomas (defensive tackle) =

American football player (born 1986)

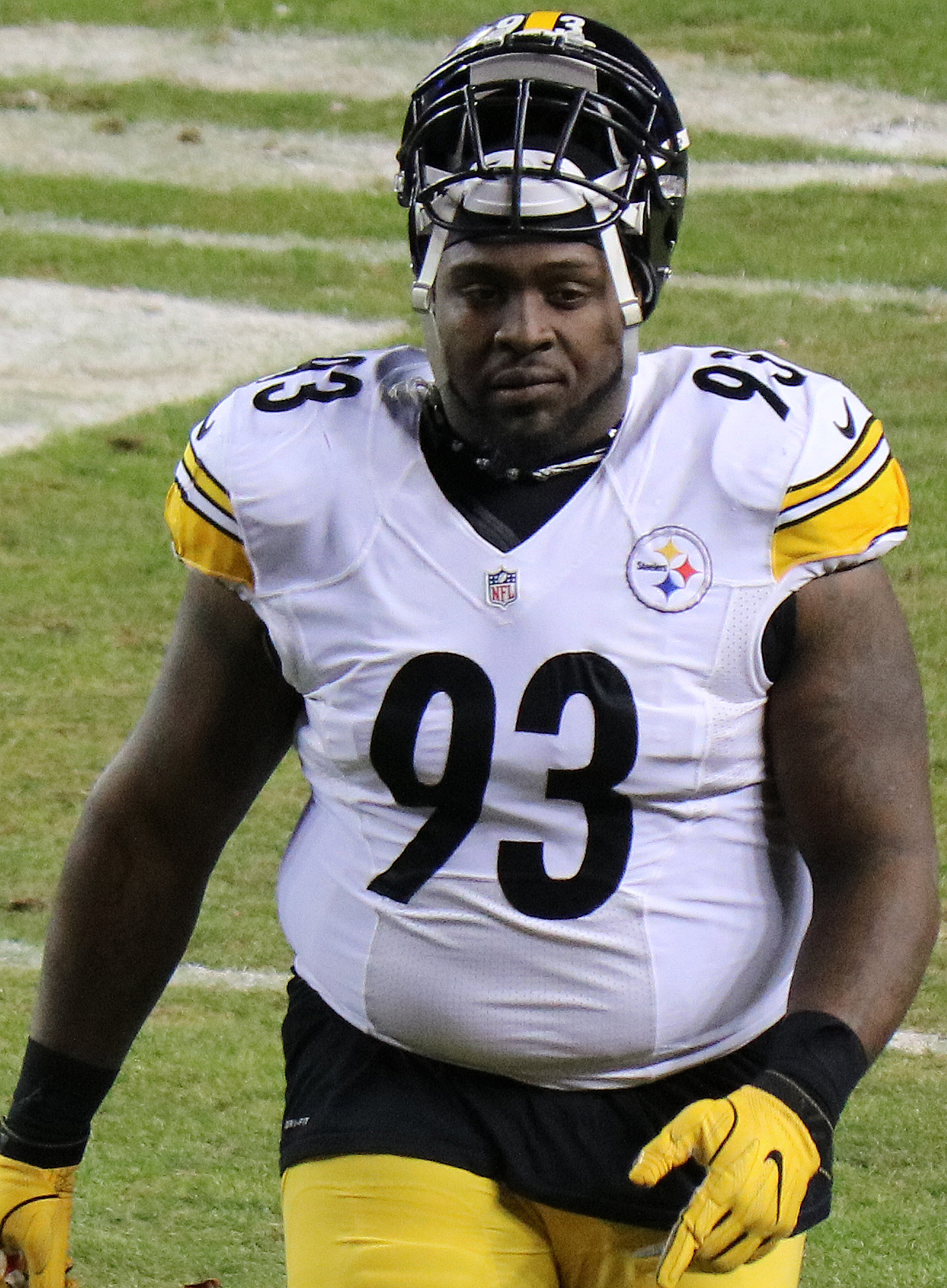
- Thomas with the Pittsburgh Steelers in 2016

No. 76, 93, 92, 96
- Position: Nose tackle

Personal information
- Born: December 12, 1986 (age 39); Eagle Springs, North Carolina, U.S.
- Listed height: 6 ft 4 in (1.93 m)
- Listed weight: 335 lb (152 kg)

Career information
- High school: North Moore (Robbins, North Carolina)
- College: North Carolina (2005–2009)
- NFL draft: 2010: 5th round, 146th overall pick

Career history
- San Diego Chargers (2010–2013); Pittsburgh Steelers (2014–2015); Los Angeles Rams (2016); Kansas City Chiefs (2017); Northern Arizona Wranglers (2021)

Career NFL statistics
- Total tackles: 115
- Sacks: 7.5
- Pass deflections: 4
- Interceptions: 1
- Stats at Pro Football Reference

Cameron Jamel Thomas (born December 12, 1986) is an American former professional football player who was a nose tackle in the National Football League (NFL). He played college football for the North Carolina Tar Heels and was selected by the San Diego Chargers in the fifth round of the 2010 NFL draft. Thomas was also a member of the Pittsburgh Steelers, Los Angeles Rams, Kansas City Chiefs, and Northern Arizona Wranglers.

== Professional career ==
=== Pre-draft ===
Thomas was considered one of the top defensive tackle prospects for the 2010 NFL draft.

Pre-draft measurables
Height	Weight	Arm length	Hand span	40-yard dash	10-yard split	20-yard split	20-yard shuttle	Three-cone drill	Vertical jump	Broad jump	Bench press
6 ft 4 in (1.93 m)	330 lb (150 kg)	34 3/4 in (0.88 m)	10 1/2 in (0.27 m)	5.14 s	1.78 s	2.94 s	4.78 s	7.66 s	29.0 in (0.74 m)	8 ft 6 in (2.59 m)	31 reps
All values from NFL Combine/Pro Day

=== San Diego Chargers ===
Thomas was selected by the San Diego Chargers in the fifth round (146th overall) of the 2010 NFL draft. During his rookie season in 2010, Thomas played 6 games and has 2 sacks on 7 tackles. In 2011, he played all 16 games with 2 starts making 19 tackles with 4 sacks. In 2012, he played 16 games with 21 tackles. In 2013, he played 16 games with 26 tackles and an interception. He became a free agent after the 2013 season.

=== Pittsburgh Steelers ===
Thomas signed with the Pittsburgh Steelers on March 14, 2014. During his first season with Pittsburgh in 2014, he played in all 16 regular season games, recording 19 tackles (11 solo) and half a sack. In the Steelers' opening round playoff game against the Baltimore Ravens, Thomas assisted on one tackle.

In 2015, he played in 15 regular season games, recording 11 tackles (9 solo). In the Steelers' first playoff game against the Cincinnati Bengals, he assisted on one tackle and recovered an A. J. McCarron fumble, returning it for 11 yards. The turnover would help lead the Steelers to a Chris Boswell field goal in a game they eventually won 18–16. Thomas would also play in the Steelers' second playoff game against the Denver Broncos.

=== Los Angeles Rams ===
On June 6, 2016, Thomas along with Dylan Thompson, Benson Browne, and Terrence Magee signed contracts with the Los Angeles Rams. On September 3, 2016, he was released by the Rams as part of final roster cuts. Three days after his release, he re-signed with the Rams.

=== Kansas City Chiefs ===
On June 8, 2017, Thomas signed with the Kansas City Chiefs. He was released on September 2, 2017. On November 13, 2017, Thomas re-signed with the Chiefs. He was released on November 23, 2017.

=== Northern Arizona Wranglers ===
On October 10, 2020, it was announced that Thomas had signed with the Northern Arizona Wranglers of the Indoor Football League (IFL) for the team's inaugural 2021 season. Thomas became a free agent following the 2021 season.

== NFL career statistics ==
Legend
**Bold**	Career high

=== Regular season ===
Year	Team	Games		Tackles					Interceptions					Fumbles			
Year	Team	GP	GS	Cmb	Solo	Ast	Sck	TFL	Int	Yds	TD	Lng	PD	FF	FR	Yds	TD
2010	SDG	6	0	7	7	0	2.0	2	0	0	0	0	0	0	0	0	0
2011	SDG	**16**	2	20	13	**7**	**4.0**	**6**	0	0	0	0	1	0	0	0	0
2012	SDG	**16**	3	20	14	6	0.0	1	0	0	0	0	0	0	0	0	0
2013	SDG	**16**	**10**	**23**	**17**	6	0.0	4	**1**	0	0	0	**2**	0	0	0	0
2014	PIT	**16**	9	18	11	**7**	0.5	3	0	0	0	0	0	0	0	0	0
2015	PIT	**16**	1	11	9	2	0.0	3	0	0	0	0	0	0	0	0	0
2016	LAR	**16**	2	15	11	4	1.0	1	0	0	0	0	0	0	0	0	0
2017	KAN	1	0	1	1	0	0.0	0	0	0	0	0	1	0	0	0	0
		103	27	115	83	32	7.5	20	1	0	0	0	4	0	0	0	0

=== Playoffs ===
Year	Team	Games		Tackles					Interceptions					Fumbles			
Year	Team	GP	GS	Cmb	Solo	Ast	Sck	TFL	Int	Yds	TD	Lng	PD	FF	FR	Yds	TD
2013	SDG	**2**	**1**	**3**	**3**	0	**1.0**	**1**	0	0	0	0	0	0	0	0	0
2014	PIT	1	0	1	0	**1**	0.0	0	0	0	0	0	0	0	0	0	0
2015	PIT	**2**	0	2	1	**1**	0.0	0	0	0	0	0	0	0	**1**	**11**	0
		5	1	6	4	2	1.0	1	0	0	0	0	0	0	1	11	0
