= La Costeña =

La Costeña may refer to:

- La Costeña (airline), a Nicaraguan airline
- La Costeña (food company), a Mexican company
