= Frankfurt (photograph) =

Photograph by Andreas Gurksy

Frankfurt is a colour photograph created by German photographer Andreas Gursky in 2007. It was created by his usual method of digital manipulation. It has a six copies edition. It depicts a scene taking place at the boarding lounge of the Frankfurt Airport, in Germany.

== Description ==
The photograph depicts a usual scene at airports, showing several passengers and other people while awaiting to board. The photograph is divided in two parts, the first shows several people at the boarding lounge, and the second and the largest presents the massive board, who gives a gigantic dimension and is the main point of attraction of the picture, with the lists of international airports, gates and times. The board represents a different kind of map of the world, where everything is reduced to a list of assorted data, cold and impersonal. The human presence in the photograph is dwarfed in relation to the human made denaturalization of the world. However, a closer inspection of the display panel shows that it presents exclusively the departure times of that day, from the top left to the bottom right edge of the board, as a result of the digital manipulation by the artist. The Kunstmuseum Basel website states: "Here Gursky has poured the duration of a day into an instantaneous image, creating a paradoxical space-time parallelism."

== Art market ==
A print of the photograph was sold by $2,098,500 at Sotheby's, London, at 9 November 2010.

== Public collections ==
There are prints of the photograph at the Stedelijk Museum, in Amsterdam, the Kunstmuseum Basel, and at the Museo Jumex, in Mexico City.
