= Owens Pottery =

Owens Pottery may refer to:

- J. B. Owens Pottery Company - a defunct Ohio pottery that operated around the turn of the 20th century
- "Original" Owens Pottery - the oldest, continuously operating pottery in North Carolina founded in 1895
