= Luck's Incorporated =

Food production company based in North Carolina, US

Coordinates: 35.534736°N 79.768514°W

Luck's, Incorporated
- Company type: Subsidiary
- Industry: Canned food
- Founded: 1947 (Seagrove, North Carolina, United States)
- Key people: Ivey B. Luck, Alfred Spencer and H. Clay Presnell
- Products: Luck's: Pinto Beans, Kidney Beans, Blackeye Peas, Fried Apples, Chicken Dumplings
- Parent: Faribault Foods
- Website: www.lucksfoods.com

Luck's Incorporated was a food production company founded in Seagrove, North Carolina, in 1947, which produced a line of canned bean and other canned food products. For a period of time, it was one of the largest employers in the area and its canned food products were a staple in many Southern households. It is a brand of Faribault Foods, after a divestment by ConAgra in 2010.

== History ==
The company was founded as the Mountain View Cannery in 1947 by Ivey B. Luck, Alfred Spencer & H. Clay Presnell. Spencer & Presnell later sold out to Luck and the establishment became known as Luck's. Luck's specialized in pinto beans and other canned vegetables and food products, employed many Seagrove and surrounding area families, and was a major buyer of vegetable, fruit, and poultry farms in the Randolph County Area and from around the region. Luck's canned food products were sold across much of the Southeast during the 1950s and is still a popular brand today.

== Merger and acquisition history ==
In 1967, Luck's merged with American Home Products. In 2000, the food interests of American Home Products, known as International Home Foods, were acquired by ConAgra Foods.

In 2010, the brand was sold to Arizona Canning Company, a subsidiary of La Costeña, for US$14 million. In 2014, La Costeña acquired Faribault Foods and merged Arizona Canning into Faribault.

== Headquarters and cannery ==
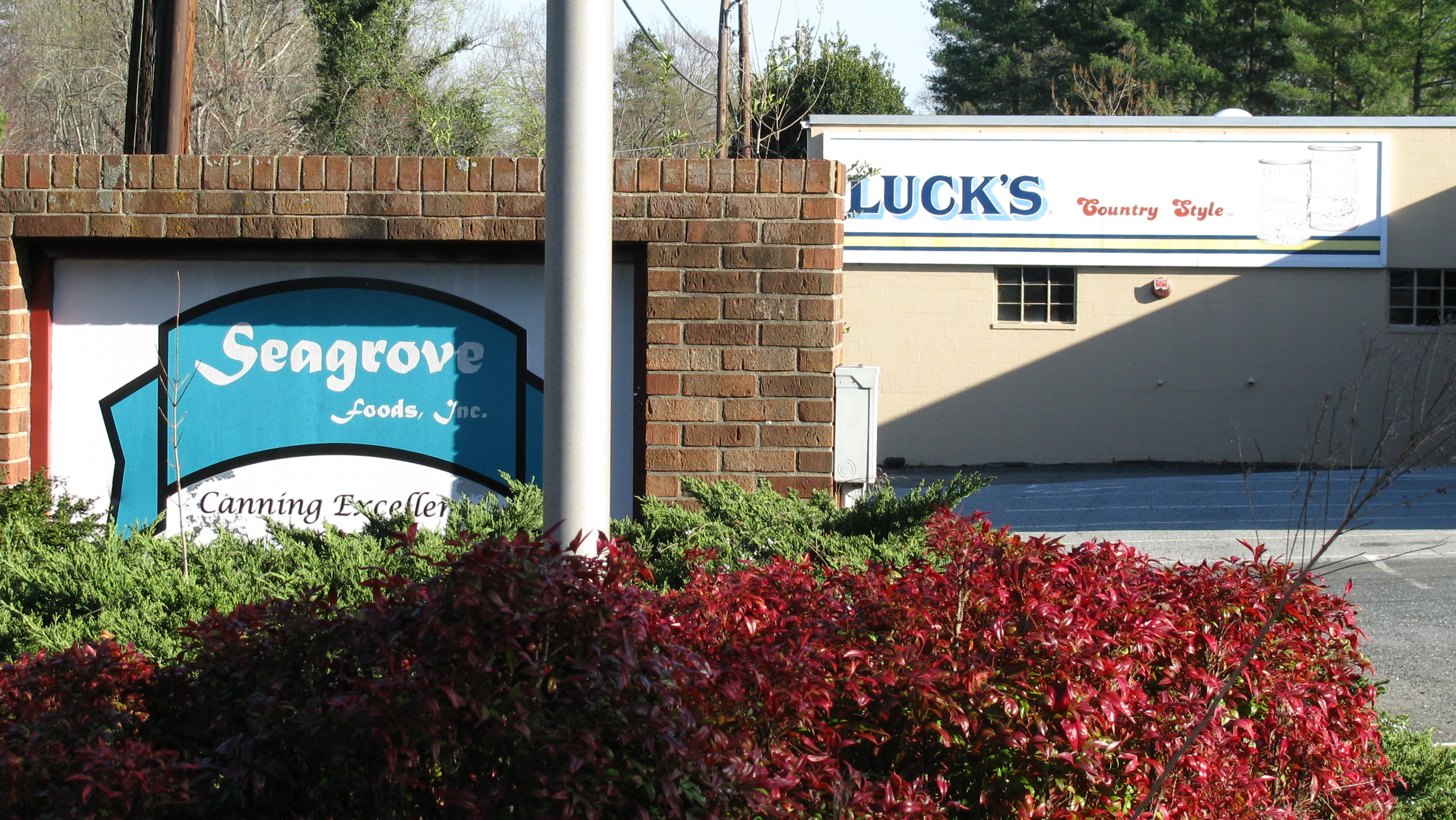
Luck's cannery in Seagrove

The original company headquarters and cannery is located at 798 State Highway 705 in Seagrove, North Carolina. For a period of time Luck's also operated a cannery in Aberdeen, North Carolina.

The Luck's cannery in Seagrove was closed by ConAgra in 2002. The location was reopened eight months later and operated by Seagrove Foods, Inc., a fully independent company.

Currently, some of the warehouse space is used for local community events.

== See also ==
- Seagrove, North Carolina
