= Whynot, North Carolina =

- Unincorporated community
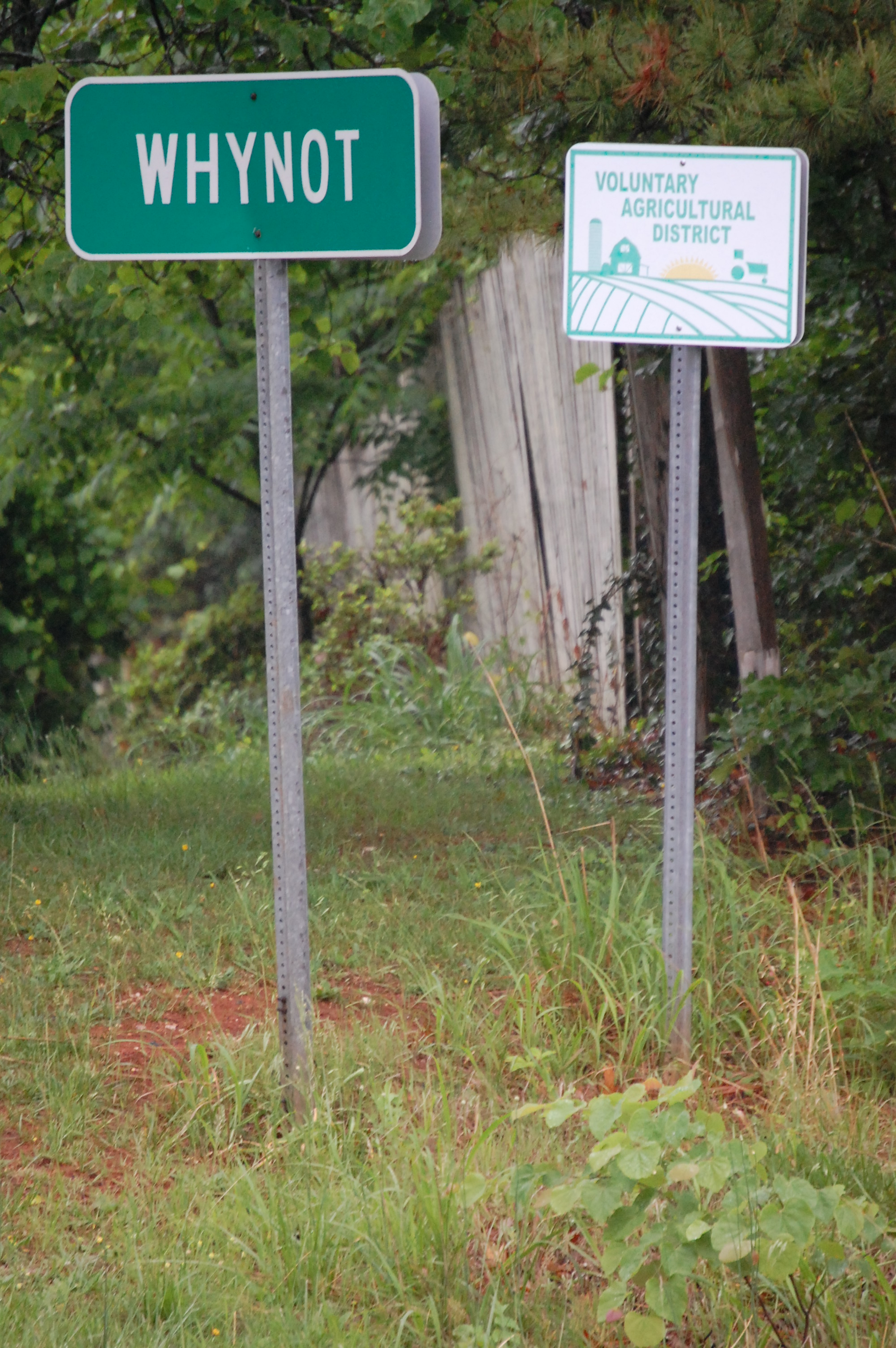
- Whynot sign

- Location of Whynot in North Carolina Whynot, North Carolina (the United States)
- Coordinates: 35°31′55.8″N 79°45′14.3″W
- Country: United States
- State: North Carolina
- County: Randolph
- Elevation: 604 ft (184 m)
- Time zone: UTC-5 (Eastern (EST))
  - Summer (DST): UTC-4 (EDT)
- Zip code: 27341
- Area code: 336
- GNIS feature ID: 1016647

Whynot is an unincorporated community in Randolph County, North Carolina, United States, and is included in the Piedmont Triad metropolitan region. Whynot is located on NC 705, also known as the "North Carolina Pottery Highway", one mile (1.6 km) southeast of Seagrove and seven miles (11 km) west of Jugtown Pottery, a historic pottery listed on the National Register of Historic Places. The North Carolina Pottery Highway contains over 100 potteries and galleries in a 15-square-mile (39 km^{2}) region surrounding Seagrove.

== History ==
Whynot was first settled in the 18th century by German and English people, along with the nearby communities of Erect, Hemp, Lonely, Steeds, and Sophia.

When asked why Whynot got its name, Whynot locals replied, "Why not?" According to locals, the name Whynot arose during a lengthy community debate when one man finally remarked: "Why not name the town Why Not and let's go home?" The community was originally spelled with two separate words, "Why Not".

The Why Not Academy and Business Institute, a combination public and private school, was located in the community from 1893 until it burned down in 1916. One elderly Whynot woman praised the community for its loyalty to their home: "The people in Whynot are proud".

Whynot has frequently been noted on lists of unusual place names.

== Arts and culture ==
Area residents first began making pottery in the 18th century. The area still contains several pottery shops including Dirtworks Pottery, Tom Gray Pottery, Dixieland Pottery, Marsh Pottery, Kovack Pottery, Michele Hastings & Jeff Brown Pottery, and Whynot Pottery.

== Gallery ==
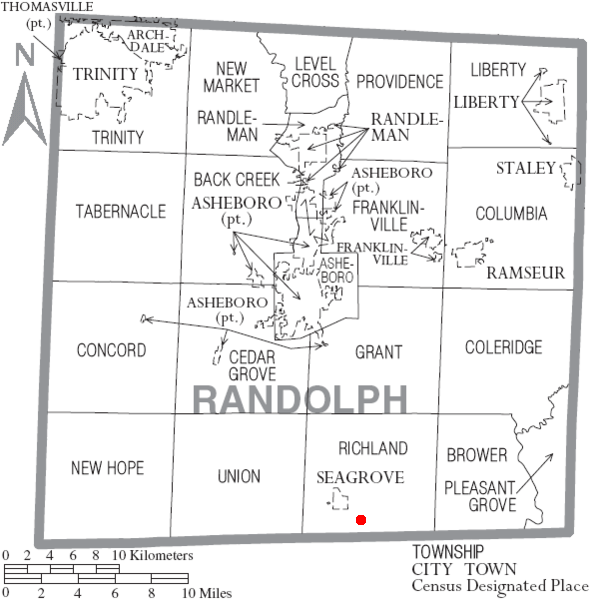
Location of Whynot on a map of Randolph County, North Carolina

Postmark from a Confederate soldier living in "Why Not". (note the original spelling of the community) The postmark is dated December 16, 1862.

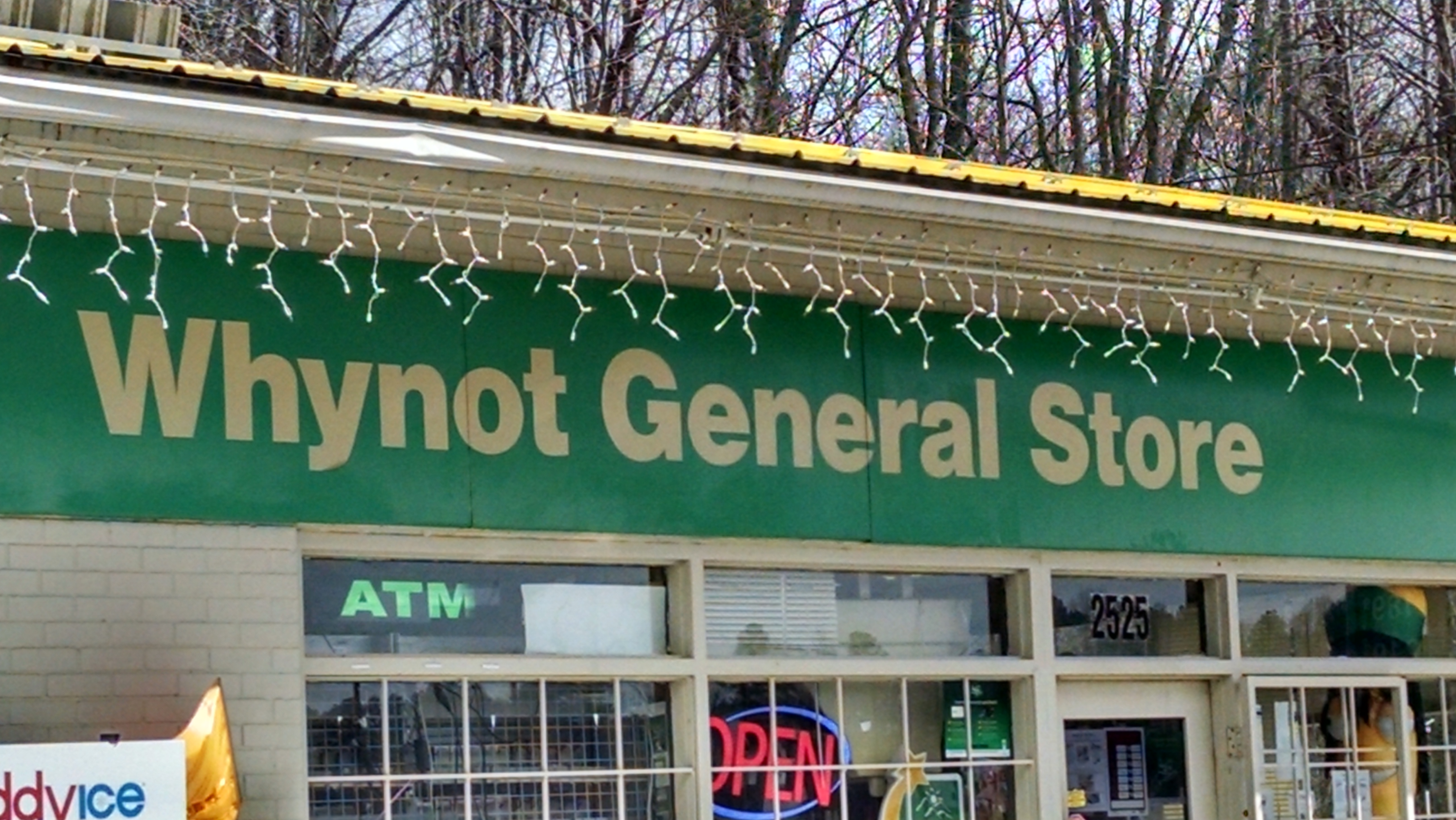
Whynot General Store

== See also ==
- List of unincorporated communities in North Carolina
