= Carl Hopgood =

British sculptor, set designer, and artist

- Born: 1972 (age 53–54); Cardiff, Wales
- Education: Goldsmiths, University of London
- Awards: 1st Class Honors Degree
- Patrons: Maddox Gallery
- Website: www.carlhopgood.com

Carl Hopgood (born 1972 in Cardiff, Wales) is a British sculptor, set designer, video and installation artist, and neon artist. He is best known for his works Digital Taxidermy, film sculptures, and his solo show Arrivals Departures at the Waddington Gallery and the Karsten Schubert Gallery in London.

== Early life and education ==
Hopgood attended Goldsmiths College in London, England, where he graduated in 1994 with a Bachelor of Fine Arts and First Class honors. Hopgood received guidance from Michael Craig-Martin while at Goldsmiths College and graduated along with Alessandra Raho, Angela Cruz, and Ceal Floyer of the Young British Artists group.

== Work ==
Hopgood has served as set designer for editorial and commercial clients in print and television, including Ellen von Unwerth, Nadine Coyle, Gwen Stefani, Nicola Roberts, Kate Moss, and Linda Evangelista. His editorial and commercial work has been published in Vogue Magazine, Elle Magazine, Marie Claire Magazine, GQ Magazine, Easy Living Magazine, D Magazine, Booklett Magazine, Nokia, Bally, Kurt Geiger, Sky HD TV, H&M, Target, and Channel 4. He has worked with photographers Hunter & Gatti, Elisabeth Hoff, Karen Collins, Alexi Lubomirski, Julian Broad and David Burton.

In 2011, he served as production designer on the television series Word on the Street. In 2016, his work Digital Taxidermy was featured on Project Runway All Stars.

Adrian Searle, art critic for The Independent, wrote, "Hopgood's work depends as much on the awkwardness of his medium as on the novelty of the spectacle."

== Exhibitions and collections ==
=== Solo exhibitions ===
Hopgood had his two debut solo exhibitions Arrivals, Departures at the Karsten Schubert Gallery in London and the Waddington Custot Gallery in Cork Street, London, (curated by Hester van Royen) in 1994. Studio d'Arte Contemporanea di Pino Casagrande in Rome organized a solo exhibition of Hopgood's work in 1997. He also had solo exhibitions at The Groucho Club, London in 2003, at White Cubicle, London (curated by Pablo León de la Barra) in 2007, at Grey Space, Sydney in 2008, at a pop up show at the Groucho Club Bedrooms, London (curated by Nicky Carter) in 2009, and at the Minnie Weisz Studio, London in 2011.

=== Group exhibitions ===
In 1997, Hopgood's first major group exhibition False Impressions was presented by the British School at Rome (curated by Alison Jacques). The exhibition also featured artists Lucy Gunning, Cerith Wyn Evans, Richard Patterson, Alessandra Raho, Kerry Stewart, and Catherine Yass. Art Monthly reviewed Hopgood's piece, stating:

'Finally in a room totally devoted to it is a statuesque plaster cast by Carl Hopgood. 'Sleeping Figure' is as white and cold as marble, the dignified "portrait" of a sleeping man, evocative of a classical sculpture. Yet, disconcertingly, it breathes through the life support machine of a 16mm film projection of a "living" color image animated by camera shake.'

His work has been featured in multiple group exhibitions, including the Goldsmiths Degree Show, London in 1994, the ARCO Art Fair, Madrid in 1995, Spacex Gallery, Exeter (curated by Alex Farquharson) in 1996, the Bracknell Gallery, Reading in 1996, the St. Martin's M.A. Show, London in 1997, Art Energie Art in Jeans, Florence in 1998, 3 Mills Studios, London in 1999, Barbican Arts Group Open Exhibition, London in 2004 and 2007, Frame Gallery Shaftesbury Avenue, London in 2006, The Groucho Club, London in 2008, 2009 and 2010, Daneyal Mahmood Gallery, New York in 2009, Forster Gallery, London in 2009, Lazarides Gallery, London in 2009, Tate Modern, Berlin in 2009 and 2011, Truman Brewery, London in 2011 and 2012, and OXO Tower, London in 2013.

In 2013, Hopgood's artwork was included in Platform Six, an exhibition and auction at The South Bank which offers insight into London-based LGBT artists, including Boy George. Platform Six patrons include Kate Moss, Naomi Campbell, Sir Elton John and Kylie Minogue.

=== Collections ===
Hopgood's work is part of the permanent art collections at the Groucho Club, London and Museo Jumex, Mexico.

== Art market ==
Hopgood's neon word piece Love Yourself sold at a charity auction hosted by Kenny Goss for MTV's Staying Alive Foundation at the Dallas Contemporary Museum. The auction raised over $2.7 million for the Goss-Michael Foundation and the Staying Alive Foundation.

== Filmography ==
=== Television ===
Year	Title	Role	Note(s)
2011	Word on the Street	Production Designer	
2016	Project Runway All Stars	Himself (Artist)	Episode: "State of the Art"
