= Jumex =

Mexican company of beverages

Grupo Jumex, S.A. de C.V

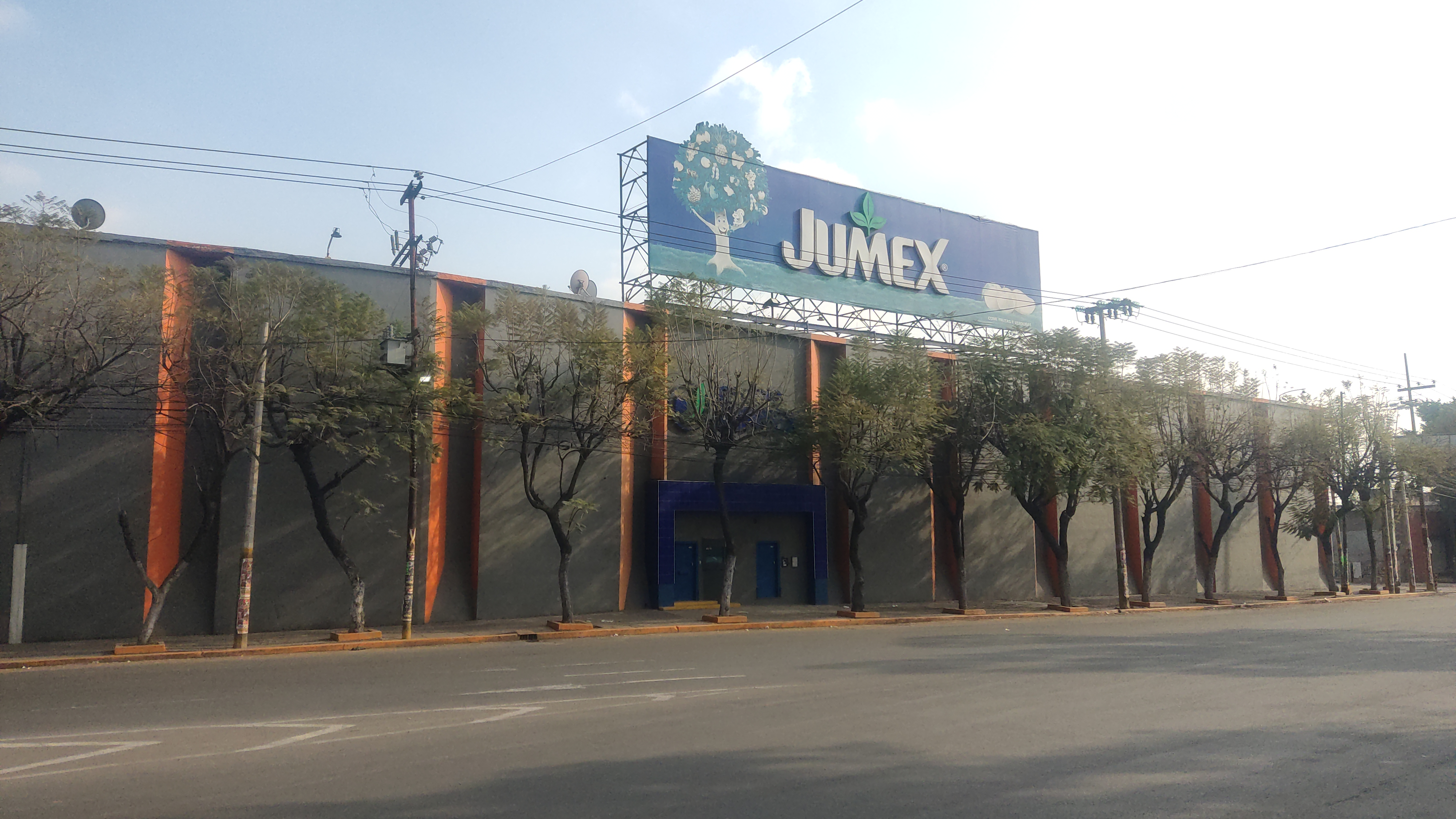
- Company type: Private
- Industry: Foods
- Founded: April 27, 1961; 65 years ago
- Headquarters: Ecatepec de Morelos, Mexico
- Key people: Eugenio López Alonso
- Products: Fruit juices, nectar, children's drinks, milk, energy drinks, and sports drinks
- Number of employees: 4047
- Website: www.jumex.com

The famous "little blue can"

Grupo Jumex, S.A. de C.V. ([ˈxumeks]), which is short for Jugos de México (Juices of Mexico), is a brand of juice and nectar from Mexico. The Jumex brand is also popular among Hispanic consumers in the United States. Currently, the Jumex Group (which manufactures Jumex) offers lines of fresh and preserved fruit juices, nectar, children's drinks, milk, smoothies, energy drinks, and sports drinks in Mexico.

Its headquarters are in Ecatepec de Morelos, State of Mexico, in the Mexico City area.

== History ==
The origins of Jumex lie with Empacadora de Frutas y Jugos, S.A. (Fruit and Juice Packing Industry, Inc.) and its Frugo brand, which was founded on April 27, 1961. Grupo Jumex began with the vision of Don Eugenio López Rodea, who managed to bottle the first apple nectar in a can of 350-milliliter on June 6, 1961. With the support of his family and community, Jumex was born with only 20 workers and now it has over 4000 workers. The first flavors were apricot, apple, guava, mango, pear, plum and tamarind; today several additional flavors and blends are offered under its brands. The actual Jumex brand and its "little blue can" was introduced in 1964. The current company associated with Jumex and other popular beverage brands is the Jumex Group, which consists of Frugosa, Botemex, Jugomex, Alijumex, Vilore Services Corp., Vilore Services, and Vilore Foods, Inc. (U.S.) Jumex is associated with the Mexican foods company La Costeña.

In 2013, Jumex acquired Kern's.

== See also ==
- Colección Jumex
