= Original Owens Pottery =

Oldest continuously operating pottery in North Carolina

("Original") Owens Pottery
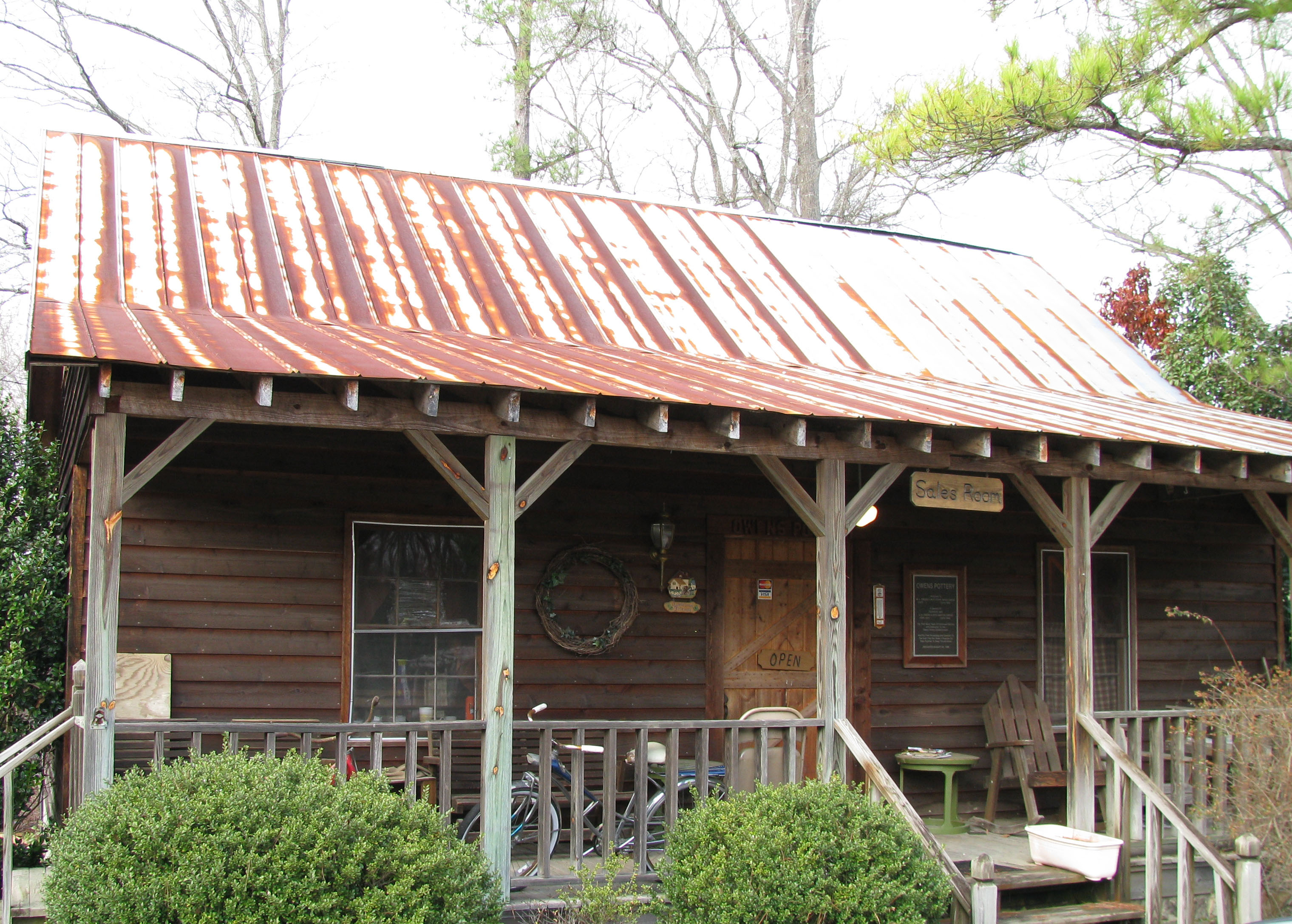
- Industry: home furnishing
- Founded: 1895
- Founders: J. H. Owens
- Headquarters: Near Seagrove, North Carolina
- Website: www.owenspottery1895.com

Original Owens Pottery (also known as Owens Pottery of North Carolina) is the oldest continuously operating pottery in North Carolina, located near Seagrove in Randolph County. Founded in 1895 by James H. Owen, the pottery has remained in continuous family operation for over 130 years, across five generations of the Owen/Owens family. It is best known for its hand-thrown stoneware and a distinctive high-fired red glaze. The pottery is currently owned and operated by Boyd Owens and his sister Nancy Owens Brewer. In 2009, the North Carolina Pottery Center held a major exhibition on the family's work titled "175 Years of Pottery by the Owen/Owens Families".

== History ==
=== Founding: James H. Owen (1866–1923) ===
Original Owens Pottery was founded in 1895 by James Henry Owen (known as "Jim"), who was born in 1866, the son of Benjamin Franklin Owen. The Owen family had been involved in pottery-making in the Seagrove area since at least the early nineteenth century. J.H. Owen learned pottery from Paschal Marable of Randolph County, and upon returning to Moore County taught the craft to members of his own family. He opened a shop on the land in the Westmoore community that would become the site of Original Owens Pottery.

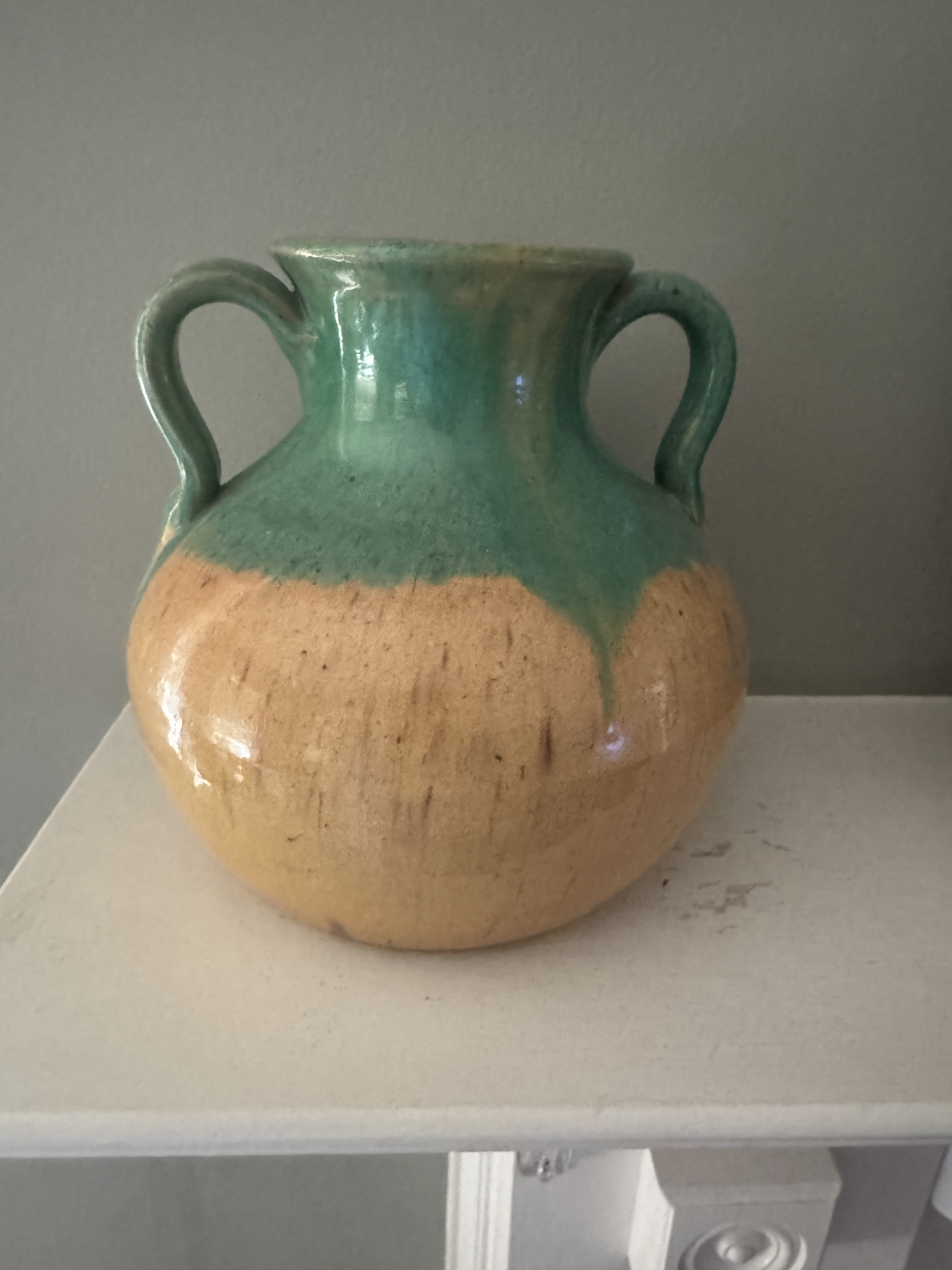
Vase made by JH Owen, 1915

J.H. Owen was among the first potters to work with arts advocates Jacques and Juliana Busbee, who came to the Seagrove area in the early twentieth century seeking traditional Southern folk pottery. He helped establish the early Jugtown pottery style, developing processes for turning and firing that would influence potters across the region. Owen experimented with adding decorative features to familiar utilitarian forms such as jugs and churns, and developed a distinctive "floor vase" form. His wife, Martha Jane Scott Owen (1875–1953), contributed to the family business by molding small clay figures for sale, and her family sold the Busbees the land that became Jugtown Pottery.

J.H. Owen died in 1923, the same year the Busbees formally opened Jugtown Pottery.

=== M.L. Owens (1917–2002) ===
James H. Owen's son, Melvin L. Owens — known throughout the Seagrove community as M.L. Owens — became the central figure in the pottery's development over the middle decades of the twentieth century. Born in 1917, M.L. learned the craft at his father's side and eventually took over the family pottery operation, expanding both its scale and its reputation.

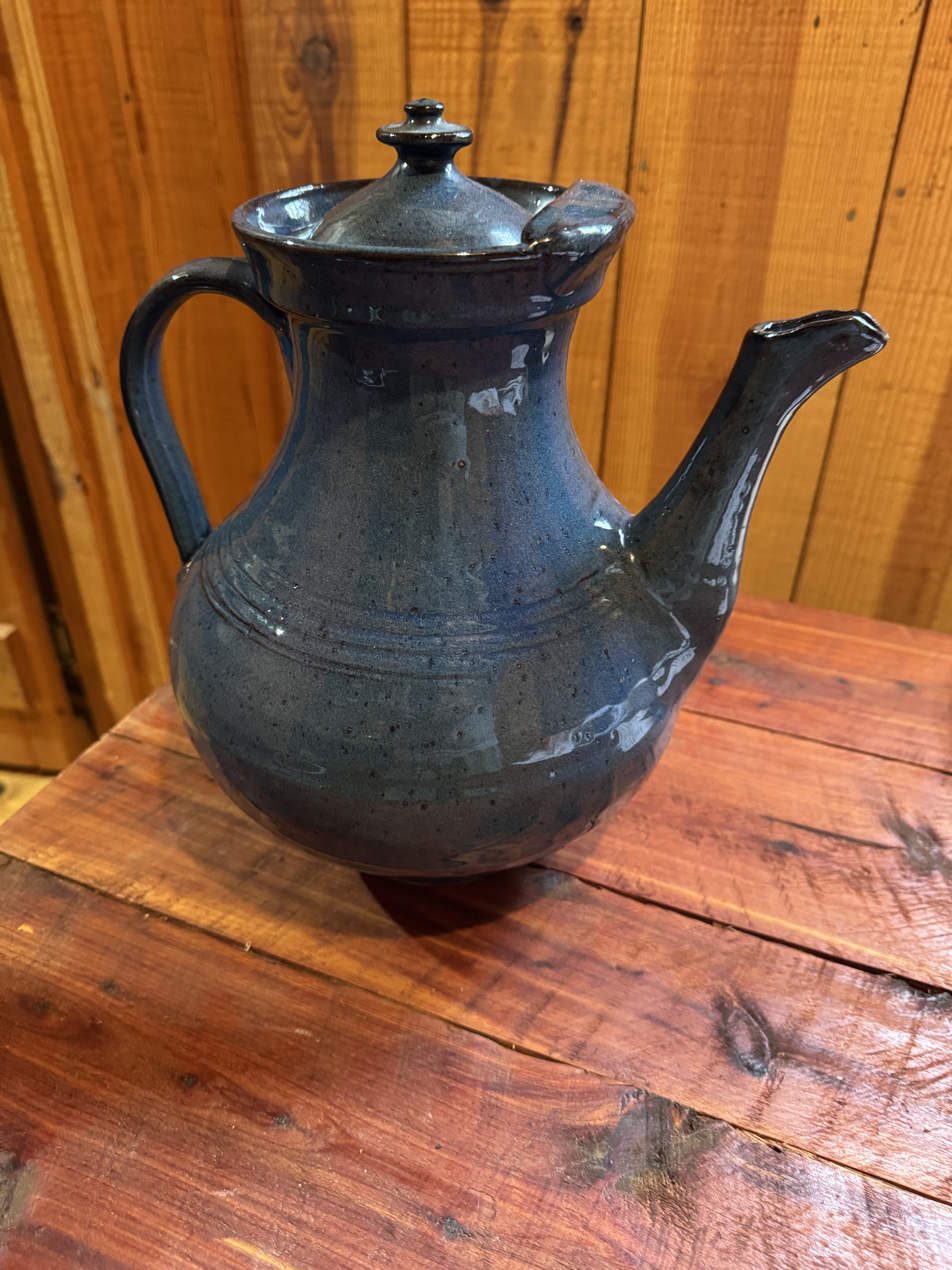
Large blue pottery teapot by ML Owens in Seagrove, NC

M.L. Owens is widely credited with developing the pottery's signature Owens Red glaze — a vivid, high-fired scarlet glaze that became the pottery's most recognizable product and one of the most celebrated glazes in the Seagrove tradition. He also spent decades prospecting for native clay, locating clay deposits across Randolph, Moore, and Lee counties as well as in South Carolina — caches that the pottery continues to draw from today. M.L. taught all eight of his children the craft; six of them became potters, spreading the family tradition from Seagrove to Jugtown and the Blue Ridge Mountains.

M.L. Owens died in 2002. His obituary appeared in the Greensboro News & Record.

=== Current operations ===
M.L. Owens turned the pottery over to his son Boyd Owens (born 1948) in 1975. Boyd has continued to operate Original Owens Pottery as a working pottery — not a museum, but a shop where clay is thrown daily. He works primarily in plates, platters, and dinnerware. His sister Nancy Owens Brewer (born 1953) has worked alongside him throughout and is recognized as one of the most prolific potters in the Seagrove area, producing thousands of pieces a year by hand including the pottery's signature painted folk-art series.

Unlike most contemporary potters who work with commercially prepared clay, Boyd Owens continues to dig native clay from sites identified by his father — traveling to locations across Randolph, Moore, and Lee counties to haul red clay from about two feet below the topsoil. The clay is dried, then pulverized in a hammermill powered by an engine from an old Farmall tractor — a process Boyd has noted is necessary because dust from clay processing destroys conventional motors. The pottery's grinder has been in continuous use since 1930. Dinnerware is fired at approximately 2,250 degrees Fahrenheit, and the kiln can accommodate up to 700 pieces per firing.

== The Owens family and Jugtown Pottery ==
Several of M.L. Owens's children went on to prominent careers at Jugtown Pottery, the celebrated Seagrove pottery that became internationally known for its distinctive glazes and forms.

Vernon Owens (born 1941), M.L.'s son, became principal potter at Jugtown in 1960, taking on a role previously held by the legendary Ben Owen. After the pottery's owner John Maré died in 1962, Vernon and his brother Bobby operated it together. Vernon purchased Jugtown outright in 1983 and has operated it with his wife, Pam Lorrette Owens, and their children Travis and Bayle. In 1996, Vernon Owens was awarded the National Heritage Fellowship by the National Endowment for the Arts — the United States government's highest honor in the folk and traditional arts.

Bobby Owens (born 1939), M.L.'s son, worked alongside Vernon at Jugtown for decades, taking on essential operational roles including clay processing, kiln loading and firing, and maintenance.

Lula Belle Owens Bolick (born 1943), M.L.'s daughter, married Glenn Bolick in 1962 and established Bolick Pottery between Lenoir and Blowing Rock, extending the Owens pottery tradition into the Blue Ridge Mountains. She received the Brown-Hudson Folklore Award from the North Carolina Folklore Society; she and Glenn both received the North Carolina Heritage Award.

== Legacy and recognition ==
In January 2009, the North Carolina Pottery Center in Seagrove opened a landmark exhibition titled "175 Years of Pottery by the Owen/Owens Families," drawing approximately 200 collectors, potters, and community members to the opening. The exhibition included a color catalog featuring more than 100 pieces and biographical profiles of more than 30 potters across the extended family. The exhibition was curated by Charlotte Brown, author of The Remarkable Potters of Seagrove.

Original Owens Pottery is located at 3728 Busbee Road, Seagrove, NC 27341, on the NC Pottery Highway.

== Sources ==
- "Pottery Makers of the Owen and Owens Families". North Carolina Pottery Center. January 25, 2009.
- Womick, Chip (August 2010). "Red Clay Culture". Our State Magazine.
- Patterson, Hadassah (August 2018). "Pottery Heaven: Take a Trip to Seagrove". WRAL-TV.
- "Vernon Owens — 1996 NEA National Heritage Fellow". National Endowment for the Arts. 1996.
