= Eugenio López Alonso =

Mexican businessman

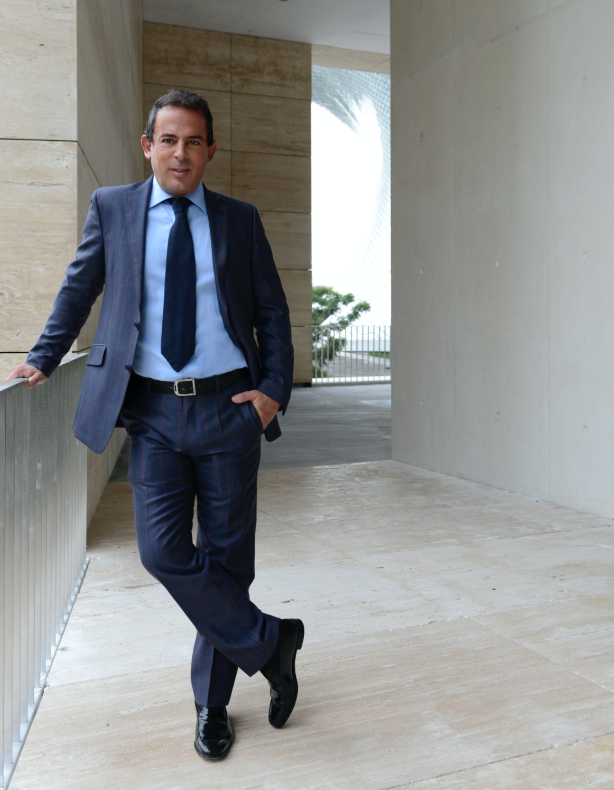
Eugenio López Alonso

Eugenio López Alonso is the sole heir to the Grupo Jumex fruit juice fortune, one of Mexico's most successful national enterprises, the president of Fundación Jumex Arte Contemporáneo, and a significant contemporary art collector.

He has worked in the realm of contemporary art collecting in Mexico since the late 1990s, focusing on the promotion of contemporary art practice and on fostering its development. In 1994, he cofounded Chac Mool Gallery in Los Angeles with art adviser Esthella Provas. In 2001, he created Fundación Jumex, a not-for-profit institution that receives support from Grupo Jumex, a company founded by his father, Eugenio López Rodea. His goal was to establish a permanent art collection for the public. The creation of Museo Jumex in 2013 has further established López's influence in the international cultural landscape.

His work has been recognized through his continual support of different museums in Mexico in their programming of educational activities, publications related to the visual arts, and through the grants and scholarships that Fundación Jumex awards every year to curators and artists for postgraduate studies abroad.

López is currently a member of the board of trustees of other institutions in Mexico like Museo Tamayo Arte Contemporáneo, Museo de Arte Moderno and Patronato de Arte Contemporáneo (PAC). In the US, López is on the board of trustees of the New Museum of Contemporary Art in New York and of Museum of Contemporary Art, Los Angeles (MOCA). It is thanks to his interest in contemporary Latin American art that the MOCA established the JUMEX FUND. He has also supported the making of exhibitions and publications at Metropolitan Museum of Art and Museum of Modern Art in New York, The Moore Space, Miami, and Los Angeles County Museum of Art (LACMA) and the Hammer Museum in Los Angeles.

== Awards ==
He has received various awards and acknowledgments during his career as a collector, patron of the arts and philanthropist:

- 2003 - Tribute from the New Museum of Contemporary Art, New York
- 2005 - International Collector's Award, Feria de Arte Internacional ARCO, Madrid
- 2006 - Collector of the Year Award, Fundación Olga y Rufino Tamayo, Mexico City
- 2007 - Sorolla Medal, The Hispanic Society of America, New York
- 2008 - International Patron of the Arts Award, Montblanc Cultural Foundation, Mexico City
- Museo Universitario de Arte Contemporáneo (MUAC, UNAM) named one of its galleries after him to acknowledge his funding of the building's construction.
- 2011 - Premio Visionario, Empresa Televisa & Jalisco State Government
- 2014 - My Hero award from the Aid for Aids organization for his contribution to the fight against this illness
- 2016 - International Philanthropy Award, UN Women for Peace Association, New York
- 2023 - Ibero-American Patronage Award granted by the Callia Foundation.

== Fundación Jumex ==
Fundación Jumex Arte Contemporáneo was formally established on March 3, 2001 to foster the production and discussion of contemporary art. It accomplishes this through the Colección Jumex, its art collection, and Museo Jumex, a site for the exhibition and activation of contemporary art. Fundación Jumex furthers its mission through complementary programs: development, directed at supporting contemporary art practice and independent projects; and education, committed to helping visitors understand and appreciate contemporary art.

== Colección Jumex ==
Colección Jumex, considered one of the most important art collections in Latin America, includes works by Mexican and international artists like Andy Warhol, Alexander Calder, Roni Horn, Louise Bourgeois, Cy Twombly, Gabriel Orozco, Damián Ortega, Minerva Cuevas, Julieta Aranda, Abraham Cruzvillegas, John Baldessari, Urs Fischer, Jeff Koons, Marcel Duchamp, Gego, and Francis Alÿs among many others.

== Museo Jumex ==
Museo Jumex opened in November 2013 as an institution devoted to contemporary art. It is located in Mexico City in the Polanco area. Through its exhibitions and public programs, it aspires to become a relevant institution in the field of art by producing and co-producing exhibitions and research, as well as familiarizing the audiences with the concepts and contexts of contemporary art.

Museo Jumex was the first building in Latin America designed by the Pritzker Architecture Prize-winning British architect David Chipperfield. It is considered the preeminent art collection of Latin America.
