= North Moore High School =

American public school in North Carolina

Location
- 1504 North Moore Rd; Robbins, North Carolina 27325; United States; 35°28′06″N 79°33′13″W

Information
- Type: Public
- Established: 1965 (61 years ago)
- CEEB code: 343325
- Principal: Joseph Patterson (Interim)
- Teaching staff: 36.61 (FTE)
- Enrollment: 613 (2023-2024)
- Student to teacher ratio: 16.74
- Colors: Forest green and Old gold
- Mascot: Mustang
- Website: nmhs.ncmcs.org

North Moore High School is a High School in Robbins, North Carolina, United States. The first consolidated high school in Moore County, it opened in 1965.

== History ==
The school was created through the consolidation of Elise High School, Westmoore High School, and High Falls High School. The cost of building the school was about $1.5 million dollars in 1964–65.

In 2006 North Moore High School was named one of the best schools in the US. The Class of 2008 was the biggest graduating class in the school's history.

== Description ==
There are 38 classroom teachers on staff, two vice principals, one principal, one media specialist, two counsellors and 22 support staff. The current enrollment is around 575. There are around 16% Hispanic students and 11% African-American students in the student body. There was around $1.3 million awarded in scholarships to members of the class of 2009. Spanish and French are offered as foreign languages, along with various online languages. The school maintains a 95.46% average daily attendance rate among students. North Moore High also has smart boards in every classroom.

North Moore serves as an evacuation site in the event of emergencies for the upper portion of Moore County.

== Notable alumni ==
- Charles E. Brady, former Blue Angel and NASA Astronaut
- John Edwards, former U.S. Senator and Democratic nominee for Vice President in 2004
- Cam Thomas, NFL defensive tackle
