= Robbins, North Carolina =

- Town
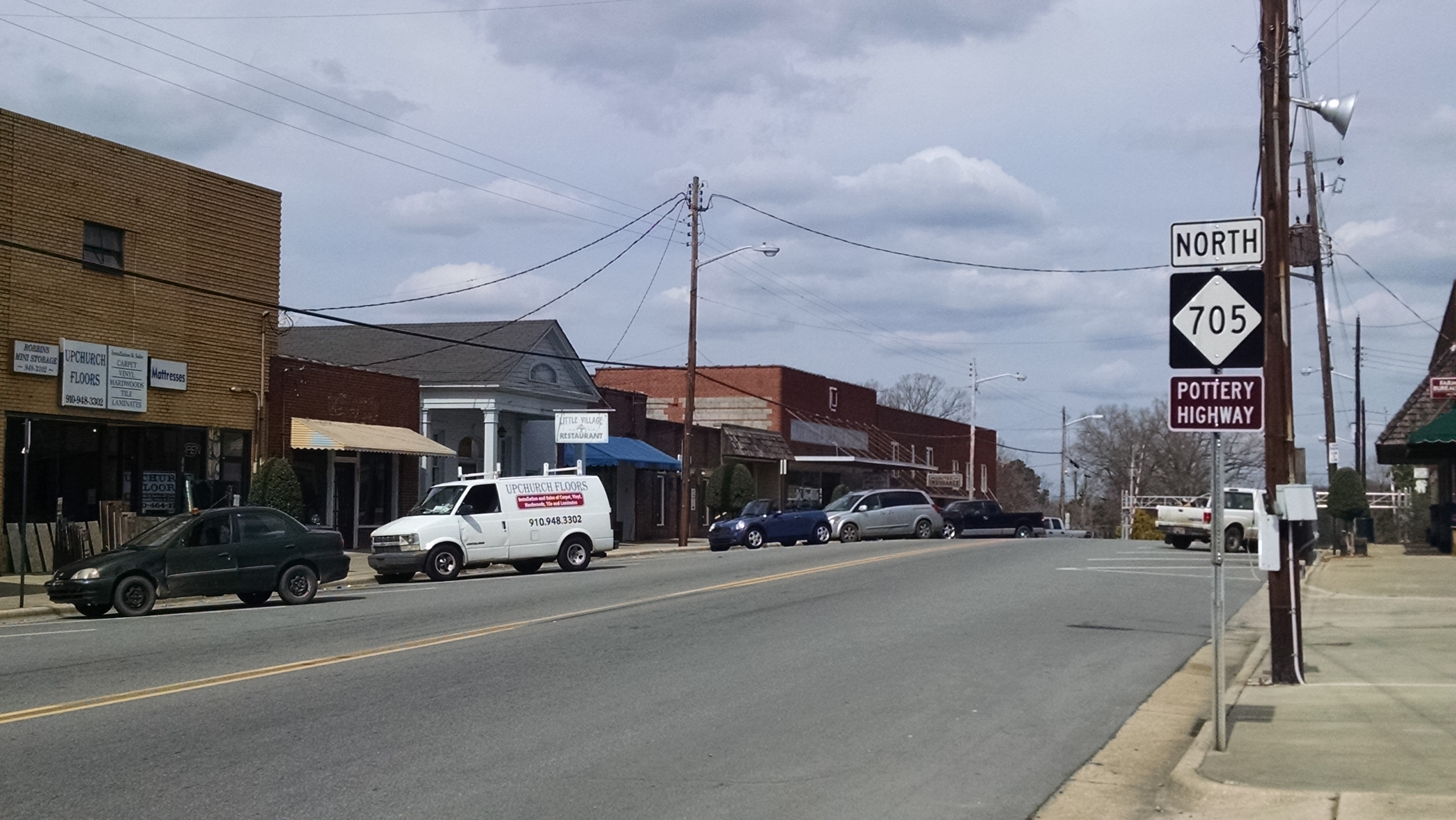
- Central business district of Robbins

- Location in Moore County and the state of North Carolina
- Coordinates: 35°25′40″N 79°34′59″W
- Country: United States
- State: North Carolina
- County: Moore
- Incorporated: 1935
- Named for: Karl Robbins

Government
  - Mayor: Cameron Dockery

Area
  - Total: 1.59 sq mi (4.12 km^{2})
  - Land: 1.59 sq mi (4.12 km^{2})
  - Water: 0 sq mi (0.00 km^{2})
- Elevation: 463 ft (141 m)

Population (2020)
  - Total: 1,168
  - Density: 733.7/sq mi (283.28/km^{2})
- Time zone: UTC-5 (Eastern (EST))
  - Summer (DST): UTC-4 (EDT)
- ZIP Code: 27325
- Area codes: 910, 472
- FIPS code: 37-57000
- GNIS feature ID: 2404630
- Website: www.townofrobbins.com

Robbins is a town in Moore County, North Carolina, United States. The population was 1,168 at the 2020 census.

== History ==
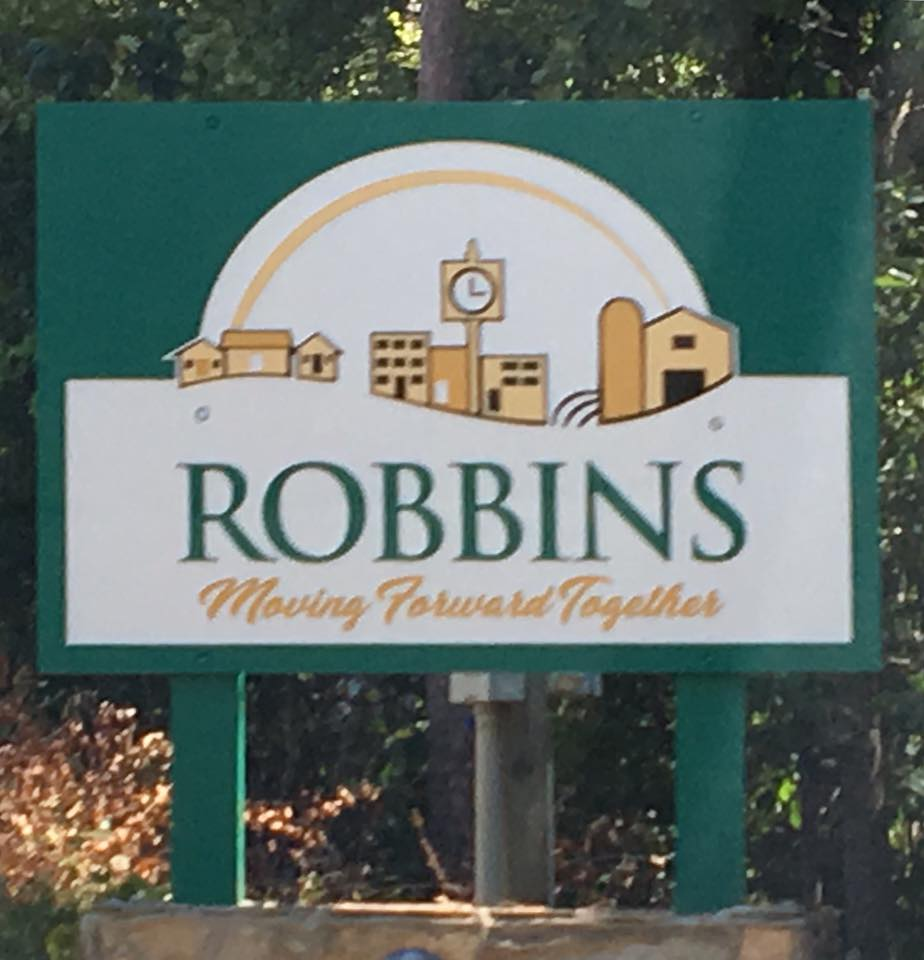
Robbins welcome sign

The town now known as Robbins began in 1795 when gunsmith Alexander Kennedy and his family left Philadelphia to settle along Bear Creek. Kennedy set up a factory, which produced long rifles for American soldiers, near the site of the present-day Robbins water plant. The Kennedy Rifle Works continued in operation until 1838, and the place became known as Mechanics Hill.

In 1891, the Durham and Charlotte Railroad connected Gulf in Chatham County to Troy in Montgomery County. The railroad reached Mechanics Hill around 1899. Railroad construction added many jobs and greatly increased the number of settlers. The railroad not only created its own jobs, it generated commerce by providing a ready means of transportation for turpentine, talc, pottery, lumber, agricultural products, and passengers. John B. Lennig (frequently misspelled as Lenning) was president and owner of the company. Lennig's tenure with the company was off-and-on for about 12 years. During that time, town lots and streets were designed. A map was registered at the Moore County Register of Deeds Office on March 24, 1900, and the town was named Elise in honor of Lennig's daughter.

In 1896, the John L. Frye Company, a producer of lumber for the rail and pallet industries, was established. Railroads across the US are supported by cross ties made in Robbins. John Lennig Frye, a past mayor, was named after John B. Lennig, the railroad owner.

Education was a major concern for the citizens of Elise and the surrounding communities. Some local businessmen and Lennig met many times to discuss these concerns. These meetings resulted in the founding of Elise Academy in 1904. The academy had a very proud standing and children from the town, and from other states and countries, made up the first class. Elise Academy operated until 1940, when it was sold to the Moore County Board of Education. In 1940, Kennedy Funeral Home bought the Arrowhead Dormitory to use as the primary funeral location for the town. It is still used for that purpose today in the center of town.

In 1890, the inventor Thomas Edison visited the town to take option on gold mining interests in the Carter's Mill area. Between 1923 and 1924, generators were installed at Carter's Mill, along Bear Creek, adjacent to Elise, and the first power was supplied to this area. In 1924 and 1925, William Cowgill built the first textile plant here, operating it as Moore Mills Textiles Plant. Three different companies operated that mill until September 1930, when Karl Robbins (1892-1960), a Russian-American manufacturer and philanthropist, purchased the mill and renamed it Pinehurst Silk Mills.

In 1935, the town's name was changed again. The name was changed to "Hemp", to avoid confusion between Elise and another town in North Carolina that had a similar name. For a while, the train depot had a sign for Elise on the track side and Hemp over the mail room side.

Karl Robbins brought great prominence to Hemp. He was responsible for a modern water treatment plant and a wastewater disposal system being completed in 1937. He also provided for recreational facilities, dial telephone service, a new firetruck, and a baseball park. Robbins started a non-profit, Pinelands, and gave or loaned the first $400,000 for the Research Triangle Park to be started just outside of Raleigh at the request of Governor Luther Hodges, who was a close friend of Mayor W.P. Saunders.

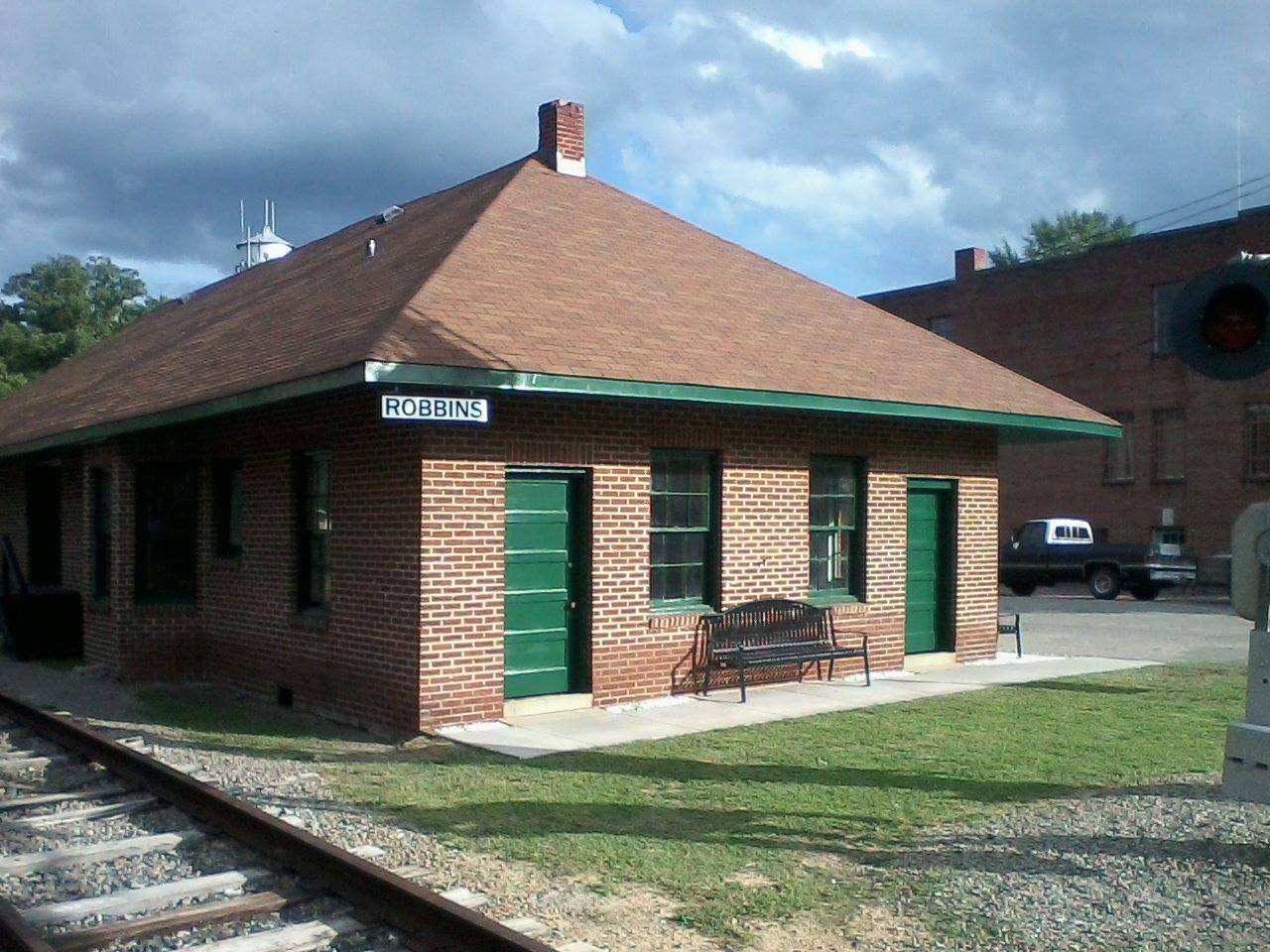
Historic Robbins Depot

In honor of Karl Robbins, the citizens of Hemp changed the name of the town to Robbins. The name of the town officially became Robbins in 1943, by act of the North Carolina General Assembly.

Later industries included a poultry processing plant, a mobile home manufacturing plant, and several textile mills. Ithaca Industries was a textile manufacturer that produced women's hosiery. At the height of its operation, the plant employed 1,100 people.

Robbins, like other rural towns in the South, suffered a loss to its manufacturing base that escalated during the 1990s. According to the Employment Security Commission, Robbins has lost 1,447 jobs since 1990. With the loss of jobs and manufacturing, the town lost a large portion of its water and sewer customers.

== Geography ==
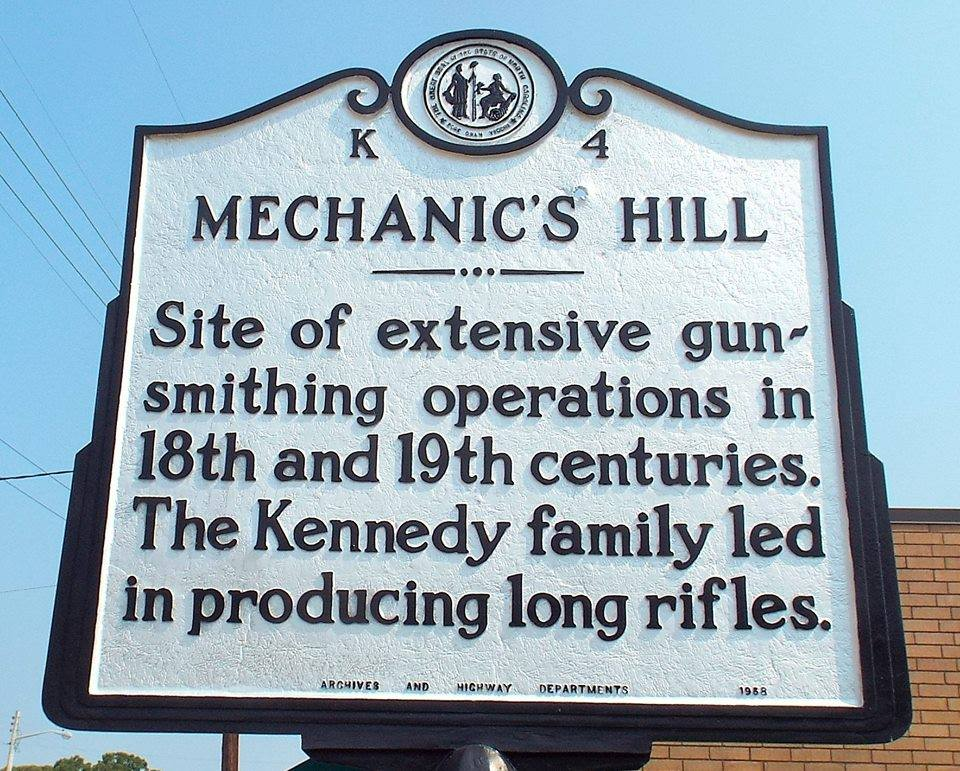
Mechanics Hill Historical Marker

Robbins is in northwestern Moore County on North Carolina Highway 705, the Pottery Highway. Seagrove is 13 miles (21 km) to the northwest via NC 705, and Carthage is 12 miles (19 km) to the southeast via highways 705 and 24/27.

According to the U.S. Census Bureau, the town of Robbins has a total area of 1.6 square miles (4.1 km^{2}), all of it recorded as land. Bear Creek, which forms the northwest boundary of the town, is a northeast-flowing tributary of the Deep River and part of the Cape Fear River watershed.

== Demographics ==
Historical population
Census	Pop.	Note	%±
1940	972		—
1950	1,158		19.1%
1960	1,294		11.7%
1970	1,059		−18.2%
1980	1,256		18.6%
1990	970		−22.8%
2000	1,195		23.2%
2010	1,097		−8.2%
2020	1,168		6.5%
2022 (est.)	1,227	▲	5.1%
U.S. Decennial Census

=== 2020 census ===
Robbins racial composition
Race	Number	Percentage
White (non-Hispanic)	475	40.67%
Black or African American (non-Hispanic)	50	4.28%
Native American	1	0.09%
Asian	12	1.03%
Other/Mixed	41	3.51%
Hispanic or Latino	589	50.43%

As of the 2020 United States census, there were 1,168 people, 526 households, and 332 families residing in the town.

=== 2000 census ===
As of the census of 2000, there were 1,195 people, 423 households, and 286 families residing in the city. The population density was 935.1 inhabitants per square mile (361.0/km^{2}). There were 471 housing units at an average density of 368.6 per square mile (142.3/km^{2}). The racial makeup of the city was 63.60% White, 2.34% African American, 0.33% Native American, 0.17% Asian, 0.42% Pacific Islander, 32.30% from other races, and 0.84% from two or more races. Hispanic or Latino of any race were 48.37% of the population.

There were 423 households, out of which 33.8% had children under the age of 18 living with them, 50.1% were married couples living together, 12.1% had a female householder with no husband present, and 32.2% were non-families. 29.1% of all households were made up of individuals, and 16.3% had someone living alone who was 65 years of age or older. The average household size was 2.81 and the average family size was 3.45.

In the city, the population was spread out, with 28.5% under the age of 18, 12.1% from 18 to 24, 28.7% from 25 to 44, 16.2% from 45 to 64, and 14.5% who were 65 years of age or older. The median age was 31 years. For every 100 females, there were 102.2 males. For every 100 females age 18 and over, there were 95.7 males.

The median income for a household in the city was $28,828, and the median income for a family was $33,523. Males had a median income of $21,346 versus $17,391 for females. The per capita income for the city was $14,468. About 18.4% of families and 22.0% of the population were below the poverty line, including 31.1% of those under age 18 and 10.7% of those age 65 or over.

== Notable people ==
- Charles E. Brady Jr. (1951–2006), astronaut, flew on space shuttle STS-78 in 1996 and logged over 405 hours in space.
- John Edwards (born 1953), American politician, former US senator, two-time presidential candidate, 2004 vice-presidential running mate of John Kerry, grew up in Robbins (he was born in Seneca, South Carolina).
- Karl Robbins (1892–1960), namesake of the town, owned the textile mill that later became Milliken and donated generously to the town, establishing the water plant and water/wastewater infrastructure. He served as chairman of the Research Triangle Committee during its planning stages and donated over 4,000 acres (16 km^{2}) to the state for the site of the research park. He founded a medical school at Yeshiva University in New York City and was a founder of the Federation of Jewish Philanthropies of New York and a patron of the New York University–Bellevue Medical Center. In 1951 he established the Karl Robbins Scholarship Fund at the Massachusetts Institute of Technology to further textile technology.
- Cam Thomas (born 1986), NFL football player for the Kansas City Chiefs. He played for the Pittsburgh Steelers for two seasons after becoming a free agent from the San Diego Chargers. Originally drafted in the fifth round of the 2010 NFL Draft by the San Diego Chargers. Played high school football at North Moore High School, and college football at the University of North Carolina.
