= Eagle Springs, North Carolina =

Unincorporated community in North Carolina, US

Coordinates: 35°17′30″N 79°39′10″W

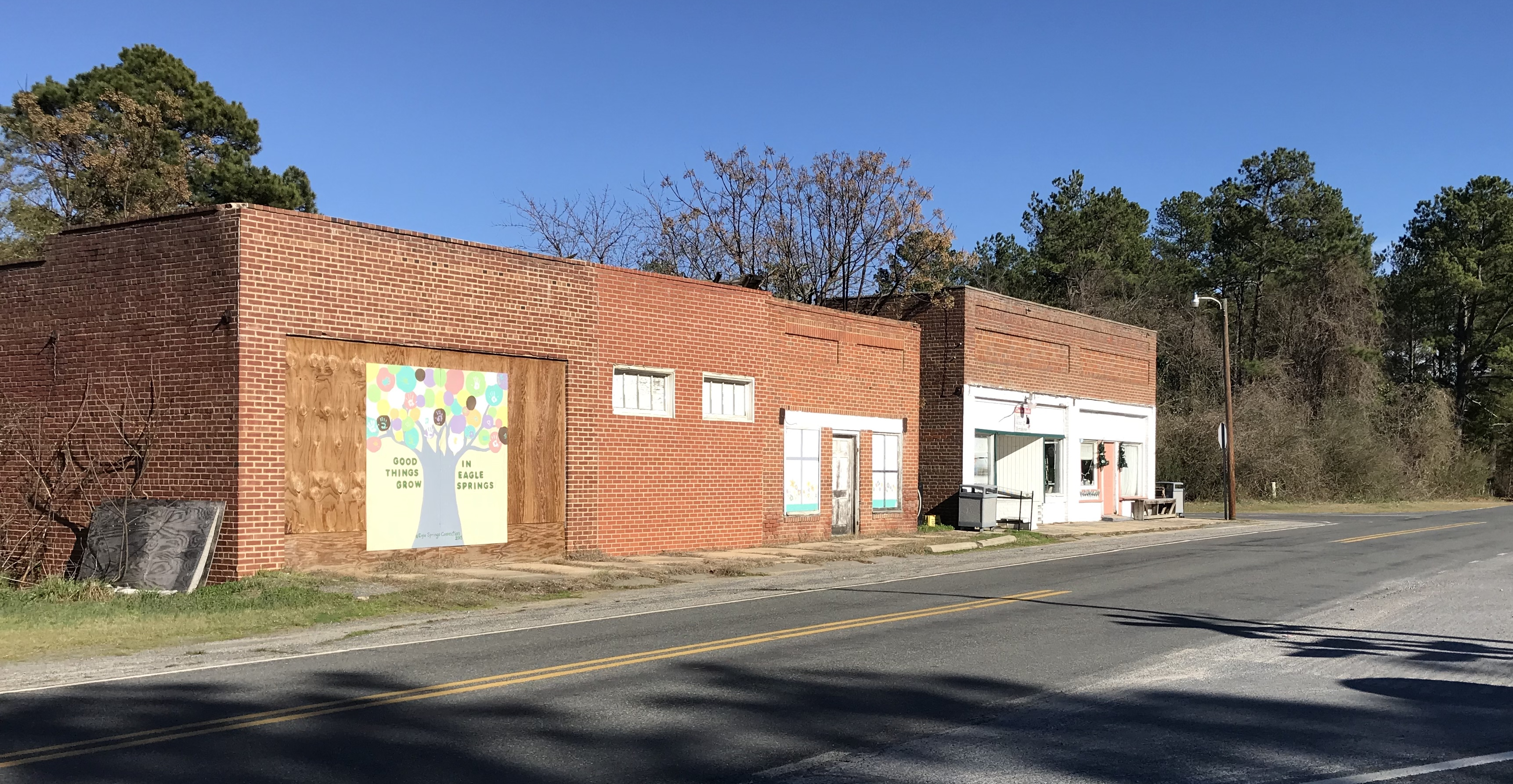
Eagle Springs, North Carolina

Eagle Springs is an unincorporated community in Moore County, North Carolina, United States, situated near the southern terminus of North Carolina Highway 705, on North Carolina Highway 211, west of Elberta, the southern terminus of North Carolina Highway 705. It lies at an elevation of 673 feet (205 m). The ZIP Code for Eagle Springs is 27242.

Eagle Springs was settled in the latter portion of the 19th century along an elevated strip of land near the headwaters of McLendon's Creek and Drowning Creek.

The North Carolina Department of Juvenile Justice and Delinquency Prevention previously operated the Samarkand Youth Development Center (YDC), a correctional facility for delinquent girls, in the area. The 60-acre (24 ha) complex first opened in 1918 and did not have a fence.
