= Seagrove, North Carolina =

- Town
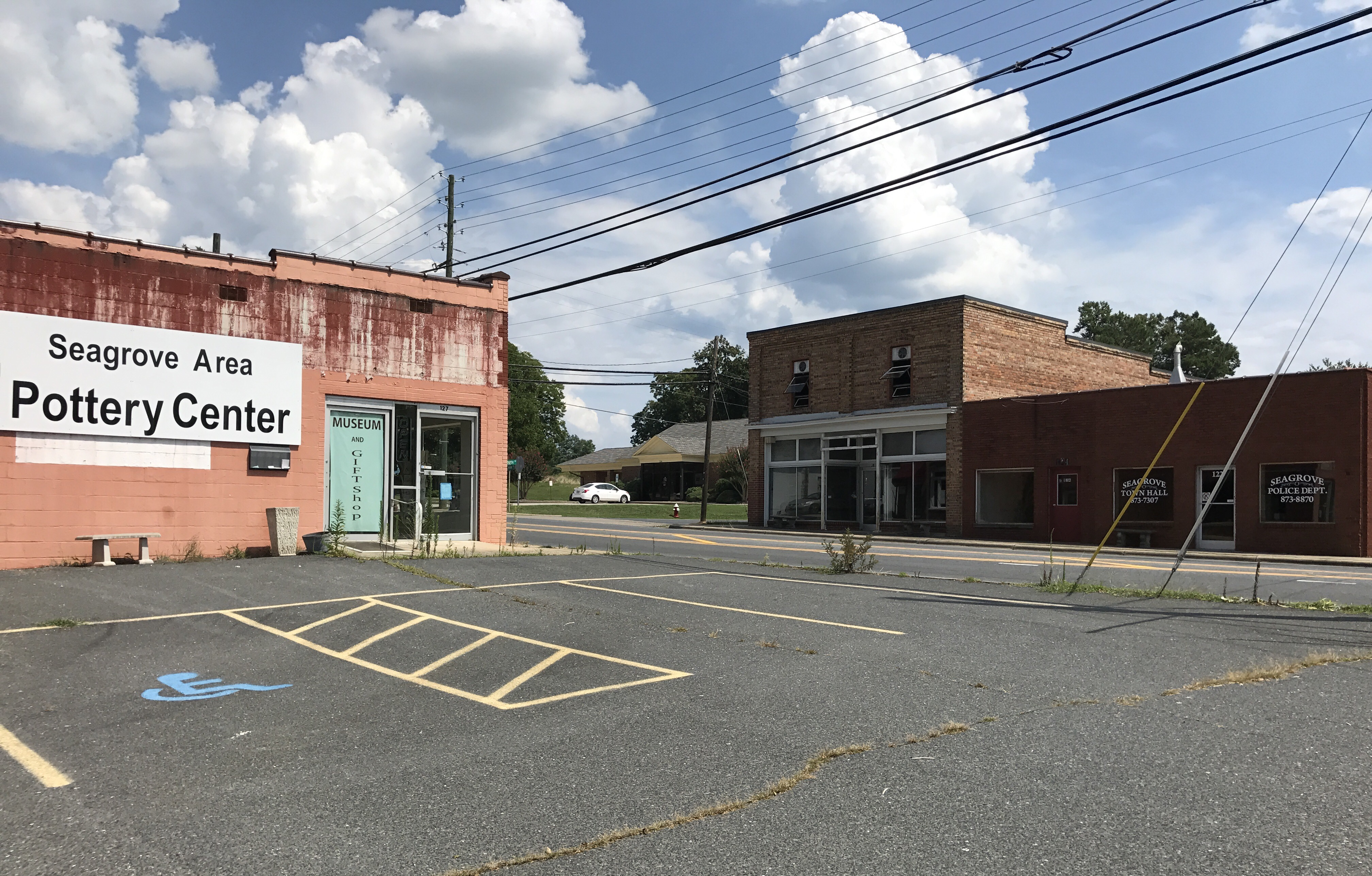
- Downtown Seagrove

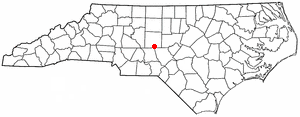
- Location of Seagrove, North Carolina
- Coordinates: 35°32′21″N 79°46′49″W
- Country: United States
- State: North Carolina
- County: Randolph
- Incorporated: 1913
- Named for: Edwin G. Seagraves

Government
  - Mayor: David Fernandez

Area
  - Total: 1.15 sq mi (2.98 km^{2})
  - Land: 1.15 sq mi (2.97 km^{2})
  - Water: 0.0039 sq mi (0.01 km^{2})
- Elevation: 722 ft (220 m)

Population (2020)
  - Total: 235
  - Density: 205.2/sq mi (79.23/km^{2})
- Time zone: UTC-5 (Eastern (EST))
  - Summer (DST): UTC-4 (EDT)
- ZIP code: 27341
- Area code: 336
- FIPS code: 37-60080
- GNIS feature ID: 2407304
- Website: www.townofseagrove.org/index.html

Seagrove is a town in Randolph County, North Carolina, United States. As of the 2020 census, Seagrove had a population of 235. It was named after a railroad official when the area was connected by rail. In 2020, the center of population of North Carolina was located east of Seagrove.

In this usage, the name Seagrove not only refers to the town proper, but also includes several other communities that are part of the pottery tradition along and near the "North Carolina Pottery Highway" (NC 705). Over 100 potteries are located in Seagrove and the neighboring towns of Robbins and Star. This also includes the unincorporated communities of Erect, Happy Hollow, Westmoore and Whynot. Seagrove is also home to the North Carolina Pottery Center, which was established on November 7, 1998, and has since received visitors from across the continent and around the world.

== History ==
Seagrove was named for Edwin G. Seagraves, a railroad official who was responsible for routing a railroad through the area. According to local sources, after a unanimous decision to name the station after Seagraves, the town name resulted from a sign painter running out of space and simply dropping the 's' from the end of the name. Also, the painter misspelled Seagraves as Seagrove. The railroad served Seagrove until December 31, 1951. The old train depot later was adapted as a pottery museum.

=== Plank Road ===
Construction of Plank Road began in 1849. Plank Road extended 129 miles (208 km) and was made of planks 8 feet (2.4 m) long, 9 to 16 inches (230 to 410 mm) wide, and 3 inches (76 mm) thick. The road carried horseback riders, wagons, and stagecoaches. A toll of one cent per mile (1.6 km) was charged for a wagon and four horses. Toll revenues declined after construction of the railroad, and by 1862 much of Plank Road was abandoned.

Parts of North Carolina Highway 705 follow the Plank Road route.

=== Seagrove School ===
A school funded by members of the community was established on April 3, 1911. The school moved to a new site in 1918 and again in 1926. The school burned on March 24, 1934, and was subsequently rebuilt. The small Seagrove school accepted students from elementary to high school until the fall of 1970.

In 1970 high school students were reassigned to the new Southwestern Randolph High School. In the fall of 1990, Seagrove students in the 6th through 8th grades began attending Southwestern Randolph Middle School. Today, the building is known as Seagrove Elementary School and serves students only from Kindergarten until the 5th grade. It also has a daycare for students.

=== Pottery ===
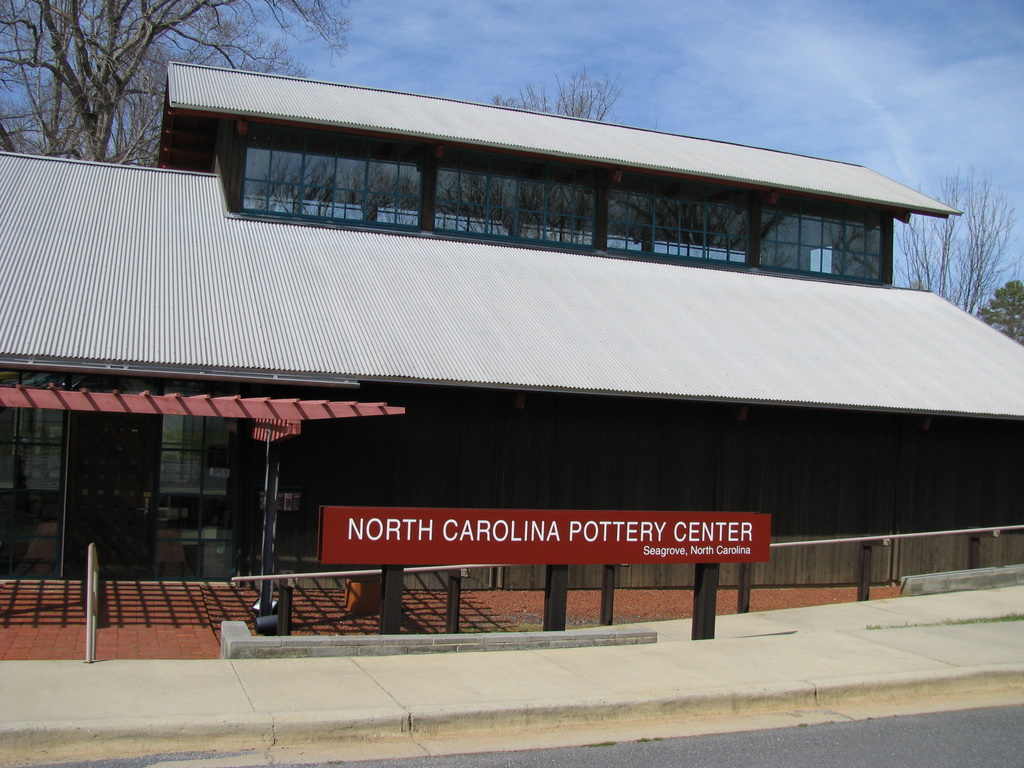
The North Carolina Pottery Center is a museum which highlights the Seagrove region's pottery traditions.

Seagrove's pottery tradition dates back to the 18th century before the American Revolution. Many of the first Seagrove potters were Scots-Irish immigrants. They primarily produced functional, glazed earthenware. Due to the high quality of the local clay and transportation access for traders, Seagrove became known for its pottery.

The popularity of Seagrove pottery fell off during the Industrial Revolution and the advent of modern food preparation. For a time whisky jugs were a successful source of income, but the beverage was outlawed. The potteries continued their decline in the early 20th century.

In 1915, Jacques and Juliana Busbee of Raleigh made an effort to revive the industry. Over several decades, the Busbees hired Seagrove potters JH Owen, Charlie Teague, and Ben Owen to make signature wares under the name Jugtown Pottery to sell in the Village Shop, which they opened in Greenwich Village, NYC, and later from the Jugtown shop in Seagrove.

Around 1920, a new market developed as the pottery became popular with tourists driving past on their way to Pinehurst, Southern Pines, or Florida buying inexpensive souvenirs. The new tourist industry marked a general change from utilitarian pottery to more decorative ware. After another decline from the 1950s through 1970s due to the road being replaced with the Interstate, a renewed interest in traditional pottery developed. In 1982 a group of local potters founded the North Carolina Museum of Traditional Pottery and organized the Seagrove Pottery Festival, an annual event held each year the weekend before Thanksgiving in the old bean cannery.

The Cole, Auman, Owen, Teague, and Albright families are eighth- and ninth-generation potters in Seagrove who continue this tradition.

Some of the oldest, historic pottery locations still in operation include the "Original" Owens Pottery founded in 1895 and Jugtown Pottery founded in 1921. Jugtown Pottery was added to the National Register of Historic Places in 1999.

=== Pinto Beans ===
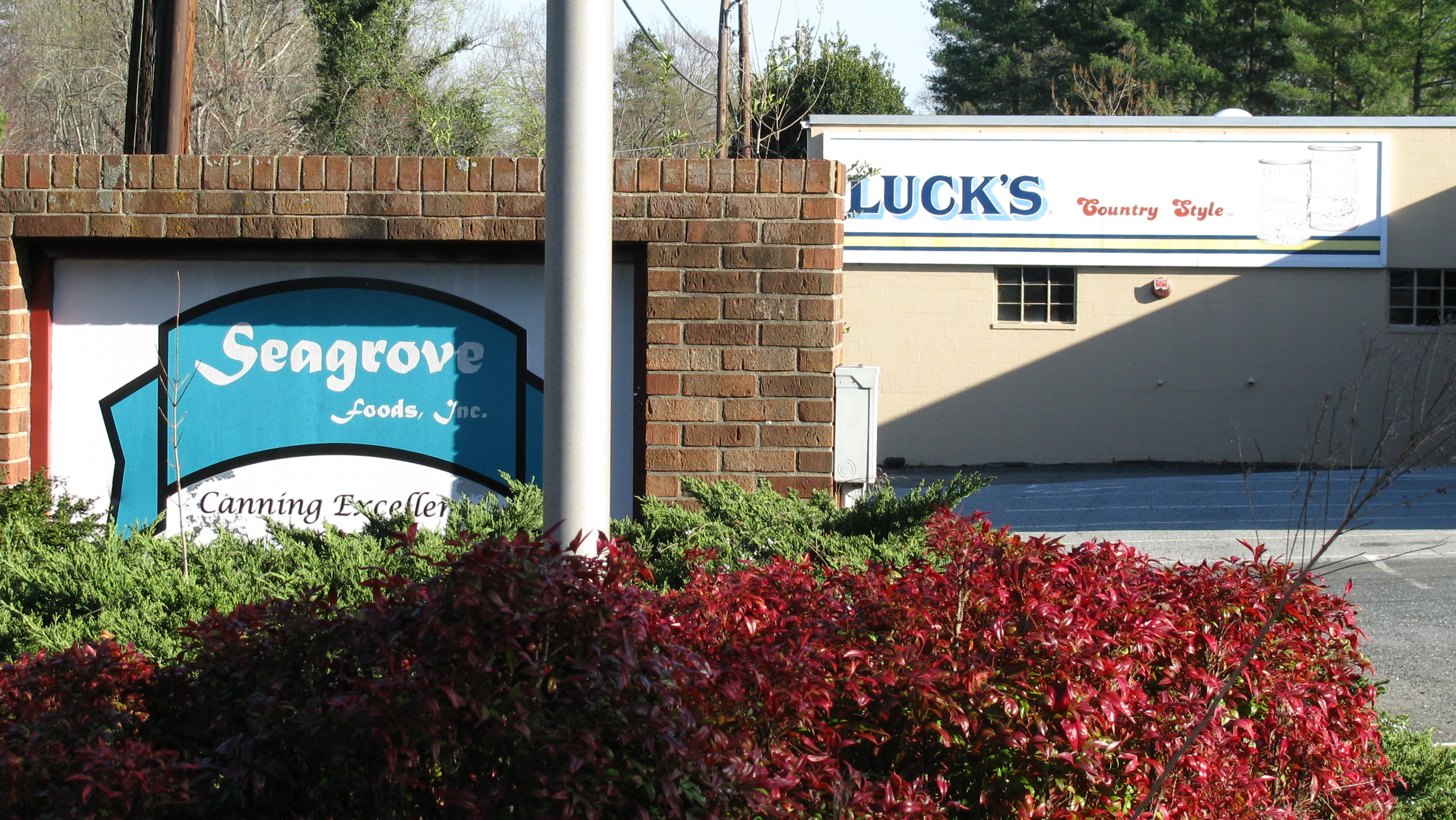
Luck's Cannery in Seagrove

Seagrove has a tradition in food products, and was home for many years to Luck's Incorporated, founded in the 1950s as Mountain View Cannery in the 1950s by Ivey B. Luck, Alfred Spencer & H. Clay Presnell. When Spencer and Presnell sold out to Luck, the establishment became known as Luck's. Luck's specialized in pinto beans and other canned vegetables and food products, and employed many Seagrove families. Bought out by American Home Products and then later by Conagra Foods and Arizona Canning Company, the Luck's plant closed in 2002. Currently, the plant is being used as the towns police station as well as being used for the "Celebration of Seagrove Potters" every November, and other local events.

== Geography ==
According to the United States Census Bureau, the town has a total area of 0.7 square miles (1.8 km^{2}), of which 0.7 square miles (1.8 km^{2}) is land and 1.37% is water.

The center of population for the state of North Carolina is located approximately two miles east of Seagrove.

== Economy ==
Each year, thousands of visitors come to Seagrove to see the area's potteries. Seagrove's economy is dependent on tourist revenue from pottery buyers.

== Demographics ==
Historical population
Census	Pop.	Note	%±
1920	189		—
1930	245		29.6%
1940	316		29.0%
1950	319		0.9%
1960	323		1.3%
1970	354		9.6%
1980	294		−16.9%
1990	244		−17.0%
2000	246		0.8%
2010	228		−7.3%
2020	235		3.1%
U.S. Decennial Census

As of the census of 2000, there were 246 people, 109 households, and 69 families residing in the town. The population density was 338.8 inhabitants per square mile (130.8/km^{2}). There were 119 housing units at an average density of 163.9 per square mile (63.3/km^{2}). The racial makeup of the town was 95.12% White, 1.22% African American, 0.81% Native American, 2.85% from other races. Hispanic or Latino of any race were 3.25% of the population.

There were 109 households, out of which 23.9% had children under the age of 18 living with them, 49.5% were married couples living together, 9.2% had a female householder with no husband present, and 35.8% were non-families. 32.1% of all households were made up of individuals, and 12.8% had someone living alone who was 65 years of age or older. The average household size was 2.26 and the average family size was 2.83.

In the town, the population was spread out, with 20.7% under the age of 18, 10.6% from 18 to 24, 25.6% from 25 to 44, 24.0% from 45 to 64, and 19.1% who were 65 years of age or older. The median age was 41 years. For every 100 females, there were 90.7 males. For every 100 females age 18 and over, there were 87.5 males.

The median income for a household in the town was $31,250, and the median income for a family was $40,750. Males had a median income of $25,625 versus $19,327 for females. The per capita income for the town was $15,824. About 9.0% of families and 9.0% of the population were below the poverty line, including 13.3% of those under the age of 18 and none of those 65 or over.
