= Kern's (beverage company) =

Beverage company

Kern's, and Kern’s Beverages commonly known as Kern's, is a food company based in Heredia, Costa Rica, owned by the Costa Rican food conglomerate FIFCO. The United States’ subsidiary, Kern’s US is based in Santa Ana, California, but often the drinks are manufactured in Mexico.

Their main product line is Kern's Nectar, a non-carbonated, sweetened fruit nectar drink, which uses fruit puree as the primary flavoring agent. Kern's Nectar is sold in a variety of containers, with many flavors featuring tropical fruits. The US subsidiary also produces Mexican beverages like agua frescas and horchata for the Mexican market.

== History ==
The company was started in 1889 and grew in the 1920s, being incorporated in 1932. The company was acquired by Nestlé in 1985. In 2006, Kern's was sold to FIFCO.
