= Jugtown Pottery =

- U.S. National Register of Historic Places
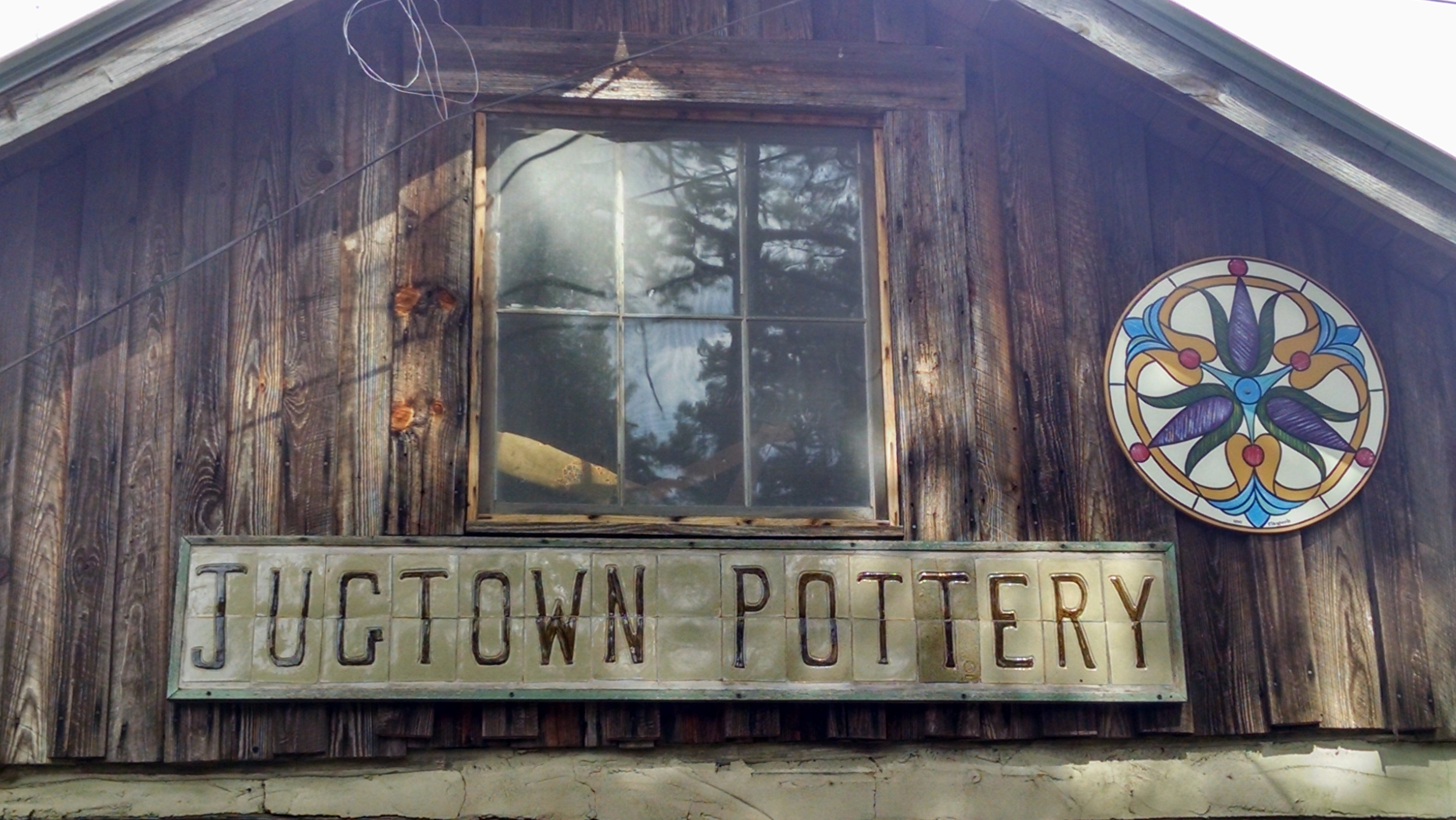
- Jugtown Pottery main shop building

- Location within North Carolina Location within the United States
- Location: 330 Jugtown Rd., near Seagrove, North Carolina
- Coordinates: 35°30′27″N 79°39′06″W
- Area: 12 acres (4.9 ha)
- Built: 1921
- Built by: Scott, Henry
- NRHP reference No.: 99001284
- Added to NRHP: November 12, 1999

Jugtown Pottery was founded in 1921 by Jacques and Juliana Busbee, artists from Raleigh, North Carolina, who in 1917 discovered an orange pie dish and traced it back to Moore County. There, they found a local tradition of utilitarian pottery in orange, earthenware, and salt glazes. The Busbees saw an opportunity to help save a dying craft, and in 1918 they set up the village store in Greenwich Village, New York, in order to sell the pottery. Potters they worked with over the years included J. H. Owen, Charlie Teague, and Ben Owen.

Jacques died in 1947. In 1960, John Mare bought Jugtown Pottery and hired Vernon Owens as the Jugtown thrower. After the sudden deaths of Mare and Juliana in 1962, Owens leased the business and kept it going for six years, until it was sold to Country Roads, Inc., a nonprofit organization working toward the preservation of hand crafts.

Under the direction of Country Roads, Nancy Sweezy served as director and potter. Sweezy changed the earthenware glazes to fritted lead glazes, then developed a new line of high temperature glazes in order to make them lead-free. She also developed a completely different line of complex colors, including Blueridge Blue, Cinnamon, a different Tobacco Spit, Mustard and Dogwood White. Sweezy also set up an apprenticeship program that served over thirty pottery students from 1969 through 1980.

In 1983 Country Roads moved on to another project, and Vernon Owens bought Jugtown. He has run it with his wife Pam Owens since then. Pam and Vernon opened the Jugtown Museum in 1988. Jugtown Pottery was listed in the National Register of Historic Places in 1999. The listing includes the log sales room, log turning room with attached pugmill, frame glaze room, and two kilns beneath a shelter, all built about 1921, and the house added to the complex about 1924.

Jugtown Pottery is located near the Pottery Road on North Carolina Highway 705, an area known for many potteries.
