= La Costeña (food company) =

Mexican canned foods company

- Logo used since 1996

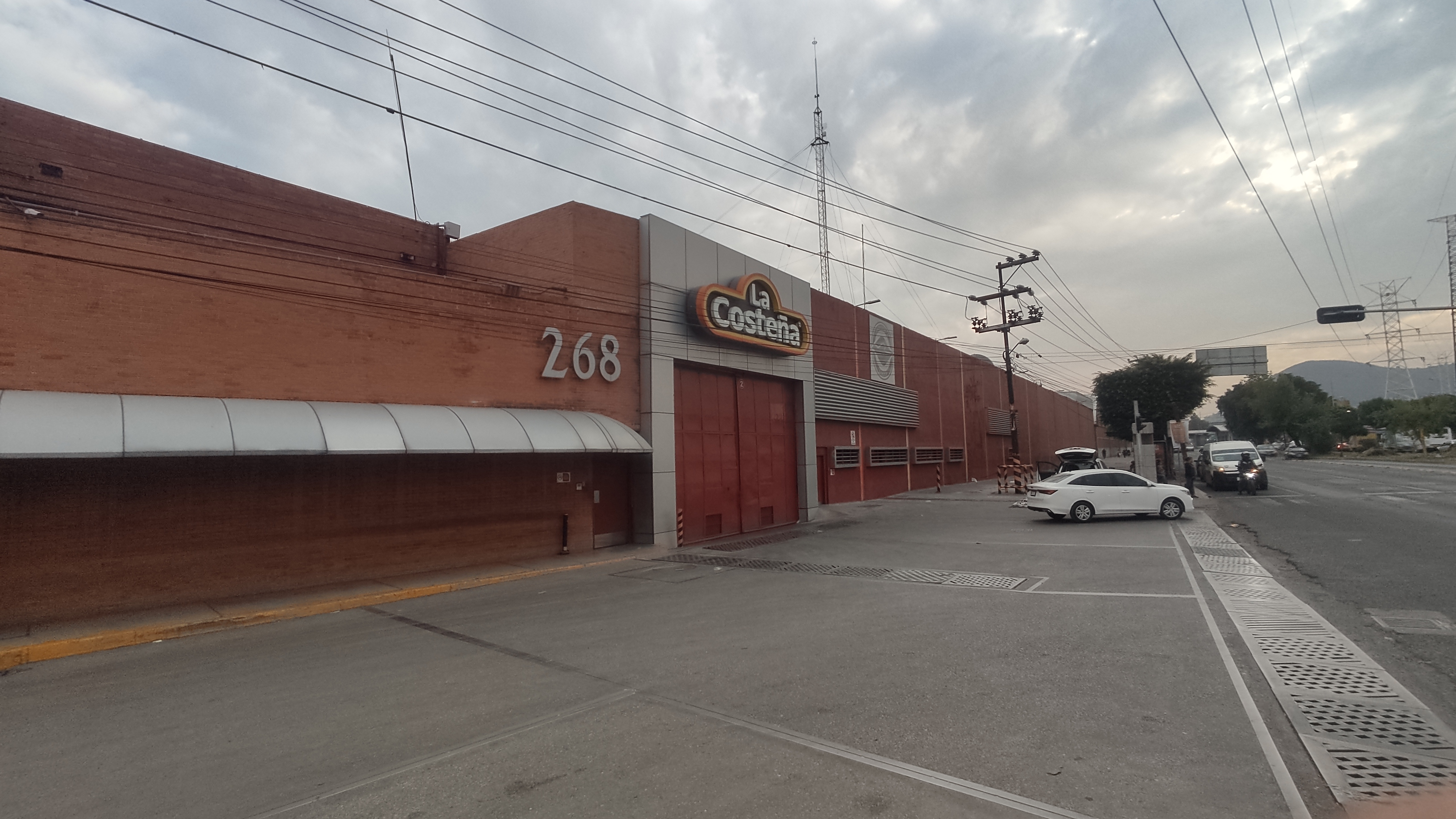
- Founded: 1923; 103 years ago
- Founder: Vicente López Recines
- Headquarters: Ecatepec de Morelos, Mexico
- Number of locations: 623
- Area served: Worldwide
- Key people: Vicente López Recines

Conservas La Costeña, usually called La Costeña, is a Mexican brand of canned products. It was founded in 1923 by Vicente López Recines. The company has become an important brand inside and outside Mexico. Nowadays, La Costeña sells its products across Mexico and in 40 countries around the world. While all its products in the beginning were chilies, the company later began producing new products such as beans, ketchup, vegetables and others. The production plants have been modified also, in addition there is the fact that the factories have won some recognitions for the changes in technology and process.

== History ==
La Costeña was founded in 1923 by Vicente López Recines. He bought a little grocery shop called “La Costeña” where he began preparing chili peppers in vinegar. He packaged and sold chilies in 20-kilogram jars with alcohol so that they could last longer. By 1937 López decided to make his own jar company; this decision changed the business. In 1948, he founded the principal factory in Mexico City. It has an area of five thousand square meters. The new production plant counted on forklift trucks and transport units; as a consequence the business continued growing up and increasing their distribution territory. The business began its industrialization with the application of the first automatic production line with 3-kilogram cans in 1951. Four years later the company installed an automatic production line to making 105-gram cans, moreover the distribution inside the country began. By 1971 the factory moved to Ecatepec with a facility of 180,000 square meters. Since then this facility has increased by 70 thousand square meters.

In 1975 the company entered the U.S. market. The company continued growing and by 1991 it had founded a new production plant in Sonora for the production of ketchup, vegetables, and more. In 1994 a new plant was built in San Luis Potosí. In 2006 a new project about a completely automatic plant began; this new plant would work with robots; this creation represents a better and faster production with more quality.

In 2014, La Costeña acquired the American canning company Faribault Foods, founded in 1895. In 2015, La Costeña announced it would triple Faribault Foods manufacturing and warehouse space in Faribault, Minnesota to nearly 1 million square ft. over the next three years. The Faribault brands include S&W beans, SunVista beans and sauces, Luck's beans, KC Masterpiece baked beans, Mrs. Grimes chili beans, Kuner's of Colorado vegetables, Kern's nectar, Butter Kernel vegetables, ChilliMan chili, Pride vegetables and Totis snacks.

== Distribution ==
Since its creation (1923), La Costeña's market share and reach have been core business interests; as a result, the territory served by the company has continued to grow. Inside Mexico, La Costeña products are sold by small and large shops in every state. To service them, there are thirty distribution centers located in key cities throughout Mexico. There are also two international distribution centers, one each serving North America and Europe; products are also sold by independent and chain groceries throughout the world. There are three Mexican production plants (in State of Mexico, San Luis Potosí and Guasave) creating the brand's products for the various distribution centers. The distribution centers are located in Yucatán, Tabasco, Chiapas, Oaxaca, Veracruz, Puebla, Acapulco, State of México, Hidalgo, Morelos (three), Queretaro, Guanajuato, San Luis Potosí, Aguascalientes, Jalisco, Nuevo León, Durango, Torreón, Tamaulipas, Sonora, Sinaloa, Chihuahua (two), Baja California Norte and Baja California Sur.

As of 2010 the company exported products to 40 countries; to manage this trade it has offices all over the world such as those in Spain and mainland China. According to the trade paper Soy Entrepreneur, in the same year La Costeña controlled sixty-nine percent of the world chile market, with sixteen percent of its output going to other countries.

== Products ==
The company has a wide variety of products in different presentations. Their main products are chilies, beans, tomato puree, ketchup, mayonnaise, vegetables, creams and soups, sauces, specialties, vinegar, fruit, jams and marmalades, portion packs, Dona Chonita, Rancherita, and French’s.

=== Chili peppers ===
Products include jalapeños, nacho chilies (slices of jalapeños), jalapeño bits, serrano, serrano slices, rajas rojas, rajas verdes, tomatillos, chipotles, chipotle bits, carrot pieces and long chili peppers.

=== Beans ===
Another big part of the products are beans (black beans and kidney beans). Their presentations can be whole, refried and shattered beans. Some of them can be also mixed with chorizo, cheese, chipotle and pork rinds, finally the beans can be already prepared from traditional recipes as the frijoles charros or sauce for enfrijoladas (similar to enchiladas). However, PROFECO (special institute for the Mexican products quality) found that there was more sodium recommended in some canned beans.

=== Tomato puree ===
In tomato puree products one can find four different preparations: tomato puree, condiment tomato puree, condiment fire tomato and chopped peeled tomatoes. These tomato sauces are used to create the base for some Mexican soups and some Mexican dishes. The presentation is done for the ketchup squeeze bottle, ketchup glass bottle, and ketchup style sauce. The squeezy presentation target are kids.

=== Mayonnaise ===
In mayonnaise products there are a lot of presentations: the mayonnaise with lemon juice in bottle and squeezy presentations, mayonnaise dressing for salads in bottle and squeeze bottle presentations, light mayonnaise in bottle and squeezy presentations, mayonnaise with jalapeño in bottle and squeezy presentations and mayonnaise with chipotle in bottle and squeezy presentations.

=== Vegetables ===
For the vegetables there are five different presentations: golden corn, peas, vegetable salads, peas with carrots, and sliced capsicums.

=== Soups ===
In the creams and soups there are a lot of presentations: corn, bean, mushrooms, asparagus, and poblano chill creams. There are also chicken and vegetable, lentil soup, and Jalisco and Guerrero Pozole presentations.

== In the United States ==
La Costeña entered the international market in 1975. Since the beginning the U.S. was its principal goal with 90% of La Costeña exports going there. The United States has a large Hispanic population, who are the principal buyers of La Costeña products, however the products have become very popular among the rest of the population with chilies (Jalapeños, nachos, Chipotle, among others) as the best sellers. In June 2006, La Costeña established a production plant in Arizona; the plant was built in 2001 for Slim Fast Foods, however it has closed in 2004. The new plant is on the Interstate 10 freeway, which also connects to Interstate 8, helping distribution to southern California. As part of the plant production, La Costeña acquired the SunVista brand. After the economic crisis, the company has made reduced sales in the U.S.. Although the economy has since improved, food companies have not yet seen any recovery. Until March 2010 the growth was lower than the growth in 2009. This has driven the company to the search for new markets such as Asian markets.

In 2014, La Costeña acquired Faribault Foods; brands include S&W beans, Butter Kernel, Kuner's, Mrs. Grimes, Pride, and Chilliman.

== Awards ==
The company has won many important prizes at national and international levels. In June it won “El Premio Nacional de Logística 2010” (National Logistic Award 2010) for its advances in production, distribution and lower cost; this is the second time it won it, the first was in 2007. They also got the ISO-9002 on October 11, 2010. This prize gives the recognition of standards for quality management systems. Other certificates are ISO 22000, HACCP (Hazard Analysis Critical Control Points), BRC (British Retail Consortium), IFS (International Food Standard), SQF (Safety Quality Food), BASC (Business Alliance for Secure Commerce). Most of them give the company worldwide recognition.

== Charity and charitable ==
La Costeña provides some of its production and profits to charities, and when there is a natural disaster in the country relief helping affected people with merchandise. First, La Costeña provides some of its products when there is a natural disaster in Mexico or other countries; for example the canned products that were donated to Chile after the earthquakes in 2010. Second, it also participated in charity programas, one example is the contribution made annually to the Teletón event that takes place in Mexico City.

== Grupo La Costeña ==
Grupo La Costeña
- Native name: Grupo CLC, S.A. de C.V.
- Type: Private
- Industry: Food processing, agribusiness, packaging
- Founded: 1923; 103 years ago
- Founder: Vicente López Resines
- Area served: Worldwide
- Key people: Vicente López Rodea (former chairman); Federico López Flores (director general)
- Products: Canned vegetables, peppers, beans, coffee, sauces, snacks, fruit preserves, packaging
- Subsidiaries: Conservas La Costeña; Sabormex; Faribault Foods; Aconcagua Foods; Totis; Galletas Marian; Grupak
- Website: www.lacostena.com.mx

Grupo La Costeña (legally registered as Grupo CLC, S.A. de C.V.) is the multinational food processing and agribusiness conglomerate of which La Costeña proper (Conservas La Costeña) is a part. Headquarters are in Ecatepec de Morelos, State of Mexico, in Greater Mexico City. The private group has expanded via international acquisitions and entered into the coffee roasting, bakery products, savory snacks, fruit packaging, and paper manufacturing businesses.

The group oversees the following operating units:

- Conservas La Costeña: The flagship division, producing canned chili peppers, sauces, beans, and preserved vegetables which are distributed across the Americas, Europe, and Asia.
- Sabormex: food and beverage company whose portfolio includes:
  - Coffee and hospitality: the Café Garat, Café Legal, Café Oro coffee brands, plus the Tierra Garat coffeehouse chain.
  - Packaged foods: Clemente Jacques (mayonnaise, condiments, and canned chiles) and Frijoles La Sierra.
- Faribault Foods: manufacturing and retail canning subsidiary in the United States, acquired in 2014. It distributes brands such as S&W Beans, SunVista, Luck’s, and Kuner’s.
- Aconcagua Foods: agroindustrial company based in Buin, Chile, producing canned fruits, tomatoes, and vegetables for South American and other international markets.
- Snacks and bakery: manufacturing Totis wheat and corn snacks, Nipon Japanese-style peanuts, and Galletas Marian (packaged cookies and pastry products).
- Grupak: industrial paper and corrugated packaging division that makes packaging containers and cartons for use internally and for other consumer goods companies.

== See also ==
- Goya Foods
