= North Carolina Highway 705 =

State highway in North Carolina, US

North Carolina Highway 705

Route information
- Maintained by NCDOT
- Length: 26.1 mi (42.0 km)
- Existed: 1931–present

Major junctions
- South end: NC 211 near Eagle Springs
- NC 24 / NC 27 in Robbins US 220 Alt. in Seagrove
- North end: I-73 / I-74 / US 220 near Seagrove

Location
- Country: United States
- State: North Carolina
- Counties: Moore, Randolph

Highway system
- North Carolina Highway System; Interstate; US; State; Scenic
← NC 704	→ NC 710

North Carolina Highway 705 (NC 705) is a primary state highway in the U.S. state of North Carolina. The route is marked as the Pottery Highway or Pottery Road and as a North Carolina Scenic Byway due to the large number of potters in and surrounding Seagrove.

== Route description ==
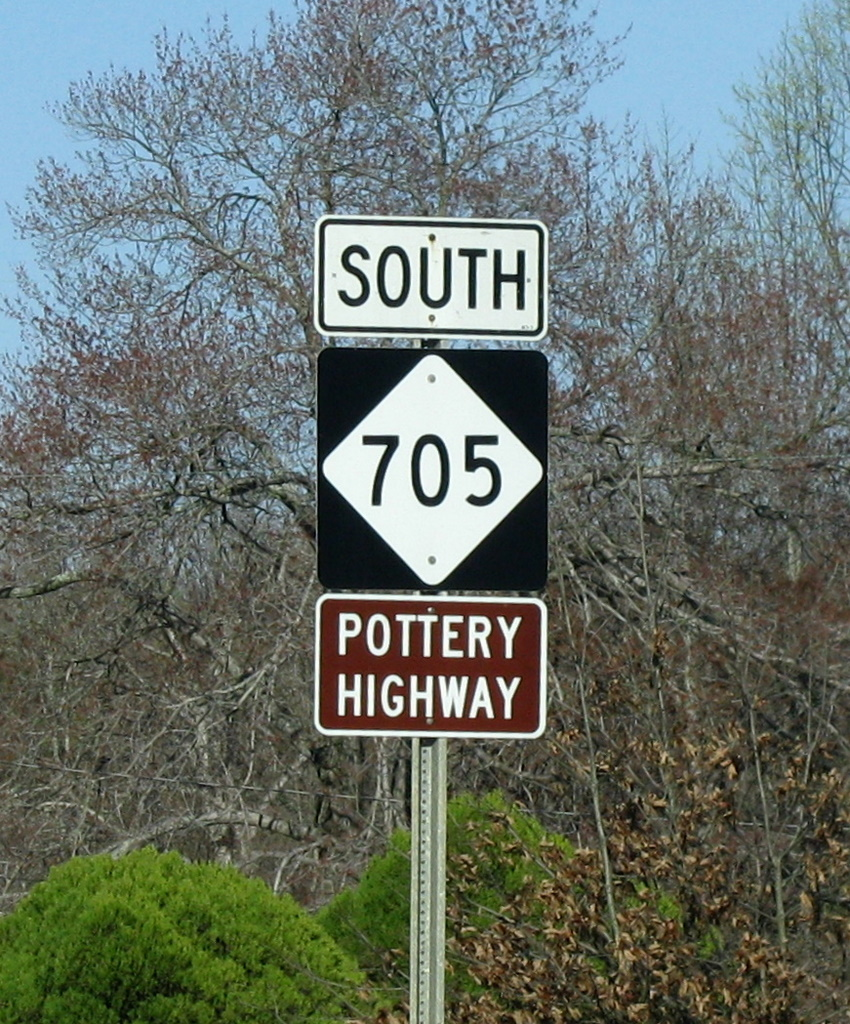
NC Hwy 705 Pottery Highway

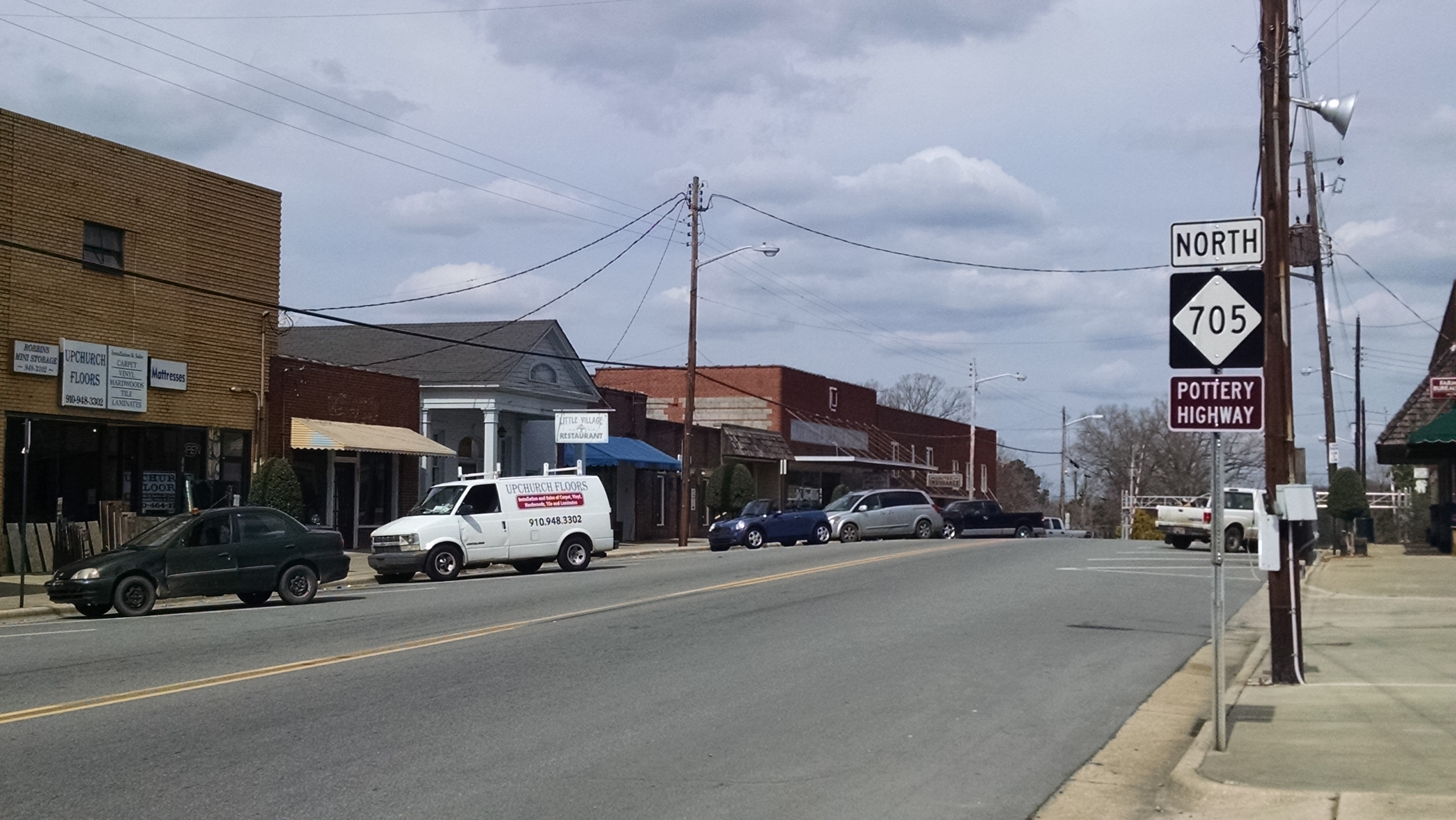
NC 705 North in the central business district of Robbins, North Carolina.

NC 705 begins at a northern terminus near Seagrove, North Carolina at I-73/I-74US 220 exit 45. It passes through Seagrove, crossing US 220 Alternate. The highway travels southeasterly in Randolph County where it passes through the community of Whynot southeast of Seagrove.

The route passes into Moore County just north of the communities of Dover and Westmoore. It continues southwesterly through Robbins, North Carolina where it junctions with NC 24/NC 27 just south of Robbins at the community of Garners Store. From the junction, the route turns southeasterly and continues through the community of Zion Grove until it ends in the community of Elberta near Eagle Springs, North Carolina.

=== Pottery Road ===
The route takes the traveler through historic areas of North Carolina which have been making and selling hand-turned or "hand-thrown" pottery since the eighteenth century. The area potters produce traditional functional pottery as well as artistic pottery.

The Cole, Auman, Owen, Teague, and Albright families are eighth- and ninth-generation potters in Seagrove and the surrounding areas.

Some of the oldest, historic pottery locations still in operation include the "Original" Owens Pottery founded in 1895 and Jugtown Pottery founded in 1921. Jugtown is listed on the National Register of Historic Places.

=== Plank Road ===
Portions of the route are part of the Fayetteville and Western Plank Road connecting the city of Fayetteville, North Carolina with Moravian settlements near Bethania, North Carolina (northwest of Winston-Salem).

== Junction list ==
County	Location	mi	km	Destinations	Notes
Moore	Eagle Springs	0.0	0.0	NC 211 / Eagle Springs Road – Candor, West End	
Moore	Robbins	9.2	14.8	NC 24 / NC 27 – Carthage, Biscoe	
Randolph	Seagrove	25.2	40.6	US 220 Alt. (Broad Street)	
Randolph		26.0– 26.1	41.8– 42.0	I-73 / I-74 / US 220 / Little River Road – Asheboro, Rockingham	Exit 61 (I-73/I-74)
1.000 mi = 1.609 km; 1.000 km = 0.621 mi

== See also ==
- North Carolina Bicycle Route 6 - Concurrent with NC 705 from Old Plank Road in Seagrove to I-73/I-74/US 220
