= Nancy Sweezy =

American writer and artist (1921–2010)

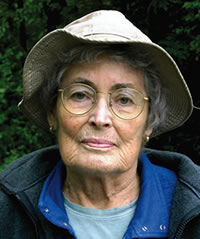
- Sweezy in 2007
- Born: Nancy Thompson; October 14, 1921; Flushing, Queens, New York, U.S.
- Died: February 6, 2010 (aged 88); Cambridge, Massachusetts, U.S.
- Education: School of the Museum of Fine Arts, Boston
- Known for: Potter, folklorist, author, owner of Jugtown Pottery (1968–1980)
- Spouse: Paul Sweezy (div. 1960)
- Awards: National Heritage Fellowship; 2006

Nancy Sweezy (October 14, 1921 – February 6, 2010) was an American artist, author, folklorist, advocate, scholar, and preservationist. Known initially for her work as a potter in the 1950s, Sweezy became a scholar of the history and creation of pottery and wrote several authoritative texts and books on U.S. and international folk pottery. She was a major figure in the establishment of markets for folk and traditional crafts. Other major accomplishments in her extensive career included the founding of the crafts organization Country Roads, the revival of North Carolina's historic Jugtown Pottery, and the creation of the Refugee Arts Group in Massachusetts for immigrant folk artists. Her advocacy work also included developing apprenticeship programs. She also was involved with Club 47, a famous performing scene in the American folk music revival.

In 2006, she was awarded the Bess Lomax Hawes Award and a National Heritage Fellowship awarded by the National Endowment for the Arts, which is the United States' highest honor in the folk and traditional arts. She was the author of several books including Raised in Clay and Armenian Folk Arts, Culture and Identity. Her professional archive of 32,992 items collected over the course of her career as a folklorist, folk arts advocate, and non-profit organization administrator is held by the Archive of Folk Culture at the American Folklife Center, Library of Congress.

== Personal life ==
Nancy Thompson was born in Flushing, Queens, New York in 1921. After her parents divorced, she was adopted by another family and was known as Nancy Adams. She attended the School of the Museum of Fine Arts in Boston. During World War II, she worked in the research branch of the Office of Strategic Services, the precursor of the Central Intelligence Agency.

She was married briefly to Bill House. She met her future second husband, the economist Paul Sweezy, in Germany. They divorced in 1960.

She died of congestive heart failure in Cambridge, Massachusetts on February 6, 2010. She had three children: Samuel, Martha, and Lybess. At the time of her death, she had five grandchildren and four great-grandchildren.

== Published works ==
- "Tradition in Clay: Piedmont Pottery" (1975, journal article)
- Raised in Clay: The Southern Pottery Tradition (1984)
- Southeast Asian Folk Art Festival (1989)
- Raised in Clay: A Guide to the Potteries and Traditions of Seagrove, North Carolina (2000)
- Armenian Folk Arts, Culture, and Identity (2001)
- The Potter's Eye: Art and Tradition in North Carolina Pottery (2005, North Carolina Museum of Art exhibition catalog)
