= Colección Jumex =

Museum in Mexico City, Mexico

Coordinates: 19°26′26″N 99°12′12″W

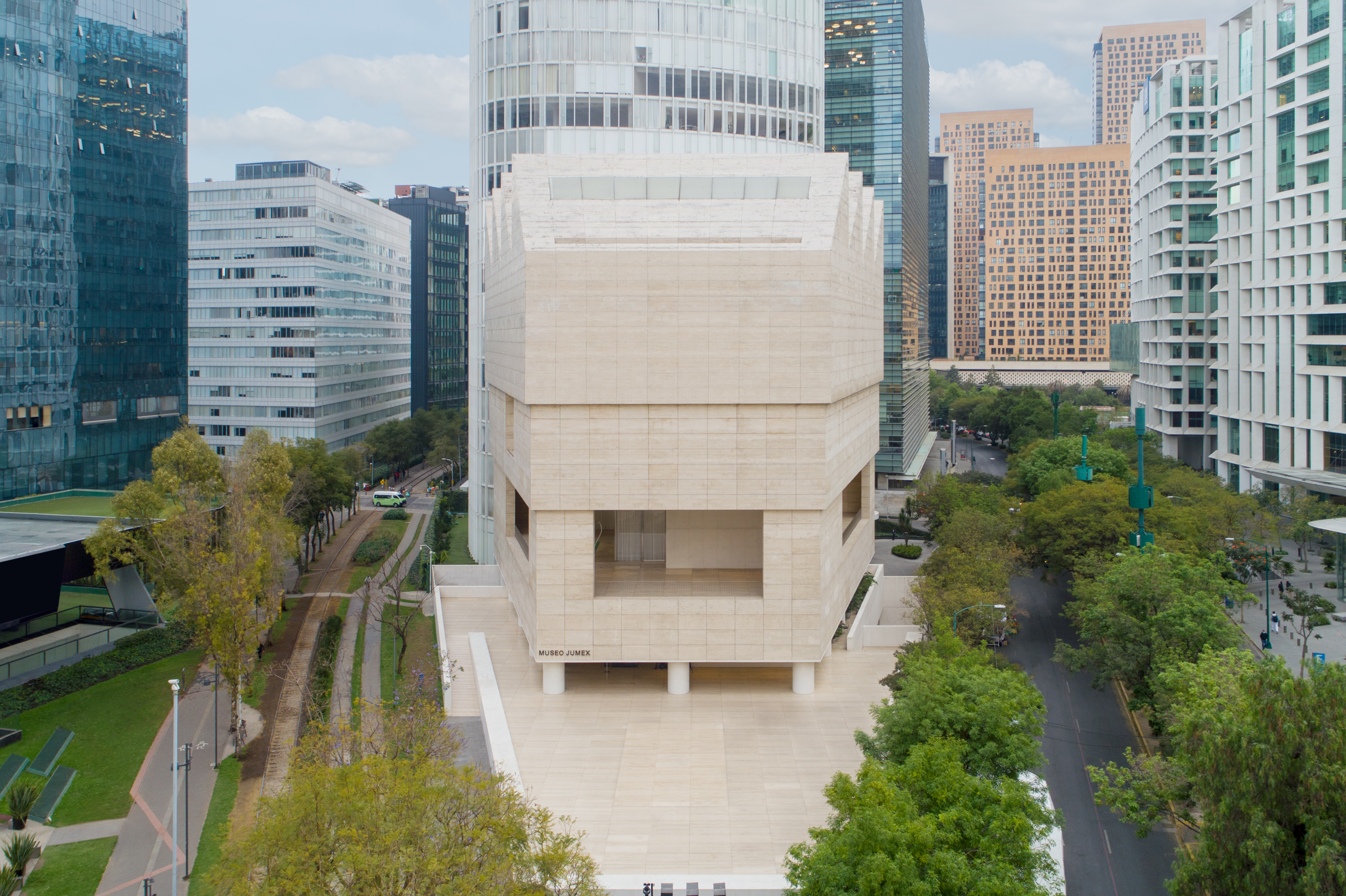
Museo Jumex

Colección Jumex is a private art collection owned by Eugenio López Alonso. The collection is housed at Museo Jumex, the main outpost of Fundación Jumex Arte Contemporáneo, located in the Polanco neighborhood in Mexico City. The museum opened in November 2013 in a building designed by David Chipperfield. The main purpose of the museum is to promote the production, discussion and knowledge about contemporary art in Mexico. The museum produces exhibitions and also showcases works that are part of the collection. The foundation has a scholarship program for supporting Mexican students who want to study graduate programs related to the field of contemporary arts. It also offers grants for artists and organizations that are dedicated to the production, research and promotion of contemporary art, both within Mexico and internationally.

The collection includes around 2,800 works by Damien Hirst, Andy Warhol, Gabriel Orozco, Cy Twombly, Jeff Koons, Marcel Duchamp, Josignacio, Andreas Gursky, Darren Almond, Tacita Dean, Olafur Eliasson, Martin Kippenberger, Carl Hopgood, Bruce Nauman, David Ostrowski, Francis Alÿs, Urs Fischer, Gego, Donald Judd, Ed Ruscha, Nancy Rubins, Richard Prince, Stefan Brüggemann, and Martin Creed. It is one of the most significant collections of contemporary art in Latin America.

== History ==
Eugenio López Alonso purchased his first work of Mexican art in 1994. That same year, he cofounded Chac Mool Gallery in Los Angeles with art advisor Esthella Provas. This was the symbolic beginning of Fundación Jumex Arte Contemporáneo: from the outset, López was more interested in sharing his interest in art than in amassing a collection of objects.

Over the 1990s, López Alonso spent his time studying contemporary art while also traveling and researching how to put together a collection that would encourage the development of the work of artists of his generation in Mexico.

Buying pieces by local and foreign artists while further broadening his scope and focus as a collector, López Alonso conceived Fundación Jumex with a team of art professionals in order to promote contemporary art through programs that involved collecting, education, research and the funding of artists and museums.

In 2015, Fundación Jumex made international headlines when it cancelled an exhibition of works by Hermann Nitsch, a decision denounced by collectors, curators and art critics as an "embarrassing act of censorship by a group striving to establish itself in the international art circuit."

For its tenth anniversary of the museum outpost located in Polanco, Museo Jumex presented a retrospective exhibition of British artist Damien Hirst in 2024, it was the first major institutional revision of the artist's work in Latin America.

== Venues ==
=== Galería Jumex ===
From 2001, López Alonso's collection was exhibited publicly for the first time at Galería Jumex: a 15,000 sq ft (1,400 m^{2}) space designed by Gerardo García on the premises of the Grupo Jumex juice plant in Ecatepec de Morelos. Though one sector of the art community was surprised by the gallery's location in an industrial area on the outskirts of Mexico City, López Alonso and his team were convinced that this space for experimentation would further aid the development of contemporary art in Mexico.

=== Museo Jumex ===
Located in the Polanco neighborhood of Mexico City, Museo Jumex opened its doors to the public in November 2013 as an institution devoted to contemporary art, whose aim was not only to serve a broad and diverse public, but also to become a laboratory for experimentation and innovation in the arts. Rosario Nadal served as deputy director of the museum from 2012 to 2019.

The building was designed by the Pritzker Architecture Prize-winning David Chipperfield Architects with an 1,600 m^{2} (17,000 sq ft) exhibition space. It is part of the mixed-use development Plaza Carso, which also includes a shopping mall, and sits across the street from another museum, Museo Soumaya. It was conceived in response to its surroundings and local context, incorporating domestically sourced materials. In addition to exhibition galleries, the museum features public spaces designed as meeting places and leisure areas that complement the visitor's experience.

== Management ==
=== Governance ===
The museum operates without a board of directors. The curators report directly to López.

=== Chief curators ===
- 1997–2005: Patricia Martín
- 2005–2015: Patrick Charpenel
- 2015–2020: Julieta González
- 2020–present: Kit Hammonds

=== Attendance ===
During the COVID-19 pandemic in Mexico, the museum abolished its entrance fee and made all of its offerings, including programs for families, completely free.

A 2023 retrospective of artist Jannis Kounellis drew more than 250,000 people.
