= National Register of Historic Places listings in Moore County, North Carolina =

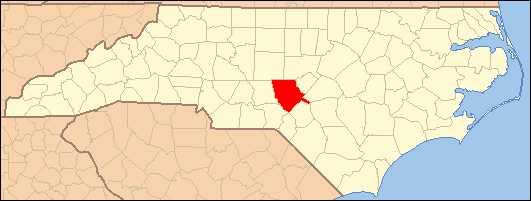

This list includes properties and districts listed on the National Register of Historic Places in Moore County, North Carolina. Click the "Map of all coordinates" link to the right to view an online map of all properties and districts with latitude and longitude coordinates in the table below.

== Current listings ==
This National Park Service list is complete through NPS recent listings posted May 1, 2026.

	Name on the Register	Image	Date listed	Location	City or town	Description
1	Aberdeen Historic District	Aberdeen Historic District	June 28, 1989 (#89000663)	Roughly bounded by Maple Ave., Bethesda Ave., Campbell St., Main St., Pine St., South St., and Poplar St. 35°07′53″N 79°25′29″W	Aberdeen	
2	Alston House	Alston House	February 26, 1970 (#70000462)	SE of Glendon on SR 1624; 35°28′00″N 79°23′02″W	Glendon	
3	Amos Broadway Building		August 8, 2025 (#100012079)	1071 West New York Avenue; 35°11′02″N 79°24′11″W	Southern Pines	
4	Bethesda Presbyterian Church	Bethesda Presbyterian Church	July 22, 1979 (#79003345)	NC 5; 35°07′52″N 79°24′45″W	Aberdeen	
5	J.C. Black House	J.C. Black House	July 8, 1999 (#99000811)	106 McNeill St. 35°20′44″N 79°24′55″W	Carthage	
6	Black-Cole House		September 18, 1978 (#78001967)	NW of Eastwood; 35°16′03″N 79°29′16″W	Eastwood	
7	Daniel Blue House		July 21, 1983 (#83001897)	SR 1836; 35°16′55″N 79°25′32″W	Carthage	
8	John Blue House		July 29, 1982 (#82003488)	200 Blue St. 35°07′50″N 79°25′22″W	Aberdeen	
9	Malcolm Blue Farm	Malcolm Blue Farm	June 1, 1982 (#82003489)	Bethesda Rd. and Ernest L. Ives Dr. 35°08′08″N 79°24′38″W	Aberdeen	
10	James Boyd House	James Boyd House	May 12, 1977 (#77001005)	Ridge Rd. and Connecticut Ave. 35°10′14″N 79°23′00″W	Southern Pines	
11	Bruce-Dowd-Kennedy House	Bruce-Dowd-Kennedy House	September 29, 1980 (#80002888)	Monroe and Rockingham Sts. 35°20′34″N 79°24′48″W	Carthage	
12	James Bryant House	James Bryant House	April 15, 1982 (#82003490)	On SR 1210; 35°19′07″N 79°32′41″W	Harris Crossroads	
13	Cameron Historic District		March 17, 1983 (#83001898)	Carthage St. from US 1 to Seaboard RR Tracks; 35°19′36″N 79°15′28″W	Cameron	
14	Carthage Historic District	Carthage Historic District	March 19, 1992 (#92000182)	Roughly, McReynolds St. between Barrett St. and Glendons Rd. and parts of Barrett, Ray, Pinecrest and Brooklyn Sts. 35°21′04″N 79°25′23″W	Carthage	
15	Firleigh Farms		May 19, 2014 (#14000229)	252 Fir Leigh Rd. 35°10′16″N 79°21′17″W	Southern Pines	
16	Gordon Payne Site (31MR15)		September 24, 1986 (#86001954)	Address Restricted	High Falls	
17	Jugtown Pottery	Jugtown Pottery	November 12, 1999 (#99001284)	330 Jugtown Rd. 35°30′27″N 79°39′06″W	Seagrove	
18	Alexander Kelly House	Alexander Kelly House	May 2, 2002 (#02000438)	NC 1640, 0.3 miles SE of jct. with NC 1666; 35°22′34″N 79°26′46″W	Carthage	
19	Lakeview Historic District		May 18, 2000 (#00000513)	Camp Easter Rd., Crystal Lake Dr., Holly Rd., Matthews Rd., and McFayden Ln. 35°14′25″N 79°18′41″W	Lakeview	
20	Leslie-Taylor House		January 17, 2008 (#07001407)	270 Carthage Rd. 35°15′26″N 79°17′47″W	Vass	
21	Lincoln Park School		February 27, 1997 (#97000167)	1272 S. Currant St. 35°05′06″N 79°28′25″W	Pinebluff	
22	Lloyd-Howe House	Lloyd-Howe House	September 8, 1983 (#83001899)	SW of Pinehurst; 35°11′15″N 79°29′38″W	Pinehurst	
23	McLeod Family Rural Complex		December 20, 1984 (#84000561)	.4 miles west of US 1; 35°04′33″N 79°30′06″W	Pinebluff	
24	Moore County Courthouse	Moore County Courthouse	May 10, 1979 (#79001738)	Ray, Dowd, Monroe, and Sanders Sts. circle 35°20′44″N 79°25′00″W	Carthage	
25	Moore County Hunt Lands and Mile-Away Farms		September 9, 2013 (#13000700)	1745 N. May St. 35°11′14″N 79°22′00″W	Southern Pines	
26	Our Lady of Victory Catholic Parish		December 29, 2025 (#100012451)	1109-1185 West Pennsylvania Avenue; 35°11′06″N 79°24′07″W	Southern Pines	
27	John Evander Phillips House	John Evander Phillips House	October 6, 2000 (#00001184)	NC 24/27, 0.3 mi outside Cameron; 35°19′47″N 79°15′45″W	Cameron	
28	Pinehurst Historic District	Pinehurst Historic District	August 14, 1973 (#73001361)	Roughly bounded by Norfolk & Southern RR tracks, McLean Rd. and NC 5; 35°11′41″N 79°28′11″W	Pinehurst	
29	Pinehurst Race Track	Pinehurst Race Track	November 27, 1992 (#92001628)	Jct. of Morgantown Rd. and NC 5, SE corner 35°10′54″N 79°27′59″W	Pinehurst	
30	Shaw House	Shaw House	June 17, 1993 (#93000542)	780 SW. Broad St. 35°10′05″N 79°24′06″W	Southern Pines	
31	Southern Pines Historic District	Southern Pines Historic District	December 27, 1991 (#91001875)	Bounded by Saylor St., New Jersey Ave., Illinois Ave. and Massachusetts Ave. Ext. 35°10′10″N 79°23′17″W	Southern Pines	
32	Trinity AME Zion Church		August 21, 2025 (#100012117)	972 West Pennsylvania Avenue; 35°10′59″N 79°24′02″W	Southern Pines	
33	Vass Cotton Mill		August 12, 2025 (#100012101)	340 Seaboard Street; 35°14′59″N 79°17′16″W	Vass	
34	West Southern Pines School		December 21, 2023 (#100009630)	1250 West New York Avenue; 35°11′08″N 79°24′17″W	Southern Pines	

== See also ==
- National Register of Historic Places listings in North Carolina
- List of National Historic Landmarks in North Carolina
