= Phillips House =

Phillips House may refer to:

in the United States

(by state then city)

- Phillips House (Arcata, California), listed on the National Register of Historic Places (NRHP) in Humboldt County
- Phillips House (Long Beach, California) listed among the City of Long Beach historic landmarks
- Phillips Mansion, Pomona, California, NRHP-listed in Los Angeles County
- Harry and Lilly Phillips House, Fruita, Colorado, NRHP-listed in Mesa County
- Capron-Phillips House, Coventry, Connecticut, NRHP-listed in Tolland County
- Phillips Potato House, Laurel, Delaware, NRHP-listed in Sussex County
- Dr. P. Phillips House, Orlando, Florida, NRHP-listed in Orange County
- George Phillips House, Columbus, Georgia, NRHP-listed in Muscogee County
- William D. Phillips Log Cabin, Hogansville, Georgia, NRHP-listed in Meriwether County
- Phillips-Sims House, Hogansville, Georgia, NRHP-listed in Troup County
- Phillips-Turner-Kelly House, Monticello, Georgia, NRHP-listed in Jasper County
- Alfred Phillips House, Gibson City, Illinois, NRHP-listed
- William Phillips House, Hodgenville, Kentucky, NRHP-listed in LaRue County
- Phillips' Folly, Maysville, Kentucky, NRHP-listed
- Josiah Phillips House, Sonora, Kentucky, NRHP-listed in Hardin County
- E. M. Phillips House, Southbridge, Massachusetts, NRHP-listed
- Phillips House, a VIP wing of Massachusetts General Hospital, Boston, Massachusetts
- Ernie Phillips House, Grandin, Missouri, NRHP-listed in Carter County
- Hotel Phillips, Kansas City, Missouri, NRHP-listed
- John Archibald Phillips House, Poplar Bluff, Missouri, NRHP-listed in Butler County
- R.O. Phillips House, Lincoln, Nebraska, NRHP-listed in Lancaster County
- Crane-Phillips House, Cranford, New Jersey, NRHP-listed
- Joseph Phillips Farm, Titusville, New Jersey, NRHP-listed in Mercer County
- Harriet Phillips Bungalow, Claverack, New York, NRHP-listed
- Phillips House (Poughkeepsie, New York), NRHP-listed
- John Evander Phillips House, Cameron, North Carolina, NRHP-listed in Evander County
- King-Phillips-Deibel House, Medina, Ohio, NRHP-listed in Medina County
- Frank and Jane Phillips House, Bartlesville, Oklahoma, NRHP-listed in Washington County
- Waite Phillips Mansion, Tulsa, Oklahoma, NRHP-listed in Tulsa County
- John Phillips House, Polk County, Oregon, NRHP-listed
- Joseph and Esther Phillips Plantation, Atglen, Pennsylvania, NRHP-listed
- Phillips House (Morristown, Tennessee), NRHP-listed in Hamblen County
- Judge Alexander H. Phillips House, Victoria, Texas, NRHP-listed in Victoria County
- E. F. Phillips House, Waxahachie, Texas, NRHP-listed in Ellis County
- Phillips-Ronald House, Blacksburg, Virginia, NRHP-listed in Montgomery County
- Phillips Farm, Suffolk, Virginia, NRHP-listed in Suffolk
- Dr. John and Viola Phillips House and Office, Newport, Washington, NRHP-listed in Pend Oreille County
- Phillips House (Seattle, Washington), NRHP-listed in Seattle
- Duncan Phillips House, Washington, D.C., NRHP-listed
- Phillips-Sprague Mine, Beckley, West Virginia, NRHP-listed

== See also ==
- Philips House (disambiguation)
