= Bryant House =

Bryant House may refer to:

- William Cullen Bryant Homestead, Cummington, Massachusetts
- Bryant–Cushing House, Norwell, Massachusetts
- William Bryant Octagon House, Stoneham, Massachusetts
- Bryant-Lasater House, Mulberry, Arkansas, listed on the National Register of Historic Places in Crawford County, Arkansas
- Bixby-Bryant Ranch House, Yorba Linda, California, listed on the National Register of Historic Places in Orange County, California
- Bryant House (Nicholasville, Kentucky), listed on the National Register of Historic Places in Jessamine County, Kentucky
- Garnett Bryant House, Oakland, Kentucky, listed on the National Register of Historic Places in Warren County, Kentucky
- Charles G. Bryant Double House, Bangor, Maine, listed on the National Register of Historic Places in Penobscot County, Maine
- James and Anne Atmore Bryant Farmstead, Wattles Park, Michigan, listed on the National Register of Historic Places in Calhoun County, Michigan
- Ballentine-Bryant House, Sardis, Mississippi, listed on the National Register of Historic Places in Panola County, Mississippi
- Dr. John S. Jr. and Harriet Smart Bryant House, Independence, Missouri, listed on the National Register of Historic Places listings in Jackson County, Missouri
- Edward W. and Rose Folsom Bryant House, Tekamah, Nebraska, listed on the National Register of Historic Places in Burt County, Nebraska
- James Bryant House, Harris Crossroads, North Carolina, listed on the National Register of Historic Places in Moore County, North Carolina
- George Bryant House, Elyria, Ohio, listed on the National Register of Historic Places in Lorain County, Ohio
- Louis E. Bryant House, Oneida, Tennessee, listed on the National Register of Historic Places in Scott County, Tennessee
- William Bryant, Jr., House, Cedar Hill, Texas, listed on the National Register of Historic Places in Dallas County, Texas
