= Douglas F. Kelly =

American Presbyterian pastor

Douglas Floyd Kelly (born September 23, 1943) is a Presbyterian pastor, theologian and author. He was the Richard Jordan Professor of Theology at Reformed Theological Seminary for 33 years from 1982 to 2016. He is known for If God Already Knows, Why Pray? (1992), his translations of Calvin's Sermons on II Samuel (1989) and his three-volume Systematic Theology (2008, 2014, 2021).

== Education and academic career ==
Douglas F. Kelly was born in 1943 in Lumberton, North Carolina to Martha Pate Kelly and Floyd Ferguson Kelly while his father was in the army on the Western Front in France and Germany. He was an only child but spent the summers through university on the family farm in Carthage, North Carolina, which formation in family history would lead to two later publications: Carolina Scots: An Historical and Genealogical Study of Over 100 Years of Immigration (1998); and The Scottish Blue Family in North America. After completing high school at Lumberton High School, he entered the University of North Carolina in 1961. He received his B. A. in Classics in 1965, studying Latin, Greek, Hebrew, German, French and Gaelic. In his final year, he became part of UNC's first academic exchange with the University of Lyon, where he obtained a Diplome de Langue et de Civilisation Francaises.

Kelly returned to the U.S. to enter seminary at Union Theological Seminary in Richmond, Virginia, with a summer internship after his first year at First Presbyterian Church in Jackson, Mississippi, under Rev. John Reed Miller with the next two summers spent at Raeford Presbyterian Church in North Carolina. After completion of his M. Div. in 1968, he was awarded a one year academic scholarship from the St. Andrews Society of New York to pursue further theological studies at Edinburgh University from 1968 to 1969. After returning to Raeford the following year to initially work under Cortez Cooper (who was eventually called to First Presbyterian Church of Nashville), Kelly became the interim senior minister. When the Torrance brothers secured funding for further theological studies, he returned to Edinburgh from 1970 to 1973 where he completed his PhD studies in Patristics under Thomas F. Torrance, completing the first English translation with commentary of Novatian of Rome's De Trinitate. At the conclusion of his studies in 1973, he became engaged to fellow theological student Caroline Switzer of Cambridge, and they were married in Lumberton that same year.

Kelly took his first long term call as senior minister of First Presbyterian Church in Dillon, South Carolina where he remained from 1973 to 1981. From the Carolinas he and his then family of four children transitioned to Northern, CA where he had received funding for two years of translation work on John Calvin's Sermons on Second Samuel which he later published with Banner of Truth. From 1981 to 1983, he worked there with R.J. Rushdoony, editing the Journal of Christian Reconstruction, speaking domestically and internationally, and carrying on the translation work. During the end of his time in CA, he was called by Reformed Theological Seminary in Jackson, Mississippi, to be their Professor of Systematic Theology. With a fifth child recently born, the family returned to the South, where Dr. Kelly taught at the Jackson campus for the next 12 years, working with David F. Wright at the University of Edinburgh as editor-in-chief of Calvin's Old Testament commentary.

As Reformed Theological Seminary opened further extension campuses first in Orlando, Florida, then later in Charlotte, North Carolina, Kelly made weekly trips at different periods to each one as a visiting lecturer, ultimately transitioning to Charlotte in 1994, when Reformed Theological Seminary purchased the former Carmel Baptist Church as a full campus. He remained there as the Richard Jordan Professor of Theology until his retirement in 2016, and now holds the title of Professor of Theology Emeritus. In addition to full-time teaching as well as writing, he spent nearly every Sunday when he was in Jackson and later in Charlotte preaching. These churches included First Presbyterian Church (Young Seekers' Sunday School Class), Trinity Presbyterian in Jackson (interim), Second Presbyterian in Yazoo City (interim Wednesdays and Sunday evenings), Sovereign Grace in Charlotte (of which he was a founding member) and Reedy Creek Presbyterian Church in Minturn, SC.

== Family ==
Kelly is married to Caroline Switzer Kelly, the daughter of Jeffery Francis Quarry Switzer, a graduate of Royal Naval College Dartmouth. They have five children. Upon retirement, Kelly and his wife moved to Carthage, North Carolina, where they live in the Alexander Kelly House, built between 1836 and 1842 by the brother of Douglas's great-great grandfather.

== Bibliography ==
=== Collection ===
- Generation to Generation: Writings in Honor of Douglas F. Kelly. Edited by Matthew S. Miller and D. Blair Smith. (Mentor, 2023).

=== Books ===
- Systematic Theology, Vol 1: Grounded in Holy Scripture and Understood in the Light of the Church: The God Who Is: The Holy Trinity (Mentor, US 2009 & UK 2008)
- Systematic Theology, Vol 2: The Beauty of Christ - a Trinitarian Vision (Mentor, 2014)
- Systematic Theology, Vol 3: The Holy Spirit and the Church (Mentor, 2021)
- An English Translation of John Calvin's Sermons on II Samuel 1-13 (Banner of Truth, 1992)
- New Life in the Wasteland: 2 Corinthians on the Cost and Glory of Christian Ministry (Christian Focus, 2003)
- Revelation: A Mentor Expository Commentary (Mentor, 2015)
- Deuteronomy: A Mentor Expository Commentary (Mentor, 2022)
- If God Already Knows, Why Pray? (Wolgemuth & Hyatt, 1989)
- Creation and Change: Genesis 1:1-2:4 in the Light of Changing Scientific Paradigms (Mentor, 2003; Second revised and updated edition, 2017)
- Emergence of Liberty in the Modern World: Five Calvinist Governments from the 16th to 18th centuries (P&R, 1992)
- Preachers with Power: Four Stalwarts of the South (Banner of Truth, 1993)
- The Westminster Confession of Faith: An Authentic Modern Version [authored jointly with Professor Phil Rollinson and Dr. Hugh McClure] (P&R, 1986)
- The Westminster Shorter Catechism in Modern English (P&R, 1986)
- The Lord's Day in a Secular Society [authored with Graham Dickson] (Rutherford House, 1999)
- A Guide to the Westminster Confession of Faith: Commentary [authored jointly with John H. Gerstner and Phil Rollinson] (Summertown Texts, 1992)
- Carolina Scots: An Historical and Genealogical Study of Over 100 Years of Immigration (Seventeen Thirty Nine Publications, 1998)
- The Scottish Blue Family in North America (Seventeen Thirty Nine Publications, 2007)

=== Book chapters ===
- "A Theological Guide to Calvin's Institutes – Chapter 4: The True and Triune God: Calvin's Doctrine of the Holy Trinity" (P&R, 2008)
- "Worship in the Presence of God – Chapter 7: Family Worship: Biblical, Reformed, and Viable for Today" (Reformation Media & Press, 2006)

=== Articles ===
- "Cotton Mather on Raising Children". Banner of Truth Magazine, July 1976
- "1 Peter 2:13-15 – The Duty of the Christian to the Civil Government". Banner of Truth Magazine, 3 July 2015
- "A Response to the Decision of the C of S General Assembly". Banner of Truth Magazine. 23 May 2011
