= North Carolina Highway 690 =

State highway in North Carolina, US

North Carolina Highway 690

Route information
- Maintained by NCDOT
- Length: 19.3 mi (31.1 km)
- Existed: 1999–present

Major junctions
- West end: US 1 Bus. in Vass
- East end: NC 24 / NC 87 near Spring Lake

Location
- Country: United States
- State: North Carolina
- Counties: Moore, Cumberland

Highway system
- North Carolina Highway System; Interstate; US; State; Scenic
← NC 615	→ NC 694

North Carolina Highway 690 (NC 690) is a primary state highway in the U.S. state of North Carolina. The highway runs east–west, connecting the cities of Vass and Spring Lake.

== Route description ==
NC 690 is a 19.3-mile (31.1 km) two-lane rural highway that begins in Vass and ends near Spring Lake. The highway passes through mostly forest and farmland, some of which within the confines of Fort Bragg, with the Woodlake private gated community just five miles (8.0 km) east of Vass.

== History ==
Established in 1999 as a new primary route, it has not changed since then.

== Junction list ==
County	Location	mi	km	Destinations	Notes
Moore	Vass	0.0	0.0	US 1 Bus. – Cameron	
Moore	Vass	0.7	1.1	US 1 – Southern Pines, Sanford	
Cumberland	Spring Lake	19.3	31.1	NC 24 / NC 87 (Bragg Boulevard) – Sanford, Cameron, Fayetteville	
1.000 mi = 1.609 km; 1.000 km = 0.621 mi
