= Carthage Historic District =

Carthage Historic District may refer to the following places:

- Carthage Historic District (Carthage, Mississippi), listed on the National Register of Historic Places
- Carthage Historic District (Carthage, North Carolina), listed on the National Register of Historic Places
