= Aberdeen Historic District (Aberdeen, North Carolina) =

Historic district in North Carolina, United States

- U.S. National Register of Historic Places
- U.S. Historic district
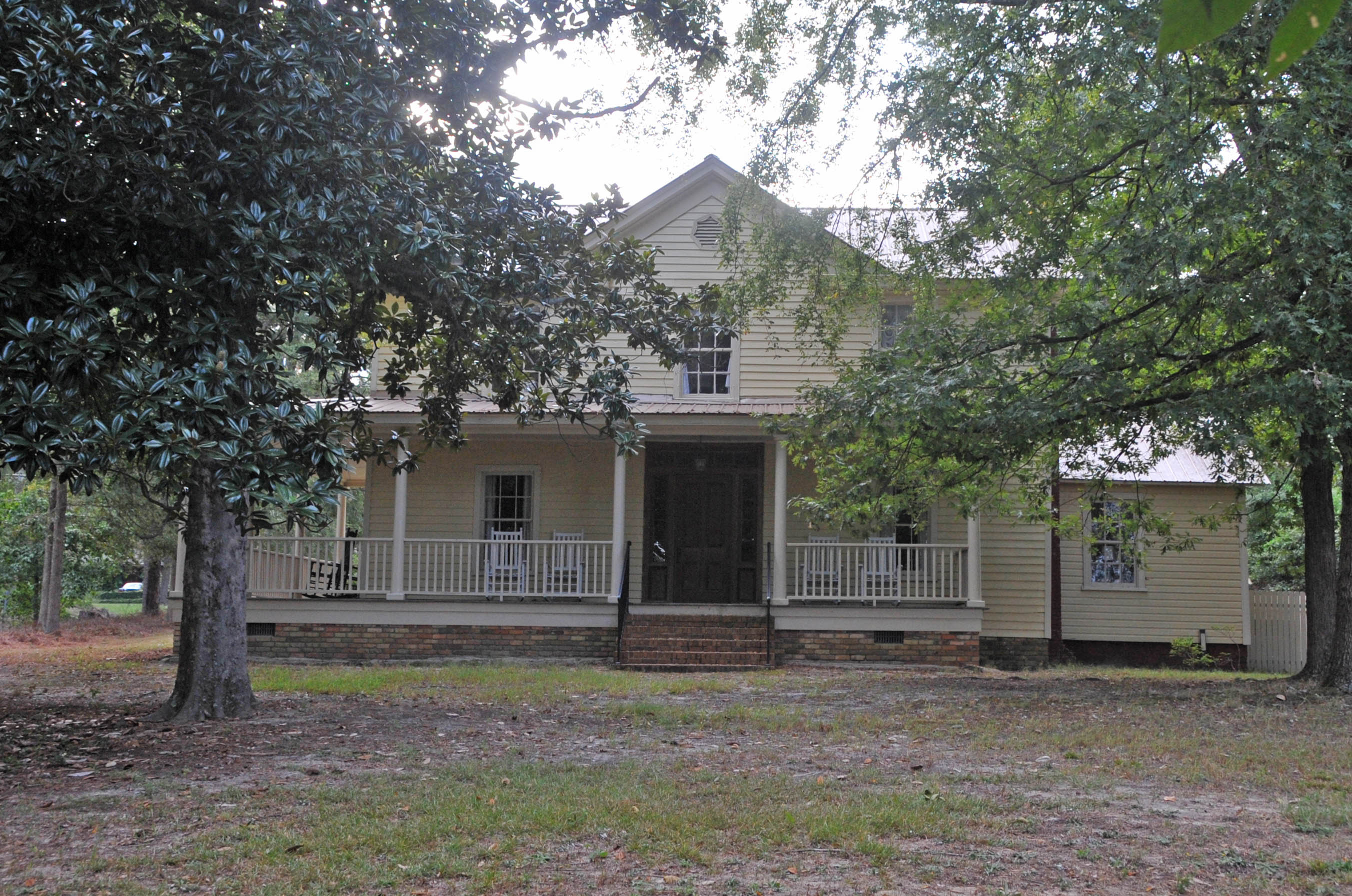
- Postmaster's House (c. 1880), Aberdeen Historic District, March 2007

- Location within North Carolina Location within the United States
- Location: Roughly bounded by Maple Ave., Bethesda Ave., Campbell St., Main St., Pine St., South St., and Poplar St., Aberdeen, North Carolina
- Coordinates: 35°07′53″N 79°25′29″W
- Area: 87 acres (35 ha)
- Built: 1877
- Built by: Creel, T.B.; Hook, C.C.
- Architectural style: Classical Revival, Bungalow/craftsman, Queen Anne
- NRHP reference No.: 89000663
- Added to NRHP: June 28, 1989

Aberdeen Historic District is a national historic district located at Aberdeen, Moore County, North Carolina. The district encompasses 101 contributing buildings, 1 contributing site, and 2 contributing structures in the town of Aberdeen. It was developed between 1880 and 1940 and includes notable examples of Queen Anne, Classical Revival, and Bungalow / American Craftsman style architecture. Located in the district is the separately listed John Blue House. Other notable buildings include the Postmaster's House (c. 1880), Aberdeen and Asheboro Railroad Building (c. 1906), Page Memorial Library (1907), (former) Union Station (1906), Aberdeen and Rockfish Railroad Building (1904), Bank of Aberdeen, Page Memorial United Methodist Church (1913), (former) Bethesda Presbyterian Church (1906-1907), and Faith Presbyterian Church (c. 1890).

It was added to the National Register of Historic Places in 1989.
