= Philips House =

Philips House may refer to:

- McConnell-Woodson-Philips House, Nicholasville, Kentucky, listed on the National Register of Historic Places (NRHP) in Jessamine County
- Bellamy-Philips House, also known as Oak Forest Plantation, near Battleboro, Nash County, North Carolina
- Hardman Philips House, also known as Moshannon Hall and Halehurst, a historic home located at Philipsburg, Centre County, Pennsylvania

== See also ==
- Philips-Thompson Buildings, Wilmington, Delaware, NRHP-listed
- Phillips House (disambiguation)
