= Lucean Arthur Headen =

American aviator, inventor, and entrepreneur

- Born: 26 August 1879; Carthage, North Carolina
- Died: 17 September 1957 (age 78); Frimley Green, Surrey
- Occupations: Inventor, engineer

Lucean Arthur Headen (26 August 1879 – 17 September 1957) was an American aviator, inventor, and entrepreneur. An early African-American barnstormer in the 1910s, he later co-founded the first United States-wide African-American automobile racing association, the African-American Automobile Association, and founded companies in the United States and England.

== Life and career ==
Headen was born in 1879 on his grandparents' farm in Carthage, North Carolina, which became a manufacturing center after the arrival of the railroad in 1888; his grandfather was a wheelright, his great-uncle was a blacksmith, and his father and uncle started a sawmill in 1893. Initially prevented from receiving further training in mechanics after finishing school at Dayton Industrial and Normal School in 1898, he became a porter for the Pullman Company before enrolling in Albion Academy in Franklinton, where he graduated in 1903. He then returned to Pullman in 1904, in 1909 transferring to the Erie Railroad as a dining car waiter, working 6–8 months a year and using the rest to work on inventions. In the mid-1900s he moved with his wife to Jersey City, New Jersey.

One of Headen's first inventions was a cover for ash carts. In 1910, he invented an automatic stabilizer to allow aircraft to remain level in flight after banking; he does not appear to have applied for a patent for either invention.

In 1911, he took flying lessons at the Aeronautical Society in Mineola, New York, and in January the following year, he left his job to accompany his instructor (probably François Raiche) on a barnstorming tour. He displayed a medal inscribed "First Negro Licensed Aviator in the World", but like many early flyers, did not take the examination for a certificate from the Aero Club of America. The tour led him to relocate to Chicago, but he was refused membership in the Aero Club of Illinois because of his race. He performed a number of exhibition flights throughout the Midwest, although he failed to appear for a scheduled racing car–airplane race against the first Black world heavyweight boxing champion, Jack Johnson.

In 1914, Headen ended his barnstorming career, working part-time for a patent lawyer and also as a chauffeur to Robert R. McCormick, publisher of the Chicago Tribune. In 1915 he sought to patent a "spring inner tube" for automobile tires, and in 1916 incorporated the Headen Spring-in-a-Tube Company. In 1916–17 he then developed a system of mirrors as a cloaking device to protect ships from U-boat activity during World War I. His system was turned down by the United States Navy, and the war ended before the Royal Navy, which had expressed interest, could implement it.

In the postwar years, Headen shifted his attention to automobiles. In 1919 he opened the Headen Repair Shop in Chicago, although an attempt to raise money to do so by bootlegging led to two months in prison in Detroit. Profits from the garage enabled him in 1921 to start the Headen Motor Company, the first United States car company producing vehicles entirely designed by an African-American: by 1924 its products included a touring car, a sports roadster, and a race car. He toured widely to promote the company and solicit investments, and began to appeal to Black pride and to argue that the automobile would help to alleviate segregation; in 1924 he co-founded the Afro-American Automobile Association, the first nationwide Black auto club, although he was ousted from it later that year, largely over his focus on auto racing.

From 1925 to 1930, Headen lived in Albany, Georgia, where he incorporated the Headen Motor Car Company, which assembled cars, repaired and serviced cars, motorcycles, and tractors, and sold accessories. In 1930 he and associate Henry Petit, a locomotive engineer, were granted Headen's first patent, for an ignition device. With Petit, he also developed a fuel-saving vaporizing manifold, for which he was granted a sole British patent in 1933 and a sole U.S. patent in 1935; National Oil Manifolds was incorporated to market it.

After being invited to present his manifold in London, Headen emigrated in 1931 to the United Kingdom, co-founding and running Headen Hamilton Engineering Ltd., later Headen Keil Engineering Company Ltd., with a factory in Camberley. His inventions and products included a piping system to prevent engine damage from premature ignition, a kit to convert engines to run heavier fuels using his manifold (secretly used by farmers during World War II to run their cars on kerosene in circumvention of petrol restrictions), and a gasket to protect bi-fuel engines from crankcase dilution by unburned fuel, which he adapted for use in planes. He also patented a "pressure-jet" method of de-icing plane engines that influenced later inventors. In 1940, Headen joined the 1st Battalion of the Surrey Home Guard, and he reportedly lent his boat for the Dunkirk evacuation.

Headen initially lived in Camberley, but after his marriage settled near his wife's relatives in the village of Frimley Green, where he died of a heart attack in 1957.

== Personal life ==
Headen's older sister Nannie was an educator who became house directress at North Carolina College in 1940.

In 1903, Headen married Tena Drye, who taught primary school at Albion, had been an executive of her father's charity, and was active in the Presbyterian Church. She remained in Chicago when he moved to Albany, and in 1929 divorced him and remarried. In 1943 Headen remarried, to Gladys Hollamby; they adopted a son, Lucean Jr., in 1948.
