= Gordon Payne Site =

- Gordon Payne Site (31MR15)
- U.S. National Register of Historic Places
- Nearest city: High Falls, North Carolina
- Area: 1.5 acres (0.61 ha)
- NRHP reference No.: 86001954
- Added to NRHP: September 24, 1986

The Gordon Payne Site, designated by the Smithsonian trinomial 31MR15, is a prehistoric archaeological site in northern Moore County, North Carolina. Located on a terrace above the Deep River, it is a habitation site whose artifacts have yielded dates of 1060-1100 CE. Large numbers of cultural remains were excavated in the 1970s and 1980s, that are consistent with the Pee Dee culture, whose center is believed to be the Town Creek Indian Mound, about 30 miles (48 km) away in Montgomery County.

The site was listed on the National Register of Historic Places in 1986.

== See also ==
- National Register of Historic Places listings in Moore County, North Carolina
