= Cameron Historic District =

Historic district in North Carolina, United States

- U.S. National Register of Historic Places
- U.S. Historic district
- Location within North Carolina Location within the United States
- Location: Carthage St. from US 1 to Seaboard RR Tracks, Cameron, North Carolina
- Coordinates: 35°19′36″N 79°15′28″W
- Area: 54 acres (22 ha)
- Architectural style: Bungalow/craftsman, Late Victorian
- NRHP reference No.: 83001898
- Added to NRHP: March 17, 1983

Cameron Historic District is a national historic district located at Cameron, Moore County, North Carolina. The district encompasses 61 contributing buildings in the town of Cameron. It was developed between 1875 and 1925 and includes notable examples of Late Victorian and Bungalow / American Craftsman style architecture. Notable buildings include the Cameron Presbyterian Church (c. 1879), Murdock McKeithen House (c. 1885), John C. Muse House (c. 1878), McLean House (c. 1920), McFadyen House (c. 1878), Rodwell House (c. 1890s), Muse Brothers Store (c. 1880s), McKeithen Store (c. 1880s), Greenwood Inn (c. 1874), Cameron Methodist Church (c. 1886), L. B. McKeithen House (1923), Borst House (c. 1883), Parker House (c. 1918), and Turner-McPerson House (c. 1867, 1910s).

It was added to the National Register of Historic Places in 1983.
