= Pinebluff, North Carolina =

- Town
- Pinebluff Town Hall

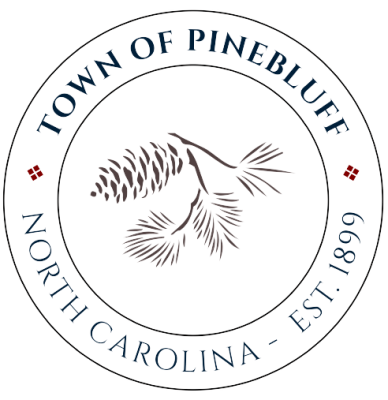
- Seal

- Location in Moore County and the state of North Carolina
- Coordinates: 35°06′32″N 79°28′17″W
- Country: United States
- State: North Carolina
- County: Moore

Government
  - Mayor: Ronald McDonald

Area
  - Total: 2.64 sq mi (6.85 km^{2})
  - Land: 2.61 sq mi (6.77 km^{2})
  - Water: 0.027 sq mi (0.07 km^{2})
- Elevation: 413 ft (126 m)

Population (2020)
  - Total: 1,473
  - Density: 563.1/sq mi (217.42/km^{2})
- Time zone: UTC-5 (Eastern (EST))
  - Summer (DST): UTC-4 (EDT)
- ZIP Code: 28373
- Area codes: 910, 472
- FIPS code: 37-51840
- GNIS feature ID: 2407121
- Website: townofpinebluffnc.org

Pinebluff is a town in Moore County, North Carolina, United States. The population was 1,473 at the 2020 census, up from 1,337 in 2010.

== History ==
Pinebluff was a regional resort area during the early 20th century and was more renowned than Pinehurst Resort at the time. After an uncontrollable fire, the town was permanently damaged, and it is currently a small residential area. As of 1909, Pinebluff was a sundown town, where African Americans were not allowed to live or stay overnight. At the southern end of the town, a lakeside park called Cardinal Park offered a small lake beach and summer-time water-sport recreation to African Americans despite the rest of the town being closed to them at the time in 1962. The park has since reopened in 2019 to the public after being closed for several years.

The Lincoln Park School and McLeod Family Rural Complex are listed on the National Register of Historic Places.

== Geography ==
Pinebluff is in southern Moore County within the Sandhills region of North Carolina. U.S. Route 1 passes through the town as Walnut Street, leading northeast 3 miles (5 km) to Aberdeen and 6 miles (10 km) to Southern Pines, and southwest 23 miles (37 km) to Rockingham. Pinehurst is 7 miles (11 km) to the north via local roads.

According to the U.S. Census Bureau, the town of Pinebluff has a total area of 2.64 square miles (6.84 km^{2}), of which 0.03 square miles (0.08 km^{2}), or 1.06%, are water. Aberdeen Creek forms the southeast border of the town. It is a southwest-flowing tributary of Drowning Creek, the name for the headwaters of the Lumber River.

== Demographics ==
Historical population
Census	Pop.	Note	%±
1910	92		—
1920	165		79.3%
1930	289		75.2%
1940	330		14.2%
1950	575		74.2%
1960	509		−11.5%
1970	570		12.0%
1980	935		64.0%
1990	876		−6.3%
2000	1,109		26.6%
2010	1,337		20.6%
2020	1,473		10.2%
U.S. Decennial Census

=== 2020 census ===
Pinebluff racial composition
Race	Number	Percentage
White (non-Hispanic)	1,071	72.71%
Black or African American (non-Hispanic)	211	14.32%
Native American	15	1.02%
Asian	25	1.7%
Pacific Islander	2	0.14%
Other/Mixed	61	4.14%
Hispanic or Latino	88	5.97%

As of the 2020 United States census, 1,473 people lived in the town, comprising 663 households and 464 families.

=== 2000 census ===
As of the census of 2000, there were 1,109 people, 449 households, and 315 families residing in the town. The population density was 464.5 inhabitants per square mile (179.3/km^{2}). There were 481 housing units at an average density of 201.5 per square mile (77.8/km^{2}). The racial makeup of the town was 89.54% White, 7.39% African American, 0.72% Native American, 0.54% Asian, 0.72% from other races, and 1.08% from two or more races. Hispanic or Latino of any race were 1.17% of the population.

There were 449 households, out of which 33.0% had children under the age of 18 living with them, 56.6% were married couples living together, 11.1% had a female householder with no husband present, and 29.8% were non-families. 25.4% of all households were made up of individuals, and 7.8% had someone living alone who was 65 years of age or older. The average household size was 2.47 and the average family size was 2.97.

In the town, the population was spread out, with 25.2% under the age of 18, 6.4% from 18 to 24, 33.6% from 25 to 44, 24.8% from 45 to 64, and 10.0% who were 65 years of age or older. The median age was 35 years. For every 100 females, there were 90.9 males. For every 100 females age 18 and over, there were 90.4 males.

The median income for a household in the town was $40,536, and the median income for a family was $47,500. Males had a median income of $30,813 versus $24,167 for females. The per capita income for the town was $18,786. About 8.7% of families and 9.5% of the population were below the poverty line, including 14.9% of those under age 18 and 5.5% of those age 65 or over.

== See also ==
- List of sundown towns in the United States
