= Lakeview, Moore County, North Carolina =

Lakeview, North Carolina
- Unincorporated community
- Location within North Carolina Location within the United States
- Coordinates: 35°14′38″N 79°18′31″W
- Country: United States
- State: North Carolina
- County: Moore
- Elevation: 308 ft (94 m)
- Time zone: UTC-5 (Eastern (EST))
  - Summer (DST): UTC-4 (EDT)
- ZIP code: 28350
- Area codes: 910, 472
- GNIS feature ID: 988095

Lakeview is an unincorporated community in Moore County, North Carolina, United States. The community is located on Crystal Lake along the north side of U.S. Route 1, 1.7 miles (2.7 km) southwest of Vass. Lakeview has a post office with ZIP code 28350.

The Lakeview Historic District was added to the National Register of Historic Places in 2000.
