= Daniel Blue House =

Historic house in North Carolina, United States

- U.S. National Register of Historic Places
- Location within North Carolina Location within the United States
- Location: SR 1836, near Carthage, North Carolina
- Coordinates: 35°16′55″N 79°25′32″W
- Area: 178 acres (72 ha)
- Built: 1795
- NRHP reference No.: 83001897
- Added to NRHP: July 21, 1983

"River Daniel" Blue House, also known as Highlanders Farm, is a historic home located near Carthage, Moore County, North Carolina. It was built about 1795, and is a two-story, gable-roof log house sheathed in weatherboard. The house has two gable-end single, stepped-shoulder brick chimneys. Also on the property are the contributing "old kitchen," one-room log structure, and rail depot.

It was added to the National Register of Historic Places in 1983.
