= J.C. Black House =

Historic house in North Carolina, United States

- U.S. National Register of Historic Places
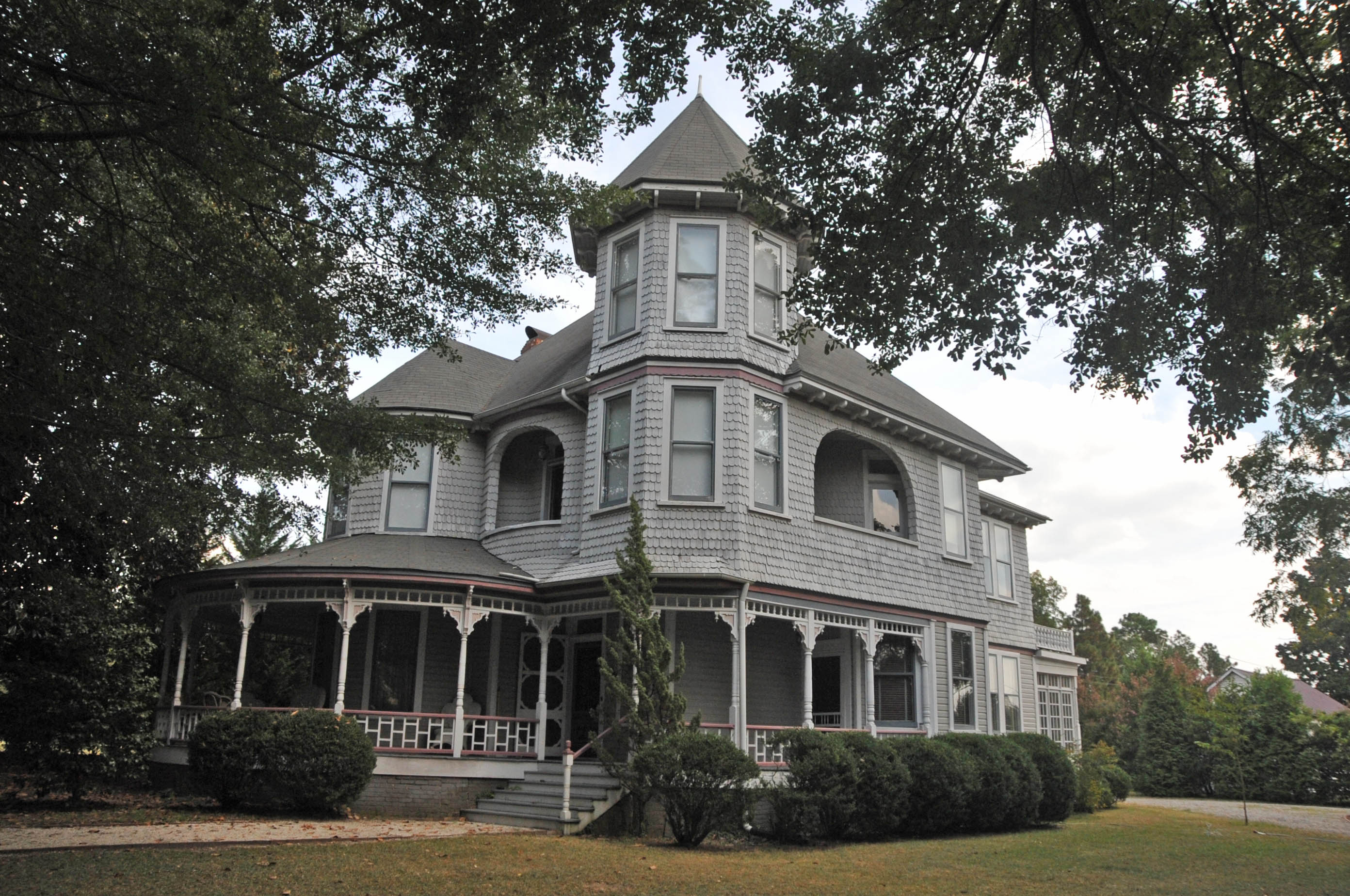
- J.C. Black House, March 2007

- Location within North Carolina Location within the United States
- Location: 106 McNeill St., Carthage, North Carolina
- Coordinates: 35°20′44″N 79°24′55″W
- Area: less than one acre
- Built: 1893
- Built by: Cameron Bros.
- Architectural style: Queen Anne
- NRHP reference No.: 99000811
- Added to NRHP: July 8, 1999

J.C. Black House is a historic home located at Carthage, Moore County, North Carolina. It was built in 1893, and is a large two-story, rectangular Queen Anne style frame dwelling. It sits on a brick foundation and has a hipped roof. It features a three-story, polygonal corner tower, recessed balcony, round two-story bay, and a front porch with decorative sawnwork, turned brackets, and a spindle frieze. Also on the property is a contributing fanciful, polygonal well house.

It was added to the National Register of Historic Places in 1999.
