= Malcolm Blue Farm =

Historic home and farm in Aberdeen, Moore County, North Carolina, United States

- U.S. National Register of Historic Places
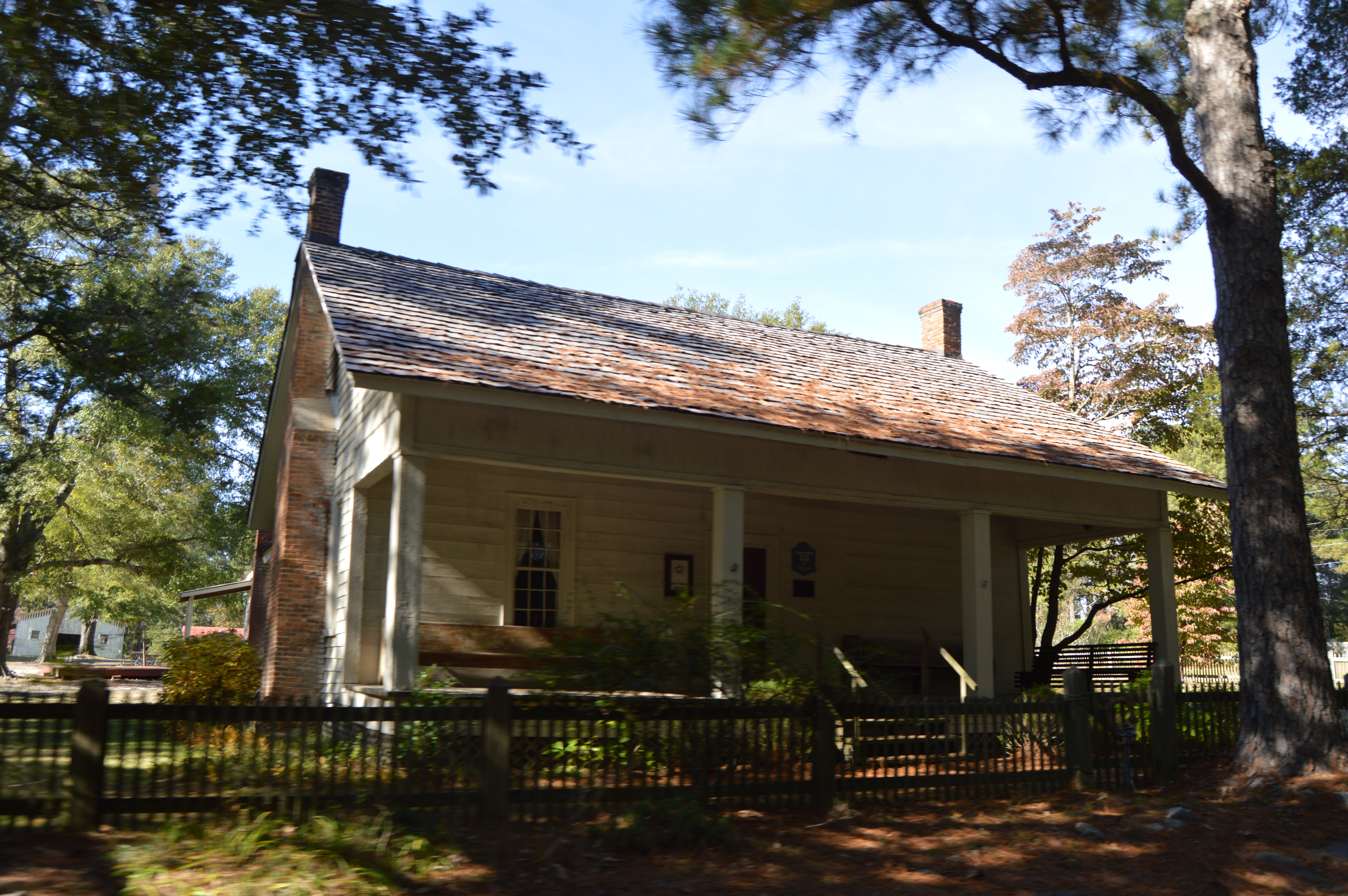
- Front of the farmhouse

- Location within North Carolina Location within the United States
- Location: Bethesda Rd. and Ernest L. Ives Dr., Aberdeen, North Carolina
- Coordinates: 35°8′8″N 79°24′38″W
- Area: 3.5 acres (1.4 ha)
- Built: 1825
- Architectural style: Greek Revival, Federal
- NRHP reference No.: 82003489
- Added to NRHP: June 1, 1982

Malcolm Blue Farm is a historic home and farm in Aberdeen, Moore County, North Carolina. The house is believed to date to 1825, and is a one-story, three-bay, frame structure with a simple gable roof and vernacular Federal and Greek Revival style design elements. It has a rear ell and full-width front porch. Also on the property are the contributing four small barns, packhouse, well, horse barns, building originally used as a grist mill, and wooden water tower. The property is open to the public as a farm museum.

It was added to the National Register of Historic Places in 1982.
