= McLeod Family Rural Complex =

Historic farm in North Carolina, United States

- U.S. National Register of Historic Places
- U.S. Historic district
- Location within North Carolina Location within the United States
- Nearest city: .4 miles west of US 1, near Pine Bluff, North Carolina
- Coordinates: 35°04′33″N 79°30′06″W
- Area: 225 acres (91 ha)
- Built: c. 1840, 1884
- Built by: Rosy, Joseph
- NRHP reference No.: 84000561
- Added to NRHP: December 20, 1984

The McLeod Family Rural Complex is a historic farm and national historic district located near Pine Bluff, Moore County, North Carolina, United States. The district encompasses 10 contributing buildings, 1 contributing site, and 3 contributing structures on a family farm established in the mid-19th century. It includes two houses: the John McLeod House, a largely intact, 1 1/2-story, frame dogtrot plan house dated to about 1840. The Alex McLeod House, built in 1884, is a two-story, five-bay, traditional frame farmhouse. Other contributing resources include two tobacco barns, a packing house, a fertilizer house, a barn with stables, a corn crib, a saddle-notched log house (c. 1865), a chicken house, a shed, a root cellar, and a smokehouse.

It was added to the National Register of Historic Places in 1984.
