= Lincoln Park School (Pinebluff, North Carolina) =

Historic school building in North Carolina, United States

- U.S. National Register of Historic Places
- Location within North Carolina Location within the United States
- Location: 1272 S. Currant St., near Pinebluff, North Carolina
- Coordinates: 35°5′6″N 79°28′25″W
- Area: 2.1 acres (0.85 ha)
- Built: 1922
- Architect: Rosenwald, The Julius, Fund
- Architectural style: Bungalow/craftsman
- NRHP reference No.: 97000167
- Added to NRHP: February 27, 1997

Lincoln Park School, also known as Addor Community Center, is a historic Rosenwald School located near Pinebluff, Moore County, North Carolina. It was built in 1922, and is a one-story, four bay by three bay, side-gabled, weatherboarded, rectangular building in the Bungalow / American Craftsman style. It was built as a four teacher school. It was decommissioned as a school in 1949, and the building serves as the Addor Community Center.

It was added to the National Register of Historic Places in 1997.
