= Moore County Courthouse =

- U.S. National Register of Historic Places
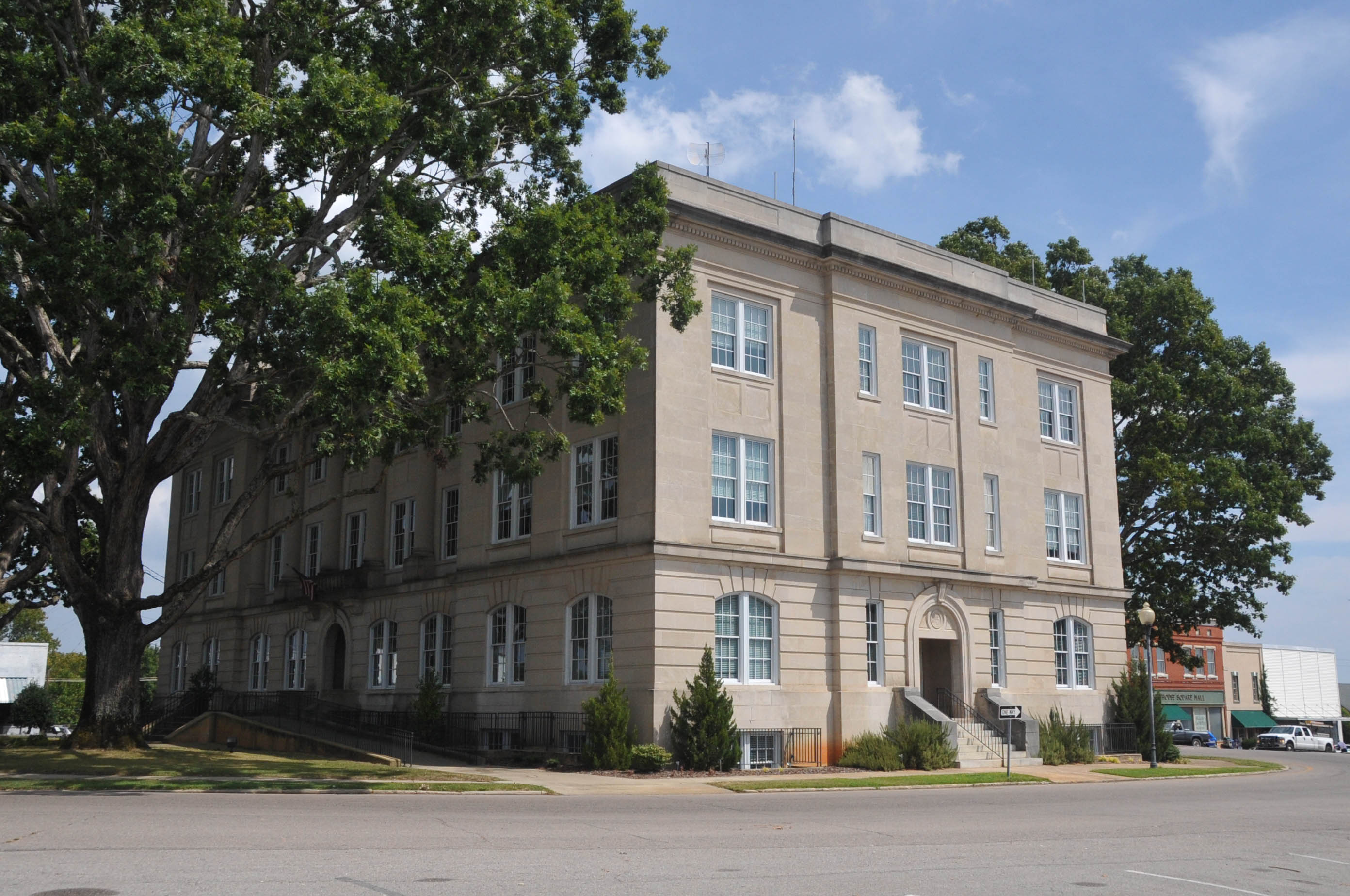
- Moore County Courthouse, March 2007

- Location within North Carolina Location within the United States
- Location: Ray, Dowd, Monroe, and Sanders Sts. circle, Carthage, North Carolina
- Coordinates: 35°20′44″N 79°25′0″W
- Area: less than one acre
- Built: 1922-1923
- Architect: Sayre, Christopher Gadsen
- Architectural style: Renaissance
- MPS: North Carolina County Courthouses TR
- NRHP reference No.: 79001738
- Added to NRHP: May 10, 1979

Moore County Courthouse is a historic courthouse located at Carthage, Moore County, North Carolina. It was built in 1922–1923, and is a three-story, rectangular, limestone-faced building in the Renaissance Revival style. It has a rusticated base pierced by arched paired windows, upper floor windows divided by pilasters, and a series of Ionic order half columns in the slightly recessed central section.

It was added to the National Register of Historic Places in 1979.
