= E.M. Phillips House =

Historic house in Massachusetts, United States

- E. M. Phillips House
- U.S. National Register of Historic Places
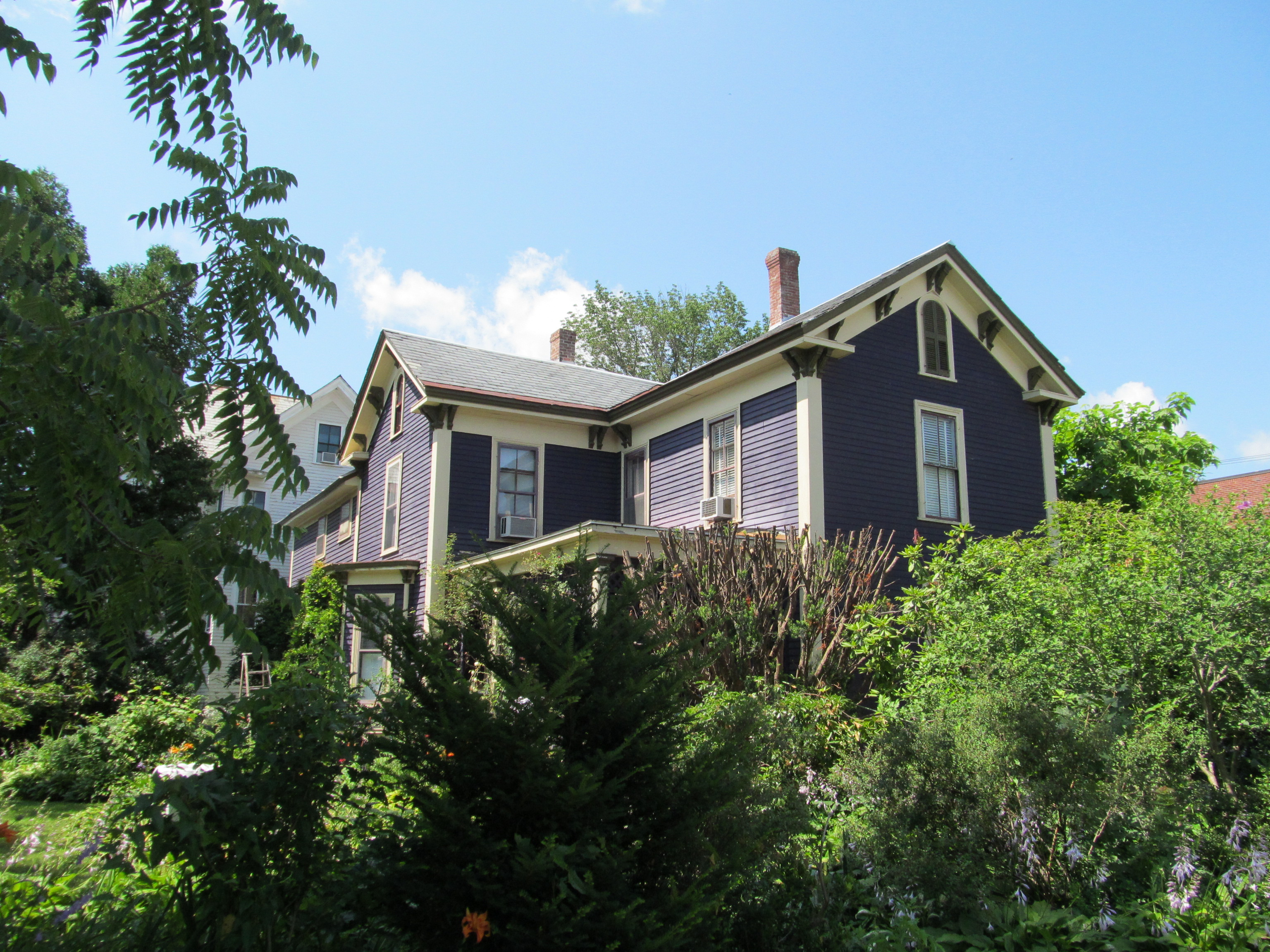
- E.M. Phillips House

- Location within Massachusetts Location within the United States
- Location: 35 Dresser St., Southbridge, Massachusetts
- Coordinates: 42°4′25″N 72°2′12″W
- Built: 1871
- Architectural style: Italianate
- MPS: Southbridge MRA
- NRHP reference No.: 89000532
- Added to NRHP: June 22, 1989

The E. M. Phillips House is a historic house at 35 Dresser Street in Southbridge, Massachusetts. The two story L-shaped house was built in 1871 for E. M. Phillips, a local insurance agent. Its styling is Italianate: its main body is three window bays wide, there are brackets in the eaves and gable pitch, and the gables have small round-arch windows. After Phillips, the house was briefly occupied by Herbert E. Wells, son of Hiram C. Wells, owner of the locally important American Optical Company. The company later acquired the house and used it as employee housing.

The house was listed on the National Register of Historic Places in 1989.

== See also ==
- National Register of Historic Places listings in Southbridge, Massachusetts
- National Register of Historic Places listings in Worcester County, Massachusetts
