= John Evander Phillips House =

Historic house in North Carolina, United States

- U.S. National Register of Historic Places
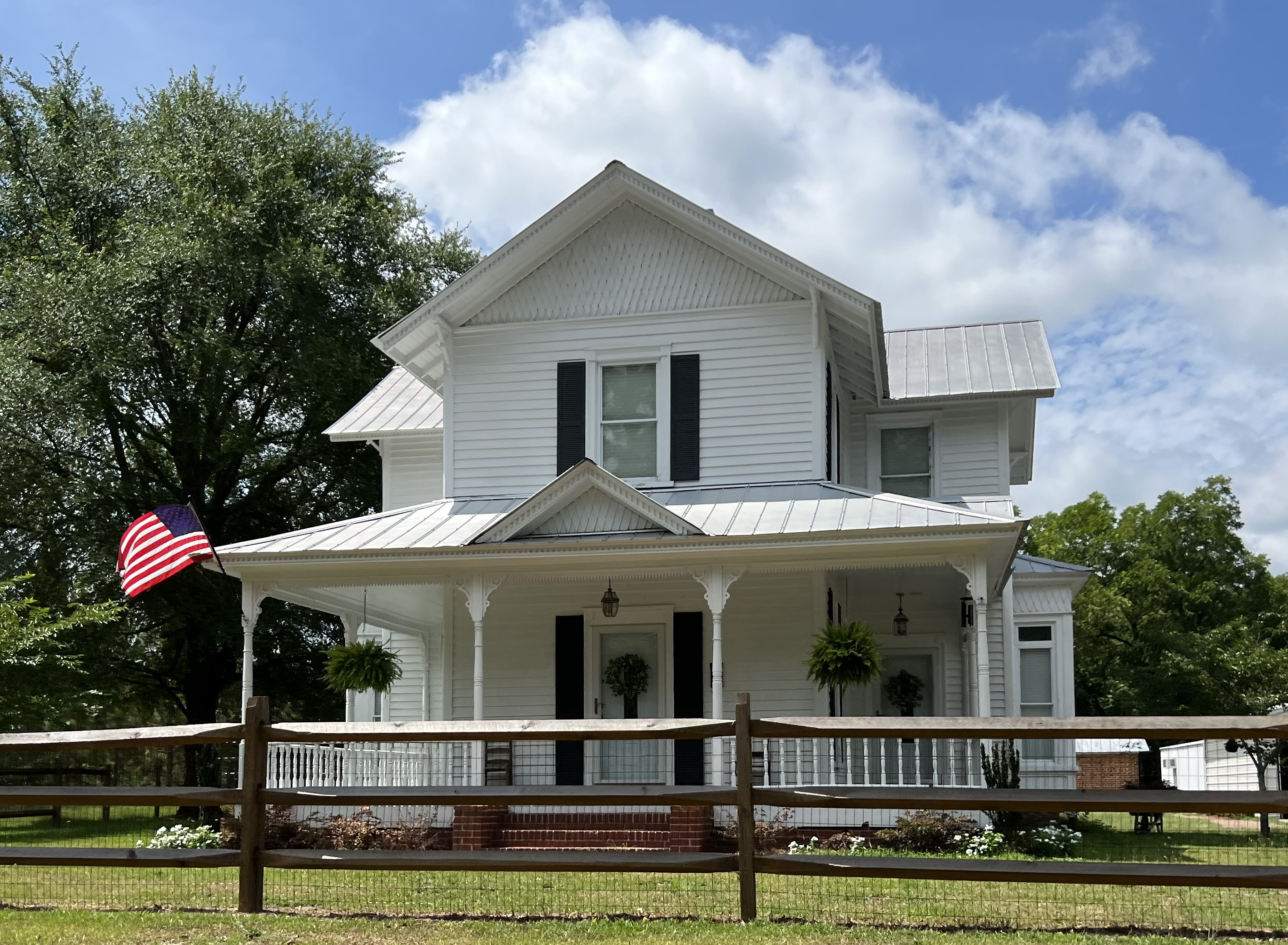

- Location within North Carolina Location within the United States
- Location: NC 24/27, 0.3 mi outside Cameron, near Cameron, North Carolina
- Coordinates: 35°19′47″N 79°15′45″W
- Area: 1.4 acres (0.57 ha)
- Built: 1893
- Architectural style: Late Victorian
- NRHP reference No.: 00001184
- Added to NRHP: October 6, 2000

John Evander Phillips House is a historic home located near Cameron, Moore County, North Carolina. It was built in 1893, and is a two-story, cruciform plan, frame farmhouse with Late Victorian style decorative elements. The front facade features wraparound porch. A breezeway at the rear of the dwelling, enclosed before 1937, joins the main block to a late 18th-century kitchen house. Also on the property is a contributing brick cider house (c. 1893).

It was added to the National Register of Historic Places in 2000.
