= James and Anne Atmore Bryant Farmstead =

- U.S. National Register of Historic Places
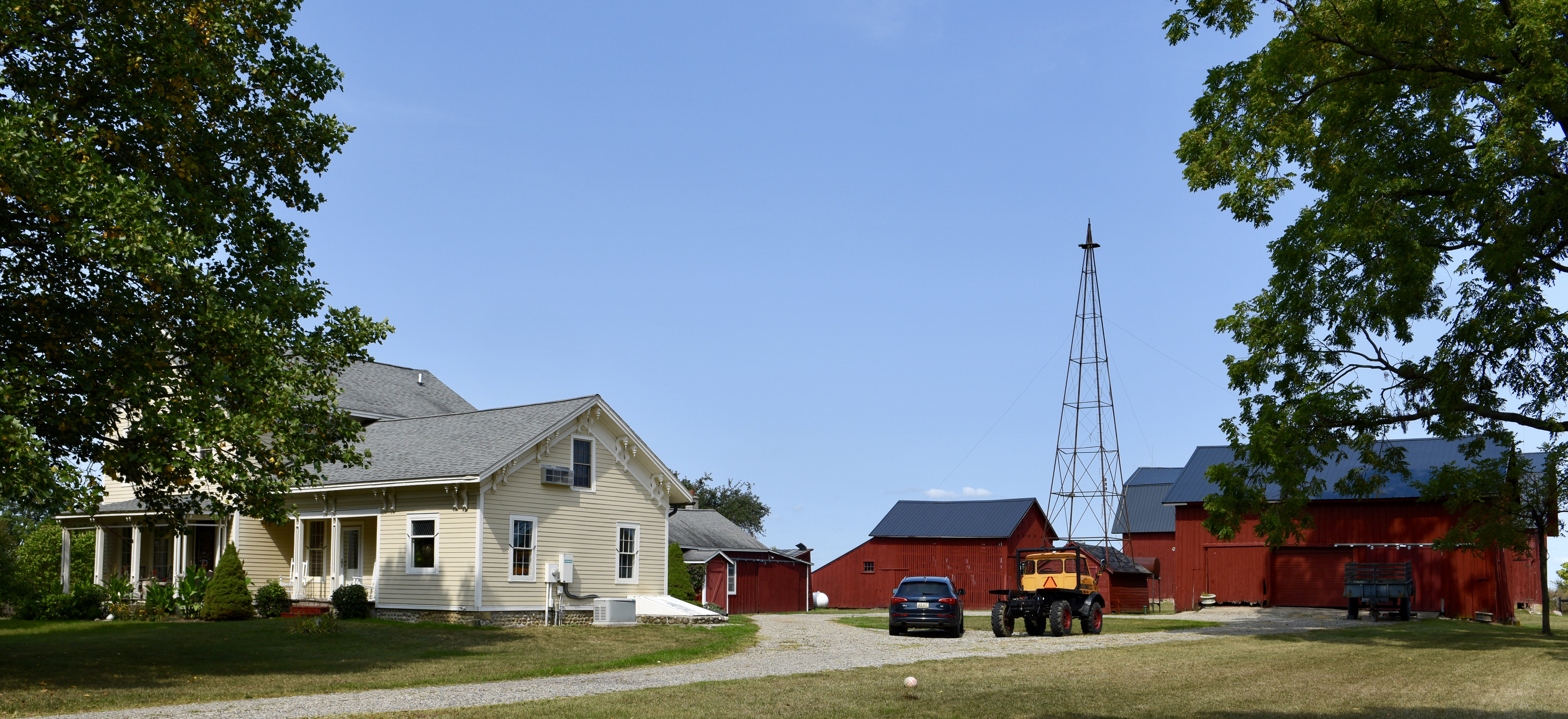
- Interactive map
- Location: 12557 L Dr. N., Convis Township, Michigan
- Coordinates: 42°20′01″N 85°03′05″W
- Area: 13.5 acres (5.5 ha)
- Built: 1855
- Architectural style: Greek Revival
- NRHP reference No.: 02000667
- Added to NRHP: June 20, 2002

The James and Anne Atmore Bryant Farmstead is a farm located at 12557 L Drive North in Convis Township, Michigan. It was listed on the National Register of Historic Places in 2002.

== History ==
This property was initially purchased by Patrick Clark in 1835. It passed through multiple owners until 1844, when it was purchased by James Bryant. James Bryant was born in England in 1818, and emigrated with his parents to America, where the family settled near Hickory Corners, Michigan. Bryant married Dorcas Ann Joy in early 1842, and moved to Pennfield Charter Township, Michigan, just west of this farm. However, Dorcas Bryant died in November 1842. In 1844, James Bryant married Anne Atmore, who was born in 1821–1905 in Norfolk, England. Bryant built a log cabin on this property, and the couple moved to the new farm in 1845. The Bryants built a number of other buildings over the years, including a new frame house in about 1855. They also purchased surrounding acreage to increase the size of the farm to about 160 acres. The farm was diversified, with livestock including cattle, milk cows, horses, oxen, sheep, and pigs, as well as crops including wheat, com, oats, potatoes, buckwheat, and hay. In the latter part of the 19th century, the farm produced a surplus, specifically concentrating on wool.

James Bryant continued farming until his death in 1893. At that time, his second son, Myron J. Bryant, and his wife, Georgiana Chisholm Bryant, bought the entire farm from his brothers and sisters. Myron shifted the farm to a dairy operation, and operated it until his own death in 1925. Myron's second son Joseph lived on the farm his entire life, and continued operating the farm. After Georgiana Bryant's death in 1941, Joseph and his wife Winifred Ashley Bryant purchased the farm from the other heirs. He continued operating the farm until the 1960s, when his son James took over. In about 1980, James Bryant began leasing the land to other farmers. James Bryant died in 1997 and the farm passed to his nephews, Kenneth and Richard Wirtz.

== Description ==
The Bryant Farmstead covers about a 13-acre portion of the property. It contains a c. 1855 farmhouse, a small orchard, and associated agricultural outbuildings, including two barns, two silos, two corn cribs, a pump house, and washhouse. The farmhouse is a two-story, post-and-beam Upright and Wing structure containing combinations of Greek Revival and Italianate elements. The upright section is three bays wide with a cobblestone foundation and clapboard siding. A hip-roof porch spans the front of the upright, covering a main entry door flanked by sidelights and two French doors. The original wing also has a cobblestone foundation and clapboard siding, and contains two recessed porches. A secondary wing, constructed in about 1900, is attached to the other side of the house.
