= Bruce–Dowd–Kennedy House =

Historic house in North Carolina, United States

- U.S. National Register of Historic Places
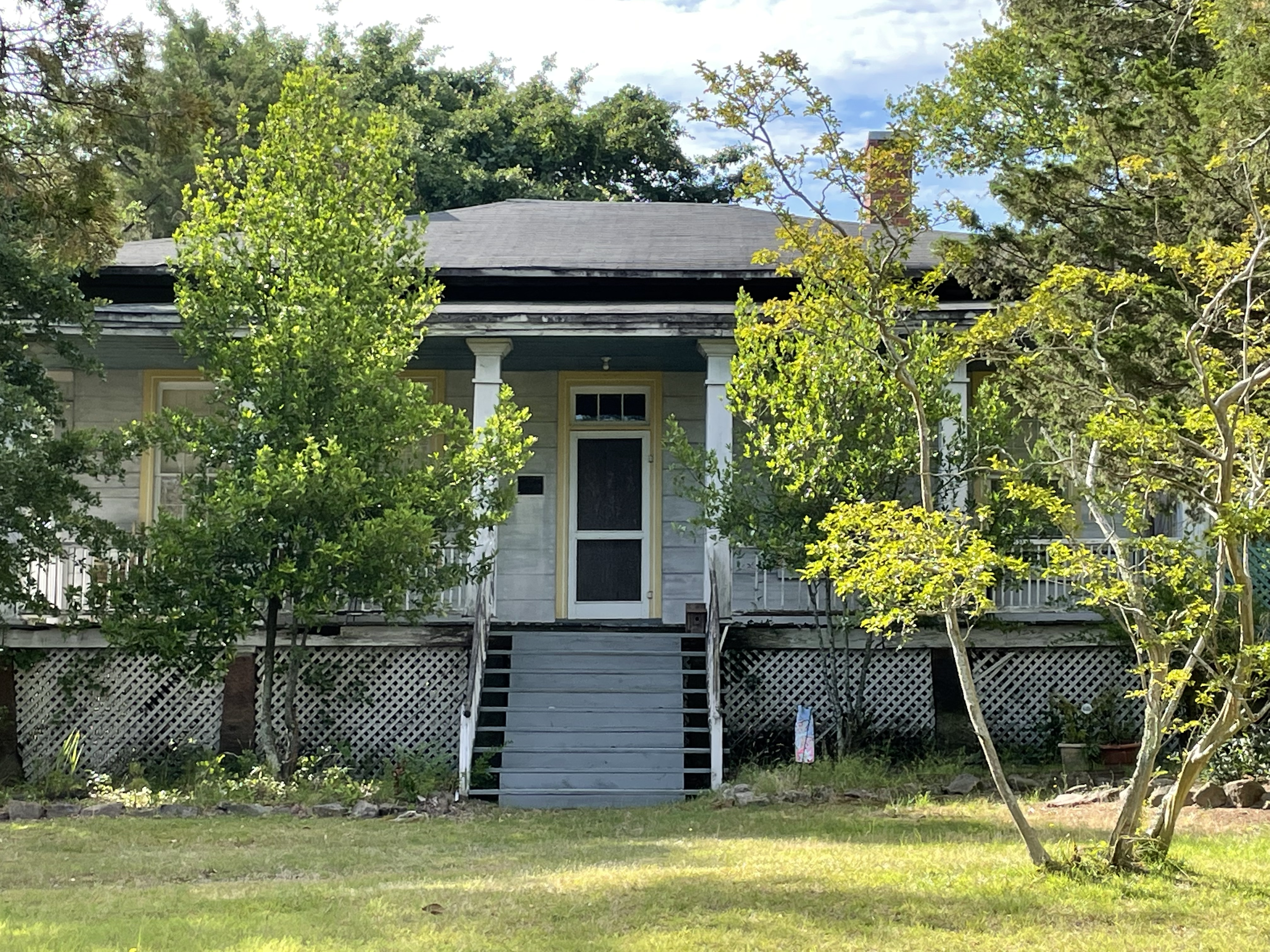

- Location within North Carolina Location within the United States
- Location: Monroe and Rockingham Streets, Carthage, North Carolina
- Coordinates: 35°20′34″N 79°24′48″W
- Area: 1.5 acres (0.61 ha)
- Built: 1850
- Built by: Stephen Brewer
- Architectural style: Greek Revival
- NRHP reference No.: 80002888
- Added to NRHP: September 29, 1980

The Bruce–Dowd–Kennedy House is a historic house located at Carthage, Moore County, North Carolina.

== Description and history ==
It was built about 1850, and is a one-story, five bay by four bay, double-pile Greek Revival style raised cottage. It has a low-pitched, broadly overhanging hip roof and an attached, full width, hip-roofed porch. The house was expanded twice by rear and side additions built at the turn of the 20th century. It has long been considered the oldest standing house in Carthage.

It was added to the National Register of Historic Places on September 29, 1980.
