= Lakeview Historic District (Lakeview, North Carolina) =

Historic district in North Carolina, United States

- U.S. National Register of Historic Places
- U.S. Historic district
- Location within North Carolina Location within the United States
- Location: Camp Easter Rd., Crystal Lake Dr., Holly Rd., Matthews Rd., and McFayden Ln., Lakeview, North Carolina
- Coordinates: 35°14′25″N 79°18′41″W
- Area: 90 acres (36 ha)
- Built: 1903
- Architectural style: Queen Anne, Classical Revival, et.al.
- NRHP reference No.: 00000513
- Added to NRHP: May 18, 2000

Lakeview Historic District is a national historic district located at Lakeview, Moore County, North Carolina. The district encompasses 43 contributing buildings, 1 contributing site, and 3 contributing structures in the early-20th century resort town of Lakeview. It was developed between the 1903 and 1940 and includes notable examples of Queen Anne and Classical Revival style architecture. Notable buildings include the Gardner House, Burr House, B. D. Usshur House (c. 1903), Newcomb-McFayden House (c. 1905), "Afterglow" (c. 1920), and the Lakeview Presbyterian Church (1907).

It was added to the National Register of Historic Places in 2000.
