= Leslie-Taylor House =

Historic house in North Carolina, United States

- U.S. National Register of Historic Places
- Location within North Carolina Location within the United States
- Location: 270 Carthage Rd., Vass, North Carolina
- Coordinates: 35°15′26″N 79°17′47″W
- Area: 11.7 acres (4.7 ha)
- Built: c. 1879
- Architectural style: Late Victorian
- NRHP reference No.: 07001407
- Added to NRHP: January 17, 2008

Leslie-Taylor House, also known as Maple Lawn, is a historic home located at Vass, Moore County, North Carolina. It was built about 1879, and is a three-story, double pile frame dwelling with Late Victorian style decorative elements. It has a clipped gable roof and features three steep Gothic gables with ornate sawn bargeboards. It has a nearly full-width front porch with rooftop balcony. Also on the property are the contributing smokehouse and carriage house.

It was added to the National Register of Historic Places in 2008.
