= Cameron, North Carolina =

- Town
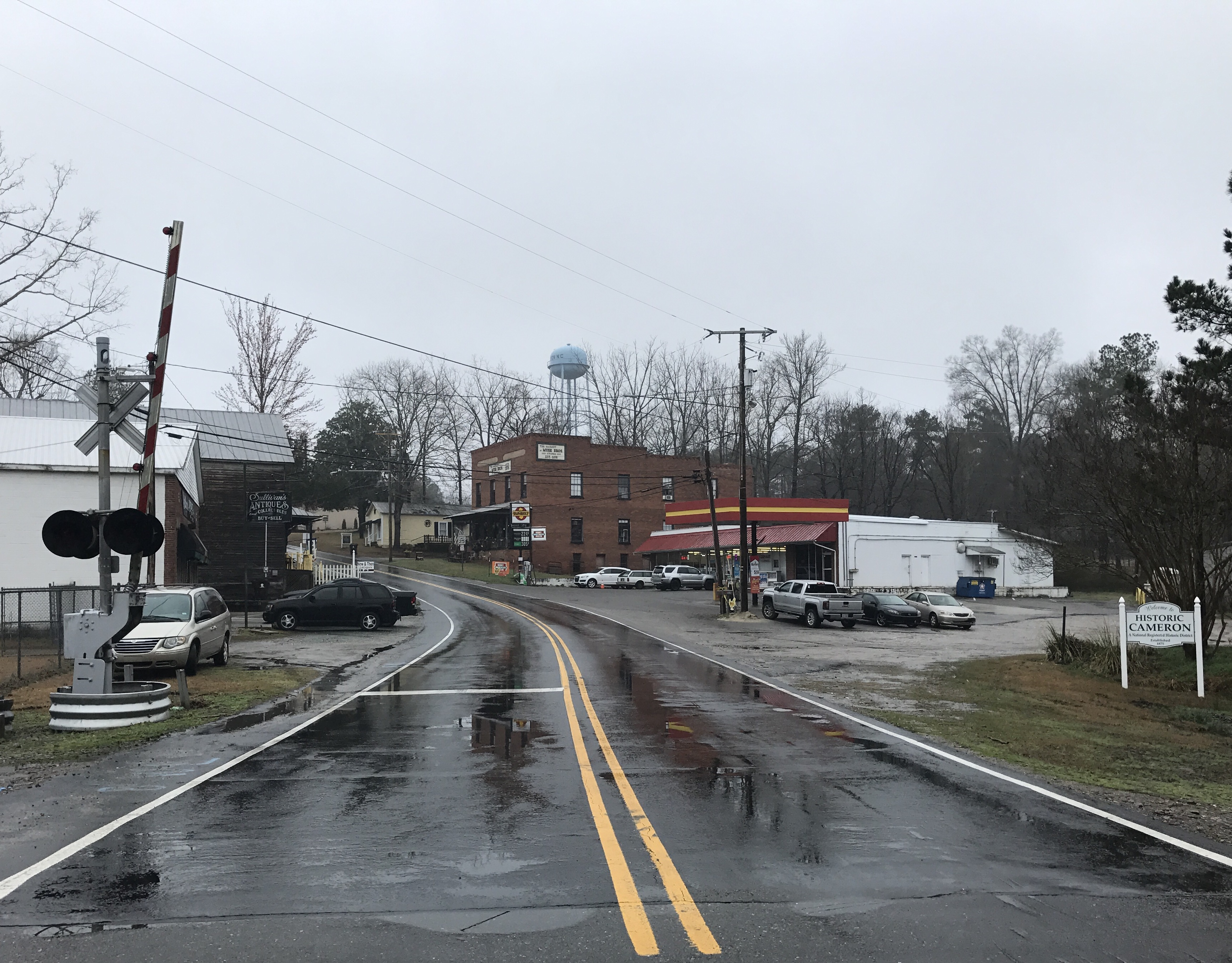

- Location in Moore County and the state of North Carolina
- Coordinates: 35°19′33″N 79°15′15″W
- Country: United States
- State: North Carolina
- County: Moore
- Mayor: Jane Harbour Ethridge
- Founded: 1875
- Incorporated: 1876
- Named after: Paul Cameron

Area
  - Total: 1.21 sq mi (3.14 km^{2})
  - Land: 1.21 sq mi (3.14 km^{2})
  - Water: 0 sq mi (0.00 km^{2})
- Elevation: 338 ft (103 m)

Population (2020)
  - Total: 244
  - Density: 201.3/sq mi (77.72/km^{2})
- Time zone: UTC-5 (Eastern (EST))
  - Summer (DST): UTC-4 (EDT)
- ZIP Code: 28326
- Area codes: 910, 472
- FIPS code: 37-09800
- GNIS feature ID: 2405369
- Website: www.townofcameron.com

Cameron is a town in Moore County, North Carolina, United States. The population was 244 at the 2020 census, down from 285 in 2010.

== History ==
Cameron grew up around a plank road that was followed in later years by a railroad. The town was planned in 1875 and incorporated in 1876. Cameron was at the end of the Raleigh and Augusta Railroad. Its location made it an ideal place for entrepreneurs to establish businesses. They built turpentine distilleries, established mercantile and hotel businesses to serve the needs of the railroad's customers and built a thriving dewberry farming and consignment operation.

== Geography ==
Cameron is in eastern Moore County. North Carolina Highways 24 and 27 pass through the center of town as Carthage Street, leading west 10 miles (16 km) to Carthage, the Moore county seat, and southeast 32 miles (51 km) to Fayetteville. U.S. Route 1 bypasses the town to the east, with its former route passing through the north and west sides of town as U.S. Route 1 Business. US 1 leads northeast 12 miles (19 km) to Sanford and southwest 15 miles (24 km) to Southern Pines. Vass is 6 miles (10 km) to the south via U.S. 1 Business.

According to the U.S. Census Bureau, the town of Cameron has a total area of 1.2 square miles (3.1 km^{2}), all land. Little Crane Creek passes through the town, flowing south to join Crane Creek north of Vass. It is part of the Cape Fear River watershed.

== Demographics ==
Historical population
| Census | Pop. | Note | %± |
|---|---|---|---|
| 1880 | 117 | | — |
| 1890 | 236 | | 101.7% |
| 1900 | 218 | | −7.6% |
| 1910 | 259 | | 18.8% |
| 1920 | 241 | | −6.9% |
| 1930 | 287 | | 19.1% |
| 1940 | 311 | | 8.4% |
| 1950 | 284 | | −8.7% |
| 1960 | 298 | | 4.9% |
| 1970 | 204 | | −31.5% |
| 1980 | 225 | | 10.3% |
| 1990 | 215 | | −4.4% |
| 2000 | 151 | | −29.8% |
| 2010 | 285 | | 88.7% |
| 2020 | 244 | | −14.4% |
U.S. Decennial Census

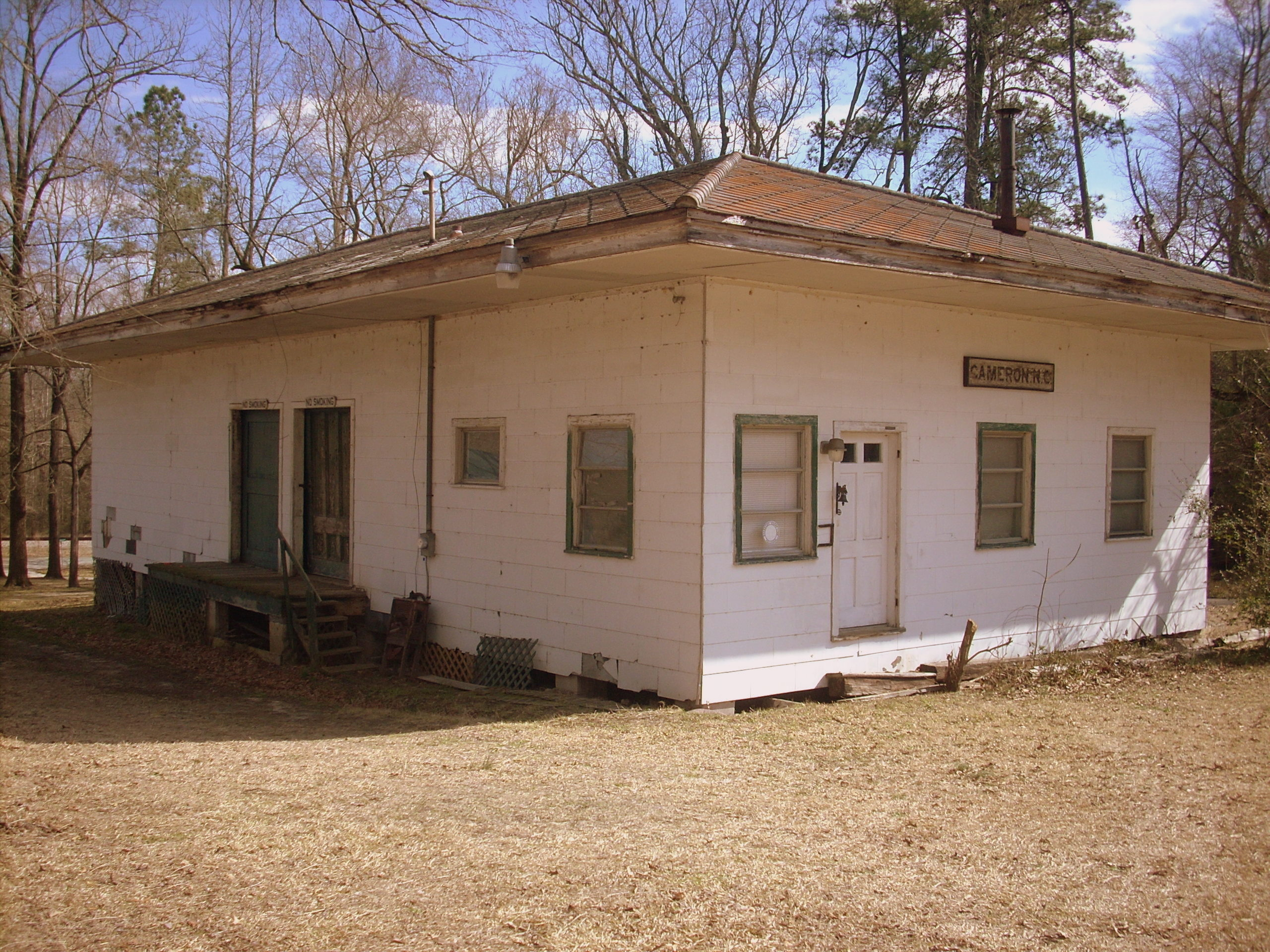
Former rail depot in Cameron

At the 2000 census there were 151 people, 66 households, and 41 families living in the town. The population density was 143.8 people per square mile (55.5 people/km^{2}). There were 78 housing units at an average density of 74.3 per square mile (28.7/km^{2}). The racial makeup of the town was 64.90% White and 35.10% Black. Of the 66 households 25.8% had children under the age of 18 living with them, 40.9% were married couples living together, 18.2% had a female householder with no husband present, and 36.4% were non-families. 31.8% of households were one person and 16.7% were one person aged 65 or older. The average household size was 2.29 and the average family size was 2.88.

The age distribution was 17.9% under the age of 18, 9.9% from 18 to 24, 30.5% from 25 to 44, 20.5% from 45 to 64, and 21.2% 65 or older. The median age was 42 years. For every 100 females, there were 75.6 males. For every 100 females aged 18 and over, there were 82.4 males.

The median household income was $32,500 and the median family income was $41,964. Males had a median income of $32,917 versus $22,500 for females. The per capita income for the town was $15,337. There were 17.9% of families and 21.3% of the population living below the poverty line, including 13.5% of those under eighteen and 45.8% of those over 64.

== Notable people ==
- Jeff Hardy, professional wrestler
- Matt Hardy, professional wrestler
- Trevor Lee, professional wrestler
- Austin Tucker Martin, perpetrator in the 2026 Mar-a-Lago shooting
- Shannon Moore, professional wrestler
