= Alexander Kelly House =

Historic house in North Carolina, United States

- U.S. National Register of Historic Places
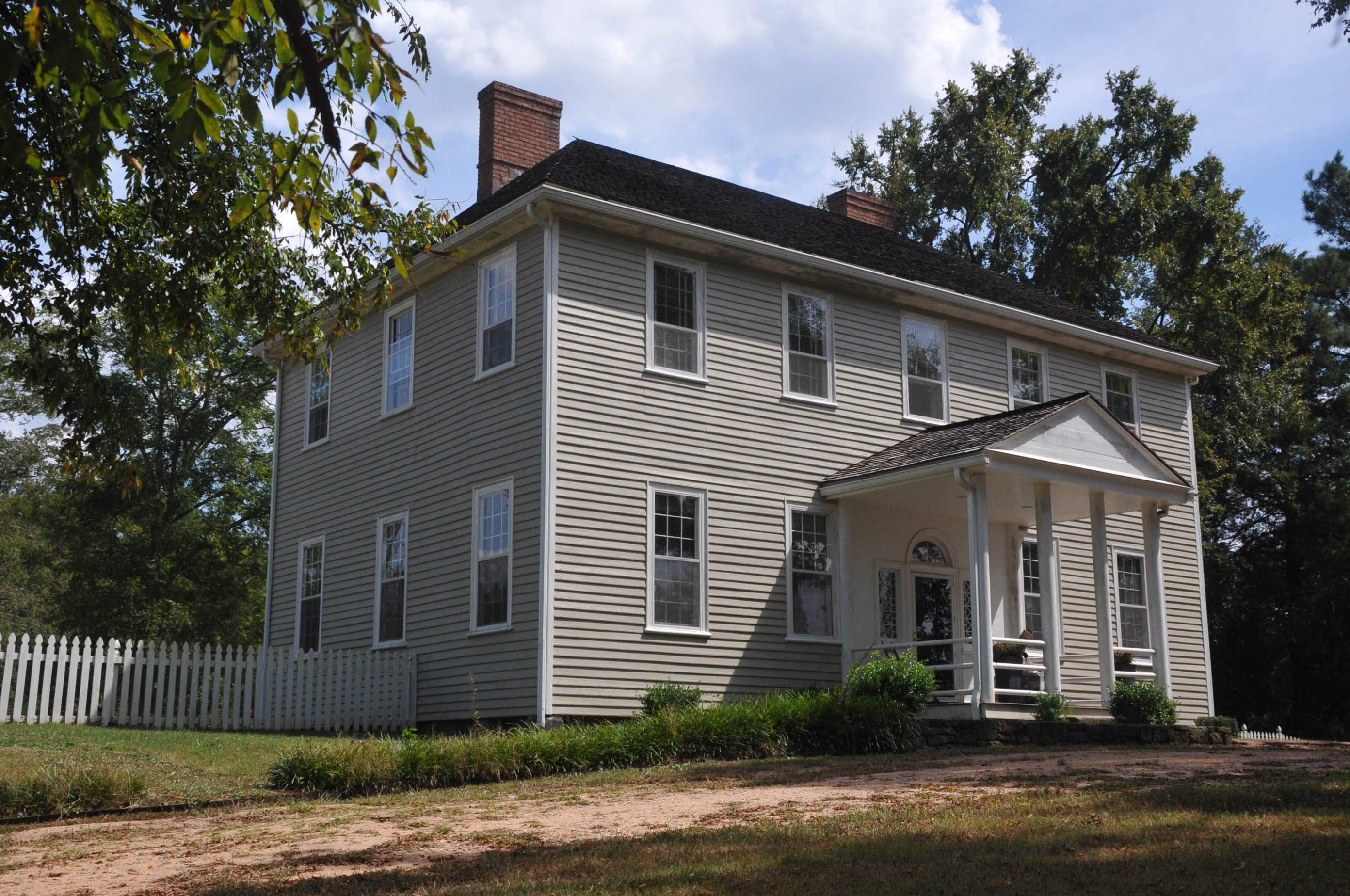
- Alexander Kelly House, March 2007

- Location within North Carolina Location within the United States
- Location: NC 1640, 0.3 miles SE of jct. with NC 1666, near Carthage, North Carolina
- Coordinates: 35°22′34″N 79°26′46″W
- Area: 9.3 acres (3.8 ha)
- Built: 1842
- Architectural style: Federal, Greek Revival
- NRHP reference No.: 02000438
- Added to NRHP: May 2, 2002

Alexander Kelly House, also known as the John B. Kelly House, is a historic plantation house located near Carthage, Moore County, North Carolina. It was built in 1842, and is a two-story, five-bay, double pile, Federal / Greek Revival style frame dwelling. The house rests on tapered, hewn brownstone piers and has a deep hip roof. The front facade features a three-bay pedimented porch.

It was added to the National Register of Historic Places in 2002.
