= Carthage Historic District (Carthage, North Carolina) =

Historic district in North Carolina, United States

- U.S. National Register of Historic Places
- U.S. Historic district
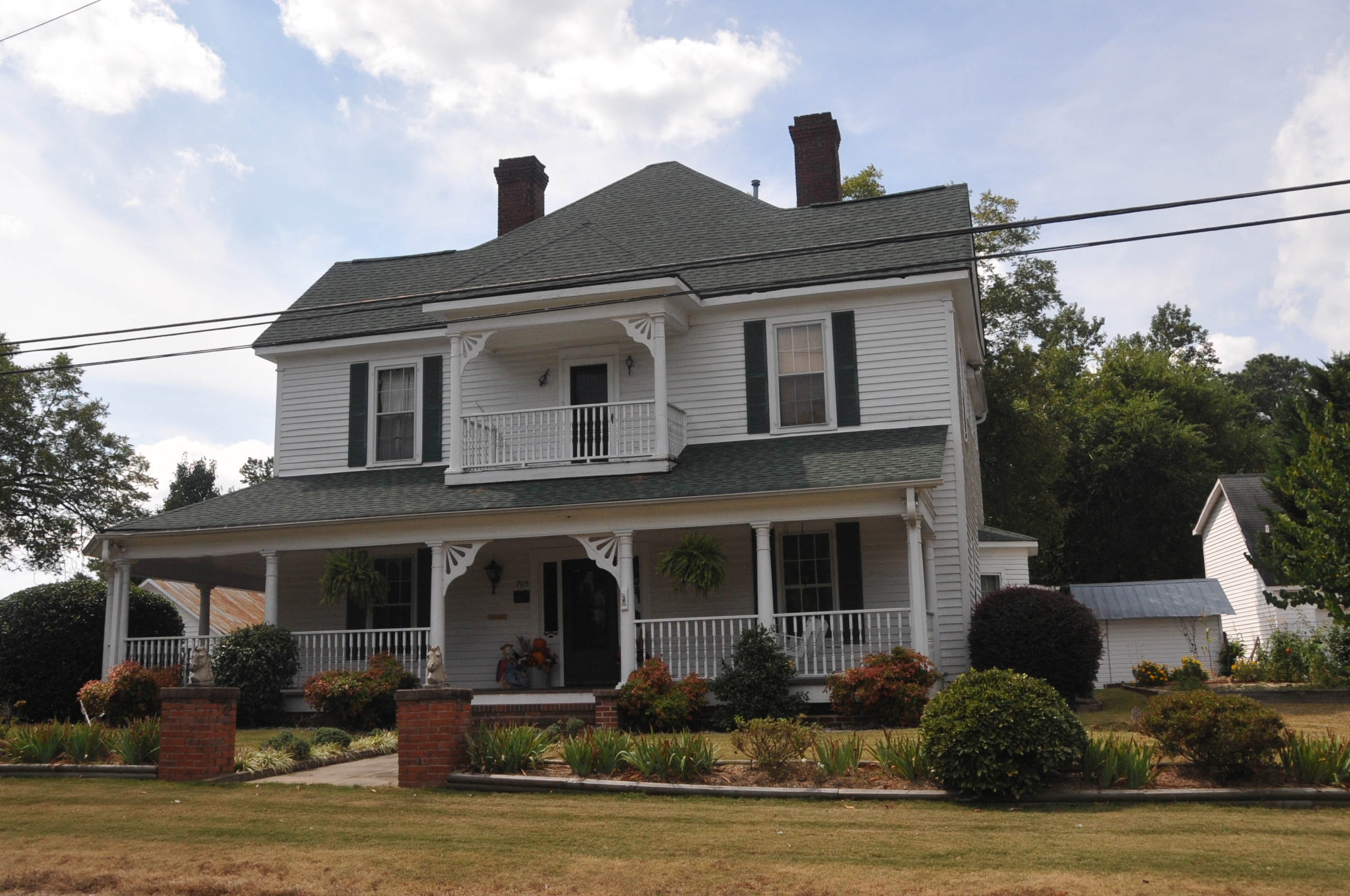
- Jenkins House, Carthage Historic District, March 2007

- Location within North Carolina Location within the United States
- Location: Roughly, McReynolds St. between Barrett St. and Glendons Rd. and parts of Barrett, Ray, Pinecrest and Brooklyn Sts., Carthage, North Carolina
- Coordinates: 35°21′04″N 79°25′23″W
- Area: 75 acres (30 ha)
- Built: 1851
- Architect: Multiple
- Architectural style: Colonial Revival, Greek Revival, Queen Anne
- NRHP reference No.: 92000182
- Added to NRHP: March 19, 1992

Carthage Historic District is a national historic district located at Carthage, Moore County, North Carolina. The district encompasses 85 contributing buildings, 1 contributing site, 5 contributing structures, and 1 contributing object in a predominantly residential section of Carthage. It was developed between the 1850s and 1940 and includes notable examples of Queen Anne, Greek Revival, and Colonial Revival style architecture. Notable buildings include the Carthage Methodist Church (1898-1900), (former) Carthage Community House (1939-1940) built by the National Youth Administration, the "Chub" Seawell House, Edgehill, Charles Sinclair House, Dr. John Shaw House, Humber-Spencer House, Adams-Bryan House, Jenkins House, Harley-Muse House (1879), George Calvin Graves House (1882, 1897), W. T. Jones House (1897), the J. F. Cole House (1899), the Methodist Parsonage (1922), and Presbyterian Manse.

It was added to the National Register of Historic Places in 1992.
