= James Bryant House =

Historic house in North Carolina, United States

- U.S. National Register of Historic Places
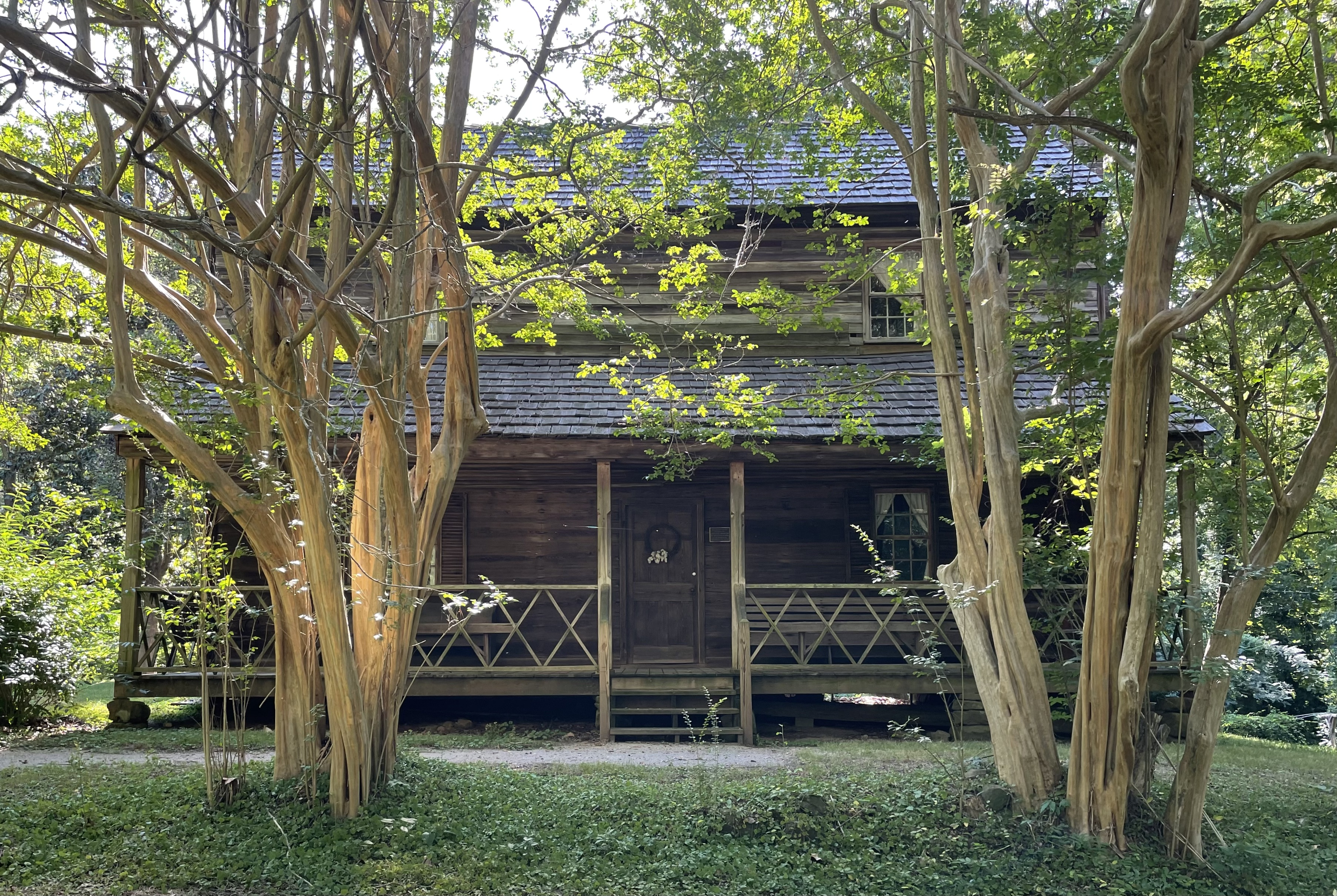

- Location within North Carolina Location within the United States
- Location: On SR 1210, near Harris Crossroads, North Carolina
- Coordinates: 35°19′7″N 79°32′41″W
- Area: 3.4 acres (1.4 ha)
- Built: c. 1820
- NRHP reference No.: 82003490
- Added to NRHP: April 15, 1982

James Bryant House is a historic home located near Harris Crossroads, Moore County, North Carolina. It is dated to about 1820, and is a two-story, three-bay, single-pile frame farmhouse. It rests on a fieldstone pier foundation, has a gable roof, shed porch, and rear shed rooms. The house has been restored. It was added to the National Register of Historic Places in 1982.

The McLendon Cabin beside the house served as a detached kitchen after the larger house was built. It was constructed by early settler Joel McLendon c. 1758-1760. The one-room log dwelling, representative of those built by the early settlers of the region, is the oldest house in Moore County on its original location. It has been described as "a well-proportioned structure whose early features reflect exacting workmanship." Standing approximately 40 feet (12 m) to the side of the James Bryant House, it served as a kitchen after the larger house was built. It was restored in 1970 by the Moore County Historical Association.

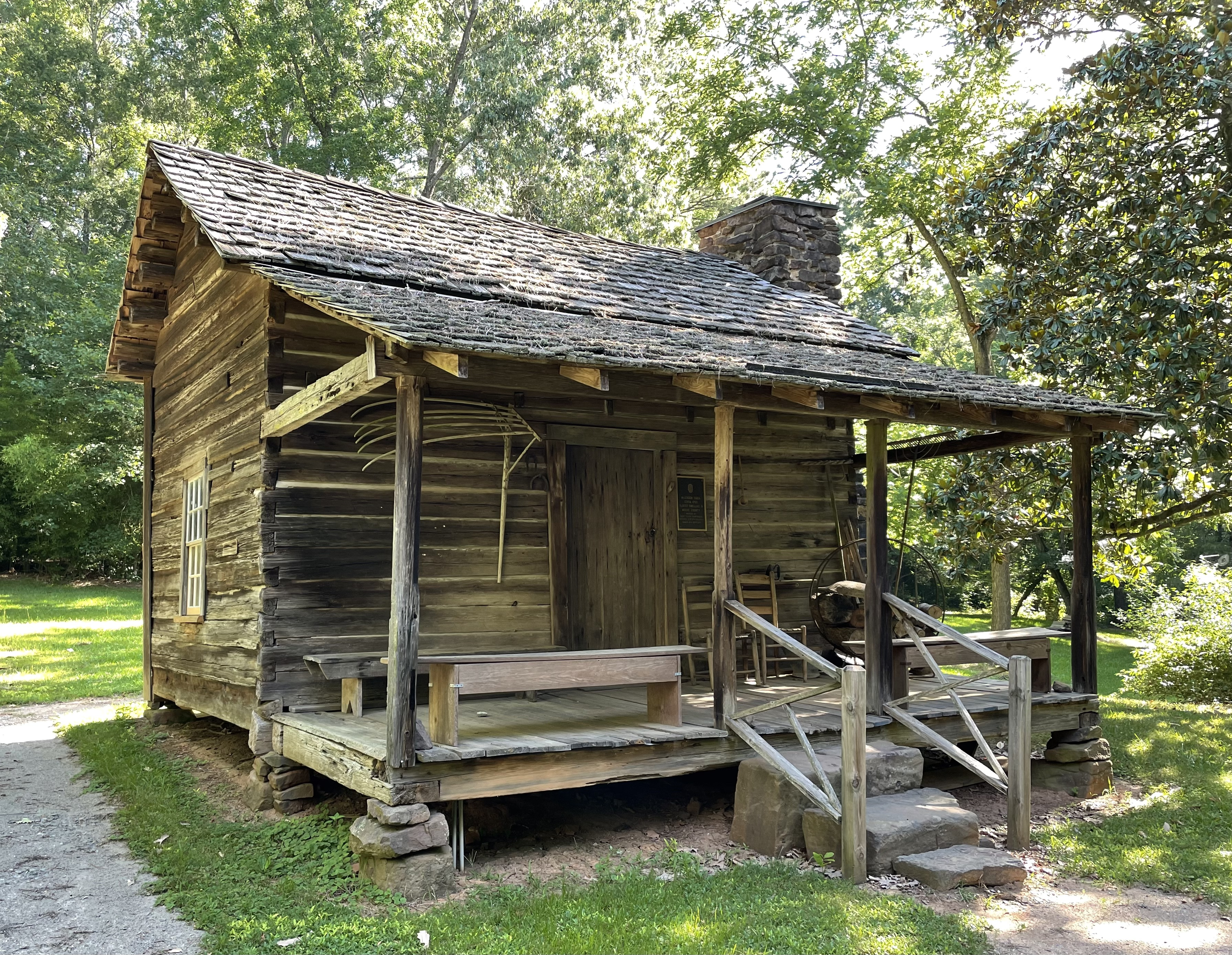
McLendon Cabin
