= John Blue House (Aberdeen, North Carolina) =

Historic house in North Carolina, United States

- U.S. National Register of Historic Places
- Location within North Carolina Location within the United States
- Location: 200 Blue St., Aberdeen, North Carolina
- Coordinates: 35°7′50″N 79°25′22″W
- Area: 4 acres (1.6 ha)
- Built: 1888
- Architect: Hooker, Charles
- Architectural style: Colonial Revival
- NRHP reference No.: 82003488
- Added to NRHP: July 29, 1982

John Blue House, also known as "Blue House," was a historic home located at Aberdeen, Moore County, North Carolina. It was built in 1888, and was a two-story, Colonial Revival style frame dwelling. It featured a grand tetrastyle portico supported by Doric order columns added in 1903. It was built by John Blue, founder of the Aberdeen and Rockfish Railroad. It has been demolished.

It was added to the National Register of Historic Places in 1982.
