= Aberdeen, North Carolina =

- Town
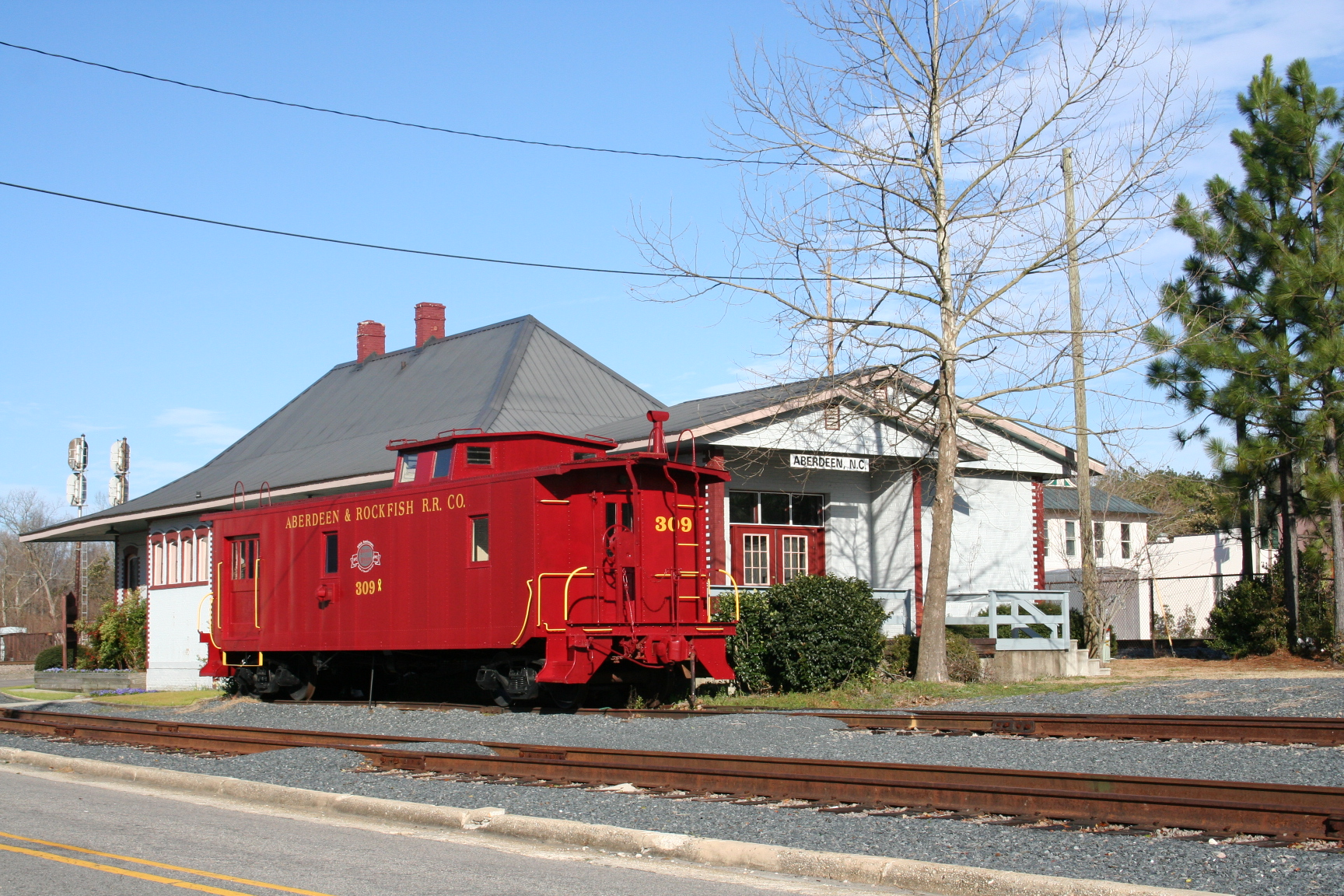
- Aberdeen train station

- Seal

- Location in Moore County and the state of North Carolina

- Location within North Carolina Location within the United States
- Coordinates: 35°08′05″N 79°25′58″W
- Country: United States
- State: North Carolina
- County: Moore
- Incorporated: 1893
- Named for: Aberdeen, MS

Government
  - Type: Commissioner-manager
  - Mayor: Robert A. (Robbie) Farrell

Area
  - Total: 11.02 sq mi (28.5 km^{2})
  - Land: 10.83 sq mi (28.0 km^{2})
  - Water: 0.19 sq mi (0.49 km^{2})
- Elevation: 381 ft (116 m)

Population (2020)
  - Total: 8,516
  - Estimate (2022): 9,305
  - Density: 858.9/sq mi (331.6/km^{2})
- Time zone: UTC-5 (Eastern (EST))
  - Summer (DST): UTC-4 (EDT)
- ZIP Code: 28315
- Area codes: 910, 472
- FIPS code: 37-00160
- GNIS feature ID: 2405118
- Website: www.townofaberdeen.net

Aberdeen is a town in Moore County, North Carolina, United States. The population was 8,516 at the 2020 census, and an estimated 9,305 in 2022.

== History ==
Scottish emigrants were the first Europeans to settle the area, beginning in 1745. They were drawn to the area by bountiful hunting and virgin land, and they founded the communities of Bethesda and Blue's Crossing by the late 18th Century.

During the American Revolution, the people of what is now Aberdeen were generally Loyalists. There were a few small skirmishes in the vicinity of Aberdeen, most notably the one at Ray's Mill Creek, in which Colonel Philip Alston of the House in the Horseshoe, who was in pursuit of Loyalist Colonel David Fanning, savagely beat Kenneth Black, a local who had acted as Fanning's guide through the area.

One of the earliest industries of Bethesda and Blue's Crossing was naval stores due to the abundance of pine trees in the area. These goods were transported to market initially via the Cape Fear River to Wilmington, and later by plank road.

Over 1,500 residents of what is now Aberdeen participated in the Civil War. Nearly one-third of the soldiers sent were killed, which decimated the labor supply. After the Civil War, however, the Raleigh and Augusta Air Line Railroad connected the community of Blue's Crossing to the rest of the country, allowing them to sell their naval stores and timber to the rest of the country.

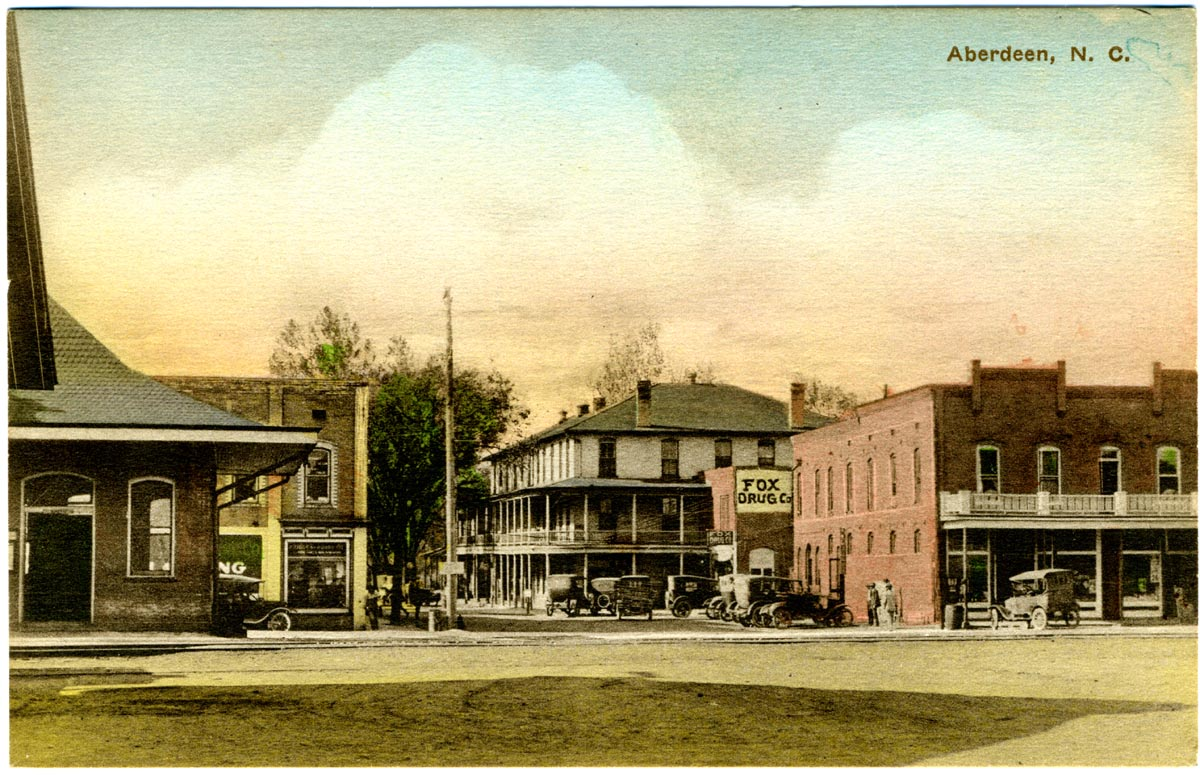
Aberdeen between 1905 and 1915.

In 1877, a post office was established and Malcolm J. Blue was appointed postmaster. Four years later, Allison F. Page bought numerous forested acres to build a rail line, as well as to clear the land for timber. This land was later sold to James Walker Tufts for $1 per 1 acre (4,000 m^{2}), and later became home of the historic golf resort, Pinehurst Resort. Blue's Crossing's name was officially changed to the present Aberdeen in 1888.

In the early twentieth century, tobacco farming came to the town. Aberdeen's proximity to Pinehurst resulted in a boom in the tourism and retirement industries, which remain a major part of the local economy today.

The Aberdeen Historic District, Bethesda Presbyterian Church, John Blue House, and Malcolm Blue Farm are listed on the National Register of Historic Places.

== Geography ==
Aberdeen is in southern Moore County in the Sandhills region of North Carolina. It is bordered to the northwest by Pinehurst and to the northeast by Southern Pines. U.S. Routes 1, 15, and 501 pass through the town together as Sandhills Boulevard. Sanford is 30 miles (48 km) to the northeast via Route 1, while Carthage, the Moore county seat, is 16 miles (26 km) to the north via Routes 15 and 501. Route 1 leads southwest from Aberdeen 26 miles (42 km) to Rockingham, and Routes 15/501 lead south 25 miles (40 km) to Laurinburg. North Carolina Highway 5 has its eastern terminus in Aberdeen and leads northwest 6 miles (10 km) to the center of Pinehurst. North Carolina Highway 211 follows Routes 1/15/501 through Aberdeen but leads southeast 17 miles (27 km) to Raeford.

According to the U.S. Census Bureau, the town of Aberdeen has a total area of 11.0 square miles (28 km^{2}), of which 0.2 square miles (0.5 km^{2}), or 1.71%, are water. Aberdeen Creek, a tributary to Drowning Creek (an upstream name for the Lumber River), flows southward through the middle of Aberdeen.

== Education ==
The following schools are located in Aberdeen:

- The Academy of Moore County
- Aberdeen Elementary School
- Southern Middle School

In addition, the area is served by Pinecrest High School and Sandhills Community College.

== Demographics ==
Historical population
Census	Pop.	Note	%±
1890	227		—
1900	559		146.3%
1910	794		42.0%
1920	858		8.1%
1930	1,382		61.1%
1940	1,076		−22.1%
1950	1,603		49.0%
1960	1,531		−4.5%
1970	1,592		4.0%
1980	1,945		22.2%
1990	2,700		38.8%
2000	3,400		25.9%
2010	6,350		86.8%
2020	8,516		34.1%
2022 (est.)	9,305	▲	9.3%
U.S. Decennial Census

=== 2020 census ===
As of the 2020 census, Aberdeen had a population of 8,516. The median age was 35.2 years. 23.6% of residents were under the age of 18 and 16.5% of residents were 65 years of age or older. For every 100 females there were 91.3 males, and for every 100 females age 18 and over there were 85.5 males age 18 and over.

91.1% of residents lived in urban areas, while 8.9% lived in rural areas.

As of the 2020 census, there were 2,891 households and 1,786 families residing in the town. Of all households, 30.2% had children under the age of 18 living in them. 41.5% were married-couple households, 19.5% were households with a male householder and no spouse or partner present, and 32.9% were households with a female householder and no spouse or partner present. About 34.6% of all households were made up of individuals and 12.9% had someone living alone who was 65 years of age or older.

There were 3,879 housing units, of which 7.3% were vacant. The homeowner vacancy rate was 3.5% and the rental vacancy rate was 5.8%.

Aberdeen racial composition
Race	Number	Percentage
White (non-Hispanic)	5,366	63.01%
Black or African American (non-Hispanic)	1,761	20.68%
Native American	92	1.08%
Asian	158	1.86%
Pacific Islander	1	0.01%
Other/Mixed	537	6.31%
Hispanic or Latino	601	7.06%

=== 2000 census ===
As of the census of 2000, there were 3,400 people, 1,526 households, and 929 families residing in the town. The population density was 551.6 inhabitants per square mile (213.0/km^{2}). There were 1,655 housing units at an average density of 268.5 per square mile (103.7/km^{2}). The racial makeup of the town was 73.03% White, 21.76% African American, 0.94% Native American, 1.21% Asian, 1.76% from other races, and 1.29% from two or more races. Hispanic or Latino of any race were 3.97% of the population.

There were 1,526 households, out of which 25.2% had children under the age of 18 living with them, 46.4% were married couples living together, 11.9% had a female householder with no husband present, and 39.1% were non-families. 34.1% of all households were made up of individuals, and 15.9% had someone living alone who was 65 years of age or older. The average household size was 2.23 and the average family size was 2.83.

In the town, the population was spread out, with 22.1% under the age of 18, 8.2% from 18 to 24, 30.3% from 25 to 44, 21.4% from 45 to 64, and 18.0% who were 65 years of age or older. The median age was 38 years. For every 100 females, there were 90.1 males. For every 100 females age 18 and over, there were 85.4 males.

The median income for a household in the town was $31,911, and the median income for a family was $42,383. Males had a median income of $30,906 versus $23,403 for females. The per capita income for the town was $18,045. About 9.8% of families and 13.8% of the population were below the poverty line, including 13.5% of those under age 18 and 19.0% of those age 65 or over.
