= Carthage, North Carolina =

- City
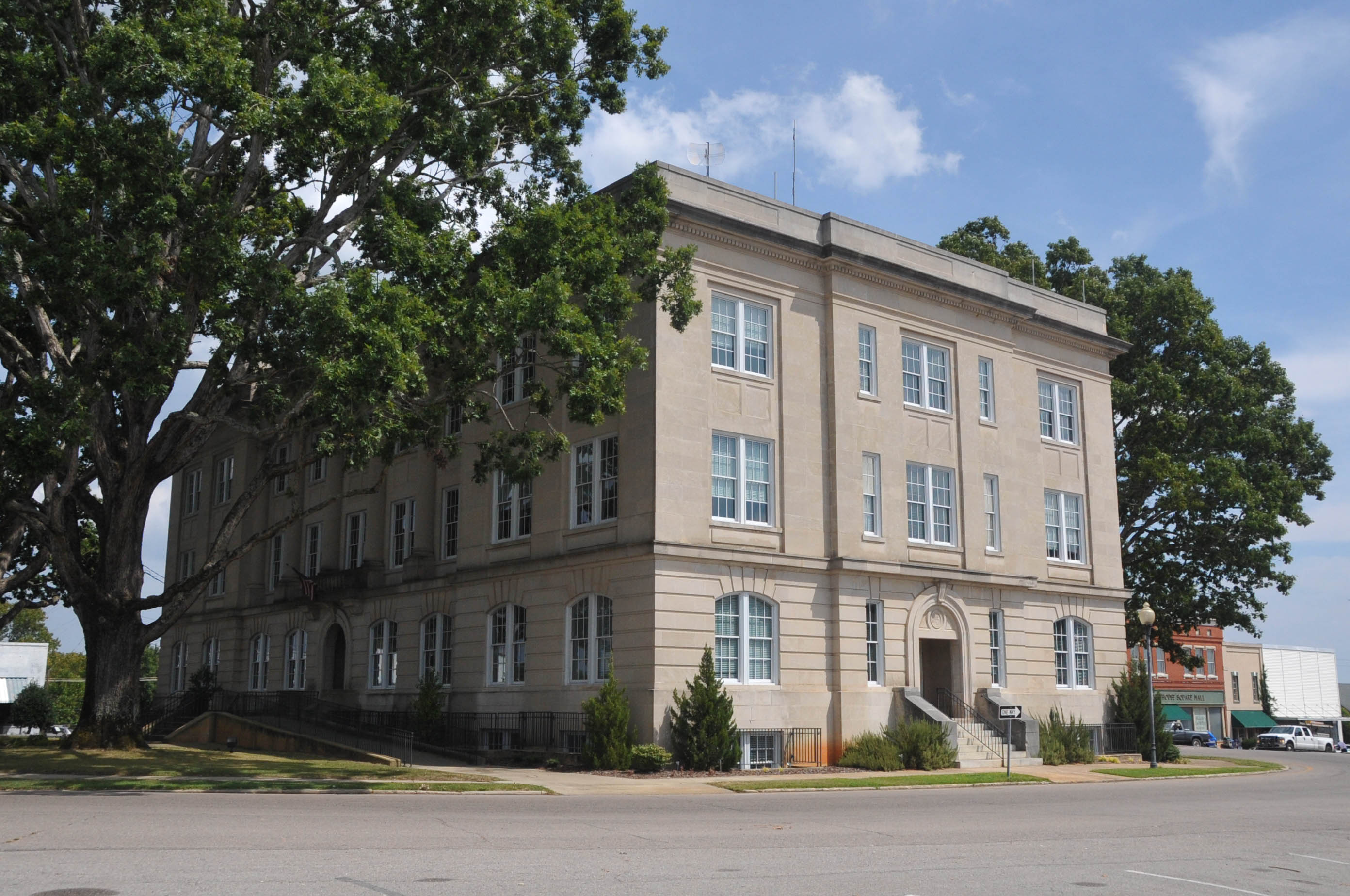
- Moore County Courthouse in Carthage

- Seal

- Location in Moore County and the state of North Carolina
- Coordinates: 35°19′22″N 79°24′41″W
- Country: United States
- State: North Carolina
- County: Moore
- Founded: 1796
- Incorporated: 1796
- Named after: Carthage

Government
  - Type: Council-manager
  - Mayor: Jimmy Chaffinch

Area
  - Total: 6.85 sq mi (17.7 km^{2})
  - Land: 6.82 sq mi (17.7 km^{2})
  - Water: 0.04 sq mi (0.10 km^{2})
- Elevation: 538 ft (164 m)

Population (2020)
  - Total: 2,775
  - Density: 407.2/sq mi (157.2/km^{2})
- Time zone: UTC-5 (Eastern (EST))
  - Summer (DST): UTC-4 (EDT)
- ZIP Code: 28327
- Area codes: 910, 472
- FIPS code: 37-10680
- GNIS feature ID: 2406227
- Website: www.townofcarthage.org

Carthage is a city in and the county seat of Moore County, North Carolina, United States. The population was 2,775 at the 2020 census, up from 2,205 in 2010. Carthage is named after the ancient city of Carthage in modern Tunisia (North Africa).

== History ==
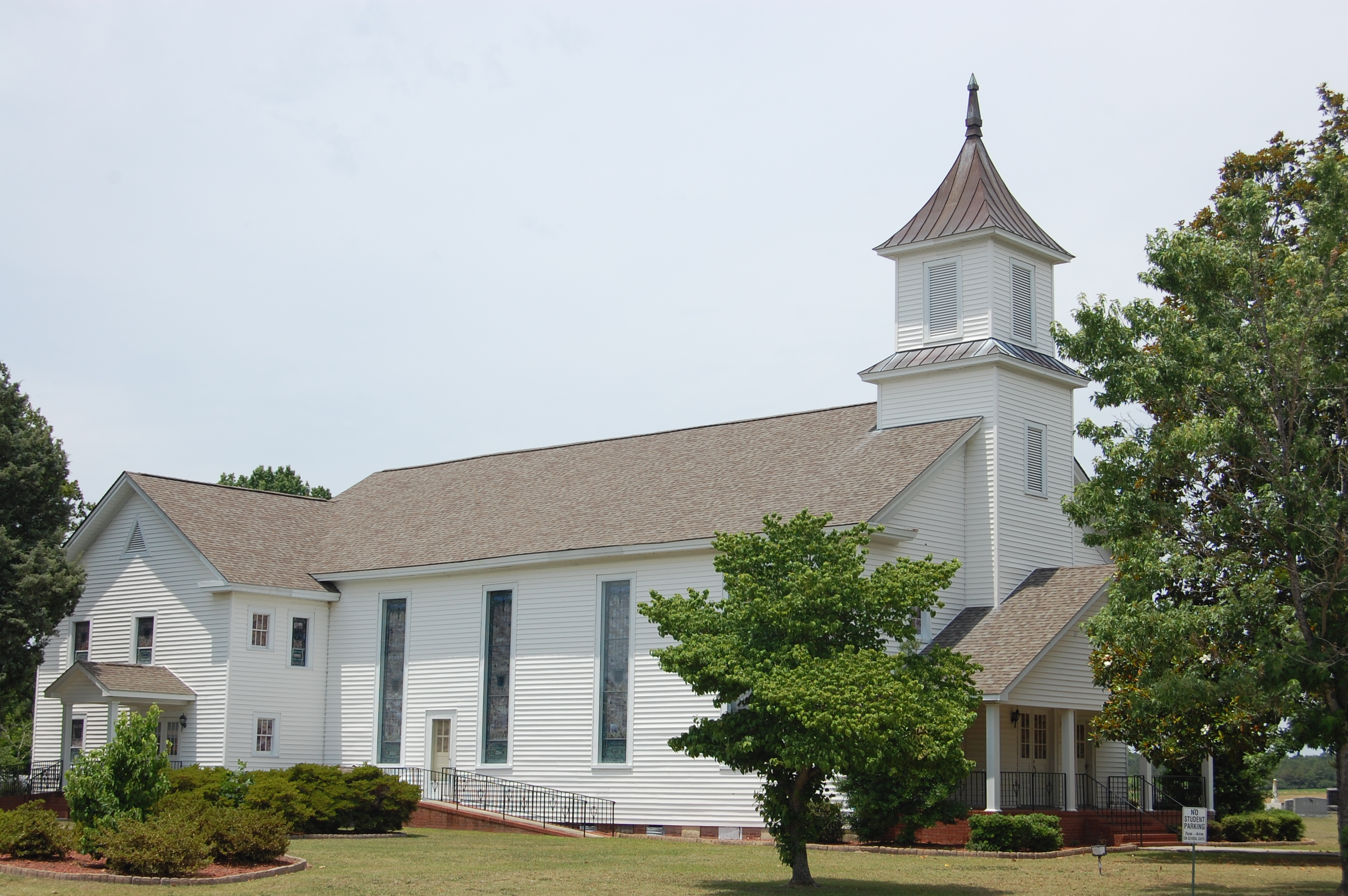
Union Presbyterian Church

The town was the home of the Tyson & Jones Buggy Company, a predominant cart and buggy manufacturer in the late 1800s. A common local story is that after the closing of the Tyson Buggy Company, Henry Ford was interested in buying the old plant and converting it into a car assembly line. According to the legend, the owners refused to let Ford buy the plant. He moved on and built his first plant in Detroit, making it the center of auto manufacturing. This story is often repeated despite a lack of evidence, and it runs contrary to the life of Ford, who was born and raised in Detroit and started his businesses there. A few years after being closed, the former Tyson Buggy plant burned down.

Another common local story is that the town was originally selected as the site for the University of North Carolina. Supposedly, city leaders did not want the university built there. City leaders purportedly told the state that Carthage was on too steep of a hill for locomotives to climb and that access to the university would be limited if built there. This often-repeated story does not account for the fact that locomotives were not invented until two decades after the university had been built in Chapel Hill.

The town has an annual event in spring called the Buggy Festival. This event is used to showcase the history of the town and features music, hot rods, old tractors, old buggies made by the Tyson Buggy Company, and crafts from potteries in the surrounding areas. The festival is held in the town square around the Old Court House, recognized as a historic landmark.

Tyson & Jones buggy factory partner William T. Jones was born the son of a slave and her white owner in 1833. By the time of his death in 1910, William T. Jones was one of the prominent business owners in Carthage. He rubbed elbows with the elite, white, upper class in Moore County during the 1880s, dined with them, threw elaborate holiday parties where most of the guests were white, and even attended church with them. Both of his wives, Sophia Isabella McLean and Florence Dockery, were white. Dockery was the daughter of a well-to-do Apex family.

James Rogers McConnell (March 14, 1887 – March 19, 1917), a resident of Carthage, flew as an aviator during World War I in the Lafayette Escadrille and authored Flying for France. He was the first of 64 University of Virginia students to die in battle during that war. McConnell was flying in the area of St-Quentin when two German planes shot him down on March 19, 1917. He was the last American pilot of the squadron to die under French colors before America entered the war in April 1917. Both the plane and his body were found by the French, and he was buried at the site of his death at the edge of the village of Jussy, and was later reinterred at the Lafayette Escadrille memorial near Paris upon his father's wishes. McConnell was commemorated with a plaque by the French government and a statue by Gutzon Borglum at the University of Virginia, as well as an obelisk on the court square of his home town of Carthage.

The J.F. Cole House in the Carthage Historic District, J.C. Black House, Daniel Blue House, Bruce-Dowd-Kennedy House, Carthage Historic District, Alexander Kelly House, and Moore County Courthouse are listed on the National Register of Historic Places.

== Geography ==
Carthage is in east-central Moore County. North Carolina Highways 24 and 27 pass through the center of town as McReynolds Street (to the northwest) and Monroe Street (to the southeast), leading west 29 miles (47 km) to Troy and southeast 42 miles (68 km) to Fayetteville. North Carolina Highway 22 enters Carthage on McReynolds Street with NC-24/27 but turns south in the center of town onto McNeill Street. Highway 22 leads south 13 miles (21 km) to Southern Pines and northwest 32 miles (51 km) to Ramseur. U.S. Routes 15 and 501 pass through the southeast side of the town on a bypass; the combined highways lead northeast 18 miles (29 km) to Sanford and south 16 miles (26 km) to Aberdeen.

According to the U.S. Census Bureau, the town of Carthage has a total area of 6.9 square miles (17.9 km^{2}), of which 0.04 square miles (0.10 km^{2}), or 0.55%, are water. The town sits on a ridge which drains north toward Little Creek and southwest toward Killets Creek, both tributaries of McLendons Creek, a north-flowing tributary of the Deep River. The southeast part of town drains toward Dunhams Creek, an east-flowing tributary of Cranes Creek. The entire town is within the Cape Fear River watershed.

=== Climate ===
Climate data for Carthage, North Carolina, 1991–2020 normals, extremes 1981–present
Month	Jan	Feb	Mar	Apr	May	Jun	Jul	Aug	Sep	Oct	Nov	Dec	Year
Record high °F (°C)	77 (25)	81 (27)	88 (31)	102 (39)	97 (36)	107 (42)	104 (40)	104 (40)	96 (36)	98 (37)	84 (29)	78 (26)	107 (42)
Mean maximum °F (°C)	71.0 (21.7)	72.6 (22.6)	81.0 (27.2)	86.7 (30.4)	90.1 (32.3)	95.2 (35.1)	96.4 (35.8)	95.7 (35.4)	91.9 (33.3)	85.8 (29.9)	78.3 (25.7)	71.9 (22.2)	98.3 (36.8)
Mean daily maximum °F (°C)	52.6 (11.4)	55.7 (13.2)	65.2 (18.4)	73.2 (22.9)	80.4 (26.9)	86.7 (30.4)	90.3 (32.4)	87.8 (31.0)	83.3 (28.5)	73.0 (22.8)	64.0 (17.8)	55.2 (12.9)	72.3 (22.4)
Daily mean °F (°C)	41.6 (5.3)	44.0 (6.7)	52.6 (11.4)	60.0 (15.6)	68.5 (20.3)	76.0 (24.4)	79.7 (26.5)	77.6 (25.3)	72.1 (22.3)	61.1 (16.2)	51.4 (10.8)	44.2 (6.8)	60.7 (15.9)
Mean daily minimum °F (°C)	30.6 (−0.8)	32.3 (0.2)	40.0 (4.4)	46.8 (8.2)	56.5 (13.6)	65.3 (18.5)	69.1 (20.6)	67.3 (19.6)	60.9 (16.1)	49.1 (9.5)	38.7 (3.7)	33.1 (0.6)	49.1 (9.5)
Mean minimum °F (°C)	13.8 (−10.1)	19.4 (−7.0)	23.1 (−4.9)	33.0 (0.6)	41.6 (5.3)	56.7 (13.7)	60.7 (15.9)	59.0 (15.0)	50.4 (10.2)	35.7 (2.1)	25.6 (−3.6)	20.3 (−6.5)	12.6 (−10.8)
Record low °F (°C)	5 (−15)	4 (−16)	14 (−10)	24 (−4)	29 (−2)	47 (8)	51 (11)	42 (6)	41 (5)	28 (−2)	16 (−9)	9 (−13)	4 (−16)
Average precipitation inches (mm)	3.93 (100)	3.09 (78)	4.12 (105)	3.32 (84)	2.95 (75)	4.50 (114)	4.72 (120)	4.86 (123)	5.67 (144)	3.38 (86)	3.61 (92)	3.66 (93)	47.81 (1,214)
Average snowfall inches (cm)	0.7 (1.8)	0.3 (0.76)	0.2 (0.51)	0.0 (0.0)	0.0 (0.0)	0.0 (0.0)	0.0 (0.0)	0.0 (0.0)	0.0 (0.0)	0.0 (0.0)	0.0 (0.0)	0.1 (0.25)	1.3 (3.3)
Average precipitation days (≥ 0.01 in)	8.3	7.2	7.8	6.8	6.7	8.2	8.7	8.4	6.7	6.4	6.6	7.5	89.3
Average snowy days (≥ 0.1 in)	0.4	0.2	0.1	0.0	0.0	0.0	0.0	0.0	0.0	0.0	0.0	0.1	0.8
Source 1: NOAA
Source 2: National Weather Service

== Demographics ==
Historical population
Census	Pop.	Note	%±
1880	366		—
1890	485		32.5%
1900	605		24.7%
1910	863		42.6%
1920	962		11.5%
1930	1,129		17.4%
1940	1,381		22.3%
1950	1,194		−13.5%
1960	1,190		−0.3%
1970	1,034		−13.1%
1980	925		−10.5%
1990	976		5.5%
2000	1,871		91.7%
2010	2,205		17.9%
2020	2,775		25.9%
U.S. Decennial Census

=== 2020 census ===
As of the 2020 census, Carthage had a population of 2,775. The median age was 38.8 years. 26.2% of residents were under the age of 18 and 20.7% of residents were 65 years of age or older. For every 100 females there were 83.7 males, and for every 100 females age 18 and over there were 82.4 males age 18 and over.

0.0% of residents lived in urban areas, while 100.0% lived in rural areas.

There were 1,021 households in Carthage, of which 37.7% had children under the age of 18 living in them. Of all households, 47.5% were married-couple households, 16.6% were households with a male householder and no spouse or partner present, and 32.1% were households with a female householder and no spouse or partner present. About 28.9% of all households were made up of individuals and 14.9% had someone living alone who was 65 years of age or older.

There were 1,216 housing units, of which 16.0% were vacant. The homeowner vacancy rate was 0.8% and the rental vacancy rate was 7.6%.

Carthage racial composition
Race	Number	Percentage
White (non-Hispanic)	1,897	68.36%
Black or African American (non-Hispanic)	415	14.95%
Native American	31	1.12%
Asian	10	0.36%
Pacific Islander	1	0.04%
Other/Mixed	158	5.69%
Hispanic or Latino	263	9.48%

=== Demographic estimates ===
Carthage is currently growing at a rate of 1.58% annually and its population has increased by 19.50% since the most recent census, which recorded a population of 2,205 in 2010. Spanning over 7 miles, Carthage has a population density of 397 people per square mile.

The average household income in Carthage is $59,183 with a poverty rate of 11.67%. The median rental costs in recent years comes to $727 per month, and the median house value is $173,900.

== Notable people ==
- Lucean Arthur Headen (1879–1957), African-American aviator, inventor, and entrepreneur
- Andrew Johnson, 17th president of the United States; lived in Carthage during his teenage years
- Mable Parker McLean (1922–2012), academic administrator
- Austin Tucker Martin (200X-2026), killed breaching President Trump's Florida home.

== 2009 shooting ==
On March 29, 2009, a man named Robert Stewart shot and killed eight people and wounded two others at the Pinelake Health and Rehab Center of Carthage. Seven of the victims were elderly patients, with ages ranging from 75 to 98 years old. The eighth was a 39-year-old registered nurse who worked at the facility. The gunman, Robert Stewart, exchanged gunfire with a local police officer, wounding him in the leg before he himself was wounded and taken to a nearby medical facility.

== See also ==
- Moore County substation attack
