= Vass, North Carolina =

- Town
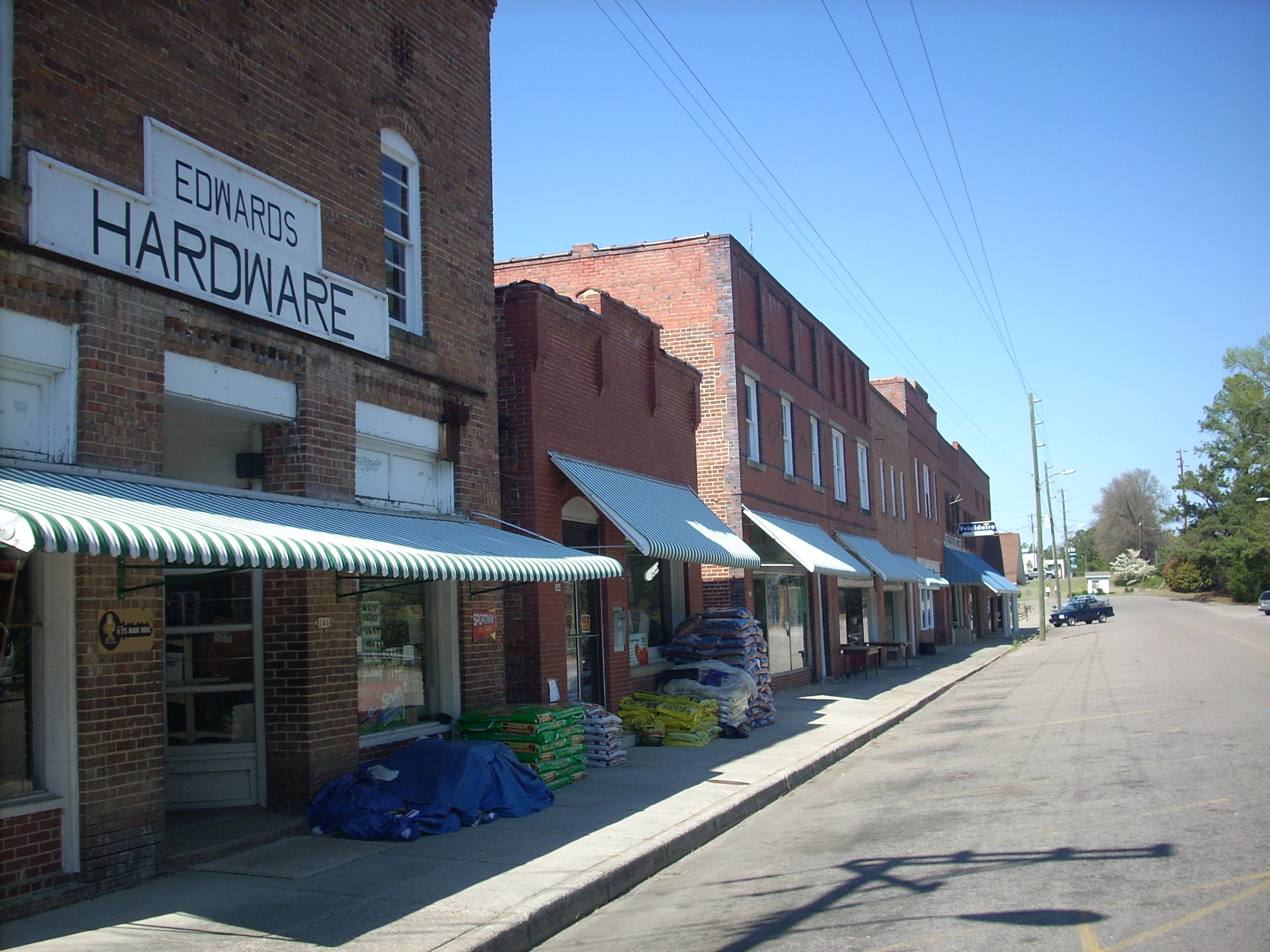
- Seaboard Street

- Location in Moore County and the state of North Carolina

- Location within North Carolina Location within the United States
- Coordinates: 35°15′10″N 79°17′05″W
- Country: United States
- State: North Carolina
- County: Moore
- Settled: Late 1800s
- Incorporated: 1907
- Named for: William Worrell Vass

Government
  - Mayor: Eddie Callahan

Area
  - Total: 3.39 sq mi (8.8 km^{2})
  - Land: 3.37 sq mi (8.7 km^{2})
  - Water: 0.02 sq mi (0.052 km^{2})
- Elevation: 295 ft (90 m)

Population (2020)
  - Total: 952
  - Density: 284.9/sq mi (109.99/km^{2})
- Time zone: UTC-5 (Eastern (EST))
  - Summer (DST): UTC-4 (EDT)
- ZIP Code: 28394
- Area codes: 910, 472
- FIPS code: 37-69840
- GNIS feature ID: 2406796
- Website: www.townofvassnc.gov

Vass is a town in Moore County, North Carolina, United States. The population was 952 at the 2020 census, up from 720 in 2010. Vass grew up along the railroad in the late 19th century. It was originally named "Bynum" and later "Winder", before being established as Vass in 1892. The town was incorporated in 1907.

== History ==
Vass originated as a stop on the Seaboard Railway as a station called Bynum. It was primarily a place with a siding to load lumber, turpentine and resin from the local area. In 1877, the town's name was changed from Bynum to Winder, in honor of Major John C. Winder, general manager of the Seaboard Railroad. In 1892 its name was again changed to Vass, honoring Major William Worrell Vass, who was at that time paymaster for the Seaboard Railroad. Vass remained as only a stopping place for the local train until 1907, when it was incorporated with Mr. Alex Gunter as mayor. During the 1910s the town took on new life, and through the efforts of men such as Mr. Angus Cameron the town began to grow into a thriving community.

Cameron, who arrived in the settlement in the 1870s from his home in Harnett County, and remained until his death in 1928, is acknowledged as the community's leading benefactor. He was on the first road commission, and was able to accomplish much in the way of better roads; he served on the Board of County Commissioners and years later as mayor of Vass. He was on the local school board for around half a century and built the first school building. Cameron erected the first brick buildings in Vass; he organized the Vass Cotton Mill Company and put up the mill building.

The Leslie-Taylor House was added to the National Register of Historic Places in 2008. Several other structures are eligible for the National Historic Register including: the Borst House, the Angus Cameron House, the John Cameron House, the Walter Graham House, the Vass Commercial Historic District, the Vass Cotton Mill, the Village Historic and the Walter Leslie House.

== Geography ==
Vass is in eastern Moore County along U.S. Route 1, which leads north 17 miles (27 km) to Sanford and southwest 9 miles (14 km) to Southern Pines. US-1 passes through the southeast side of the town as a four-lane freeway, while the center of Vass is served by U.S. Route 1 Business. North Carolina Highway 690 leads east-southeast from Vass 19 miles (31 km) to Spring Lake; Fayetteville is an additional 12 miles (19 km) to the southeast.

According to the U.S. Census Bureau, the town of Vass has a total area of 3.4 square miles (8.8 km^{2}), of which 0.02 square miles (0.05 km^{2}), or 0.65%, are water. The center of Vass sits on a low ridge which drains southwest toward the Little River and northeast to its tributary, Crane Creek. Via the Little River, Vass lies in the Cape Fear River watershed.

== Education ==
- Vass-Lakeview Elementary

== Demographics ==
Historical population
Census	Pop.	Note	%±
1910	273		—
1920	407		49.1%
1930	602		47.9%
1940	728		20.9%
1950	757		4.0%
1960	767		1.3%
1970	885		15.4%
1980	828		−6.4%
1990	670		−19.1%
2000	750		11.9%
2010	720		−4.0%
2020	952		32.2%
U.S. Decennial Census

As of the census of 2000, there were 750 people, 304 households, and 207 families residing in the town. The population density was 247.8 inhabitants per square mile (95.7/km^{2}). There were 351 housing units at an average density of 116.0 per square mile (44.8/km^{2}). The racial makeup of the town was 77.07% White, 17.33% African American, 1.07% Native American, 0.13% Asian, 2.13% from other races, and 2.27% from two or more races. Hispanic or Latino of any race were 4.53% of the population.

There were 304 households, out of which 31.9% had children under the age of 18 living with them, 46.4% were married couples living together, 16.1% had a female householder with no husband present, and 31.6% were non-families. 27.3% of all households were made up of individuals, and 9.9% had someone living alone who was 65 years of age or older. The average household size was 2.47 and the average family size was 2.96.

In the town, the population was spread out, with 24.4% under the age of 18, 9.3% from 18 to 24, 28.9% from 25 to 44, 21.2% from 45 to 64, and 16.1% who were 65 years of age or older. The median age was 38 years. For every 100 females, there were 88.4 males. For every 100 females age 18 and over, there were 88.4 males.

The median income for a household in the town was $27,188, and the median income for a family was $33,250. Males had a median income of $27,292 versus $23,125 for females. The per capita income for the town was $15,165. About 14.4% of families and 23.4% of the population were below the poverty line, including 22.9% of those under age 18 and 11.6% of those age 65 or over.
