= Nicks Creek (Little River tributary) =

Stream in North Carolina, USA

Nicks Creek Tributary to Little River
- Location of Nicks Creek mouth Nicks Creek (Little River tributary) (the United States)

Location
- Country: United States
- State: North Carolina
- County: Moore

Physical characteristics
- Source: Little River and Jackson Creek divide
  - location: about 0.5 miles east of West End, North Carolina
  - coordinates: 35°14′11″N 079°33′56″W
  - elevation: 530 ft (160 m)
- Mouth: Little River
  - location: about 1 mile west of Whispering Pines, North Carolina
  - coordinates: 35°15′55″N 079°23′54″W
  - elevation: 295 ft (90 m)
- Length: 11.13 mi (17.91 km)
- Basin size: 56.99 square miles (147.6 km^{2})
- Discharge
  - location: Little River
  - average: 33.26 cu ft/s (0.942 m^{3}/s) at mouth with Little River

Basin features
- Progression: Little River → Cape Fear River → Atlantic Ocean
- River system: Cape Fear River
- Tributaries
  - left: unnamed tributaries
  - right: Joes Fork
- Bridges: Beulah Hill Church Road, Murdocksville Road, US 15, NC 22, Michael Road

Nicks Creek is a 11.13 mi (17.91 km) long 3rd order tributary to Little River in Moore County, North Carolina.

== Variant names ==
According to the Geographic Names Information System, it has also been known historically as:

- Nick Creek

== Course ==
Nicks Creek rises on the Little River and Jackson Creek divide about 0.5 miles east of West End in Moore County, North Carolina. Nicks Creek then flows easterly to meet the Little River about 1 mile east of Whispering Pines.

== Watershed ==
Nicks Creek drains 56.99 square miles (147.6 km^{2}) of area, receives about 49.3 in/year of precipitation, has a topographic wetness index of 437.66 and is about 46% forested. Nicks Creek is classed as WS-III in terms of water quality.
