= Central Pines Regional Council =

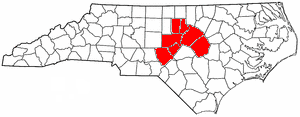
Counties within the North Carolina Region J Council of Governments

The Central Pines Regional Council (formerly Triangle J Council of Governments) is one of the 17 regional North Carolina Councils of Governments (Region J) established by the North Carolina General Assembly for the purpose of regional planning and administration. Headquartered in Durham, North Carolina, it serves Moore, Lee, Chatham, Orange, Durham, Wake, and Johnston counties. In 2023, TJCOG underwent a rebranding and name change, and is now known as CPRC.

== History ==
The CPRC was originally established in 1959 by the Research Triangle Foundation as the Research Triangle Regional Planning Commission. The commission's original members were Durham, Orange and Wake counties, and the cities of Chapel Hill, Durham, and Raleigh.

When the North Carolina General Assembly established 18 regional planning councils in 1972, the Research Triangle Regional Planning Commission was reorganized as the planning council for Region J, which consisted of Durham, Orange, Wake, Chatham, Johnston and Lee counties. Moore County was added when the planning commission for Region H was abolished.

== Membership ==
The following county and municipal governments are members of the Triangle J Council of Governments:

- Chatham County
  - Goldston
  - Pittsboro
  - Siler City
- Durham County
  - Durham
- Johnston County
  - Archer Lodge
  - Benson
  - Clayton
  - Kenly
  - Micro
  - Pine Level
  - Princeton
  - Selma
  - Smithfield
  - Wilson's Mills
- Lee County
  - Broadway
  - Sanford
- Moore County
  - Aberdeen
  - Cameron
  - Carthage
  - Foxfire
  - Pinebluff
  - Pinehurst
  - Robbins
  - Southern Pines
  - Taylortown
  - Vass
  - Whispering Pines
- Orange County
  - Carrboro
  - Chapel Hill
  - Hillsborough
- Wake County
  - Angier
  - Apex
  - Cary
  - Fuquay-Varina
  - Garner
  - Holly Springs
  - Knightdale
  - Morrisville
  - Raleigh
  - Rolesville
  - Wake Forest
  - Wendell
  - Zebulon
