= Wads Creek =

Stream in North Carolina, USA

Wads Creek Tributary to Little River
- Location of Wads Creek mouth Wads Creek (the United States)

Location
- Country: United States
- State: North Carolina
- County: Moore

Physical characteristics
- Source: McLendons Creek divide
  - location: pond at Pleasantville, North Carolina
  - coordinates: 35°18′49″N 079°28′03″W
  - elevation: 485 ft (148 m)
- Mouth: Little River
  - location: about 1.5 miles west-northwest of Whispering Pines, North Carolina
  - coordinates: 35°16′10″N 079°25′06″W
  - elevation: 309 ft (94 m)
- Length: 5.45 mi (8.77 km)
- Basin size: 9.79 square miles (25.4 km^{2})
- Discharge
  - location: Little River
  - average: 11.94 cu ft/s (0.338 m^{3}/s) at mouth with Little River

Basin features
- Progression: Little River → Cape Fear River → Atlantic Ocean
- River system: Cape Fear River
- Tributaries
  - left: unnamed tributaries
  - right: unnamed tributaries
- Bridges: Murdocksville Road, Brinkley Road, US 15, Little River Farm Blvd.

Wads Creek is a 5.45 mi (8.77 km) long 3rd order tributary to the Little River in Moore County, North Carolina.

== Course ==
Wads Creek rises on the McLendon Creek divide in a pond at Pleasantville in Moore County, North Carolina. Wads Creek then flows southeasterly to meet the Little River about 1.5 miles west-northwest of Whispering Pines.

== Watershed ==
Wads Creek drains 9.79 square miles (25.4 km^{2}) of area, receives about 49.1 in/year of precipitation, has a topographic wetness index of 432.61 and is about 57% forested.
