= Mill Creek (Little River tributary) =

Stream in North Carolina, USA

Mill Creek Tributary to Little River
- Location of Mill Creek mouth Mill Creek (Little River tributary) (the United States)

Location
- Country: United States
- State: North Carolina
- County: Moore

Physical characteristics
- Source: Aberdeen Creek divide
  - location: about 1.5 miles east of Pinehurst, North Carolina
  - coordinates: 35°12′12″N 079°25′03″W
  - elevation: 470 ft (140 m)
- Mouth: Little River
  - location: about 0.25 miles east of Lakeview, North Carolina
  - coordinates: 35°14′32″N 079°17′50″W
  - elevation: 246 ft (75 m)
- Length: 7.80 mi (12.55 km)
- Basin size: 20.08 square miles (52.0 km^{2})
- Discharge
  - location: Little River
  - average: 23.90 cu ft/s (0.677 m^{3}/s) at mouth with Little River

Basin features
- Progression: Little River → Cape Fear River → Atlantic Ocean
- River system: Cape Fear River
- Tributaries
  - left: unnamed tributaries
  - right: McDeeds Creek
- Waterbodies: numerous unnamed reservoirs Crystal Lake
- Bridges: Hunter Trail, Central Drive, Santee Road, Niagara-Carthage Road, Camp Easter Road, Aiken Road

Mill Creek is a 7.80 mi (12.55 km) long 3rd order tributary to the Little River in Moore County, North Carolina.

== Course ==
Mill Creek rises on the Aberdeen Creek divide about 1.5 miles east of Pinehurst in Moore County, North Carolina. Mill Creek then flows northeasterly to meet the Little River about 0.25 miles east of Lakeview.

== Watershed ==
Mill Creek drains 20.08 square miles (52.0 km^{2}) of area, receives about 49.2 in/year of precipitation, has a topographic wetness index of 448.46 and is about 34% forested.
