= Councils of governments in North Carolina =

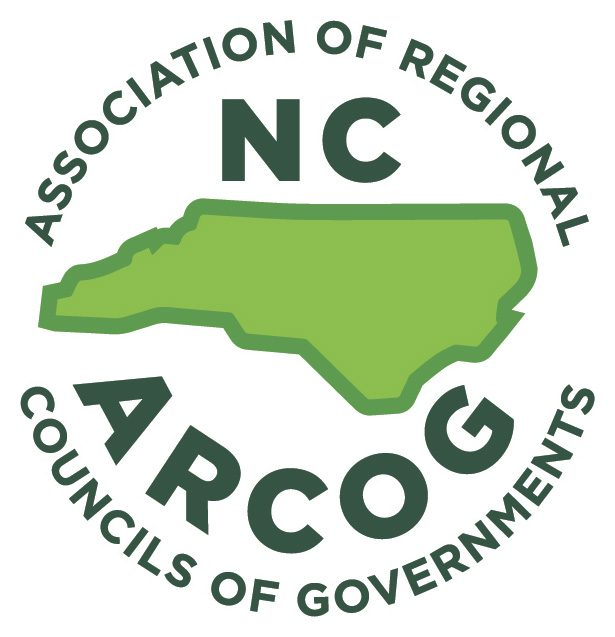
North Carolina Association of Regional Councils of Governments logo

The North Carolina Councils of Government (or the Regional Councils of Government) are voluntary associations of county and municipal governments, established by the North Carolina General Assembly in 1972 that serve as an avenue for local governments across North Carolina to discuss issues that are particular to their region. In banding together at the regional level, the voice of one community becomes the voice of many, thus providing a better opportunity for those issues to be addressed. The majority of citizens and local governments in North Carolina are represented by regional councils, making them an increasingly important facet of local government operations.

== History ==
Regional councils benefit leaders in the community both elected and not, as well as the citizenry, in the way that these councils foster regional economic competitiveness. Regional councils work to address the many issues that communities are facing today, often these issues are those that are critical to a community's overall well being including transportation, air quality and water quality.

Addressing regional issues such as the aforementioned, can be a difficult task. For this reason collaboration among the public, civic, nonprofit and private sectors in various types of regional organizations has remained extremely appealing for those communities wishing to remain competitive at the regional level.

Typically a region can contain several different kinds of regional organizations. One of which is the regional council of government. A regional council of government is a broad based, voluntary public organization that aids local member governments through a variety of services, through its role as a regional forum, and through a comprehensive work program. Many early regional councils evolved from the private, nonprofit regional planning organizations of the 1920s, and even more were formed in the years following World War II.

Federal legislation passed in the mid-1960s and early 1970s laid the groundwork for the formation of most regional councils. This legislation was inclusive of federal programs for comprehensive planning as well as intergovernmental cooperation. By 1977 it was estimated that the Federal government was providing approximately 75% of regional council budgets. This figure however, dropped dramatically by 1988 as federal funding was cut sharply, and it is estimated to have accounted for only 45% of regional council budgets at this time.

As of 1998 the National Association of Regional Councils directory lists 501 councils in 48 states. This is a decrease of nearly 20% from 1976, which in part is due to regional councils absorbing sub-regional councils or combining with councils in adjoining regions. Of these 501 regional councils, it is reported that: 322 are designated as economic development districts, 304 serve as review agencies for applications for state or federal funding, 245 conduct land use planning, 277 allocate federal and state revolving loan funds for wastewater and drinking water facilities, 181 conduct regional transportation planning as MPO's (Metropolitan Planning Organizations) and 163 provide services for the elderly.

== Regional councils in North Carolina ==
In 1995 there were 18 regional councils of government in North Carolina. In the years following, this number decreased to 17 and today North Carolina calls itself home to 16 regional councils of government. Regional councils in North Carolina are committed to working together. In 2010 the seventeen regional councils existing at that time signed an inter-regional cooperative agreement that established a policy to enhance their value by sharing member resources and capacity to deliver services to the state of North Carolina. This agreement also endorses regional councils, to carry out activities in regions outside their boundaries with consent when those services are to benefit the region and the state. Regional boundaries correspond to county borders, with each council being made up of both county and municipal governments. Although the number of regional councils in North Carolina has decreased over the years, the number of citizens served by the councils continues to rise. The reduction of regional councils in North Carolina is a trend that appears to mirror that on the national level, which decreased 20% between 1976 and 1988, due in large part to regional councils combining with one another and absorbing smaller sub regional councils. As of July 1, 2007 it is reported that the number of local governments served by regional councils in North Carolina has increased by 16% since 1994. Throughout this same time period the number of citizens served by regional councils has increased by 35% or approximately 2.3 million. This equates to 92% of local governments and 97% of all North Carolina citizens being represented by regional councils as of July 1, 2007.

== Services provided by regional councils ==
Regional councils of government, or COGs for short, provide many services for their members. Planning, technical assistance, geographic information systems (GIS), and grant writing are the four most prevalent in the State of North Carolina. Much like the increase in representation from 1994 to 2007, the number of services provided by COGs has increased as well. In 1995 it was reported that only 7 of 18 COGs in existence at the time provided all four of the aforementioned services. In 2008, the number of COGs providing all four of the services increased to 17 out of 17 or 100%. Today it is reported that all regional councils in North Carolina administer the federal and state aging programs in cooperation with the NC department for aging. Aside from aging, regional councils in North Carolina provide numerous other federal and state programs. They administer transportation planning, CDBG grants, HUD grants, data collection, housing programs and more. These programs are made possible through partnerships between North Carolina regional councils and federal and state agencies including United States Department of Housing and Urban Development, Economic Development Administration, United States Environmental Protection Agency, NC Departments of Commerce, North Carolina Department of Environmental Quality (DENR), United States Department of Health and Human Services, North Carolina Department of Transportation and the North Carolina Rural Center.

The top four services that were cited as being most important to local governments as of 2007 were as follows in order: (1) Economic Development and Planning, (2) Grant Writing and Administration, (3) Transportation Planning and (4) Regional water resources planning. Within the next 5–10 years however, these priorities are expected to change. The top four services that were cited as being most important to local governments over the next 5–10 years are as follows in order: (1) Regional water resources planning, (2)Transportation Planning, (3)Community and Economic Development Planning and (4) Grant Writing and Administration.

== Regional council budgets ==
Although representation and number of services provided by COGs has increased over the years, the budgets of these councils have not followed suit. In general, total budgets have increased, but per capita budgets have decreased substantially between the years of 1994 and 2007. This is due to the fact that the population of North Carolina has increased at a faster rate than the COG budgets.

Depending on geographical size, population and number of services provided, the budgets of regional councils in North Carolina vary greatly. In 2007 Region R or the counties of: Camden, Chowan, Currituck, Dare, Gates, Hyde, Pasquotank, Perquimans, Tyrrell and Washington had the smallest budget of all regional councils in the state at approximately $4.4 million. Region I or the counties of: Davie, Forsyth, Stokes, Surry and Yadkin had the largest budget of all regional councils at approximately $15.2 million. Between 1994 and 2007, the average total budget for North Carolina COG's increased 11% from $8 million to $8.9 million. Direct State Contribution to regional councils of government decreased by 27% during this same time period (1994–2007) in which the average total budget increase was realized. From 1994-2007 North Carolina saw a population increase of 26%. This increase in population, coupled with the substantial decrease in state contribution, led to an average per capita budget decrease in regional councils of 39% or from $42 to $26 during this time period.

Regional Councils receive the bulk of their funds from federal and state sources. In 1994, it was reported that approximately 92% ($95 million) of $103 million received by regional councils was from State and Federal funding. Approximately 84% of these State and Federal funds were passed through to local governments or other agencies to provide services for target populations such as those needing housing assistance or the elderly. The remaining 7% or approximately $8 million in revenues received by regional councils came from local funding.

== State enabling statutes ==
NCGS 160A-470 enables regional councils of government to be established in North Carolina. Furthermore, this statute lays the groundwork for the formation of regional councils of government in North Carolina, and extends an open invitation for participation to governments in adjoining states. The statute reads as follows: NCGS 160A-470 "(a) Any two or more units of local government may create a regional council of governments by adopting identical concurrent resolutions to that effect in accordance with the provisions and procedures of this Part. To the extent permitted by the laws of its state, a local government in a state adjoining North Carolina may participate in regional councils of governments organized under this Part to the same extent as if it were located in this State. The concurrent resolutions creating a regional council of governments and any amendments thereto, will be referred to in this Part as the "charter" of the regional council".

NCGS 160-475 goes on to specifically list the powers that the charter confers upon regional councils. The powers as contained in this statute are as follows:

- "(1) To apply for, accept, receive, and dispense funds and grants made available to it by the State of North Carolina or any agency thereof, the United States of America or any agency thereof, any unit of local government (whether or not a member of the council), and any private or civic agency.
- (2) To employ personnel
- (3) To contract with consultants
- (4) To contract with the State of North Carolina, any other state, the United States of America, or any agency thereof for services
- (5) To study regional governmental problems, including matters affecting health, safety, welfare, education, recreation, economic conditions, regional planning and regional development
- (6) To promote cooperative arrangements and coordinated action among its member governments
- (7) To make recommendations for review and action to its member governments and other public agencies which perform functions within the region in which its member governments are located (7a) For the purpose of meeting the regional council's office space and program needs, to acquire real property by purchase, gift or otherwise to improve that property. The regional council may pledge real property as security for indebtedness used to finance acquisition of that property or for improvements to that real property, subject to approval by the Local Government Commission as required under G.S. 159-153. A regional council may not exercise the power of eminent domain.
- (8) Any other powers that are exercised or capable of exercise by its member governments and desirable for dealing with problems of mutual concern to the extent such powers are specifically delegated to it from time to time by resolution of the governing board of each of its member governments which are affected thereby, provided that no regional council of governments shall have the authority to construct or purchase building, or acquire title to real property, except for the purposes permitted under subdivision (7a) of this section in order to exercise the authority granted by Chapter 260 of the Session Laws of 1979."

== Regional Councils ==
Region	Name	Counties	Map
A	Southwestern Commission	Cherokee, Clay, Graham, Swain, Haywood, Jackson, and Macon	
B	Land-of-Sky Regional Council	Madison, Buncombe, Henderson, and Transylvania	
C	Foothills Regional Commission	Polk, Rutherford, McDowell, and Cleveland	
D	High Country Council of Governments	Yancey, Mitchell, Avery, Watauga, Ashe, Alleghany, and Wilkes	
E	Western Piedmont Council of Governments	Caldwell, Burke, Alexander, and Catawba (organized in 1968)	
F	Centralina Regional Councils	Iredell, Rowan, Lincoln, Gaston, Mecklenburg, Cabarrus, Stanly, Union, and Anson counties, as well as 74 municipalities within these nine counties.	
G	Piedmont Triad Regional Council	Alamance, Caswell, Davidson, Guilford, Montgomery, Randolph, Rockingham, Davie, Forsyth, Stokes, Surry, and Yadkin	
J	Central Pines Regional Council	Moore, Lee, Chatham, Orange, Durham, Wake, Johnston	
K	Kerr-Tar Regional Council of Governments	Person, Granville, Vance, Warren, and Franklin	
L	Upper Coastal Plain Council of Governments	Wilson, Nash, Edgecombe, Halifax, and Northampton	
M	Mid-Carolina Council of Governments	Harnett, Cumberland, and Sampson	
N	Lumber River Council of Governments	Richmond, Scotland, Hoke, Robeson, and Bladen	
O	Cape Fear Council of Governments	Brunswick, Columbus, New Hanover, and Pender	
P	Eastern Carolina Council of Governments	Onslow, Duplin, Wayne, Greene, Lenoir, Jones, Craven, Carteret, and Pamlico	
Q	Mid-East Commission	Hertford, Bertie, Martin, Pitt, and Beaufort	
R	Albemarle Commission	Gates, Chowan, Perquimans, Pasquotank, Camden, Currituck, Washington, Tyrrell, Dare, and Hyde	

== Former Regional Councils ==
Region	Name	Counties	Notes	Map
G	Piedmont Triad Council of Governments	Davidson, Montgomery, Randolph, Guilford, Rockingham, Caswell, Alamance	The Northwest Piedmont Council of Governments and the Piedmont Triad Council of Governments merged in 2011 to form the Piedmont Triad Regional Council, Region G.	
H	Pee Dee Council of Governments	Anson, Montgomery, Moore, Richmond	Dissolved in 2001. Anson County joined the Centralina Regional Councils, Montgomery County joined the Piedmont Triad Council of Governments, Moore County joined the Central Pines Regional Council, and Richmond County joined the Lumber River Council of Governments.	
I	Northwest Piedmont Council of Governments	Surry, Stokes, Forsyth, Yadkin, Davie	The Northwest Piedmont Council of Governments and the Piedmont Triad Council of Governments merged in 2011 to form the Piedmont Triad Regional Council, Region G.	
