= Jackson Springs, North Carolina =

- Census-designated place
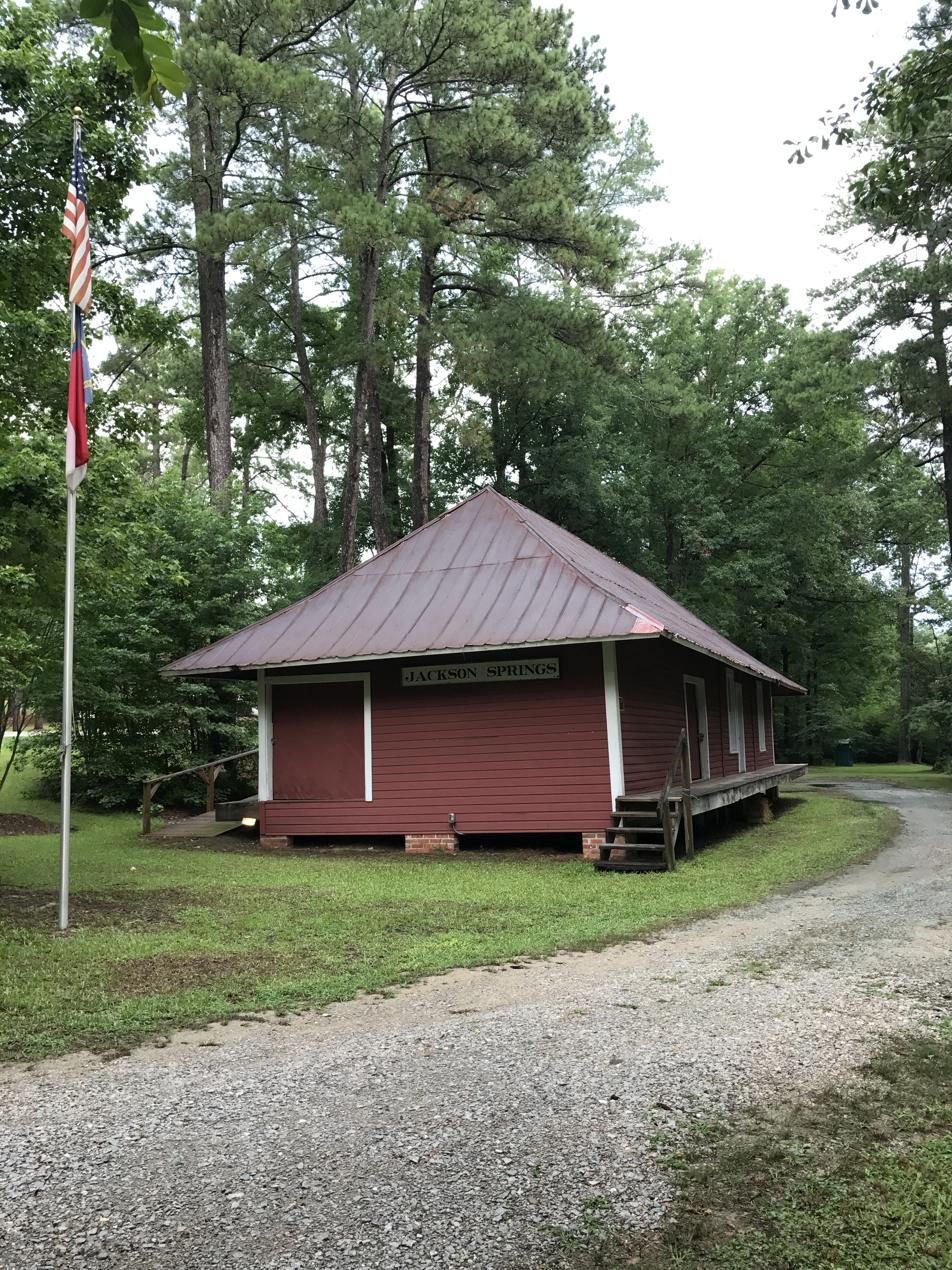

- Location within North Carolina Location within the United States
- Coordinates: 35°12′46″N 79°37′47″W
- Country: United States
- State: North Carolina
- County: Moore

Area
  - Total: 1.59 sq mi (4.13 km^{2})
  - Land: 1.59 sq mi (4.13 km^{2})
  - Water: 0 sq mi (0.00 km^{2})
- Elevation: 505 ft (154 m)

Population (2020)
  - Total: 154
  - Density: 96.5/sq mi (37.26/km^{2})
- Time zone: UTC-5 (Eastern (EST))
  - Summer (DST): UTC-4 (EDT)
- ZIP code: 27281
- Area codes: 910, 472
- GNIS feature ID: 2812798
- FIPS Code: 37-34160

Jackson Springs is an unincorporated community and census-designated place (CDP) in Moore County, North Carolina, United States. It was first listed as a CDP in the 2020 census with a population of 154.

== History ==
Jackson Springs was settled in the 1700s by the Jackson family, after which the locale was named. It grew into a mineral spa town with a large hotel. The community declined after the hotel was destroyed by fire in 1933.

== Geography ==
Jackson Springs is in southwestern Moore County along North Carolina Highway 73, which leads northeast 4 miles (6 km) to West End and southwest 7 miles (11 km) to Interstate 73/74 at Plain View. Pinehurst is 10 miles (16 km) to the east via NC 73 and NC 211.

According to the U.S. Census Bureau, the Jackson Springs CDP has an area of 1.6 square miles (4.1 km^{2}), all land. Jackson Creek forms the eastern border of the community. The creek is a south-flowing tributary of Drowning Creek, the headwaters of the Lumber River.

== Notable people ==
- Harris Blake, North Carolina state senator; born in Jackson Springs

== Demographics ==
Historical population
Census	Pop.	Note	%±
2020	154		—
U.S. Decennial Census; 2020

=== 2020 census ===
Jackson Springs CDP, North Carolina – Demographic Profile (NH = Non-Hispanic)
Race / Ethnicity	Pop 2020	% 2020
White alone (NH)	99	64.29%
Black or African American alone (NH)	28	18.18%
Native American or Alaska Native alone (NH)	1	0.65%
Asian alone (NH)	2	1.30%
Pacific Islander alone (NH)	1	0.65%
Some Other Race alone (NH)	2	1.30%
Mixed Race/Multi-Racial (NH)	10	6.49%
Hispanic or Latino (any race)	11	7.14%
Total	154	100.00%

Note: the US Census treats Hispanic/Latino as an ethnic category. This table excludes Latinos from the racial categories and assigns them to a separate category. Hispanics/Latinos can be of any race.
