= Horse Creek (Drowning Creek tributary) =

Stream in North Carolina, USA

Horse Creek Tributary to Drowning Creek
- Location of Horse Creek mouth Horse Creek (Drowning Creek tributary) (the United States)

Location
- Country: United States
- State: North Carolina
- County: Moore
- Village: Pinehurst

Physical characteristics
- Source: Joes Fork divide
  - location: about 0.25 miles southwest of Pinehurst, North Carolina
  - coordinates: 35°11′26″N 079°29′07″W
  - elevation: 480 ft (150 m)
- Mouth: Drowning Creek
  - location: about 2 miles southwest of Addor, North Carolina
  - coordinates: 35°03′50″N 079°30′25″W
  - elevation: 279 ft (85 m)
- Length: 10.08 mi (16.22 km)
- Basin size: 43.51 square miles (112.7 km^{2})
- Discharge
  - location: Drowning Creek
  - average: 50.24 cu ft/s (1.423 m^{3}/s) at mouth with Drowning Creek

Basin features
- Progression: generally south
- River system: Lumber River
- Tributaries
  - left: unnamed tributaries
  - right: Deep Creek
- Waterbodies: Pinehurst Lake
- Bridges: Burning Tree Road, Diamond Head Drive S, Linden Road, Roseland Road

Horse Creek is a 10.08-mile-long (16.22 km) third-order tributary to Drowning Creek (Lumber River) in Moore County, North Carolina. The water of Horse Creek is classed as WS-II and HQW (High-Quality Water).

== Course ==
Horse Creek rises on the Joes Fork divide about 0.25 miles (0.40 km) southwest of Pinehurst in Moore County, North Carolina. Horse Creek then takes a southerly course through numerous swamps to meet Drowning Creek about 2 miles (3.2 km) southwest of Addor.

== Watershed ==
Horse Creek drains 43.51 square miles (112.68 km^{2}) of area, receives about 49.2 inches per year (1,249 mm/a) of precipitation, has a topographic wetness index of 466.77 and is about 37% forested.
