= James Creek (Little River tributary) =

Stream in North Carolina, USA

James Creek Tributary to Little River
- Location of James Creek mouth James Creek (Little River tributary) (the United States)

Location
- Country: United States
- State: North Carolina
- County: Moore; Hoke

Physical characteristics
- Source: Jennie Creek divide
  - location: about 1 mile south of Southern Pines, North Carolina in Weymouth Woods
  - coordinates: 35°09′05″N 079°22′45″W
  - elevation: 415 ft (126 m)
- Mouth: Little River
  - location: about 2 miles northeast of Inverness, North Carolina
  - coordinates: 35°11′51″N 079°13′00″W
  - elevation: 208 ft (63 m)
- Length: 13.50 mi (21.73 km)
- Basin size: 34.07 square miles (88.2 km^{2})
- Discharge
  - location: Little River
  - average: 38.17 cu ft/s (1.081 m^{3}/s) at mouth with Little River

Basin features
- Progression: Little River → Cape Fear River → Atlantic Ocean
- River system: Cape Fear River
- Tributaries
  - left: unnamed tributaries
  - right: Silver Run; Tuckahoe Creek
- Bridges: Valhalla Road, Connecticut Avenue, Tremont Street

James Creek is a 13.50-mile-long (21.73 km) third-order tributary to the Little River in Hoke and Moore Counties, North Carolina.

== Course ==
James Creek rises on the Jennie Creek divide about one mile south of Southern Pines in Moore County, North Carolina. James Creek then flows northeasterly to meet the Little River about two miles northeast of Inverness.

== Watershed ==
James Creek drains 34.07 square miles (88.2 km^{2}) of area, receives about 47.8 in/year of precipitation, has a topographic wetness index of 456.69 and is about 55% forested.
