= Taylortown, North Carolina =

- Town
- Location in Moore County and the state of North Carolina
- Coordinates: 35°12′53″N 79°29′30″W
- Country: United States
- State: North Carolina
- County: Moore

Area
  - Total: 1.35 sq mi (3.49 km^{2})
  - Land: 1.35 sq mi (3.49 km^{2})
  - Water: 0 sq mi (0.00 km^{2})
- Elevation: 410 ft (120 m)

Population (2020)
  - Total: 634
  - Density: 470.4/sq mi (181.62/km^{2})
- Time zone: UTC-5 (Eastern (EST))
  - Summer (DST): UTC-4 (EDT)
- ZIP Codes: 27376 (West End); 28374 (Pinehurst)
- FIPS code: 37-66980
- GNIS feature ID: 2406721
- Website: https://www.taylortownnc.gov/

Taylortown is a town in Moore County, North Carolina, United States. The population was 634 as of the 2020 census, down from 722 in 2010. It is bordered by nearby Pinehurst.

== Geography ==
Taylortown is in southern Moore County and is bordered to the south and east by the village of Pinehurst. North Carolina Highway 211 runs along the southern border of the town, leading east 2 miles (3 km) to U.S. Routes 15 and 501 and northwest 6 miles (10 km) to West End. Aberdeen is 7 miles (11 km) to the south, Southern Pines is the same distance to the southeast, and Carthage, the Moore county seat, is 12 miles (19 km) to the north.

According to the U.S. Census Bureau, the town of Taylortown has a total area of 1.35 square miles (3.50 km^{2}), all land. The town is drained by Joes Fork, a northeast-flowing tributary of Nicks Creek and part of the Little River watershed leading to the Cape Fear River.

== Demographics ==
Historical population
Census	Pop.	Note	%±
1990	543		—
2000	845		55.6%
2010	722		−14.6%
2020	634		−12.2%
U.S. Decennial Census

As of the census of 2000, there were 956 people, 308 households, and 226 families residing in the town. The population density was 702.4 inhabitants per square mile (271.2/km^{2}). There were 337 housing units at an average density of 280.1 per square mile (108.1/km^{2}). The racial makeup of the town was 27.46% White, 69.47% African American, 0.47% Native American, 0.24% Asian, 0.36% from other races, and 2.01% from two or more races. Hispanic or Latino of any race were 0.47% of the population.

There were 308 households, out of which 36.0% had children under the age of 18 living with them, 46.1% were married couples living together, 21.1% had a female householder with no husband present, and 26.3% were non-families. 21.4% of all households were made up of individuals, and 10.1% had someone living alone who was 65 years of age or older. The average household size was 2.74 and the average family size was 3.19.

In the town, the population was spread out, with 28.3% under the age of 18, 6.7% from 18 to 24, 32.0% from 25 to 44, 20.6% from 45 to 64, and 12.4% who were 65 years of age or older. The median age was 35 years. For every 100 females, there were 91.6 males. For every 100 females age 18 and over, there were 87.6 males.

The median income for a household in the town was $30,781, and the median income for a family was $35,739. Males had a median income of $32,625 versus $20,125 for females. The per capita income for the town was $16,889. About 12.0% of families and 14.8% of the population were below the poverty line, including 14.3% of those under age 18 and 20.7% of those age 65 or over.
