= Moore County substation attack =

2022 shooting of electrical substations in North Carolina, US

- Location: Moore County, North Carolina, US
- Date: December 3, 2022 c. 7:00 p.m. (EST)
- Target: Duke Energy substations
- Attack type: Sabotage
- Weapon: Firearms
- Deaths: 1

On December 3, 2022, a shooting attack was carried out on two electrical distribution substations located in Moore County, North Carolina, United States. Damage from the attack left up to 40,000 residential and business customers without electrical power, causing the death of one woman. Initial estimates were that up to four days could be required to fully restore power in the area. A state of emergency and corresponding curfew were enacted by local government officials in the wake of the incident.

== Background ==
Less than two weeks prior to the Moore County substation incident, the Federal Bureau of Investigation (FBI) had sent a report to private industry in which they stated that there had been an increase in reported threats to electric infrastructure from people who espouse "racially or ethnically motivated violent extremist ideology", with an aim of creating civil disorder and inspiring further violence. The Department of Homeland Security cited

a 14-page document released in a Telegram channel favored by accelerationist groups seeking to speed the overthrow of the US government featured a white supremacist instruction guide to low-tech attacks meant to bring chaos, including how to attack a power grid with guns.

While it is unclear whether such threats are directly associated with this attack, government officials have previously expressed concern over the possibility of violent extremists attacking the electrical grid. Prior to the Moore County attack, other attacks on the electrical grid had occurred in Coyote, California in 2013 (Metcalf Energy Center), in Arkansas in 2013, in Utah in 2016, and in Washington and Oregon (dates undisclosed).

== Attack ==
According to Moore County Sheriff Ronnie Fields, a Duke Energy power substation was severely damaged by gunfire in Carthage at around 7 p.m. Gunfire was later directed at a second substation in West End, ultimately resulting in a loss of electrical power to the majority of the county. A journalist from a local newspaper reported that one of the substations' gates had been damaged and was lying in an access road, with the pole holding the gate having been snapped off at the ground.

Outages began starting just after 7 p.m. on December 3 in Moore County and spread to central and southern parts of the county, with roughly 36,000 customers reported to be without power. Duke Energy officials indicated that significant, serious damage had occurred to equipment located at the substations and that repairs could take several days.

== Investigation ==
The FBI released a poster appealing for information on the attack on December 7.

In addition to the Moore County Sheriff's Department, the North Carolina State Bureau of Investigation, the FBI, and police departments from all eleven municipalities in Moore County are participating in the investigation. The Office of Cybersecurity, Energy Security, and Emergency Response (CESER) of the Department of Energy is also reported to be assisting.

Investigators revealed that they had recovered about two dozen shell-casings, described as being from a "high powered rifle", from the attack sites. These casings were expected to be used to query the National Integrated Ballistic Information Network for possible matches with casings fired from the same weapon at other crime scenes. The casings, some of the only physical evidence available, were also being looked at as a starting point which could lead to other evidence such as tire tracks or shoe prints.

On December 7, 2022, Governor Roy Cooper announced that a reward of up to $75,000 was being offered for information leading to an arrest and conviction in the case. The money consists of three separate $25,000 rewards, offered by the State of North Carolina, Duke Energy, and Moore County.

=== Motive ===
Officials have described the attack as "targeted" and "intentional, willful and malicious" but did not immediately provide any information on suspects or a motive for the attack.

After the incident, numerous posts on the internet speculated that the attack was an attempt to disrupt a local drag show that was taking place in the nearby town of Southern Pines that evening; however, these claims are unconfirmed and disputed.

By December 7, investigators were focusing on two possible motives for the attack. One scenario relates to known online writings by domestic extremists, which encourage attacks on critical infrastructure; the other relates to anti-LGBTQ+ activity. Investigators said they still have no evidence specifically tying the attack to the contemporaneous drag show, but the timing of the two incidents, as well as a general growth in tension around LGBTQ+ events, leads them to consider a possible connection.

== Aftermath ==
It was estimated that by December 6, about 35,000 Moore County residents were still without power, and the timeline for completing repairs and restoring power county-wide was revised from December 8 to midnight December 7. By the morning of December 7, the number of affected residents without power was down to about 23,000, and power had been restored to the Moore County hospital. Additionally, the Duke Energy website stated "All substation equipment damaged from recent vandalism has either been fully repaired or replaced." By 4 p.m. on December 7, the number of customers remaining without power had dropped to approximately 1,200. As a result, it was announced that the curfew would be permanently lifted as of 5 a.m. on the morning of December 8.

As a result of the power outage, Moore County Regional Hospital was forced to operate on generator power. The town of Southern Pines also had to resort to operating their sewer and water services on backup generators. Residents of the area were asked to stay off the roads if possible or proceed with caution due to the absence of traffic lights.

On December 4, a curfew was placed in effect for Moore County, from 9 p.m. until 5 a.m. The nightly curfew was expected to remain in effect until the power was restored. A shelter was established at the Moore County Sports Complex, and Moore County schools were ordered closed from December 5 through December 8 as a result of the power outage.

A Moore County resident died during the power outage and investigators are determining whether the death was related to the outage, which could have implications for any criminal charges.

On August 30, 2023, the death of Karin Zoanelli, an 87-year-old woman who died during the power outage, was ruled a homicide by the Office of the Chief Medical Examiner of North Carolina. A resident of Pinehurst, Zoanelli suffered from chronic lung problems and was dependent on an oxygen machine to breathe at night. The machine was rendered inoperable after her house lost power which contributed to her death, according to the medical examiner.

== Responses ==
During a press conference shortly after the attacks, Moore County Sheriff Ronnie Fields claimed the substations were targeted and that attack was intentional. Fields also claimed that the perpetrators most likely knew what they were doing but did not state that the attacks may have been domestic terrorism. The sheriff also reported that his office has not been able to tie anything back to a drag show in Southern Pines, scheduled around the time the power went out, thereby addressing a rumor that began on social media.

U.S. National Security Council spokesman John Kirby advised that the White House was monitoring the situation closely, and emphasized the importance of shoring up the security of the infrastructure.

North Carolina Governor Roy Cooper issued a statement via Twitter, saying, "An attack like this on critical infrastructure is a serious, intentional crime and I expect state and federal authorities to thoroughly investigate and bring those responsible to justice."

== See also ==
- Electrical grid security in the United States
- Metcalf sniper attack
