= HQW =

HQW may refer to:

- High-Quality Water, classification used in Horse Creek (Drowning Creek tributary), United States
- HQW Architects, firm in the restoration of Waldwick station, United States
- HQW Precision GmbH, German parent company of Barden Corporation
