= Horse Creek (Little River tributary) =

Stream in North Carolina, USA

Horse Creek Tributary to Little River
- Location of Horse Creek mouth Horse Creek (Little River tributary) (the United States)

Location
- Country: United States
- State: North Carolina
- County: Hoke

Physical characteristics
- Source: Flat Creek divide
  - location: about 2 miles south of Inverness, North Carolina
  - coordinates: 35°09′33″N 079°13′49″W
  - elevation: 360 ft (110 m)
- Mouth: Little River
  - location: about 2 miles southwest of Mount Pleasant, North Carolina
  - coordinates: 35°11′32″N 079°11′54″W
  - elevation: 194 ft (59 m)
- Length: 2.49 mi (4.01 km)
- Basin size: 3.64 square miles (9.4 km^{2})
- Discharge
  - location: Little River
  - average: 4.30 cu ft/s (0.122 m^{3}/s) at mouth with Little River

Basin features
- Progression: Little River → Cape Fear River → Atlantic Ocean
- River system: Cape Fear River
- Tributaries
  - left: unnamed tributaries
  - right: unnamed tributaries
- Bridges: Manchester Road

Horse Creek is a 2.49 mi (4.01 km) long 2nd order tributary to the Little River in Hoke County, North Carolina.

== Course ==
Horse Creek rises on the Flat Creek divide about 2 miles south of Inverness in Hoke County, North Carolina. Horse Creek then flows northeasterly to meet the Little River about 2 miles southwest of Mt. Pleasant.

== Watershed ==
Horse Creek drains 3.64 square miles (9.4 km^{2}) of area, receives about 47.9 in/year of precipitation, has a topographic wetness index of 436.46 and is about 65% forested.
