= Crane Creek (Little River tributary) =

Stream in North Carolina, USA

Crane Creek Tributary to Little River
- Location of Crane Creek mouth Crane Creek (Little River tributary) (the United States)

Location
- Country: United States
- State: North Carolina
- County: Moore

Physical characteristics
- Source: Crowley Creek divide
  - location: about 2 miles east of Carthage, North Carolina
  - coordinates: 35°21′45″N 079°21′24″W
  - elevation: 445 ft (136 m)
- Mouth: Little River
  - location: about 1 mile south of Mt. Pleasant, North Carolina
  - coordinates: 35°11′07″N 079°10′06″W
  - elevation: 184 ft (56 m)
- Length: 23.41 mi (37.67 km)
- Basin size: 100.22 square miles (259.6 km^{2})
- Discharge
  - location: Little River
  - average: 107.47 cu ft/s (3.043 m^{3}/s) at mouth with Little River

Basin features
- Progression: Little River → Cape Fear River → Atlantic Ocean
- River system: Cape Fear River
- Tributaries
  - left: Herds Creek; Little Crane Creek; Big Branch; Slash Branch; Beaver Creek; Horse Branch; Cypress Creek; Little Creek
  - right: Dunhams Creek
- Waterbodies: Lake Surf
- Bridges: US 15-501, NC 24-27, Scott Road, Grady Road, Shaw Road, US 1 Business, US 1, McLauchlin Road, Loblolly Drive, Lobelia Road, McGill Road, McPherson Road

Crane Creek is a 23.41 mi (37.67 km) long 4th order tributary to the Little River in Moore County, North Carolina.

== Variant names ==
According to the Geographic Names Information System, it has also been known historically as:

- Crains Creek
- Little Crains Creek
- North Fork Crains Creek

== Course ==
Crane Creek rises on the Crowley Creek divide about 2 miles east of Carthage in Moore County, North Carolina. Crane Creek then flows southeast to meet the Little River about 1 mile south of Mt. Pleasant.

== Watershed ==
Crane Creek drains 100.22 square miles (259.6 km^{2}) of area, receives about 48.2 in/year of precipitation, has a topographic wetness index of 454.64 and is about 39% forested.
