= Metcalf Energy Center =

Natural gas-fired power station in South San Jose, California

Coordinates: 37°13′14″N 121°44′45″W

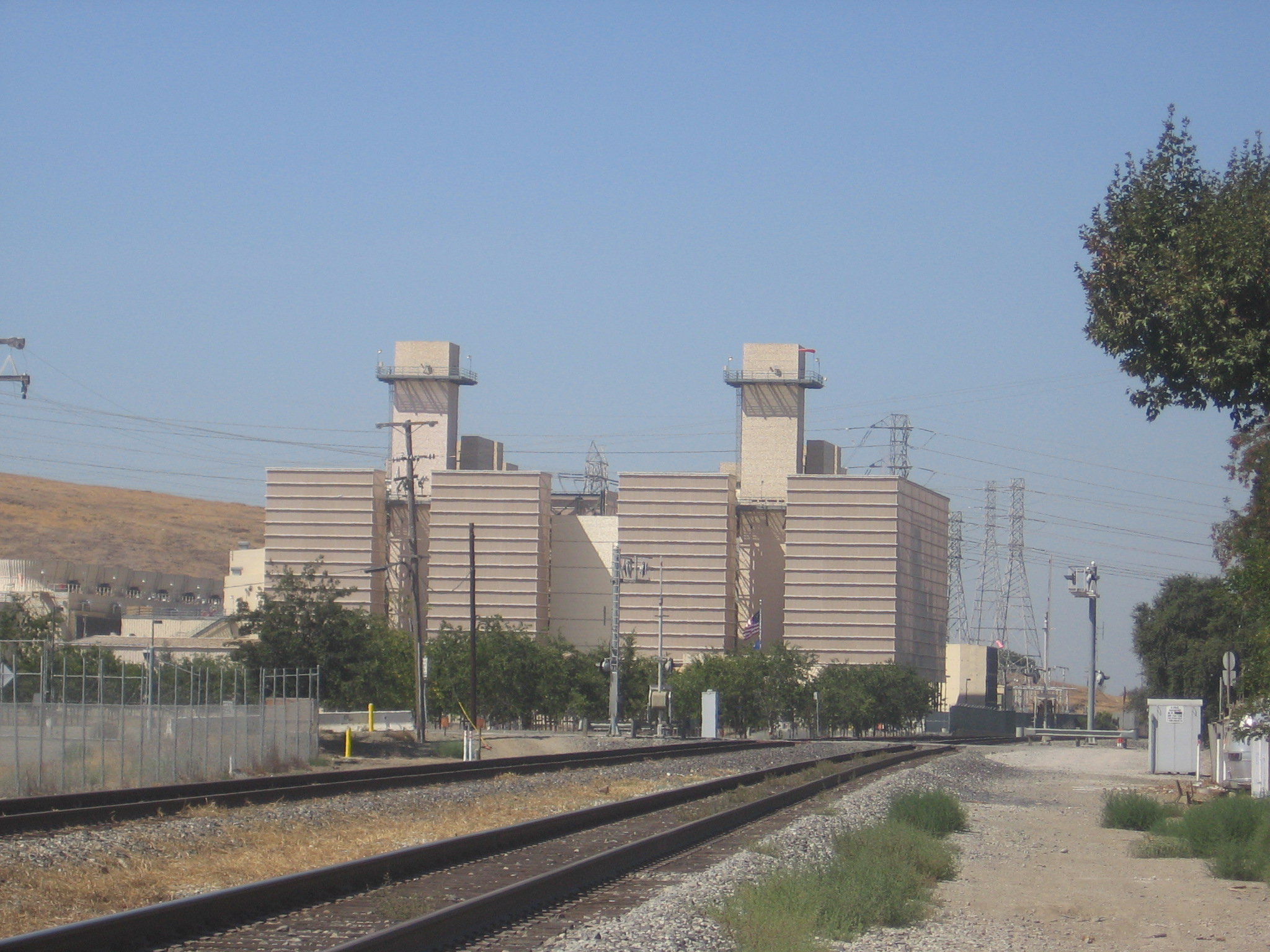
View of plants thermal condenser towers from Coyote Creek Trail, September 22, 2012

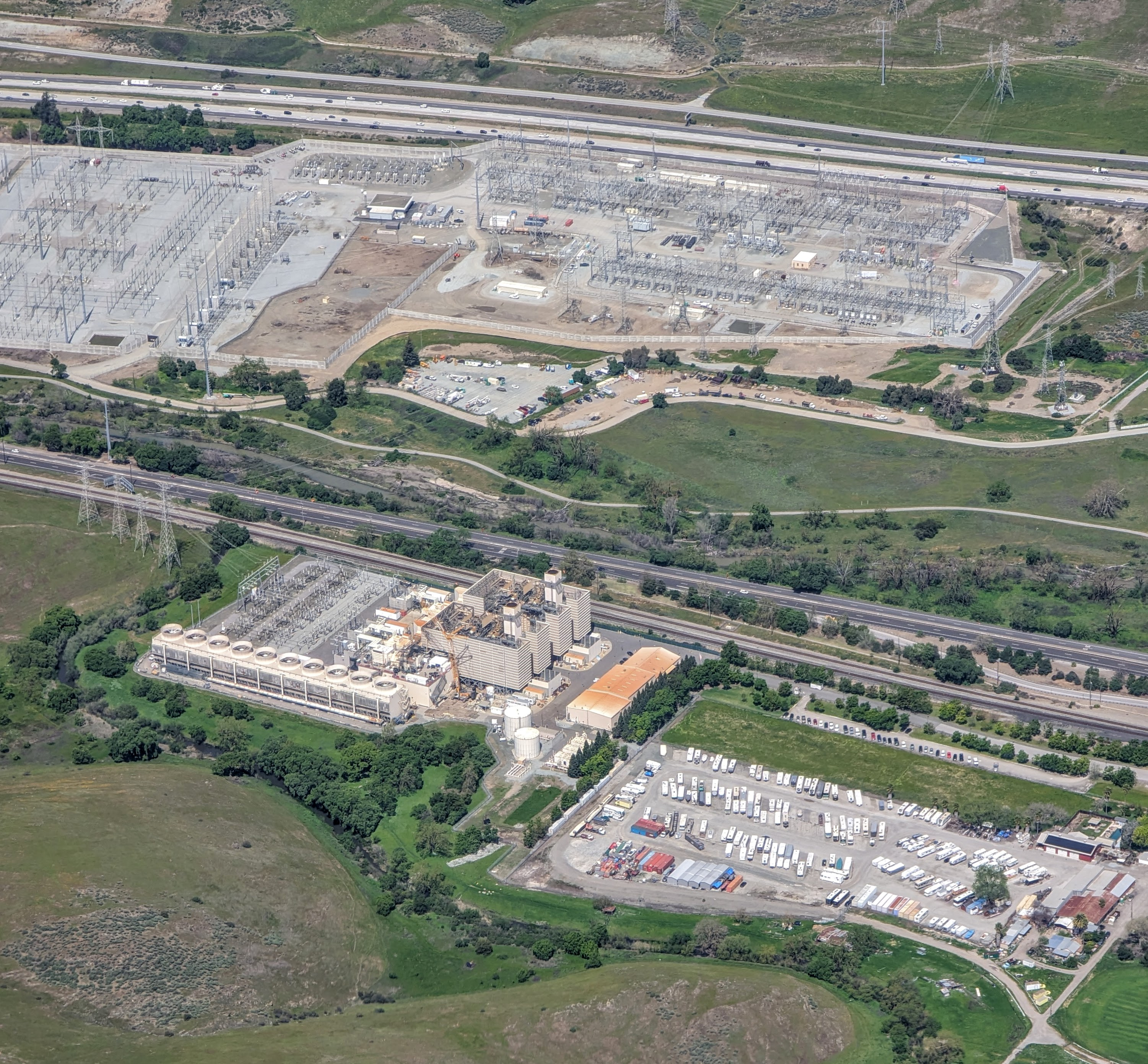
Aerial view of Metcalf Energy Center and Metcalf Substation (and RV storage lot)

The Metcalf Energy Center is a 605 megawatt combined cycle power plant located in Silicon Valley, located in unincorporated Coyote Valley, south of San Jose, California and north of Morgan Hill, California. The power plant is owned by Calpine and powered by natural gas. Some of the power generated by the plant is sent to far away places via Path 15, a major electrical power transmission corridor that is connected to the power plant.

The power plant was the location of a sniper attack in 2013.

== Potential closure ==
In June 2017, Calpine Corporation notified the California Independent System Operator (CAISO) that unless it was granted reliability-must-run (RMR) status, it intended to take the plant offline at the end of 2017. (Reliability-must-run (RMR) status is a designation that a power plant is essential for the reliability of providing needed power at times of peak demand, and/or to maintain a level of redundancy for when other power generation facilities fail.)

Calpine stated that it was no longer economical to continue to run the Metcalf plant at the currently low wholesale electricity prices; the result of an electricity glut in California.

The glut in wholesale prices resulted from policies which guarantee utilities like Pacific Gas and Electric Company (PG&E), (a regulated monopoly), return on investment for building new power plants, even when they are not needed. The Los Angeles Times explains:

"California has a big – and growing – glut of power, an investigation by the Los Angeles Times has found. The state's power plants are on track to be able to produce at least 21% more electricity than it needs by 2020, based on official estimates. And that doesn't even count the soaring production of electricity by rooftop solar panels that has added to the surplus."

"Utilities are typically guaranteed a rate of return of about 10.5% for the cost of each new plant regardless of need. This creates a major incentive to keep construction going: Utilities can make more money building new plants than by buying and reselling readily available electricity from existing plants run by competitors."

"Independents like Calpine don't have a captive audience of residential customers like regulated utilities do. Instead, they sell their electricity under contract or into the electricity market, and make money only if they can find customers for their power."

== See also ==
- Metcalf sniper attack
