= Flat Creek (Little River tributary) =

Stream in North Carolina, USA

Flat Creek Tributary to Little River
- Location of Flat Creek mouth Flat Creek (Little River tributary) (the United States)

Location
- Country: United States
- State: North Carolina
- County: Hoke

Physical characteristics
- Source: Juniper Creek divide
  - location: about 0.25 miles south-southeast of Johnson Mountain
  - coordinates: 35°08′16″N 079°14′26″W
  - elevation: 435 ft (133 m)
- Mouth: Little River
  - location: about 1 mile south of Mt. Pleasant, North Carolina
  - coordinates: 35°11′11″N 079°10′22″W
  - elevation: 187 ft (57 m)
- Length: 6.09 mi (9.80 km)
- Basin size: 7.70 square miles (19.9 km^{2})
- Discharge
  - location: Little River
  - average: 12.92 cu ft/s (0.366 m^{3}/s) at mouth with Little River

Basin features
- Progression: Little River → Cape Fear River → Atlantic Ocean
- River system: Cape Fear River
- Tributaries
  - left: unnamed tributaries
  - right: unnamed tributaries
- Bridges: none

Flat Creek is a 6.09 mi (9.80 km) long 2nd order tributary to the Little River in Hoke County, North Carolina.

== Course ==
Flat Creek rises on the Juniper Creek divide about 0.25 miles south-southeast of Johnson Mountain in Hoke County, North Carolina. Flat Creek then flows northeasterly to meet the Little River about 1 mile south of Mt. Pleasant.

== Watershed ==
Flat Creek drains 7.70 square miles (19.9 km^{2}) of area, receives about 47.8 in/year of precipitation, has a topographic wetness index of 452.17 and is about 50% forested.
