= Joes Fork (Nicks Creek tributary) =

Stream in North Carolina, USA

Joes Fork Tributary to Nicks Creek
- Location of Joes Fork mouth Joes Fork (Nicks Creek tributary) (the United States)

Location
- Country: United States
- State: North Carolina
- County: Moore
- Village: Pinehurst

Physical characteristics
- Source: Deep Creek divide
  - location: about 1.5 miles west of Taylortown, North Carolina
  - coordinates: 35°12′34″N 079°30′54″W
  - elevation: 480 ft (150 m)
- Mouth: Nicks Creek
  - location: about 2 miles north of Pinehurst, North Carolina
  - coordinates: 35°13′56″N 079°27′16″W
  - elevation: 241 ft (73 m)
- Length: 4.07 mi (6.55 km)
- Basin size: 6.07 square miles (15.7 km^{2})
- Discharge
  - location: Nicks Creek
  - average: 7.86 cu ft/s (0.223 m^{3}/s) at mouth with Nicks Creek

Basin features
- Progression: northeast
- River system: Cape Fear River
- Tributaries
  - left: unnamed tributaries
  - right: unnamed tributaries
- Bridges: Glasgow Drive, NC 211, Main Street, Murdocksville Road, Juniper Lake Road

Joes Fork is a 4.07 mi (6.55 km) long 2nd order tributary to Nicks Creek in Moore County, North Carolina.

== Course ==
Joes Fork rises on the Deep Creek divide about 1.5 miles west of Taylortown in Moore County, North Carolina. Joes Fork then flows northeast to meet Nicks Creek about 2 miles north of Pinehurst.

== Watershed ==
Joes Fork drains 6.07 square miles (15.7 km^{2}) of area, receives about 49.7 in/year of precipitation, has a topographic wetness index of 445.60 and is about 28% forested.
