= Foxfire, North Carolina =

- Village
- Foxfire Village
- Location in Moore County and the state of North Carolina
- Coordinates: 35°10′44″N 79°33′50″W
- Country: United States
- State: North Carolina
- County: Moore

Area
  - Total: 7.13 sq mi (18.47 km^{2})
  - Land: 7.07 sq mi (18.31 km^{2})
  - Water: 0.058 sq mi (0.15 km^{2})
- Elevation: 486 ft (148 m)

Population (2020)
  - Total: 1,288
  - Density: 182.2/sq mi (70.34/km^{2})
- Time zone: UTC-5 (Eastern (EST))
  - Summer (DST): UTC-4 (EDT)
- ZIP Codes: 27281 (Foxfire Village); 27376 (West End); 28315 (Aberdeen)
- Area codes: 910, 472
- FIPS code: 37-24570
- GNIS feature ID: 2407459
- Website: www.foxfirenc.com

Foxfire, officially Foxfire Village, is a village in Moore County, North Carolina, United States. The population was 1,288 at the 2020 census, up from 902 in 2010.

== Geography ==
Foxfire is in southwestern Moore County, 6 miles (10 km) west of Pinehurst and 10 miles (16 km) northwest of Aberdeen. The village limits extend west to touch the Moore County line in two places: in the northern extension, bordering Montgomery County, and in the southern one, bordering Richmond County. Foxfire Golf Club is in the center of the village.

According to the U.S. Census Bureau, the village of Foxfire has a total area of 7.1 square miles (18 km^{2}), of which 0.05 square miles (0.13 km^{2}), or 0.67%, are water. The village center sits on high ground which drains west toward Drowning Creek (the upstream portion of the Lumber River) and east toward its tributary, Deep Creek.

Foxfire is one of the few incorporated areas of North Carolina that does not host any primary numbered state highways (0–999).

== Demographics ==
Historical population
Census	Pop.	Note	%±
1980	153		—
1990	334		118.3%
2000	474		41.9%
2010	902		90.3%
2020	1,288		42.8%
U.S. Decennial Census

=== 2020 census ===
Foxfire racial composition
Race	Number	Percentage
White (non-Hispanic)	1,076	83.54%
Black or African American (non-Hispanic)	54	4.19%
Native American	13	1.01%
Asian	18	1.4%
Pacific Islander	1	0.08%
Other/Mixed	70	5.43%
Hispanic or Latino	56	4.35%

As of the 2020 United States census, there were 1,288 people, 646 households, and 402 families residing in the village.

=== 2000 census ===
As of the census of 2000, there were 474 people, 222 households, and 172 families residing in the village. The population density was 165.4 inhabitants per square mile (63.9/km^{2}). There were 324 housing units at an average density of 113.1 per square mile (43.7/km^{2}). The racial makeup of the village was 98.31% White, 1.27% African American and 0.42% Asian. Hispanic or Latino of any race were 1.05% of the population.

There were 222 households, out of which 12.2% had children under the age of 18 living with them, 73.9% were married couples living together, 2.3% had a female householder with no husband present, and 22.1% were non-families. 19.8% of all households were made up of individuals, and 11.7% had someone living alone who was 65 years of age or older. The average household size was 2.14 and the average family size was 2.40.

In the village, the population was spread out, with 11.0% under the age of 18, 3.0% from 18 to 24, 15.4% from 25 to 44, 22.8% from 45 to 64, and 47.9% who were 65 years of age or older. The median age was 64 years. For every 100 females, there were 100.0 males. For every 100 females age 18 and over, there were 98.1 males.

The median income for a household in the village was $54,750, and the median income for a family was $60,625. Males had a median income of $51,042 versus $24,643 for females. The per capita income for the village was $29,030. About 1.7% of families and 1.6% of the population were below the poverty line, including none of those under the age of eighteen or sixty-five or over.
