= Joseph R. Fisher (USMC) =

United States Marine Corps officer (1921–1981

- Nicknames: "Old Indestructible" "Bull"
- Born: March 14, 1921; Allston, Massachusetts, US
- Died: January 19, 1981 (aged 59) Whispering Pines, North Carolina, US
- Allegiance: United States
- Branch: United States Marine Corps
- Service years: 1942–1968
- Rank: Colonel
- Commands: Company I, 3rd Battalion, 1st Marines, 1st Marine Division; 2nd Battalion, 4th Marines, 3rd Marine Division
- Conflicts: World War II; Battle of Iwo Jima; Korean War; Battle of Inchon; Second Battle of Seoul; Battle of Chosin Reservoir; Vietnam War; Operation Starlite
- Awards: Navy Cross; Silver Star (2); Purple Heart

Joseph R. Fisher (March 14, 1921 – January 19, 1981) was a highly decorated United States Marine Corps colonel. He was awarded the Navy Cross and two Silver Stars during his career which spanned from World War II to the Vietnam War.

== Early life and World War II ==
Joseph R. Fisher was born on March 14, 1921, in Allston, Massachusetts. He was raised in Westwood and graduated from Dedham High School. Fisher enlisted in the Marine Corps in 1942 and quickly rose to the rank of platoon sergeant.

By February 1945, Platoon Sergeant Fisher was assigned to Company C, 1st Battalion, 26th Marines, 5th Marine Division. On the afternoon of February 19, Fisher's battalion made an amphibious landing at Red Beach 1 on Iwo Jima. On the morning of February 21, while his battalion assaulted Airfield No. 1 Fisher's company became pinned down by a Japanese machine gun bunker.

Fisher began crawling toward the machine gun with several hand grenades when he was shot through his shoulder and then his chest in quick succession. Despite his wounds, Fisher crawled the rest of the way to the bunker and silenced the position with his grenades. He then refused to be evacuated and continued leading his platoon before he lost consciousness.

Fisher was awarded his first Silver Star for his actions. He spent several months in a hospital and returned to duty in July 1945. Fisher was then commissioned as a second lieutenant and took part in the occupation of Japan.

== Korean War ==
When the Korean War broke out, First Lieutenant Fisher was given command of Company I, 3rd Battalion, 1st Marines, 1st Marine Division. Fisher was personally appointed as a company commander by his regiment commander, Colonel Chesty Puller, who remarked that Fisher was "one of the best damned company commanders who ever lived."

Fisher led his company during the amphibious assault at Inchon and the subsequent recapture of Seoul in September 1950. Outside the city of Seoul, his company defended Hill 105S from a North Korean attack and captured 10 prisoners. During the entire Inchon-Seoul campaign, Fisher lost only one Marine killed and two wounded.

At the conclusion of the Inchon-Seoul campaign, the entire 1st Marine Division embarked on Navy ships, which sailed around South Korea and landed at Wonsan in October. The division then marched 70 miles north to the Chosin Reservoir area. As the Marines arrived at Chosin Reservoir, the Chinese Communist military encircled the entire division and the coldest winter in 50 years descended on Korea. Temperatures fell as low as −35 °F as a blizzard swept the area.

On November 25, First Lieutenant Fisher positioned his company on "East Hill" which strategically overlooked the village of Hagaru-ri. At 10:30 p.m. on November 28, Company I was attacked by a Chinese regiment. Fisher repeatedly exposed himself to the heavy fire to direct mortar fire, direct the fire of his Marines and increase morale. At one point during the night, the Chinese penetrated the perimeter of 3rd Platoon and Fisher led a counterattack and engaged in hand-to-hand combat. The battle lasted for eight hours, concluding on the morning of the 29th. The Chinese withdrew after three failed attempts to take the hill, leaving approximately 700 of their dead, killed during the battle. When Colonel Puller asked Fisher how many of the enemy he had killed, Fisher replied, "A whole piss pot full, sir." For his actions during the battle of Chosin Reservoir, Fisher was awarded the Navy Cross; Puller was awarded his 5th Navy Cross.

=== Navy Cross citation ===
Citation:

The President of the United States of America takes pleasure in presenting the Navy Cross to First Lieutenant Joseph R. Fisher (MCSN: 0-45857), United States Marine Corps, for extraordinary heroism in connection with military operations against an armed enemy of the United Nations while serving as Commanding Officer of Company I, Third Battalion, First Marines, FIRST Marine Division (Reinforced), in action against enemy aggressor forces at Hagaru-ri, Korea, on 28 - 29 November 1950. With his company position under heavy attack by a numerically superior and fanatical enemy force estimated at more than regimental strength, First Lieutenant Fisher repeatedly exposed himself to a terrific hail of shattering hostile machine-gun, grenade, mortar, artillery and small-arms fire in order to move along the full length of his lines and re-deploy his men. Throughout the fierce eight-hour onslaught carried out at near-zero temperatures by wave upon wave of enemy troops operating under cover of darkness and a heavy snowfall, he continued to direct his troops in repulsing assault after assault, lending them words of encouragement and personally spotting accurate mortar fire upon hostile positions. By his superb leadership and cool courage in the face of overwhelming odds, First Lieutenant Fisher served to inspire his gallant men to heroic efforts in repulsing several vicious onslaughts by a resolute enemy, thus insuring the defense of a large segment of a perimeter vital to the welfare of the entire corps at that time. His valiant fighting spirit and selfless devotion to duty throughout were in keeping with the highest traditions of the United States Naval Service.

== Post-Korean War ==
After one year of service in Korea, Captain Fisher returned to the United States and attended the amphibious warfare course at Marine Corps Base Quantico, Virginia. He was then assigned to Naval Weapons Station Seal Beach, California, before transferring to the 9th Marine Regiment, 3rd Marine Division in Japan.

In 1957, Major Fisher returned to Quantico where he instructed new officers at The Basic School. In 1962, he attended the Armed Forces Staff College in Norfolk, Virginia. Upon graduating the course, Fisher was promoted to lieutenant colonel and stationed at Camp H. M. Smith in Hawaii.

Lieutenant Colonel Fisher was then given command of 2nd Battalion, 4th Marines, 1st Marine Expeditionary Brigade on June 4, 1964. At the change of command ceremony at Kāneʻohe Bay, Fisher called his new battalion his "Magnificent Bastards," a nickname which has stuck to 2/4.

== Vietnam War ==
In May 1965, 2/4 was reassigned to the 3rd Marine Division and deployed to Vietnam, arriving at Chu Lai. On August 18, 1965, Lieutenant Colonel Fisher led his battalion in a helicopter assault near Van Tuong, commencing Operation Starlite. Fisher led his Marines during four days of continuous combat with very little sleep.

By August 24, Lieutenant Colonel Fisher’s battalion had killed more than 300 of the enemy. For his actions during Operation Starlite, Fisher was awarded his second Silver Star.

== Later life ==
In 1968, Colonel Fisher retired from the Marines in North Carolina. Joseph R. Fisher died of a heart attack while playing golf on January 19, 1981, in Whispering Pines, North Carolina.

== See also ==
- List of Navy Cross recipients for the Korean War
