= Deep Creek (Little River tributary) =

Stream in North Carolina, USA

Deep Creek Tributary to Little River
- Location of Deep Creek mouth Deep Creek (Little River tributary) (the United States)

Location
- Country: United States
- State: North Carolina
- County: Hoke

Physical characteristics
- Source: Nicholson Creek divide
  - location: about 0.25 miles north of Gaddys Mountain
  - coordinates: 35°07′17″N 079°11′06″W
  - elevation: 420 ft (130 m)
- Mouth: Little River
  - location: about 3 miles southeast of Mt. Pleasant, North Carolina
  - coordinates: 35°10′21″N 079°08′51″W
  - elevation: 174 ft (53 m)
- Length: 4.65 mi (7.48 km)
- Basin size: 7.78 square miles (20.2 km^{2})
- Discharge
  - location: Little River
  - average: 8.75 cu ft/s (0.248 m^{3}/s) at mouth with Little River

Basin features
- Progression: Little River → Cape Fear River → Atlantic Ocean
- River system: Cape Fear River
- Tributaries
  - left: Mill Creek
  - right: unnamed tributaries
- Bridges: none

Deep Creek is a 4.65 mi (7.48 km) long 2nd order tributary to the Little River in Hoke County, North Carolina.

== Course ==
Deep Creek rises on the Nicholson Creek divide about 0.25 miles north of Gaddys Mountain in Hoke County, North Carolina. Deep Creek then flows northeasterly to meet the Little River about 3 miles southeast of Mt. Pleasant.

== Watershed ==
Deep Creek drains 7.78 square miles (20.2 km^{2}) of area, receives about 47.7 in/year of precipitation, has a topographic wetness index of 447.26 and is about 48% forested.
