= Little River (Cape Fear River tributary) =

Stream in North Carolina, USA

Little River Tributary to Cape Fear River
- Location of Little River mouth Little River (Cape Fear River tributary) (the United States)

Location
- Country: United States
- State: North Carolina
- County: Moore; Hoke; Cumberland; Harnett

Physical characteristics
- Source: Jackson Creek divide
  - location: pond about 0.25 miles north of West End, North Carolina
  - coordinates: 35°14′40″N 079°33′53″W
  - elevation: 535 ft (163 m)
- Mouth: Cape Fear River
  - location: about 2 miles east of Linden, North Carolina
  - coordinates: 35°15′25″N 078°42′12″W
  - elevation: 56 ft (17 m)
- Length: 71.14 mi (114.49 km)
- Basin size: 4,248.05 square miles (11,002.4 km^{2})
- Discharge
  - location: Cape Fear River
  - average: 475.13 cu ft/s (13.454 m^{3}/s) at mouth with Cape Fear River

Basin features
- Progression: Cape Fear River → Atlantic Ocean
- River system: Cape Fear River
- Tributaries
  - left: Wads Creek; Crane Creek; Buffalo Creek; Turkey Creek; Hector Creek; Jumping Run Creek; Anderson Creek; Stewarts Creek
  - right: Nicks Creek; Mill Creek; James Creek; Horse Creek; Flat Creek; Deep Creek; Little Creek; Cypress Creek; McPherson Creek; Tank Creek; Gibsons Creek
- Waterbodies: Thagards Lake
- Bridges: Carthage Road, McKenzies Mill Road, Beulah Hill Church Road, Murdocksville Road, US 15-501, NC 22, McCaskill Road, Rays Bridge Road, Country Club Blvd., Niagara-Carthage Road, Holly Street, US 1, Long Point Road, Lakebay Road, Morrison Bridge Road, NC 24, E Manchester Road, NC 210, McCormick Bridge Road, W Reeves Bridge Road, US 401, NC 217

Little River is a 71.14 mi (114.49 km) long 5th order tributary to the Cape Fear River in North Carolina. This stream delineates the county boundaries of Moore-Hoke Counties and Harnett-Cumberland Counties for some of its distance.

== Variant names ==
According to the Geographic Names Information System, it has also been known historically as:

- Lower Little River

== Course ==
Little River rises in a pond on the Jackson Creek divide about 0.25 miles north of West End in Moore County, North Carolina. Little River then flows easterly to meet the Cape Fear River about 2 miles east of Linden in Cumberland and Harnett Counties.

== Watershed ==
Little River drains 4,248.05 square miles (11,002.4 km^{2}) of area, receives about 47.1 in/year of precipitation, has a topographic wetness index of 431.94 and is about 47% forested.

== See also ==
- List of rivers of North Carolina
