= Aberdeen Creek (Drowning Creek tributary) =

Stream in North Carolina, USA

Aberdeen Creek Tributary to Drowning Creek
- Location of Aberdeen Creek mouth Aberdeen Creek (Drowning Creek tributary) (the United States)

Location
- Country: United States
- State: North Carolina
- County: Moore
- Town: Aberdeen
- Village: Pinehurst

Physical characteristics
- Source: Mill Creek divide
  - location: about 1 mile east of Pinehurst, North Carolina
  - coordinates: 35°12′16″N 079°26′02″W
  - elevation: 472 ft (144 m)
- Mouth: Drowning Creek
  - location: about 2 miles southwest of Addor, North Carolina
  - coordinates: 35°03′08″N 079°28′27″W
  - elevation: 266 ft (81 m)
- Length: 12.45 mi (20.04 km)
- Basin size: 32.63 square miles (84.5 km^{2})
- Discharge
  - location: Drowning Creek
  - average: 43.79 cu ft/s (1.240 m^{3}/s) at mouth with Drowning Creek

Basin features
- Progression: Drowning Creek (Lumber River) → Little Pee Dee River → Pee Dee River → Winyah Bay → Atlantic Ocean
- River system: Lumber River
- Tributaries
  - left: unnamed tributaries
  - right: unnamed tributaries
- Waterbodies: Watson Lake; Pages Lake
- Bridges: US 15-501, Irvernay Road, W Morganton Road, Lake Dornoch Drive (x2), Keith Street, Pinebluff Lake Road, Addor Road

Aberdeen Creek is a 12.45 mi (20.04 km) long 3rd order tributary to Drowning Creek (Lumber River), in Moore County, North Carolina, United States.

== History ==
Most of the area around Aberdeen Creek was settled by Scots-Irish Immigrants in the 1700s. Historically the major industry was naval stores from the surrounding pine forests, but this has changed to include thriving retirement communities. The creek was named Devil Gut Creek until 1887, when it was changed to Aberdeen Creek.

== Variant names ==
According to the Geographic Names Information System, it has also been known historically as:

- Devil Creek
- Devils Gut Creek

== Course ==
Aberdeen Creek rises on the Mill Creek divide about 1 mi (1.6 km) east of Pinehurst in Moore County, North Carolina. Aberdeen Creek then takes a southerly course through numerous swamps to meet Drowning Creek about 2 mi (3.2 km) southwest of Addor.

== Watershed ==
Aberdeen Creek drains 32.65 square miles (84.6 km^{2}) of area, receives about 49.3 in (1,250 mm)/year of precipitation, has a topographic wetness index of 473.33 and is about 29% forested.

== See also ==
- List of North Carolina Rivers

== Maps ==
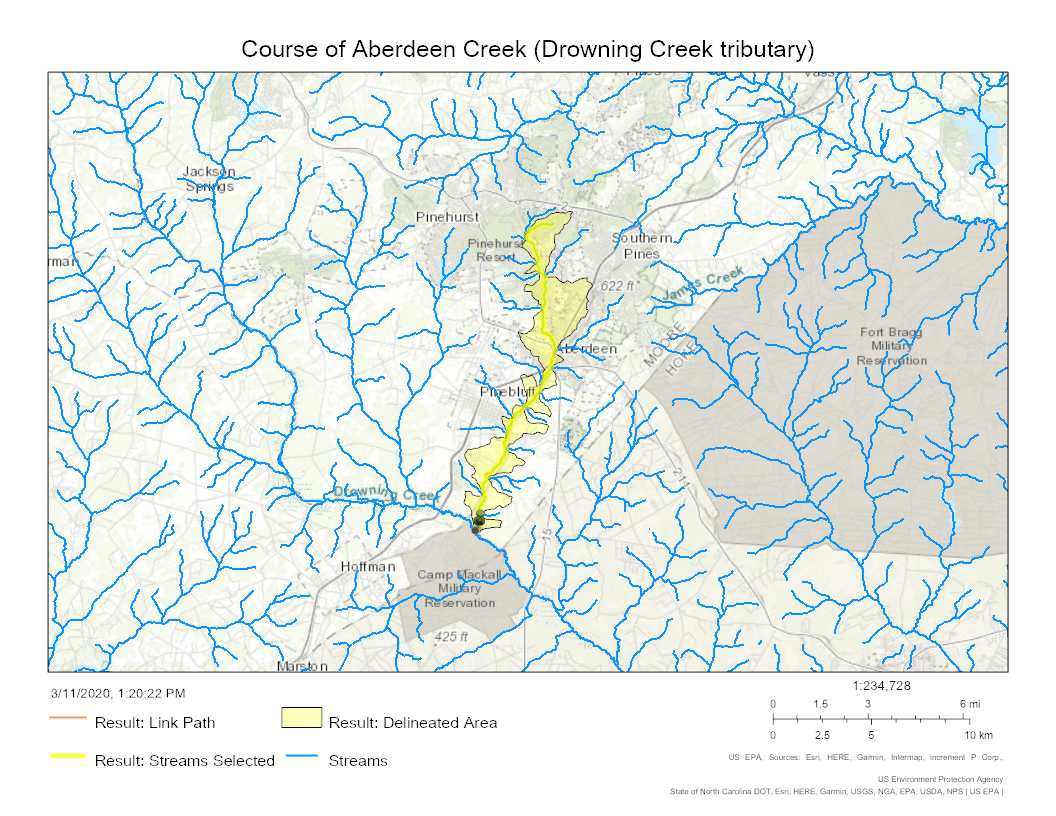
Course of Aberdeen Creek (Drowning Creek tributary)

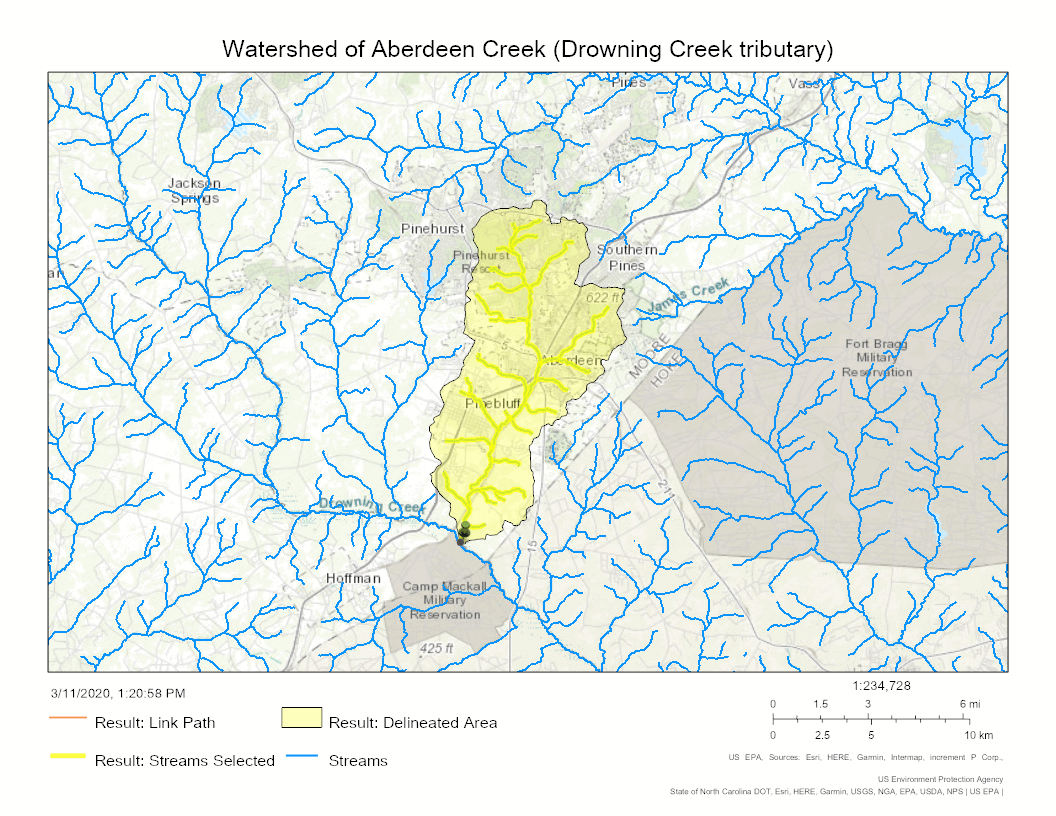
Watershed of Aberdeen Creek (Drowning Creek tributary)
