= Whispering Pines, North Carolina =

- Village
- Location in Moore County and the state of North Carolina
- Coordinates: 35°15′12″N 79°22′31″W
- Country: United States
- State: North Carolina
- County: Moore
- Established: 1959
- Incorporated: 1969

Government
  - Mayor: Linda Vandercook
  - Manager: Rich Lambdin

Area
  - Total: 4.42 sq mi (11.44 km^{2})
  - Land: 3.79 sq mi (9.82 km^{2})
  - Water: 0.63 sq mi (1.62 km^{2})
- Elevation: 371 ft (113 m)

Population (2020)
  - Total: 4,987
  - Density: 1,315.0/sq mi (507.71/km^{2})
- Time zone: UTC-5 (Eastern (EST))
  - Summer (DST): UTC-4 (EDT)
- ZIP Code: 28327
- Area codes: 910, 472
- FIPS code: 37-73140
- GNIS feature ID: 2407570
- Website: vwpnc.org

Whispering Pines is a village in Moore County, North Carolina, United States. The population was 4,987 at the 2020 census, up from 2,928 in 2010.

== Geography ==
The village is in east-central Moore County, bordered to the southwest by the town of Southern Pines. The center of Southern Pines is 7 miles (11 km) by road to the south, while Carthage, the Moore county seat, is 8 miles (13 km) to the north and Vass is 7 miles (11 km) to the east.

According to the U.S. Census Bureau, the village of Whispering Pines has a total area of 4.42 square miles (11.45 km^{2}), of which 3.79 square miles (9.82 km^{2}) are land and 0.63 square miles (1.6 km^{2}), or 14.2%, are water. Several lakes have been built within the village, including Thagards Lake, Spring Valley Lake, Pine Lake, and Shadow Lake. Thagards Lake is an impoundment on the Little River, an east-flowing tributary of the Cape Fear River.

== Demographics ==
Historical population
Census	Pop.	Note	%±
1970	362		—
1980	1,160		220.4%
1990	1,243		7.2%
2000	2,090		68.1%
2010	2,928		40.1%
2020	4,987		70.3%
U.S. Decennial Census

=== 2020 census ===
Whispering Pines racial composition
Race	Number	Percentage
White (non-Hispanic)	4,272	85.66%
Black or African American (non-Hispanic)	71	1.42%
Native American	20	0.4%
Asian	63	1.26%
Pacific Islander	4	0.08%
Other/Mixed	283	5.67%
Hispanic or Latino	274	5.49%

As of the 2020 census, Whispering Pines had a population of 4,987. The median age was 38.5 years. 30.6% of residents were under the age of 18 and 19.1% of residents were 65 years of age or older. For every 100 females there were 93.4 males, and for every 100 females age 18 and over there were 89.6 males age 18 and over.

99.9% of residents lived in urban areas, while 0.1% lived in rural areas.

There were 1,765 households in Whispering Pines, of which 42.4% had children under the age of 18 living in them. Of all households, 73.0% were married-couple households, 8.6% were households with a male householder and no spouse or partner present, and 16.8% were households with a female householder and no spouse or partner present. About 17.2% of all households were made up of individuals and 10.9% had someone living alone who was 65 years of age or older.

There were 1,858 housing units, of which 5.0% were vacant. The homeowner vacancy rate was 1.5% and the rental vacancy rate was 8.8%.

=== 2000 census ===
As of the census of 2000, there were 2,090 people, 970 households, and 770 families residing in the village. The population density was 689.9 inhabitants per square mile (266.4/km^{2}). There were 1,054 housing units at an average density of 347.9 per square mile (134.3/km^{2}). The racial makeup of the village was 97.89% White, 1.15% African American, 0.24% Native American, 0.33% Asian, 0.10% Pacific Islander, 0.05% from other races, and 0.24% from two or more races. Hispanic or Latino of any race were 1.15% of the population.

There were 970 households, out of which 14.6% had children under the age of 18 living with them, 76.7% were married couples living together, 2.4% had a female householder with no husband present, and 20.6% were non-families. 19.3% of all households were made up of individuals, and 13.3% had someone living alone who was 65 years of age or older. The average household size was 2.15 and the average family size was 2.43.

In the village, the population was spread out, with 13.0% under the age of 18, 1.5% from 18 to 24, 13.9% from 25 to 44, 25.4% from 45 to 64, and 46.2% who were 65 years of age or older. The median age was 63 years. For every 100 females, there were 89.5 males. For every 100 females age 18 and over, there were 91.4 males.

The median income for a household in the village was $60,035, and the median income for a family was $66,587. Males had a median income of $48,906 versus $33,750 for females. The per capita income for the village was $33,086. About 0.5% of families and 1.2% of the population were below the poverty line, including 2.0% of those under age 18 and 1.0% of those age 65 or over.

== Notable people ==
- Joseph "Bull" Fisher, colonel in the U.S. Marine Corps, awarded the Navy Cross Medal, two Silver Star Medals, and the Purple Heart; died in Whispering Pines
- Shannon Moore, TNA wrestler
