= West End, North Carolina =

- Unincorporated community
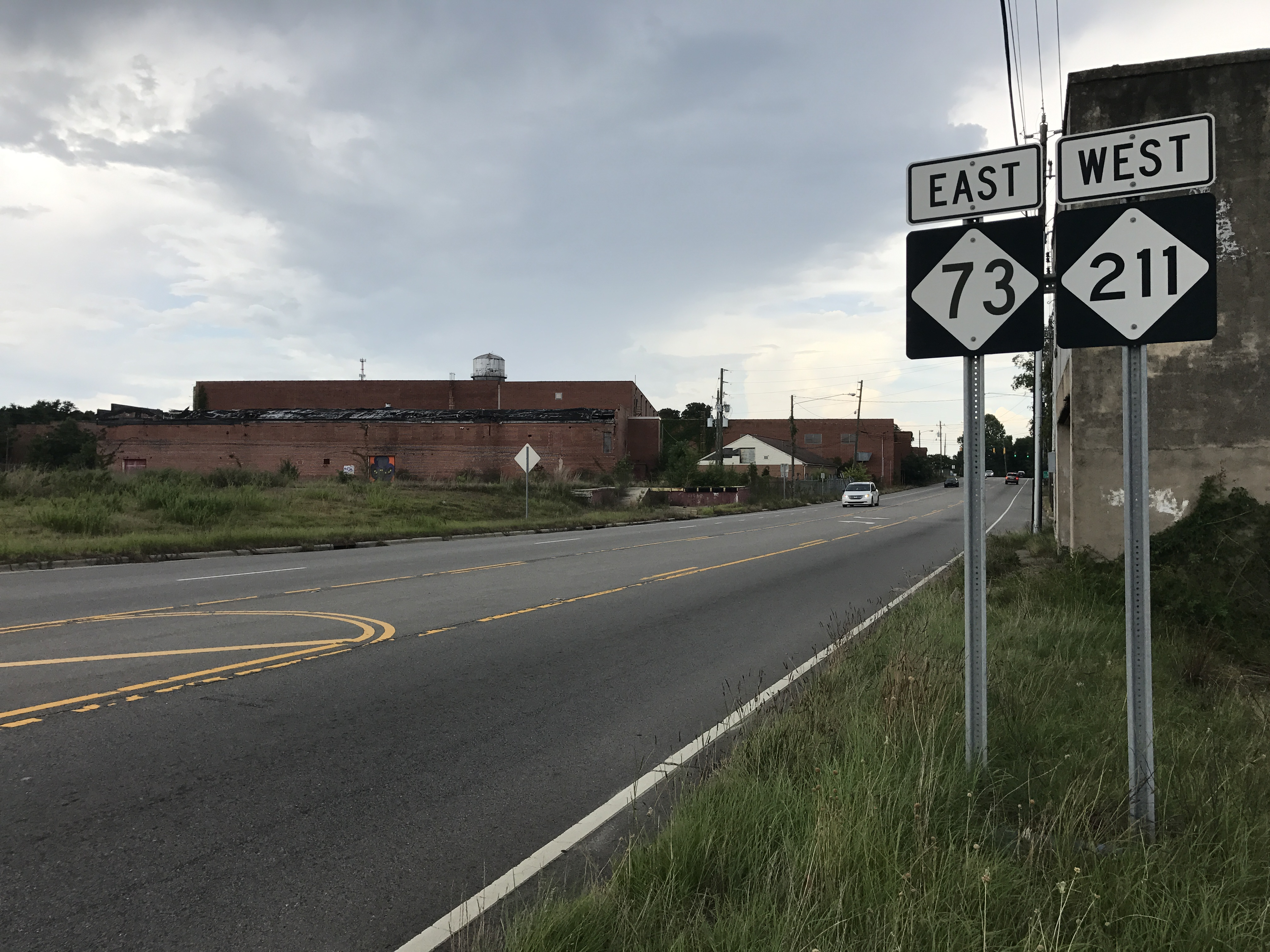
- Former Stanley furniture plant before being razed

- Location within North Carolina Location within the United States
- Coordinates: 35°14′23″N 79°34′03″W
- Country: United States
- State: North Carolina
- County: Moore
- Founded: 1890
- Named after: Western terminus of a railroad
- Elevation: 607 ft (185 m)
- Time zone: UTC-5 (Eastern (EST))
  - Summer (DST): UTC-4 (EDT)
- ZIP code: 27376
- Area codes: 910, 472
- GNIS feature ID: 997007

West End is an unincorporated community in Moore County, North Carolina, United States. The community is located at the multiplex of two primary state highways, North Carolina Highway 211 (NC 211) and North Carolina Highway 73 (NC 73). It is named for when it was the western terminus of a railroad from Aberdeen, from about 1890–1898.

== History ==
In the late 1880s, turpentine distillery operator Daniel McDonald of Moore County petitioned local railroad owner Allison Page to extend rail lines to his property to allow him to ship his products. Page agreed and extended the Aberdeen & Star Railroad 13 miles (21 km) northwest from Aberdeen to McDonald's land. The western terminal of this line was dubbed West End, and a community arose around it with the same name. All buildings in the community but the train station and a drug store were destroyed by fire in 1898.

In the aftermath of the fire, the community was rebuilt on an agricultural economy, with particular emphasis on the cultivation of peaches. In 1927, peach grower J.B. Von Cannon established a factory which eventually became the Sandhills Furniture Corporation. The facility was purchased by Stanley Furniture in 1965. In early 2002, Stanley Furniture closed its West End plant, eliminating a work force of 400 jobs. In 2019, the facility was razed to make way for the widening of NC 211 into a four-lane divided boulevard.

== See also ==
- Moore County substation attack
