= Moore County, North Carolina =

County in North Carolina, United States

- County
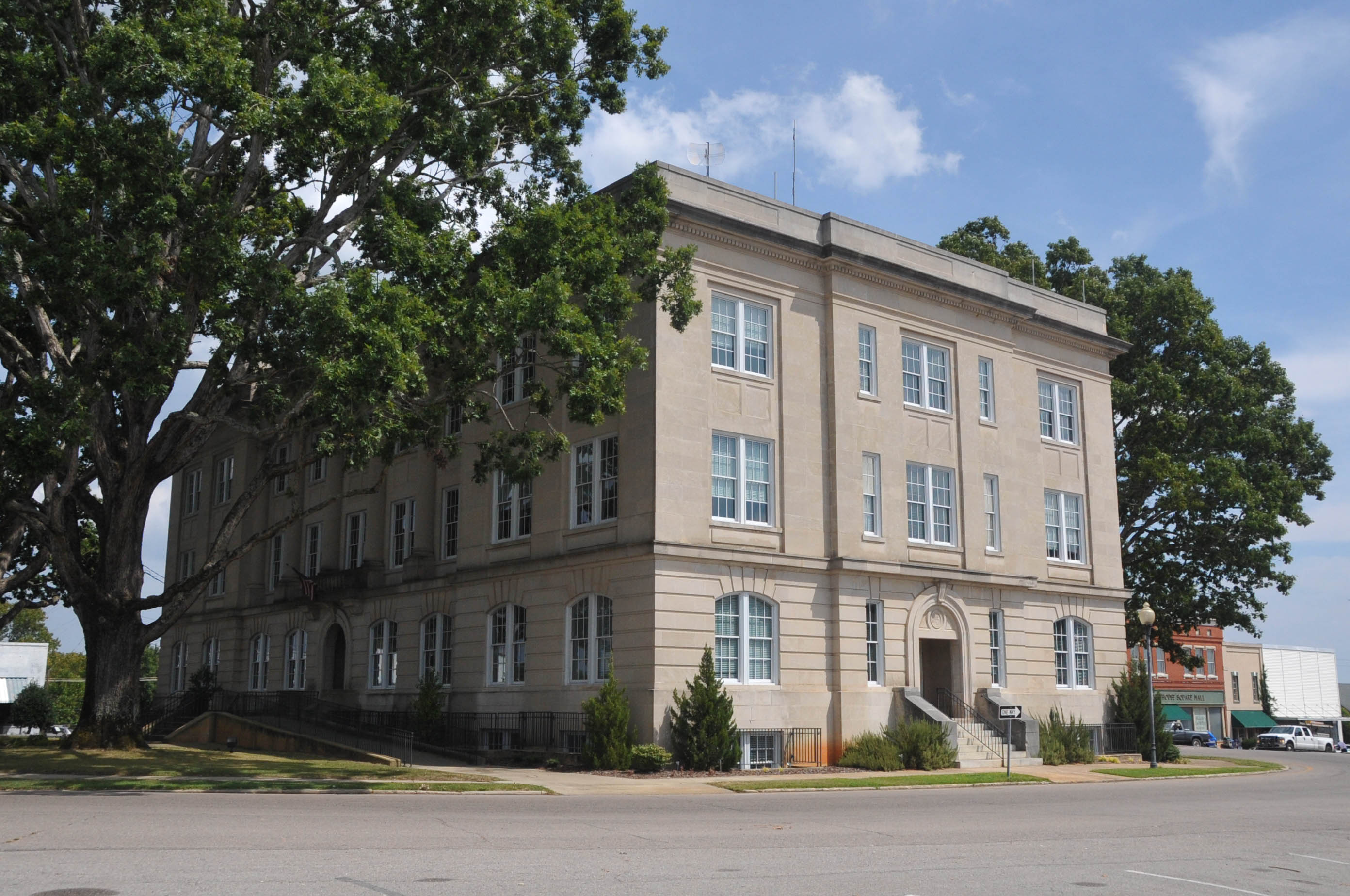
- Moore County Courthouse in Carthage

- Flag Seal

- Location within the U.S. state of North Carolina
- Coordinates: 35.31°N 79.49°W
- Country: United States
- State: North Carolina
- Founded: 1784
- Named for: Alfred Moore
- Seat: Carthage
- Largest community: Pinehurst

Area
  - Total: 705.69 sq mi (1,827.7 km^{2})
  - Land: 697.68 sq mi (1,807.0 km^{2})
  - Water: 8.00 sq mi (20.7 km^{2}) 1.13%

Population (2020)
  - Total: 99,727
  - Estimate (2025): 110,619▲
  - Density: 142.94/sq mi (55.19/km^{2})
- Time zone: UTC−5 (Eastern)
  - Summer (DST): UTC−4 (EDT)
- Congressional district: 9th
- Website: www.moorecountync.gov

Moore County is a county located in the U.S. state of North Carolina. As of the 2020 census, its population was 99,727. Its county seat is Carthage and its largest community Pinehurst. It is a border county between the Piedmont and the Atlantic Coastal Plain.

In the early years, the economy was dependent on agriculture and lumber. The lumber business expanded after railroads reached the area, improving access to markets. It lies at the northern edge of the area known as the Sandhills region, and developed resorts in the late 19th century, aided by railroads.

Since the early 21st century, Moore County comprises the Pinehurst-Southern Pines, NC Metropolitan Statistical Area. Moore County is a part of the Fayetteville-Lumberton-Pinehurst, NC Combined Statistical Area, which had an estimated population of 693,299 in 2023, making it the 75th-largest CSA in the United States.

== History ==
Archeological evidence indicates Siouan Native Americans inhabited the area eventually comprising Moore County from the early 500s until the 1600s. European settlers arrived in about 1739. In subsequent years, settlers of English, Ulster Scots, and German origin arrived by way of the Great Wagon Road and from the Cape Fear River valley, with most choosing to reside in the northern section of the eventual county. From the 1750s to the 1770s, the area received an influx of settlers from the Scottish Highlands, who mostly occupied the southeastern portions of the county and developed a naval stores industry with the area's longleaf pines. The Scots also brought African slaves to the area.

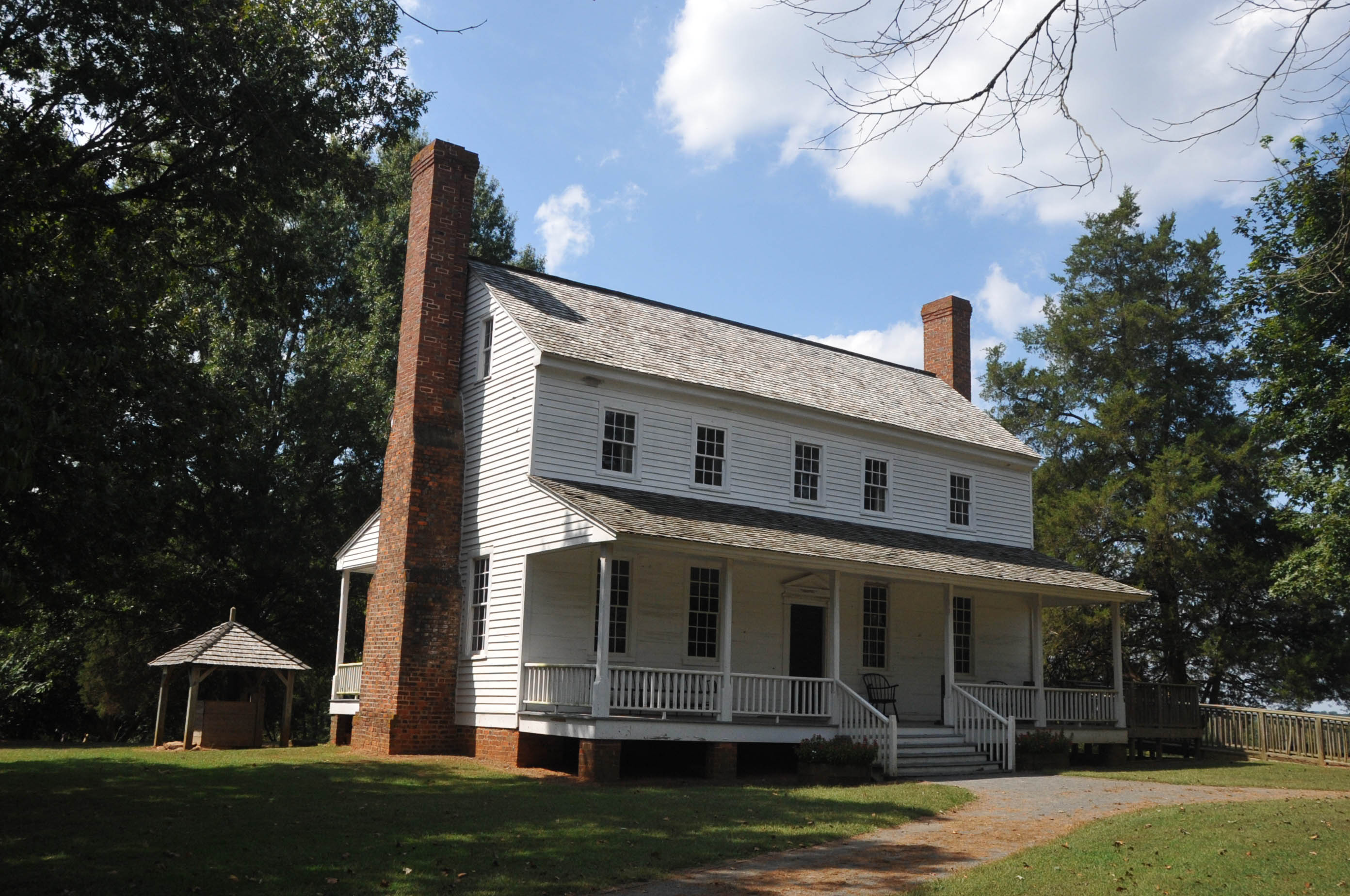
A Revolutionary War skirmish occurred at the House in the Horseshoe (pictured) in 1781.

Settlement decreased during the American Revolutionary War. Settlers in the northern portion of the eventual county generally supported the Patriots, while the Highlands Scots in the southeastern area were mostly Loyalists. In July 1781 a Patriot–Loyalist skirmish took place at the House in the Horseshoe. Many Loyalists were socially ostracized after the end of the war. Moore County was formed in 1784, from part of Cumberland County. It was named after Alfred Moore, an officer in the Revolutionary War and a later associate justice of the Supreme Court of the United States. A courthouse was erected the following year. The county's boundaries were redrawn several times between 1784 and 1829. The county's northern section benefited from economic development in the years after its creation. In 1796, a law was passed designating the county seat at a new community to be known as Carthage, where the courthouse was eventually moved in 1814. A new one was built six years later. Another one was built in 1840.

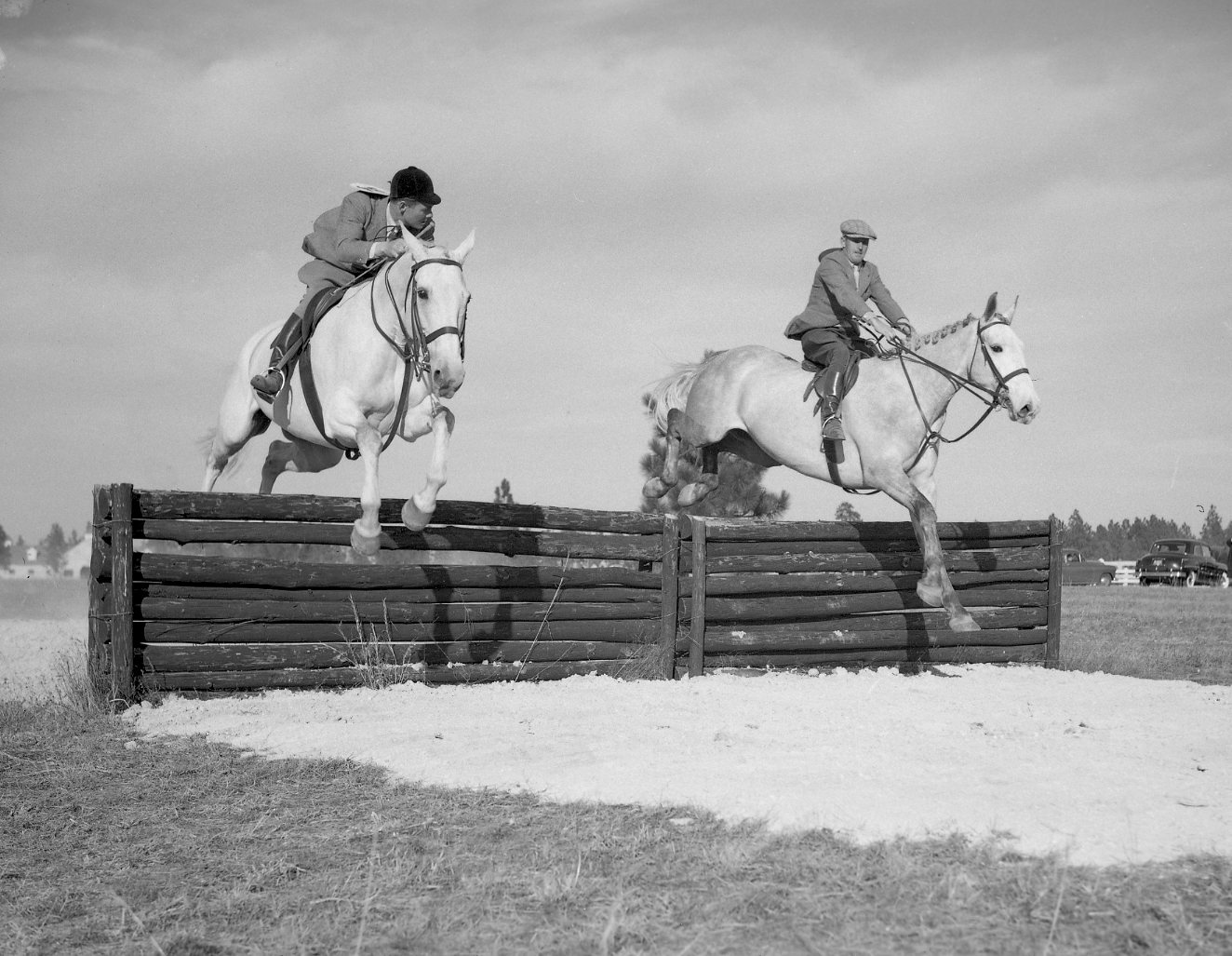
Equestrian games in Pinehurst, c. 1930s

Many men from the county served in the American Civil War. In 1877, the Raleigh and Augusta Air Line Railroad was established and laid through Moore, leading to the creation of new communities. Logging of the local pines increased and the rail towns of Cameron, Manly, Keyser, and Aberdeen were built to ship the lumber. Most of the county's old-growth pine forests were depleted by 1900. With large swathes of lands cleared and transportation links well-established, new health resort towns and mineral spas were created, such as Southern Pines, Pinehurst, Pinebluff, and Jackson Springs.

In 1897, the first golf courses were established in the county. The number of courses expanded over the years and drew in wealthy vacationers from New England and the Mid-Atlantic, who built seasonal homes in Pinehurst and Southern Pines. Fox hunting and polo and equestrian activities also grew in popularity. In 1907, parts of Moore and Chatham counties were combined to form Lee County. In 1922, the present Moore County Courthouse was built. In 1958, the Little River Township of Hoke County was annexed to Moore.

Moore County has many golf resorts in the Southern Pines/Pinehurst area, and hosted the 1996 and 2001 Women's U.S. Opens, as well as the 1999, 2005, and 2024 Men's U.S. Opens. The Women's Open returned to Southern Pines in 2007. In 2014, they consecutively hosted both the Women's and Men's Opens in the same year, a first in U.S. Open history.

== Geography ==
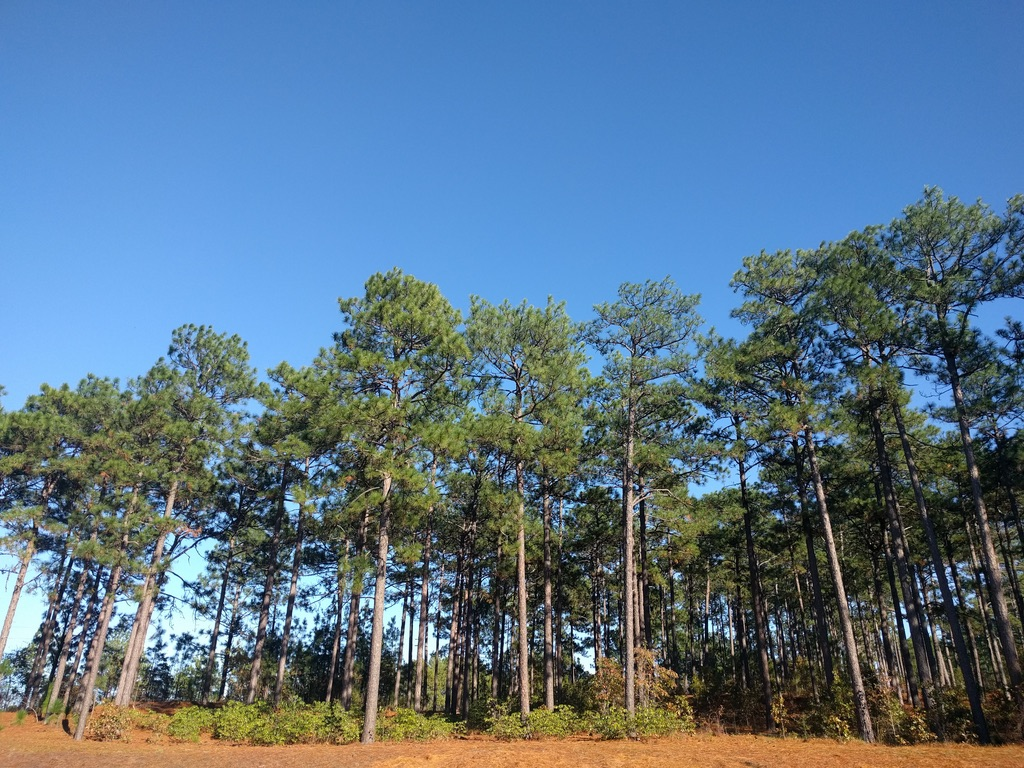
Pine trees in Moore County

According to the U.S. Census Bureau, the county has a total area of 705.69 square miles (1,827.7 km^{2}), of which 697.68 square miles (1,807.0 km^{2}) is land and 8.00 square miles (20.7 km^{2}) (1.13%) is water. Moore County is bordered by Chatham, Lee, Harnett, Cumberland, Hoke, Scotland, Richmond, Montgomery, and Randolph counties. It lies mostly within the Piedmont region, though some of the county extends into the state's Coastal Plain. Additionally, the county lies within the Sandhills region, and about two-thirds of its land are host to sandy soils. The county drains into the Cape Fear River Basin and Lumber River Basin. Local waterways include Pine Lake, Deep and Little Rivers and Aberdeen, Big Governors, Big Juniper, Drowning, Herds, McLendons, Sugar, and Little Crane Creeks.

Longleaf pine is native to the region. It grows in the Sandhills Game Land, a state nature preserve which covers part of Moore County, and the Weymouth Woods-Sandhills Nature Preserve, which resides wholly in the county. Fish present in the county include bass, sunfish, and Cape Fear shiner. The endangered red-cockaded woodpecker resides in the area.

== Demographics ==
Historical population
Census	Pop.	Note	%±
1790	3,870		—
1800	4,767		23.2%
1810	6,367		33.6%
1820	7,128		12.0%
1830	7,745		8.7%
1840	7,988		3.1%
1850	9,342		17.0%
1860	11,427		22.3%
1870	12,040		5.4%
1880	16,821		39.7%
1890	20,479		21.7%
1900	23,622		15.3%
1910	17,010		−28.0%
1920	21,388		25.7%
1930	28,215		31.9%
1940	30,969		9.8%
1950	33,129		7.0%
1960	36,733		10.9%
1970	39,048		6.3%
1980	50,505		29.3%
1990	59,013		16.8%
2000	74,769		26.7%
2010	88,247		18.0%
2020	99,727		13.0%
2025 (est.)	110,619	▲	10.9%
U.S. Decennial Census; 1790–1960 1900–1990; 1990–2000 2010 2020

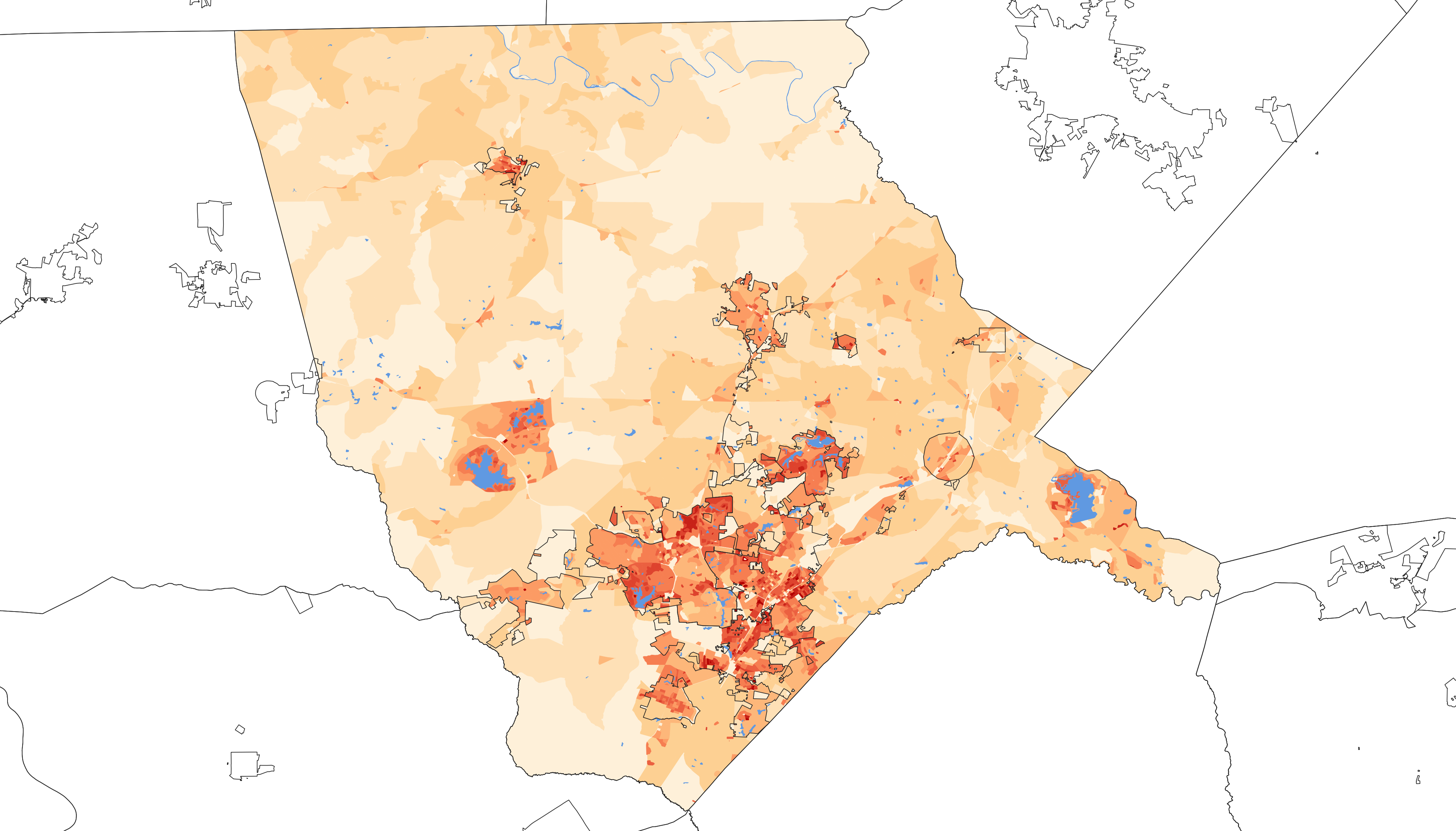
2020 population density of Moore County NC by census block

=== Racial and ethnic composition ===
Moore County, North Carolina – Racial and ethnic composition Note: the US Census treats Hispanic/Latino as an ethnic category. This table excludes Latinos from the racial categories and assigns them to a separate category. Hispanics/Latinos may be of any race.
Race / Ethnicity (NH = Non-Hispanic)	Pop 1980	Pop 1990	Pop 2000	Pop 2010	Pop 2020	% 1980	% 1990	% 2000	% 2010	% 2020
White alone (NH)	39,197	47,260	58,844	68,487	75,391	77.61%	80.08%	78.70%	77.61%	75.60%
Black or African American alone (NH)	10,578	10,832	11,527	11,727	10,545	20.94%	18.36%	15.42%	13.29%	10.57%
Native American or Alaska Native alone (NH)	316	303	486	689	688	0.63%	0.51%	0.65%	0.78%	0.69%
Asian alone (NH)	35	145	325	736	1,237	0.07%	0.25%	0.43%	0.83%	1.24%
Native Hawaiian or Pacific Islander alone (NH)	x	x	27	25	59	x	x	0.04%	0.03%	0.06%
Other race alone (NH)	41	3	39	93	351	0.08%	0.01%	0.05%	0.11%	0.35%
Mixed race or Multiracial (NH)	x	x	540	1,229	4,091	x	x	0.72%	1.39%	4.10%
Hispanic or Latino (any race)	338	470	2,981	5,261	7,365	0.67%	0.80%	3.99%	5.96%	7.39%
Total	50,505	59,013	74,769	88,247	99,727	100.00%	100.00%	100.00%	100.00%	100.00%

=== 2020 census ===
As of the 2020 census, there were 99,727 people, 41,881 households, and 27,191 families residing in the county. The population density was 107 people per square mile (41/km^{2}), and there were 48,237 housing units at an average density of 50 per square mile (19/km^{2}).

The median age was 44.1 years, 21.6% of residents were under the age of 18, and 24.7% were 65 years of age or older. For every 100 females there were 93.5 males, and for every 100 females age 18 and over there were 90.5 males age 18 and over.

The racial makeup of the county was 77.2% White, 10.7% Black or African American, 0.8% American Indian and Alaska Native, 1.3% Asian, 0.1% Native Hawaiian and Pacific Islander, 3.4% from some other race, and 6.6% from two or more races. Hispanic or Latino residents of any race comprised 7.4% of the population.

50.5% of residents lived in urban areas, while 49.5% lived in rural areas.

Of the 41,881 households in the county, 27.2% had children under the age of 18 living in them. Of all households, 52.3% were married-couple households, 16.6% were households with a male householder and no spouse or partner present, and 26.6% were households with a female householder and no spouse or partner present. About 28.9% of all households were made up of individuals and 15.0% had someone living alone who was 65 years of age or older.

Of the 48,237 housing units, 13.2% were vacant. Among occupied housing units, 75.2% were owner-occupied and 24.8% were renter-occupied. The homeowner vacancy rate was 2.1% and the rental vacancy rate was 12.0%.

Compared to the rest of the state, the population of the county is older and more white. For the first time, the census classified the municipalities of Pinehurst, Southern Pines, Aberdeen, Pinebluff, Taylortown, and Whispering Pines as constituting a contiguous urban area, due to the combined population of those areas exceeding 50,000 people.

Between 2010 and 2020, Moore County grew by 11,480 residents. The North Carolina Office of State Budget and Management projected in 2023 that the county's population will grow to be 146,972 in 2040 and 170,097 in 2050.

== Law and government ==
=== Government ===
Carthage is the seat of Moore County. The county's government is led by a five-member board of commissioners. The commissioners are elected at-large but represent districts in which they reside. The board is responsible for levying taxes and appropriating county funds, issuing ordinances within the confines of state law, and overseeing county government administration. The commissioners appoint a county manager who leads the everyday function of county administration under the commissioners' direction. They also appoint their own clerk, a county attorney, and a tax administrator. In addition to the commissioners, county voters elect a register of deeds.

Moore County is a member of the Triangle J Council of Governments, a regional planning body. It is located in North Carolina's 9th congressional district, the North Carolina Senate's 21st district, and the North Carolina House of Representatives' 51st, 52nd, and 78th districts.

=== Judicial system ===
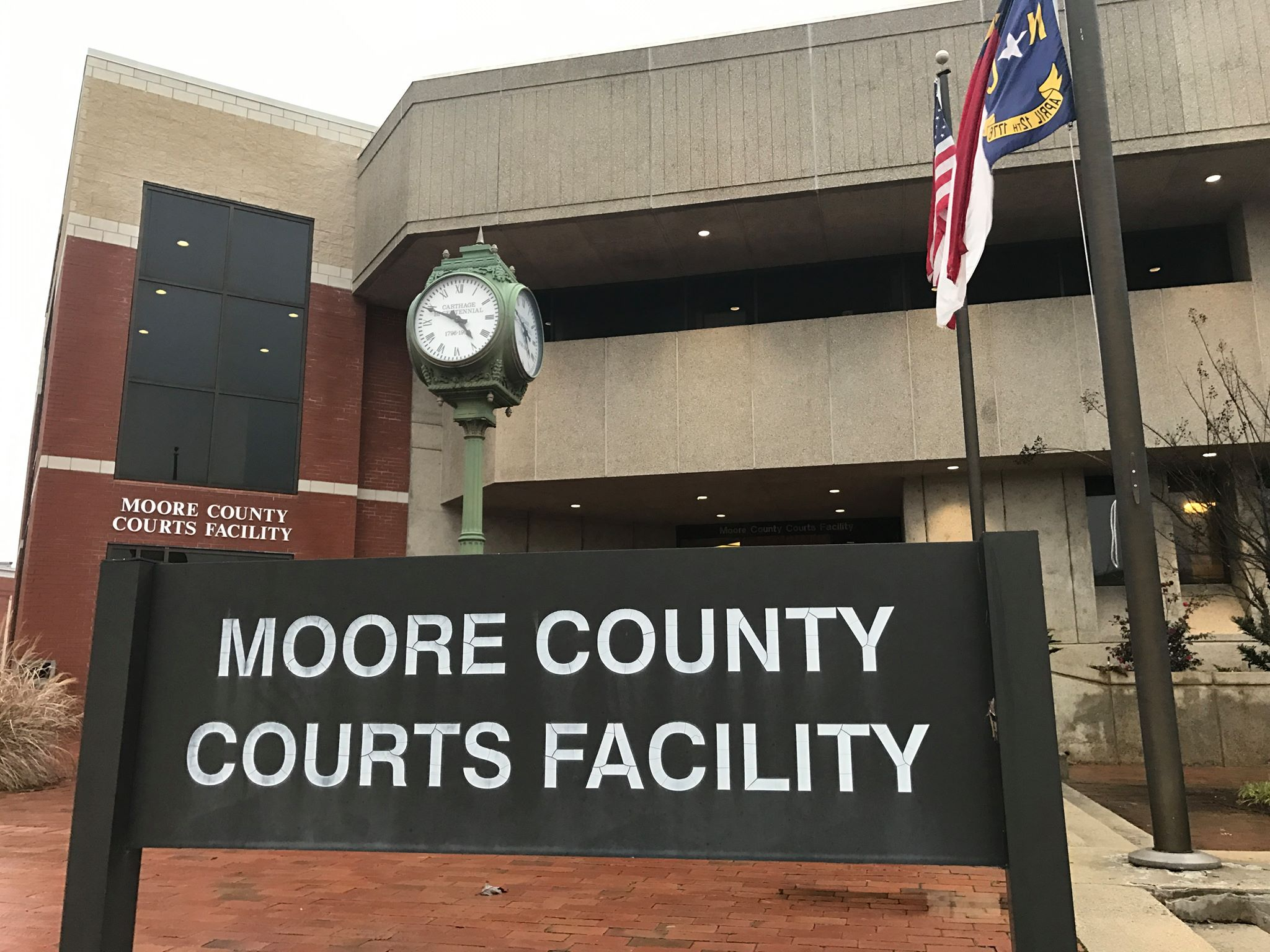
Moore County Courts Facility

Moore County lies within the bounds of North Carolina's 29th Prosecutorial District, the 19D Superior Court District, and the 19D District Court District. County voters elect a sheriff.

=== Politics ===
United States presidential election results for Moore County, North Carolina
Year	Republican		Democratic		Third party(ies)	
Year	No.	%	No.	%	No.	%
1880	1,367	48.03%	1,476	51.86%	3	0.11%
1884	1,468	45.32%	1,769	54.62%	2	0.06%
1888	1,826	47.51%	1,955	50.87%	62	1.61%
1892	1,460	37.65%	1,674	43.17%	744	19.19%
1896	1,948	46.75%	2,207	52.96%	12	0.29%
1900	2,029	55.63%	1,606	44.04%	12	0.33%
1904	1,178	44.88%	1,424	54.25%	23	0.88%
1908	1,077	48.84%	1,109	50.29%	19	0.86%
1912	252	11.92%	1,167	55.20%	695	32.88%
1916	1,047	43.52%	1,337	55.57%	22	0.91%
1920	2,279	45.97%	2,679	54.03%	0	0.00%
1924	1,974	41.27%	2,771	57.93%	38	0.79%
1928	3,290	55.49%	2,639	44.51%	0	0.00%
1932	2,459	36.20%	4,287	63.11%	47	0.69%
1936	2,481	35.71%	4,466	64.29%	0	0.00%
1940	2,587	37.40%	4,330	62.60%	0	0.00%
1944	2,663	41.78%	3,711	58.22%	0	0.00%
1948	2,719	40.28%	3,341	49.50%	690	10.22%
1952	5,442	51.79%	5,066	48.21%	0	0.00%
1956	5,238	52.55%	4,729	47.45%	0	0.00%
1960	5,815	51.17%	5,548	48.83%	0	0.00%
1964	5,162	44.71%	6,384	55.29%	0	0.00%
1968	5,322	43.74%	3,583	29.45%	3,263	26.82%
1972	9,406	70.68%	3,627	27.25%	275	2.07%
1976	7,577	50.45%	7,373	49.09%	70	0.47%
1980	10,158	53.71%	8,084	42.75%	669	3.54%
1984	14,681	67.40%	7,063	32.43%	38	0.17%
1988	14,543	65.37%	7,642	34.35%	63	0.28%
1992	12,448	46.81%	9,649	36.29%	4,494	16.90%
1996	14,760	55.74%	9,847	37.19%	1,872	7.07%
2000	19,882	63.52%	11,232	35.88%	187	0.60%
2004	24,714	64.39%	13,555	35.32%	113	0.29%
2008	27,314	60.26%	17,624	38.88%	390	0.86%
2012	29,495	63.55%	16,505	35.56%	415	0.89%
2016	30,490	62.62%	16,329	33.54%	1,873	3.85%
2020	36,764	63.02%	20,779	35.62%	796	1.36%
2024	39,617	64.12%	21,436	34.69%	737	1.19%

Politically, Moore County is dominated by the Republican Party. As of December 2022, the county hosts 15,812 registered Democrats, 31,387 Republicans, four members of the Green Party, 613 Libertarians, and 28,112 unaffiliated voters.

== Economy ==
Moore County residents are on average wealthier than their statewide contemporaries. In mid-2021, the United States Census Bureau reported the county's median annual income as $63,324. As of December 2022, the poverty rate was about nine percent. Healthcare and social assistance, accommodation and food services, and retail are the largest-employing private sectors in Moore. Moore's economy also relies heavily on tourism, largely driven by golfing events. In 2021, the county benefitted from $673 million in tourism spending, giving it the 10th largest tourism economy among North Carolina's counties. Some county residents work in both civilian and military capacities at the U.S. Army's Fort Bragg in neighboring Cumberland County. Some manufacturing also takes place in Moore.

== Transportation ==
Interactive map of Moore County

Public airplane facilities are provided by the Moore County Airport, located near Pinehurst and Southern Pines, though many air travelers opt to fly into Raleigh-Durham International Airport before driving to Moore. A private airport, Gilliam–McConnell Airfield is maintained in Carthage. North–south rail lines are operated by CSX Transportation, with additional short-line rail service provided by the Aberdeen, Carolina and Western Railway and the Aberdeen & Rockfish Railroad Company. Amtrak maintains a passenger rail station in Southern Pines.

=== Major highways ===
- US 1
- US 1 Bus.
- US 15
- US 501
- NC 2
- NC 5
- NC 22
- NC 24
- NC 27
- NC 73
- NC 211
- NC 690
- NC 705

== Education ==
Public primary and secondary education in the county is provided by Moore County Schools. Of the county's K-12 students, 72 percent are enrolled in public schools, 16 percent are enrolled in private and charter schools, and 11 percent are homeschooled. Post-secondary education is provided by the Sandhills Community College, which has its main campus in Moore. SandHoke Early College, a program managed by Hoke County Schools, also uses the campus. According to the 2021 American Community Survey, an estimated 40.8 percent of county residents have attained a bachelor's degree or higher level of education.

== Culture ==
Many Moore County residents helped develop the regional pottery craft centered in Jugtown, Randolph County. The county is host to the Moore County Agricultural Fair, the Carthage Buggy Festival, the Pet Parade and Bark-in-the-Park Festival, and the North Carolina Playwright Festival. The Moore County Hounds hunting club hosts an annual British-style traditional fox hunt, the Blessing of the Hounds, on Thanksgiving Day. Moore County, particularly the Pinehurst–Southern Pines area, host many golf courses and golfing tournaments. Equestrianism is popular in the county. Several area buildings and sites have been listed on the National Register of Historic Places.

== Communities ==
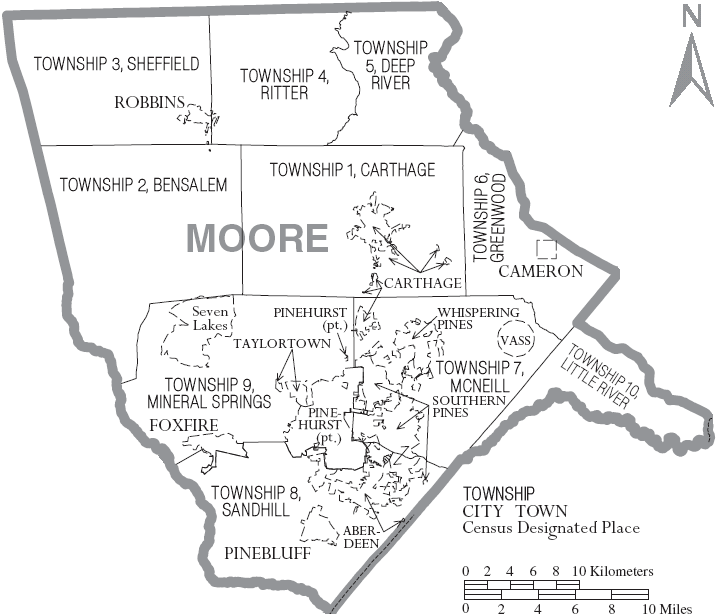
Map of Moore County with municipal and township labels

=== Cities ===
- Carthage (county seat)

=== Towns ===
- Aberdeen
- Cameron
- Pinebluff
- Robbins
- Southern Pines
- Taylortown
- Vass

=== Villages ===
- Foxfire
- Pinehurst (largest community)
- Whispering Pines

=== Townships ===
The county is divided into ten townships, which have no legal or political authority:

- Carthage
- Bensalem
- Sheffields
- Ritter
- Deep River
- Greenwood
- McNeill
- Sandhill
- Mineral Springs
- Little River

=== Census-designated places ===
- Jackson Springs
- Seven Lakes

=== Unincorporated communities ===
- Eagle Springs
- Glendon
- High Falls
- Manly
- West End

== Notable people ==
- Charles Brady (1951–2006), was raised here. He became a physician, career Navy officer, and NASA astronaut
- John Edwards (born 1953), politician, US Senator and former presidential candidate was raised here
- Jeff Hardy (born 1977) and Matt Hardy (born 1974), brothers, were raised here; they are professional wrestlers currently working in Total Nonstop Action Wrestling (TNA) as The Hardy Boyz
- Mable Parker McLean (1922–2012), academic administrator
- Shannon Moore (born 1979), was raised here; he is a wrestler currently working in the Independent Circuit
- Shanann Watts (1984–2018), murdered with her two daughters by her husband Chris in Colorado in 2018

== See also ==
- List of counties in North Carolina
- Moore County substation attack, electrical substation attack in 2022
- National Register of Historic Places listings in Moore County, North Carolina

== Works cited ==
- Bonham, John G. (August 21, 2012), Moore County Working Lands Protection Plan (PDF), North Carolina Department of Environmental Quality
- Corbitt, David Leroy (2000). The formation of the North Carolina counties, 1663-1943 (reprint ed.). Raleigh: North Carolina Division of Archives and History. OCLC 46398241.
- Monroe, Joyce C.; Raeford-Hoke Museum (2011). Hoke County. Arcadia Publishing. ISBN 978-0-7385-8679-3.
- Schloegl, Richard J. (1997). Moore County. Arcadia Publishing. ISBN 9780752405261.
- Town of Southern Pines Comprehensive Long Range Plan (PDF), Town of Southern Pines, March 8, 2016
