= Esthella Provas =

Mexican art dealer

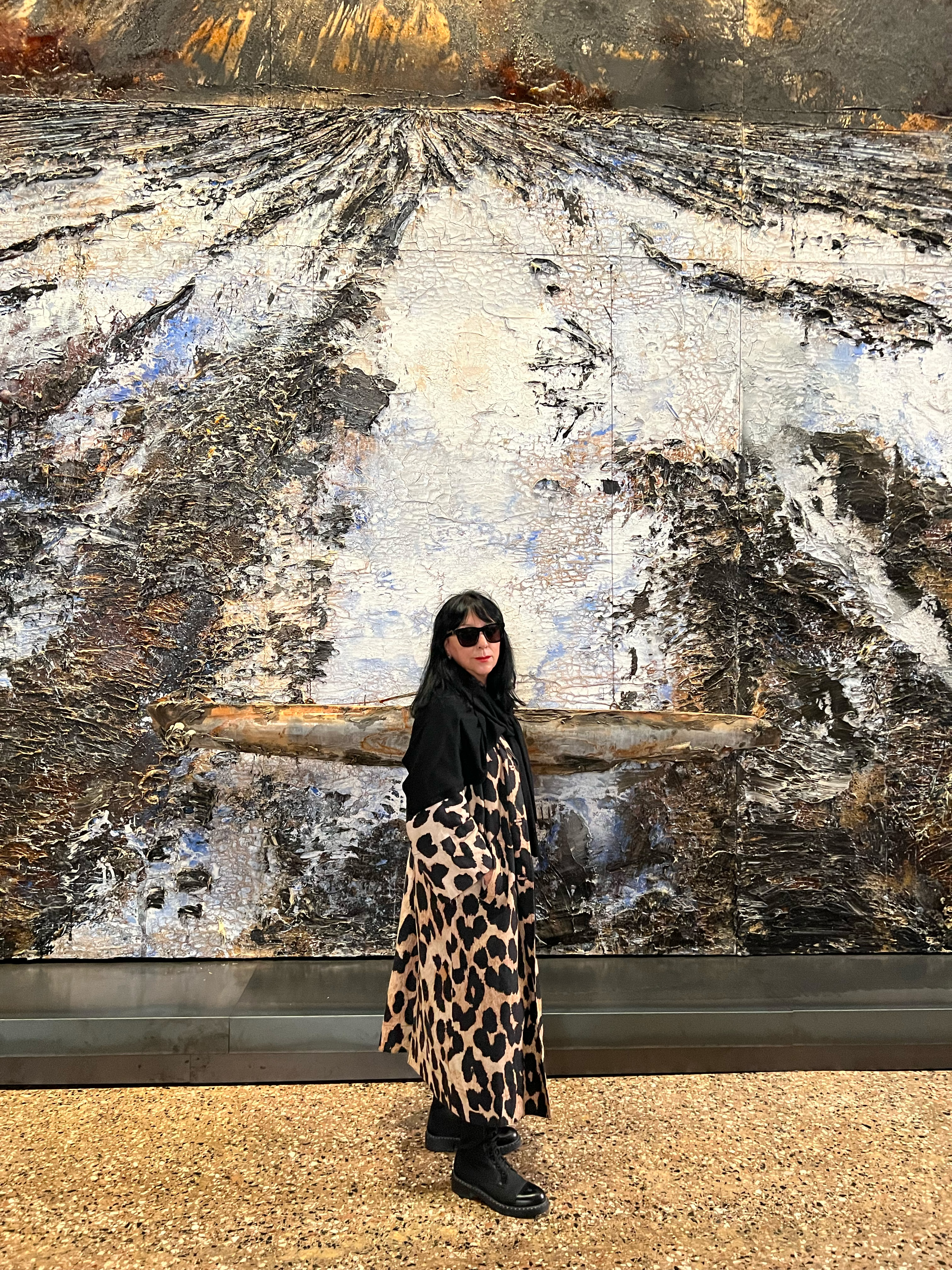
- Esthella Provas at the Venice Biennale
- Born: Nogales, Mexico
- Website: www.esthellaprovas.com

Esthella Provas (born in Nogales, Mexico) is an art dealer regarded as one of the world's most influential art advisors. She is considered pivotal in the creation of the Museo Jumex in Mexico City, Mexico, the largest contemporary art collection in Latin America, and responsible for the collection's acquisitions. According to The New York Times, "With more than 2,800 works, the Colección Jumex is among the largest in Latin America in consultation with Provas."

Since 2023, ARTnews has consecutilvely named Provas' eponymous company, Esthella Provas and Associates, as one of the top art advisories in the world. To compile the list, ARTnews "consulted an array of specialists in the field, including members of the Association of Professional Art Advisors — as they often deal with a distinctive assortment of professionals in building and managing clients’ collections."

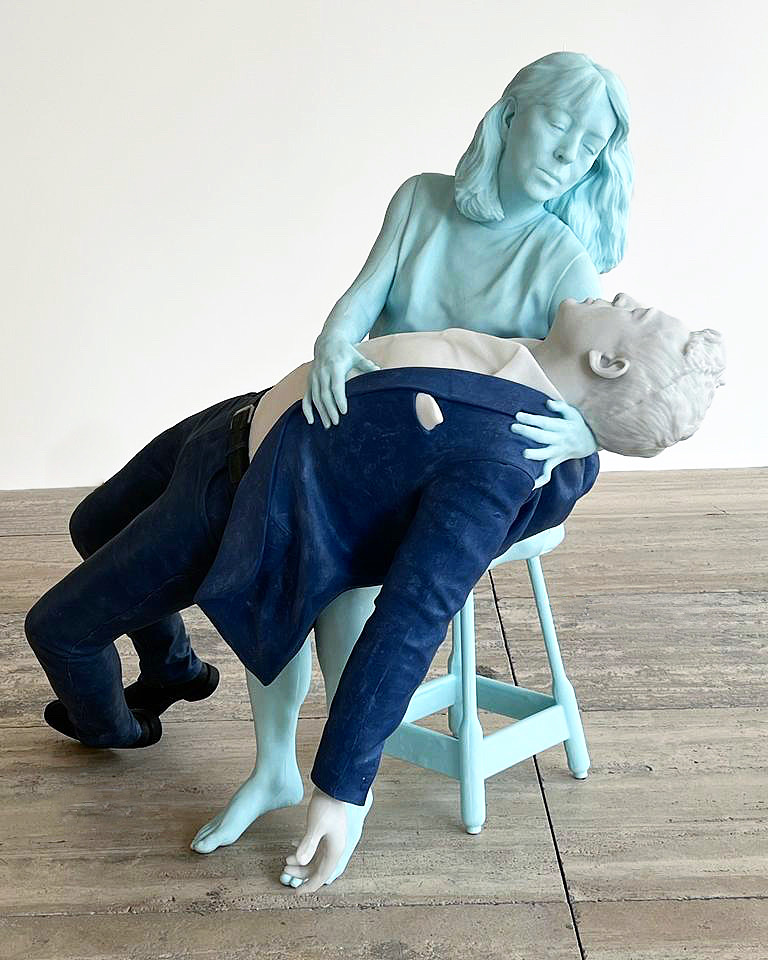
Esthella and Eugenio candle by Urs Fischer at Museo Jumex

== Career ==
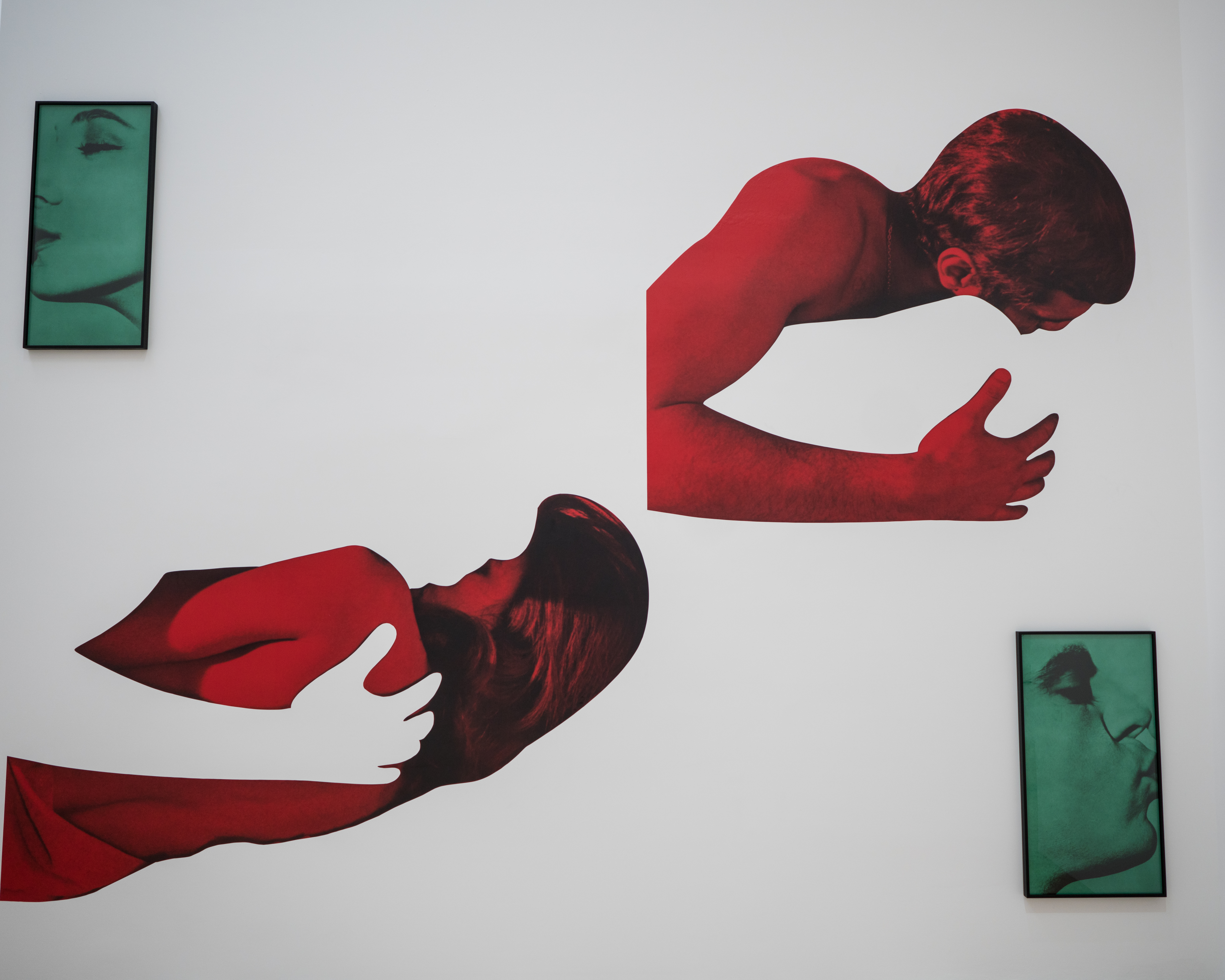
Works by John Baldessari at Museo Jumex

Provas is well-reputed as an art adviser and has been fundamental in building the careers of notable artists, including John Baldessari and Mary Corse. At the start of her career, Provas as described by Forbes as "a striking brunette," worked for Hanson Galleries in Beverly Hills, California. In the 1990s, Provas co-founded Chac Mool Gallery with Eugenio López Alonso in Los Angeles, California, which was a fixture in the Southern California art scene until its closing in 2006. They originally met in 1993 in Beverly Hills when López Alonso walked into Provas' gallery. Initially López Alonso and Provas dealt in contemporary Latin American art but grew their program to encompass international and local legends like Charles Arnoldi, Robert Graham, Edward Ruscha, Robert Ryman, Kenneth Noland, Bernar Venet, and Robert Gober.

Provas is a decisive figure in the international art world. She is a co-founder of the Latin American International Art Council for the Museum of Contemporary Art, Los Angeles. Provas is a Development Consultant for the Los Angeles County Museum of Art's Latin American Initiatives and serves as a member of the museum's Director's Circle. In addition to her involvement in the institutional world, Provas was the Chair of LAXART and a founding member of the Los Angeles Nomadic Division. Provas is an avid supporter of AmfAR in Mexico City and has hosted auction dinners with López Alonso featuring performances by Gloria Gaynor and Grace Jones.

Known for her high-profile clientele and characteristic Cleopatra-styled bob haircut, Provas is frequently seen on the art world circuit at globally recognized art fairs including Art Basel, Frieze Art Fair, Zona Maco, The Armory Show, and The European Fine Art Fair. With Chac Mool Gallery, Provas exhibited at the first Art Basel Miami Beach, helping raise the fair's profile to an international audience. She was also the first to buy a booth at the Zona Maco art fair in Mexico City with her gallery. For the Getty’s Pacific Standard Time: LA/LA initiative in 2017, she co-curated a show of Mexican artists at Kohn Gallery.

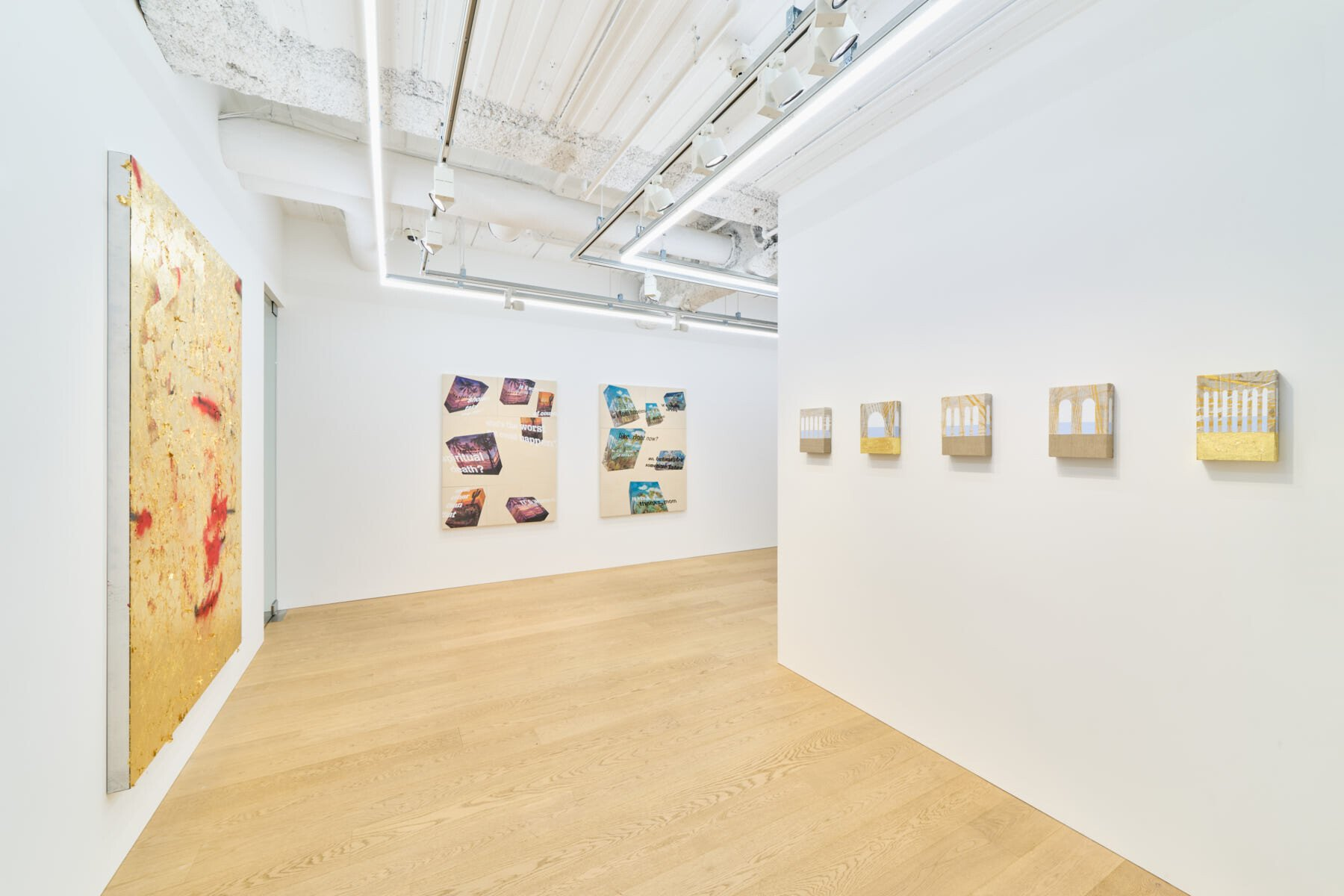
Esthella Provas curated an exhibition at Kotaro Nukaga gallery in Tokyo, Japan

In 2024, Provas curated an exhibition with Kotaro Nukaga in Roppongi, Tokyo, Japan featuring works by artists Amadour, Stefan Brüggemann, Jose Dávila, Michael Rikio Ming Hee Ho, and Rirkrit Tiravanija. She also curated an exhibition with Galería OMR in Los Angeles featuring works by Doug Aitken, Atelier Van Lieshout, Claudia Comte, Simon Fujiwara, Alicja Kwade, and Tony Matelli.

=== Influence ===
In 2022, artist Urs Fischer made a candle for his retrospective exhibition 'Lovers' at the Museo Jumex featuring Provas and Jumex president Eugenio López Alonso.

Notable milliner Gladys Tamez designed a panama hat inspired by Provas' distinctive style.

=== Museo Jumex ===
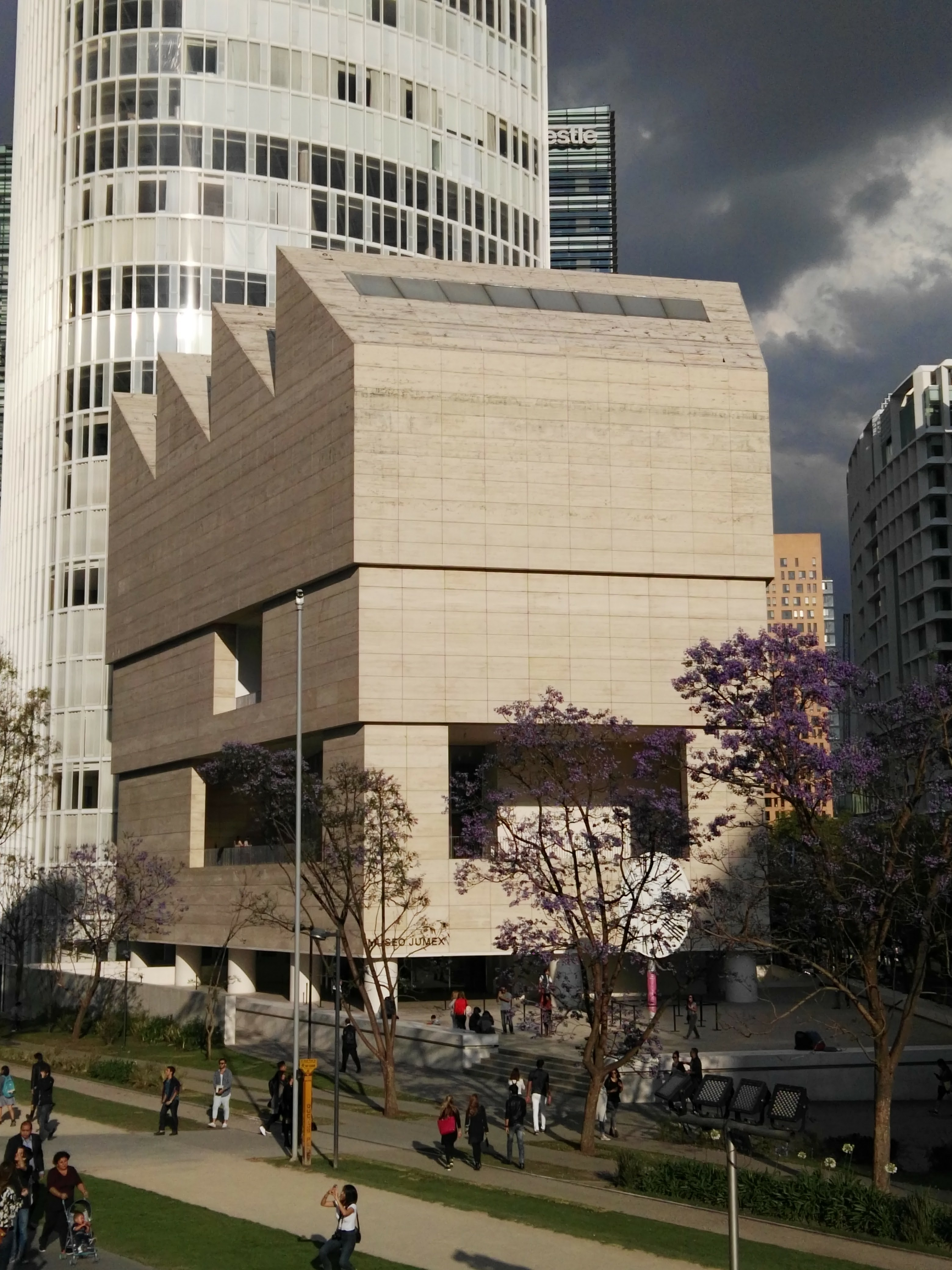
Museo Jumex exterior

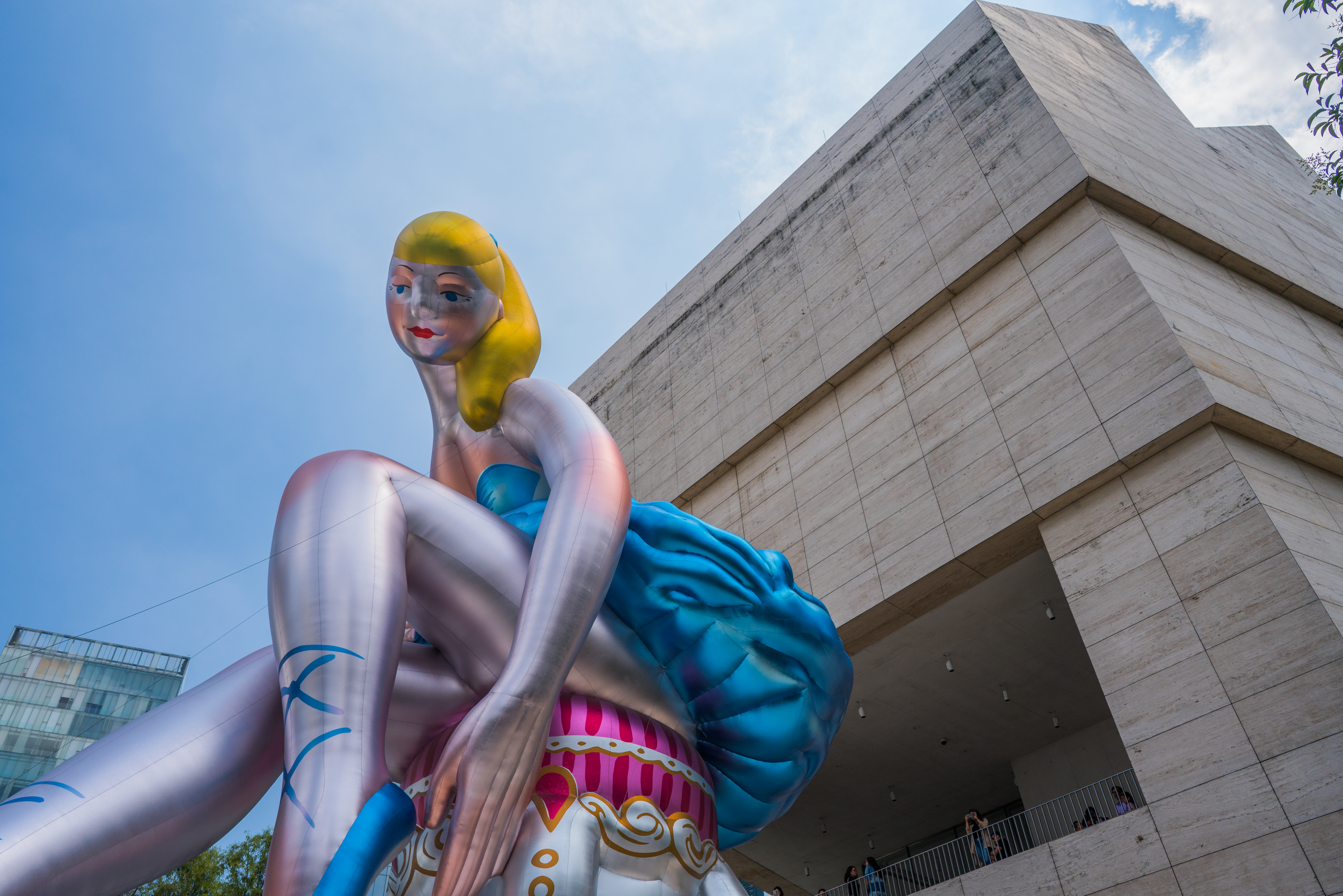
Jeff Koons Sculpture outside Museo Jumex

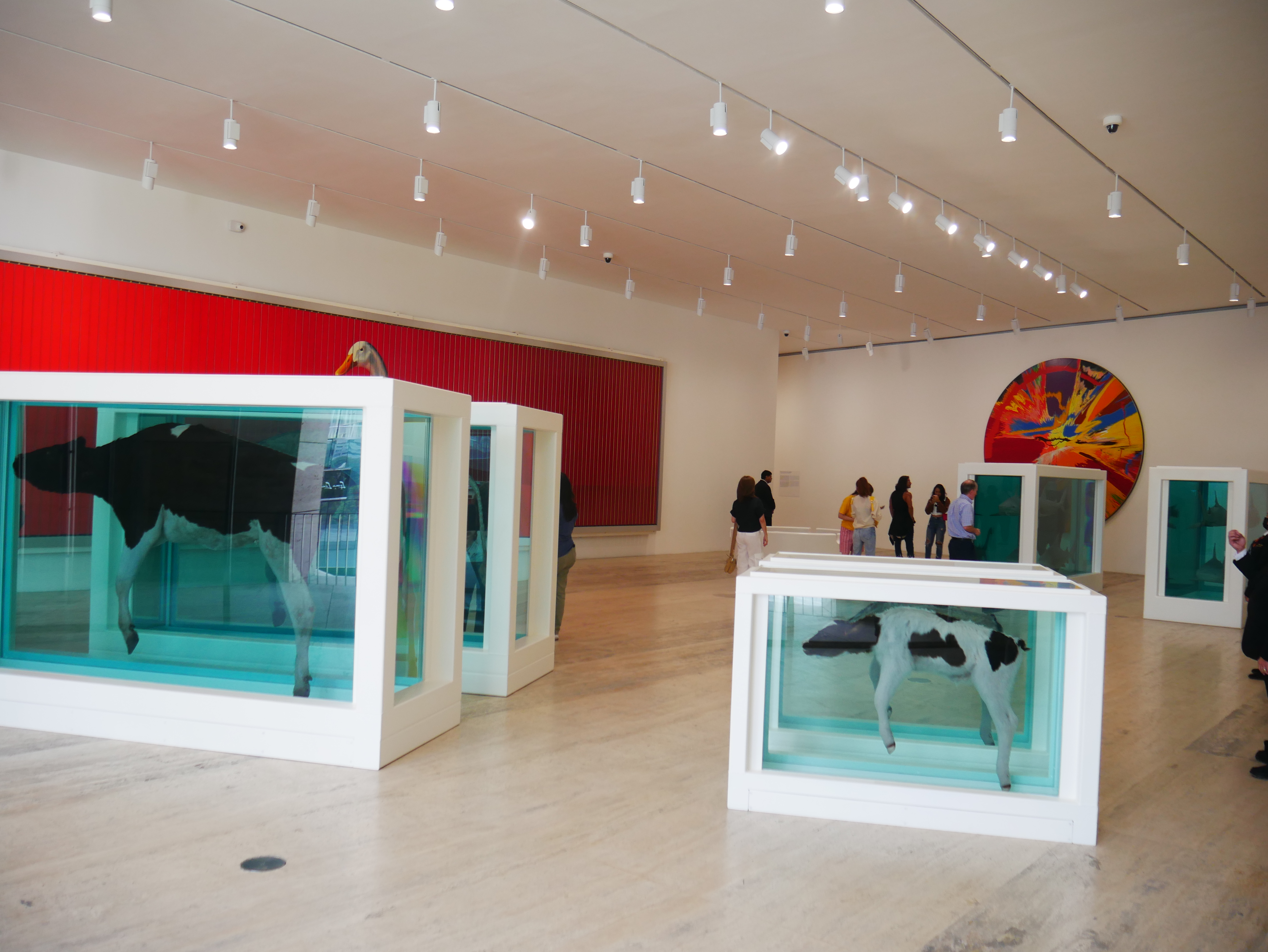
Damien Hirst works at Museo Jumex

She also is responsible for guiding the acquisitions of the Colección Jumex with artists including Richard Prince, Francis Alÿs, Alighiero Boetti, Gego, Donald Judd, Glenn Ligon, Nancy Rubins, Jeff Koons, Gabriel Orozco, Mariana Castillo Deball, Jose Dávila, Pia Camil, Richard Serra, Julie Mehretu, Lucio Fontana, Andy Warhol, Louise Bourgeois, Damien Hirst, Bosco Sodi, Abraham Cruzvillegas, Catherine Opie, Lari Pittman, Jannis Kounellis, Tracey Emin, Minerva Cuevas, Dan Graham, Charles Ray, Rudolf Stingel, Lucio Fontana, Andreas Gursky, Sol LeWitt, and Ellsworth Kelly. Provas has also curated exhibitions with artists Chris Levine, Mario García Torres, Jill Magid Micol Hebron and Jorge Méndez Blake.

== Personal life ==
Provas lives and works in Los Angeles, California.
