= Kotaro Nukaga =

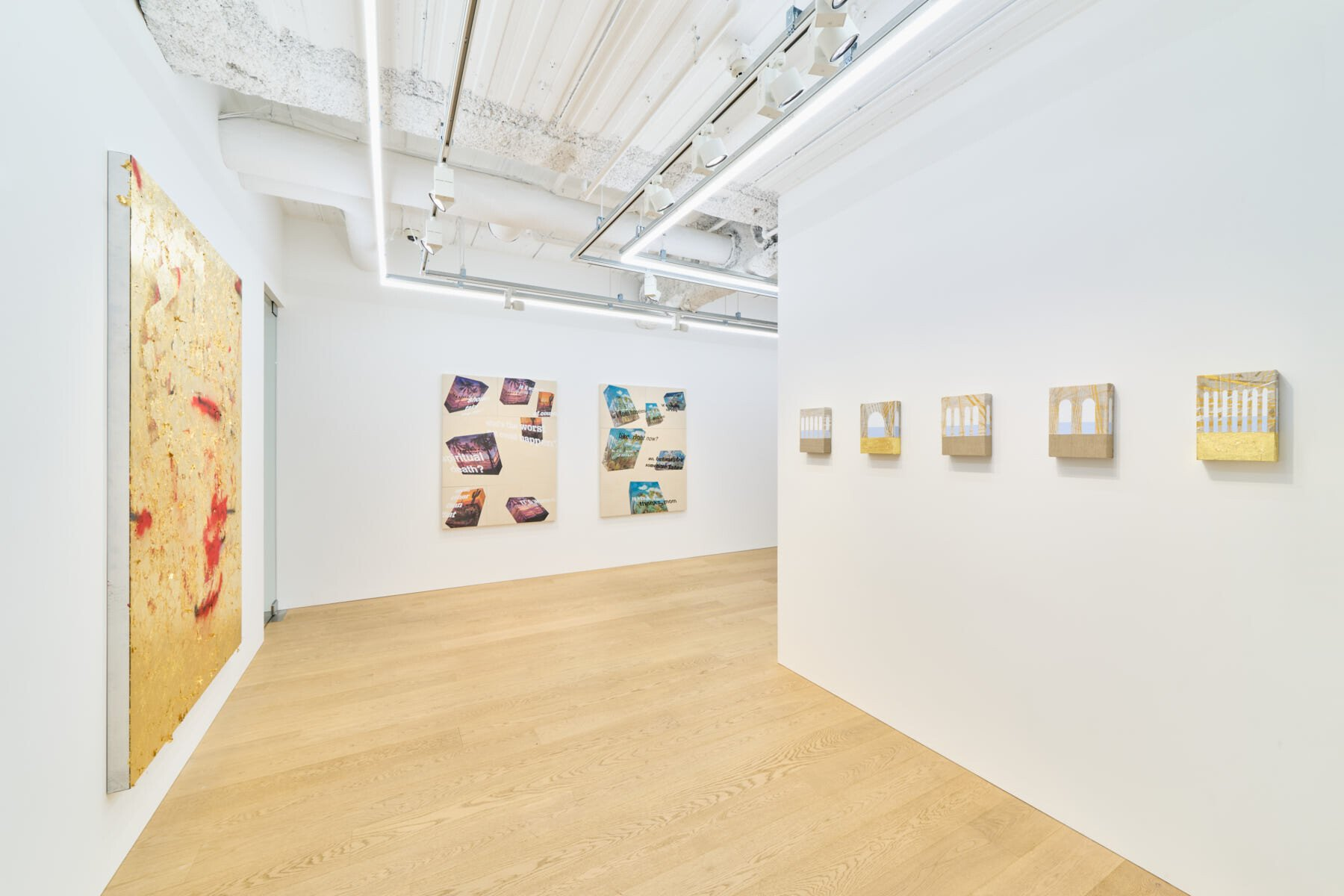
- Exhibition at Kotaro Nukaga, Tokyo
- Established: 2018
- Location: Roppongi, Tokyo, Japan
- Type: Contemporary art gallery
- Owner: Kotaro Nukaga
- Website: http://kotaronukaga.com

Kotaro Nukaga is a contemporary art gallery owned by gallerist Kotaro Nukaga. Headquartered in the Roppongi neighborhood of Tokyo, the gallery operates multiple exhibition spaces including at the Terrada Art Complex in Tennōz and central Ginza. Nukaga expressed to The New York Times that one of his primary goals is to "make a stronger market for women artists."

Kotaro Nukaga opened in 2018. Its program emphasizes cross-cultural exchange and positions artists within broader historical and global contexts. Since its founding, Kotaro Nukaga has become a prominent platform within the international art market, contributing to the global visibility of its artists and to the circulation of contemporary art between Japan and abroad.

Artists currently represented and exhibited by Kotaro Nukaga include Candida Höfer, Stefan Brüggemann, Michael Rikio Ming Hee Ho, Keita Morimoto, Inka Essenhigh, Nir Hod, Carlos Rolón, Tony Matelli, Sayre Gomez, Huma Bhabha, Marilyn Minter, Erwin Wurm, Firelei Báez, Jose Dávila, Rirkrit Tiravanija, Amadour, Idris Khan, Annie Morris, and Tomokazu Matsuyama. Kotaro Nukaga is active at art fairs around the world, including The Armory Show, Art Basel Switzerland, Singapore's ART SG, Tokyo Gendai, Frieze Seoul, and Art Basel Hong Kong. Guest curators include esteemed art world figures such as Esthella Provas of Museo Jumex.
