= Amadour =

American artist, musician, and writer (born 1995)

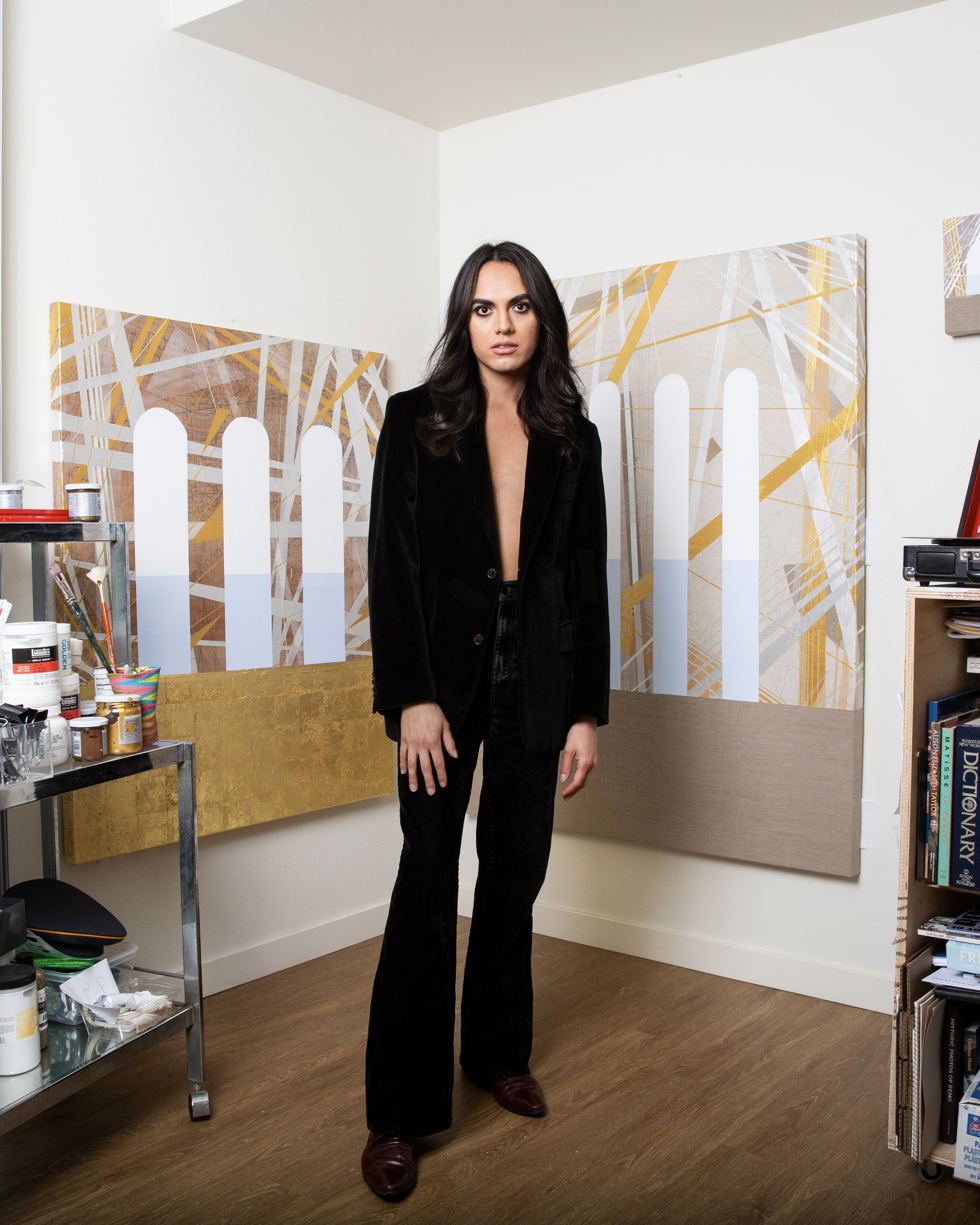
- Amadour in their Hollywood studio
- Born: May 1, 1995 (age 31); Sparks, Nevada, U.S.
- Education: University of California, Los Angeles; Santa Monica College; Truckee Meadows Community College
- Known for: Visual art, singer, songwriter, pianist, writer
- Movement: Geometric abstraction, Hard-edge painting, Light and Space
- Website: https://www.amadour.com

Amadour (born May 1, 1995, in Sparks, Nevada) is an American interdisciplinary artist, musician, and writer. Their practice spans painting, songwriting, and composition, often combining geometric abstraction with orchestral pop and cultural criticism. Recognized as "The Voice of Nevada" and "The High Desert Balladeer," Amadour's work addresses diasporic memory, queer subjectivity, and erased narratives through a perspective rooted in a Latinx experience in Nevada and the American West.

== Early life ==
Amadour was born in Sparks, Nevada, and grew up in Reno, Nevada, and Sausalito, California, to parents of Colombian and Mexican descent. Having studied at Galena High School and the ACE High School in Reno, they left high school and later received a General Educational Development (GED) certificate at Truckee Meadows Community College. They went on to move to Miami, Florida to develop their musical sound with producer Mark Hudson. They then took songwriting courses at Westlake Recording Studios in West Hollywood, California with producer Doug Fenske.

== Education ==
Amadour attended Santa Monica College and participated in the school's arts incubator SMC Art Mentor Program. They transferred to the University of California, Los Angeles, where they studied under Barbara Kruger, Mary Kelly, Saloni Mathur, and Lari Pittman, receiving dual degrees in fine art and art history. They also worked as a studio assistant for photographer David LaChapelle on projects including Travis Scott's Astroworld.

== Career ==
Amadour's paintings are characterized by layered acrylics, gold leaf, and graphite, and often depict the California Incline in Santa Monica, California. Their paintings also heavily focus on their home state, Nevada, with a focus on contemporary Latinx labor histories in relation to the history of the Comstock Lode, Virginia City, Nevada, and Lake Tahoe. They explicitly "reject the idea of the American West as an empty frontier" and use their art to highlight architectural and civic memory.

Institutional exhibitions include a 2026 exhibition Nevada Proscenium at Truckee Meadows Community College and a 2027 exhibition The Mapes Suite at the Nevada State Museum, Carson City, related to the historic Mapes Hotel. Amadour has exhibited internationally, including with Kotaro Nukaga in Tokyo, FF Projects in San Pedro Garza García, and Emma Scully Gallery in New York City. They have participated in The Armory Show (New York) and Tokyo Gendai (Yokohama). Amadour's work has been included in exhibitions placing it in dialogue with canonical modern figures such as Henri Matisse and Joan Miró. More recent group exhibitions have included artists such as Rirkrit Tiravanija, Brian Eno, Jose Dávila, Mario García Torres, Ryan Gander, Michael Rikio Ming Hee Ho, and Candida Höfer.

Their essays and interviews have appeared in Frieze, ARTnews, and The Brooklyn Rail. Their writing has been cited by ArtReview, Monthly Art, Sotheby's, and archived at the Getty Research Institute. Amadour has written on land art in relation to the work of Nancy Holt, Robert Smithson, and Michael Heizer in Nevada, and has contributed writing on Richard Diebenkorn for institutional publications. Amadour has conducted interviews with artists including Tacita Dean, William Kentridge, Luc Tuymans, George Condo, Jónsi of Sigur Rós, George Clinton, and Idina Menzel.

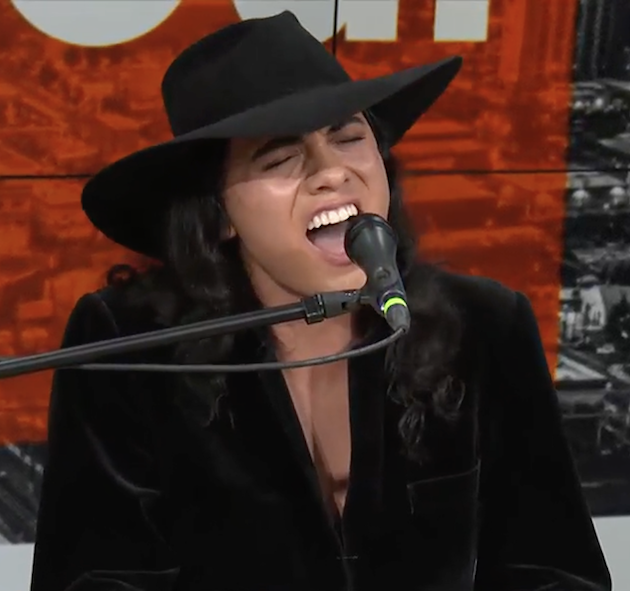
Amadour performing live at Northern Nevada Pride

As a musician, Amadour released the EP Western Movie Dream (2023) and is developing an orchestral pop EP The Myth of Amadour: Odyssey of a High Desert Balladeer with producer Jordan Koop who engineered Orville Peck's Pony, composer Alan G. Frausto, and the Pannonia Film Orchestra in Budapest. They have performed at Hotel Café, The Viper Room, Palm Springs Pride, Northern Nevada Pride, Nevada Pride, and with Rivers Cuomo of Weezer. They have collaborated with Rudy Pérez and Jon Secada. Amadour is known for wearing hats designed by Gladys Tamez.

They has been discussed by critics and curators, including Roselee Goldberg, Shana Nys Dambrot, Esthella Provas, and David Roussève.

=== Media coverage ===
Their early work in fashion was featured at the 59th Grammy Awards and across media including The New York Times, Elle, Teen Vogue and other publications. During Frieze Los Angeles, Artforum critic Andrew Berardini mentioned Amadour in his column on the fair, noting their presence within the city's art community.

== Personal life ==
Amadour is nonbinary and uses they/them pronouns. Amadour's uncle, Domingo Tibaduiza, is an Olympic long-distance runner.
