= Tokyo Gendai =

Tokyo Gendai is an international contemporary art fair first held in 2023 in Yokohama, Kantõ, Japan. Developed by The Art Assembly, a joint venture between AngusMontgomery Arts and Tim Etchells, the fair was established to create a global platform for contemporary art in Japan. Tokyo Gendai brings together leading galleries worldwide and presents modern and contemporary art, including painting, sculpture, and multimedia installations.

The fair features curated sectors, talks, and public programming, and is designed to foster connections between Japanese and international art scenes. It focuses on established and emerging artists and engages collectors, institutions, and curators from Asia and beyond. Since it began, Tokyo Gendai has been a significant addition to the global art fair calendar and a key platform for contemporary art in Japan.

Notable artists by edition

Artists whose work has been presented at Tokyo Gendai include:

2025

Larry Poons, Mehdi Ghadyanloo, John Giorno, Elmgreen & Dragset, Ugo Rondinone, Yayoi Kusama, Hiroshi Senju, Leiko Ikemura, Tomokazu Matsuyama, Keita Morimoto, Candida Höfer, Michael Rikio Ming Hee Ho, Amadour, Tschabalala Self, Shara Hughes, and Rember Yahuarcani. Participating galleries included Kotaro Nukaga, Almine Rech, Sadie Coles HQ, Pace Gallery, Kaikai Kiki, and other international exhibitors.

2024

Ai Weiwei, Robert Longo (solo presentation with Pace Gallery), Alex Da Corte, Jenny Holzer, Carsten Nicolai, Ha Chong Hyun, Kim Tschang-yeul, Yoshitomo Nara, Hiroshi Sugimoto, Kishio Suga, and Trevor Shimizu. Participating galleries included Perrotin, Pace Gallery, Almine Rech, Sadie Coles HQ, and other international exhibitors.

2023 (inaugural edition)

Yayoi Kusama, Lee Ufan, Kunié Sugiura, Ryoji Ikeda, and Yurie Nagashima. Participating galleries included leading Japanese and international galleries.
