= Michael Rikio Ming Hee Ho =

American conceptual artist

- Born: 1996 (age 29–30); Hilo, Hawaii
- Known for: Visual art
- Movement: Contemporary art
- Website: https://kotaronukaga.com/en/artist/マイケル・リキオ・ミング・ヒー・ホー/

Michael Rikio Ming Hee Ho (マイケル・リキオ・ミング・ヒー・ホー, born August 1, 1996) is an American conceptual artist.

== Early life ==
Ho was born in Hilo, Hawaii and grew up in Waimea, Hawaii County, Hawaii.

== Education ==
He graduated from UCLA School of the Arts and Architecture in 2018 and lives and works in Tokyo, Japan. Ho studied at University of California, Los Angeles with artists Barbara Kruger, Lari Pittman, Adrian Wong, Catherine Opie, and Adrian Saxe.

== Career ==
Ho is known for his text-based works that are reminiscent of Jenny Holzer and Lawrence Weiner. Ho’s work has been noted for its juxtaposition of text and image to introduce irony and deflate pictorial grandeur, drawing comparisons to Ed Ruscha. In 2022, ARTnews, included Ho in their list for "30 artists under 35". Gallerist Pearl Lam shared with Artnet that Ho's "painting and sculptural practice semantically responds to capturing the tone of a post social-media generation and exploring the theme of internalized masochism and the way that this can be communicated linguistically." In 2024, he participated in a group exhibition curated by Esthella Provas at Kotaro Nukaga, alongside Stefan Brüggemann, Jose Dávila, Amadour, and Rirkrit Tiravanija.

His work has been exhibited in New York, Hong Kong, Tokyo, Los Angeles, and South Korea including at the Sezon Museum of Modern Art, Watarium Museum, Osaka Kansai International Art Festival, Tokyo Gendai, and Kotaro Nukaga.
