= Powerlong =

Chinese real estate company

- Native name: 寶龍地產
- Romanized name: Bǎolóng Dìchǎn
- Industry: Real Estate Development
- Founded: 1990; 35 years ago in Macau
- Founder: Xu Jiankang (Hoi Kin Hong)
- Headquarters: Fujian, China
- Number of employees: 9,718 (2018)

Powerlong Real Estate Holdings Limited (Chinese: 寶龍地產) is a Fujian-based Chinese real estate development company, listed on the Hong Kong stock exchange.

Powerlong was founded in Macau by Xu Jiankang (Hoi Kin Hong) in 1990. It employs 9,718 people, and has a land bank of 14.1 million square meters.

In November 2017, it opened the 23,000 square meter Powerlong Art Museum in Qibao, Shanghai.
