= FF Projects =

- Established: 2008
- Location: San Pedro Garza Garcia, Los Angeles
- Type: Contemporary art gallery
- Owner: Eduardo Lopez
- Website: http://ffprojects.org

FF Projects is an art gallery in San Pedro Garza García, Mexico and Los Angeles, California.

Founded by Mexican art dealer Eduardo Lopez, the gallery opened its doors in 2008 in Miami and later in New York City in the summer of 2009. With the intention of establishing itself in Mexico, it changed its space to Mexico City and later to Monterrey, where its main headquarters are currently located. FF Projects focuses on long lasting relationships with an international roster of multidisciplinary artists including Ryan Gander, Amadour, Bosco Sodi, Mario García Torres, Stefan Brüggemann, Peter Saville, Brian Eno, and Helmut Lang.

FF Projects is known for closely collaborating with institutions and museums including the Museo de Arte Contemporáneo de Monterrey and Colección Jumex.

FF Projects also publishes text works through FF Projects Publications.
