= Sezon Museum of Modern Art =

Coordinates: 36.3699°N 138.5808°E

- セゾン現代美術館

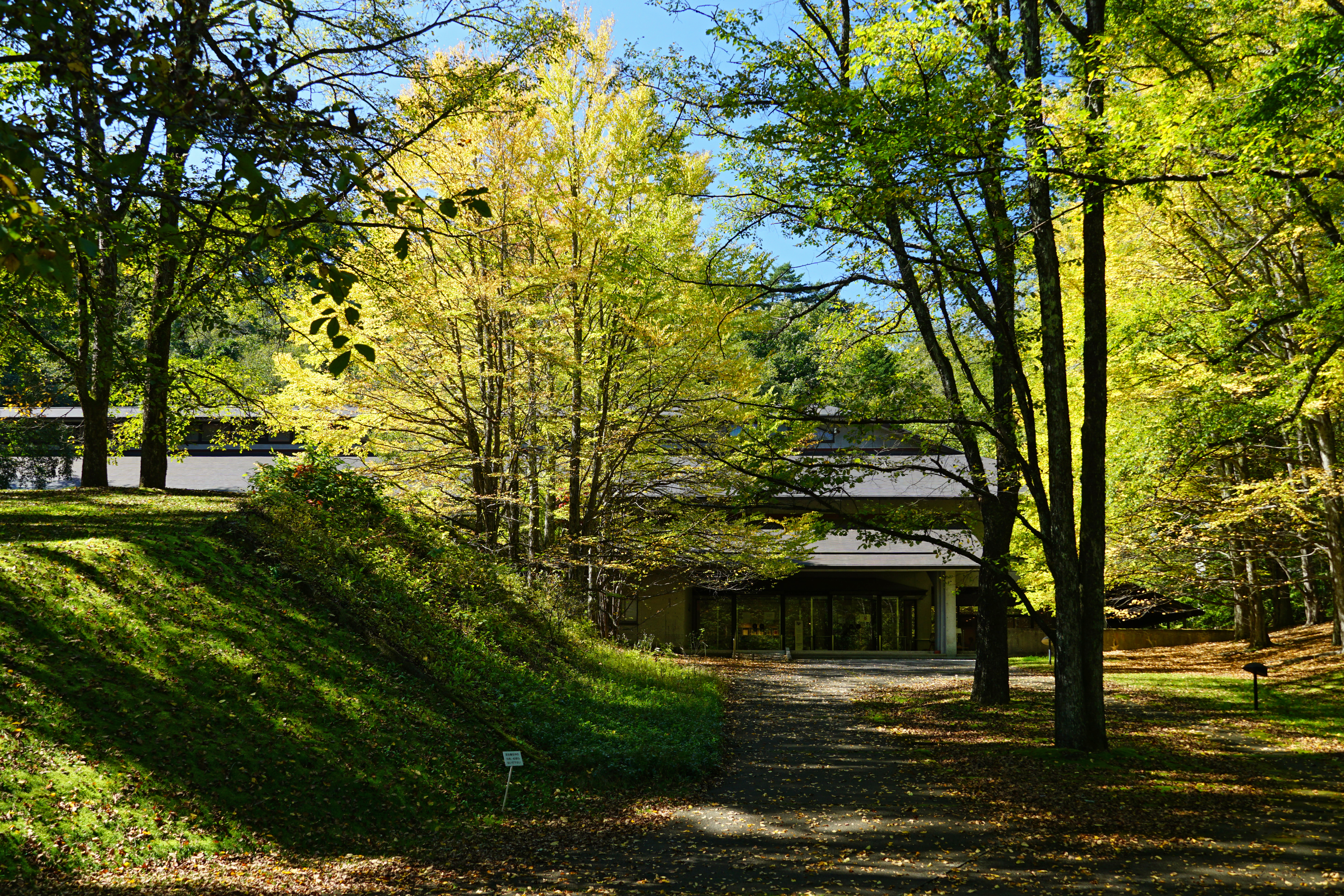
- Established: 1981
- Location: 2140 Serigasawa, Nagakura, Karuizawa, Kitasaku, Nagano 389-0111, Japan
- Type: Art Museum
- Architect: Kiyonori Kikutake
- Website: www.smma.or.jp/en/

The Sezon Museum of Modern Art is an art museum located in Karuizawa, Nagano Prefecture, Japan. The museum hosts exhibitions on contemporary art.

== History ==
The intention with creating this museum was to preserve the works of Yasujiro Tsutsumi. Founded in 1962 as the Tanakawa Museum, the facility was moved to Karuizawa City in 1981. In 1991, the name was changed to Sezon Museum of Modern Art. The museum also preserves and exhibits the collection of the Saison Museum, which was closed in 1999.

The museum building was designed to blend in with the natural surroundings of Karuizawa City. The sculptures in the garden were designed by Isamu Wakabayashi.

== Collections ==
The museum contains about 500 pieces of art. The museum has works by Japanese artists such as Isamu Noguchi, Shusaku Arakawa, Hisao Domoto and Michael Rikio Ming Hee Ho. The museum also contains work by Western artists such as Anselm Kiefer, Mark Rothko and Marcel Duchamp. The museum houses exhibits of abstract art.

== Gallery ==
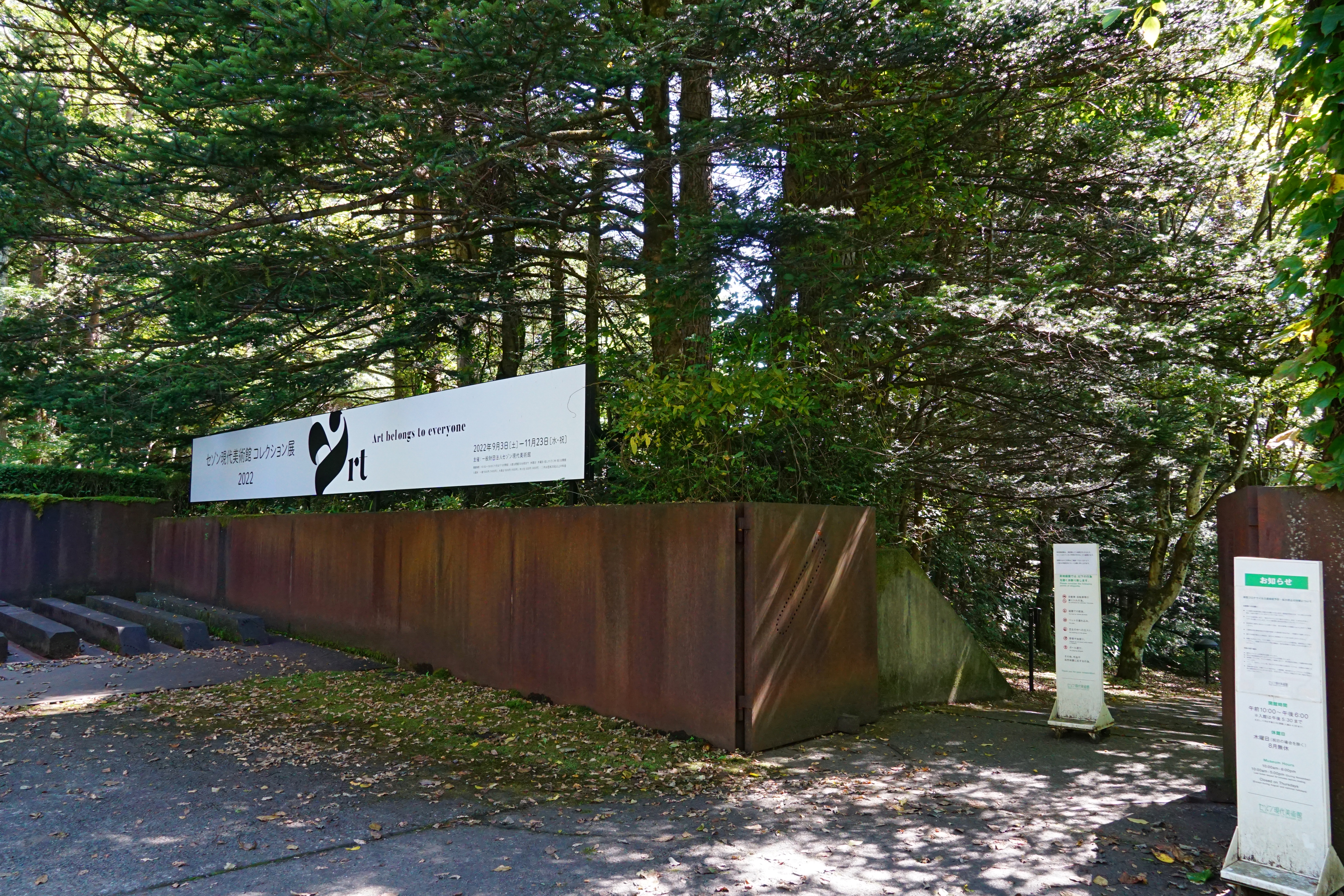
Entrance

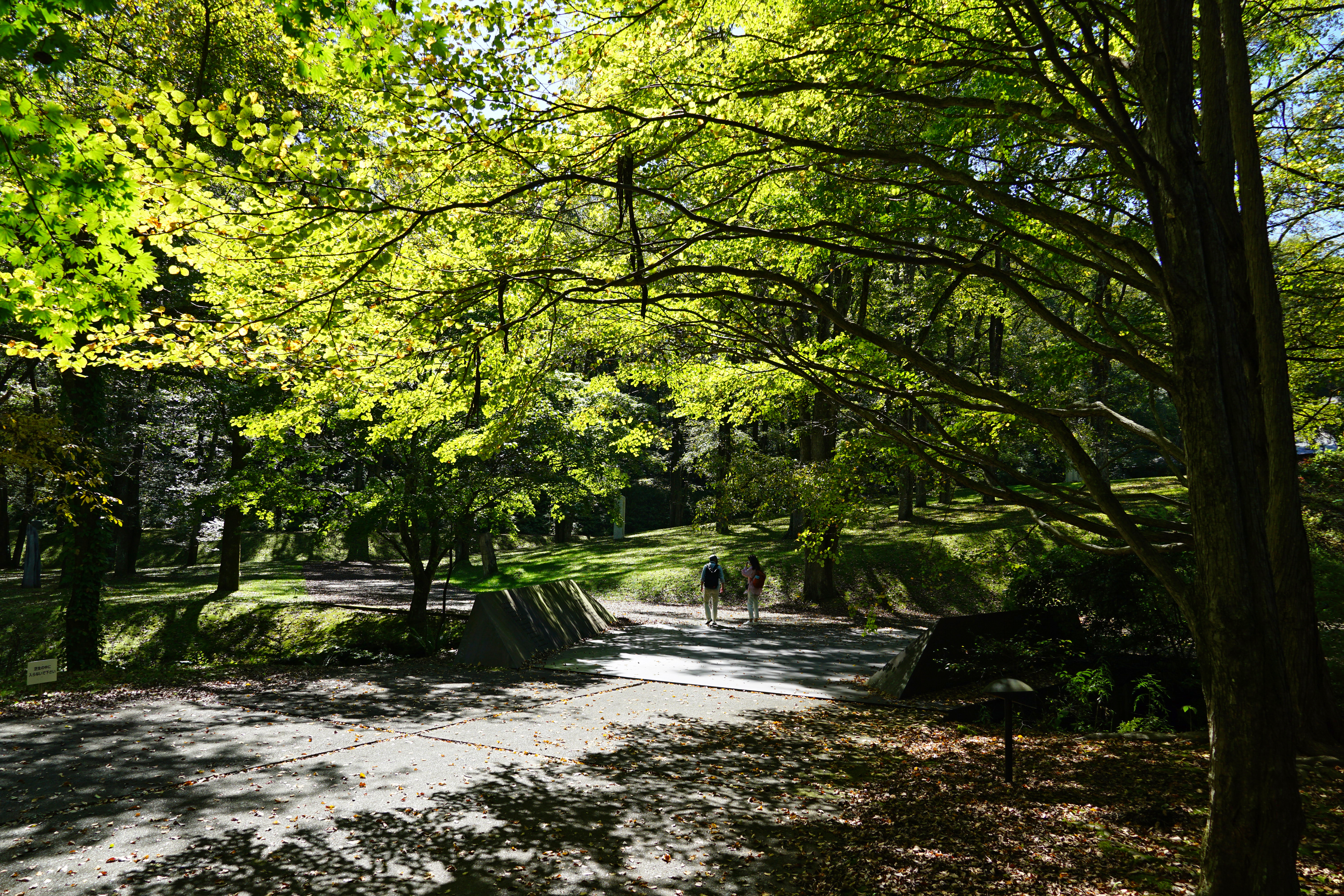
Garden

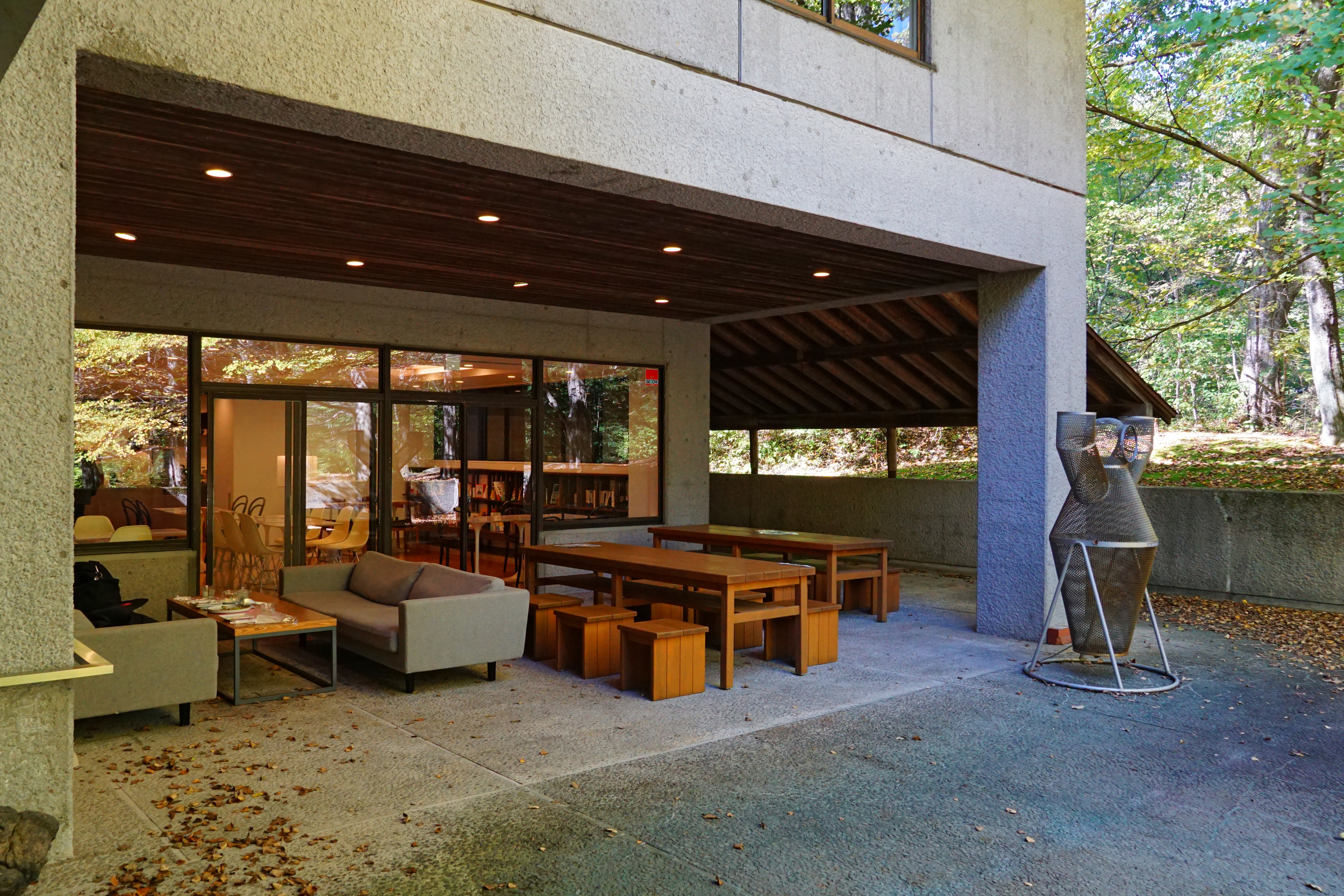
Café × Library
