= Idris Khan =

British artist (born 1978)

Idris Khan OBE
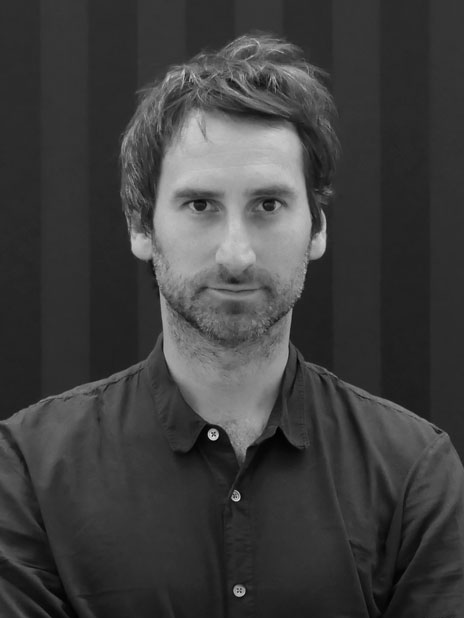
- Khan in 2017
- Born: Idris Khan; 1 December 1978 (age 47); Birmingham, UK
- Education: University of Derby, RCA
- Known for: Fine art, Photography, Painting, drawing, sculpture
- Spouse: Annie Morris
- Awards: American Architecture Award

Idris Khan OBE (born 1978) is a British artist based in London.

Khan's work draws from a diverse range of cultural sources including literature, history, art, music, and religion. He creates densely layered imagery that is both abstract and figurative and addresses narratives of history, cumulative experience and the metaphysical collapse of time into single moments.

== Early life and education ==
Khan was born in Birmingham. His father is from Pakistan and his English mother converted to Islam after meeting his father.

Khan graduated in photography from the University of Derby in 2001, he studied for an MA at the Royal College of Art in 2004.

== Career ==
Khan's photographs or scans originate from secondary source material – for instance, every page of the Qur'an, every Beethoven sonata, every William Turner postcard from Tate Britain, or every Bernd and Hilla Becher spherical gasholder. Khan's interest in Islam and layered imagery can be traced back to his upbringing: It was his father's idea that Khan – himself a non-practicing Muslim – photograph every page of the Qur'an. His work and process have been described as "experiments in compressed memories" and "all-encompassing composites." As Khan describes: "It is a challenge to not define my work as a photograph but using the medium of photography to create something that exists on the surface of the paper and not to be transported back to an isolated moment in time." He takes inspiration from Samuel Barber’s Adagio for Strings and Antonio Vivaldi's The Four Seasons and made a ballet with Wayne McGregor and Max Richter.

Khan's visual layering also occurs in his videos, such as Last Three Piano Sonatas…after Franz Schubert, a three-channel video installation wherein he uses multiple camera angles to capture numerous performances of Schubert's last sonatas, composed on his deathbed.

In 2012, Khan was commissioned by the British Museum in London to create a new wall drawing for the exhibition, Hajj: Journey to the Heart of Islam. In addition to the wall drawing, a sculpture was installed in the museum's Great Court. Also in 2012, The New York Times Magazine commissioned Khan to create a new body of work that was published in their London issue, focusing on iconic sites.

In 2016, Khan was commissioned to build a 42,000 m^{2} (450,000 sq ft) memorial to the war dead of the United Arab Emirates. The sculpture is constructed from seven aluminium-encased steel tablets, cast with poems by emirs of the UAE.

In 2025, the Obama Foundation commissioned Khan to create a ceiling at the Obama Presidential Center in Chicago, featuring hundreds of hand-stamped words from President Barack Obama’s Selma 50th anniversary speech. That same year, he also exhibited in his first exhibition in Japan at Kotaro Nukaga, Tokyo, alongside his wife, Annie Morris.

== Recognition ==
Khan was appointed Officer of the Order of the British Empire (OBE) in the 2017 Birthday Honours for services to art.

== Personal life ==
Khan works from a studio in Stoke Newington, London he shares with his wife, the British artist Annie Morris. They have two children.

== Selected exhibitions ==
- Still Revolution: Suspended in Time, Museum of Contemporary Canadian Art, Toronto, May–June 2009. Group exhibition with Khan, Barbara Astman, Walead Beshty, Mat Collishaw, Stan Douglas, Trevor Paglen, Martha Rosler, and Mikhael Subotzky.
- K20 in Düsseldorf, Germany. Solo exhibition.
- Göteborgs Konsthall, Sweden. Solo exhibition.
- Taidehalli in Helsinki
- Photographic Dialogues between Past, Present and Future, Musée de l'Élysée, Switzerland, 2016. Group exhibition.
- Conflicting Lines, Victoria Miro Gallery, London, 2015. Solo exhibition.
- Saatchi Gallery in London

== Collections ==
Khan's work is held in the following permanent collections:

- Saatchi Collection, London
- San Francisco Museum of Modern Art, San Francisco
- Solomon R. Guggenheim Museum, New York
- Tel Aviv Museum of Art, Israel
- Art Gallery of New South Wales, Sydney
- Philadelphia Museum of Art, Philadelphia, PA
- de young, San Francisco, CA
- Centre Georges Pompidou, Paris
