= Tomokazu Matsuyama =

Japanese contemporary artist

- Born: April 30, 1976 (age 50); Takayama, Gifu, Japan
- Occupation: Visual artist

Tomokazu Matsuyama (松山智一 Matsuyama Tomokazu, born April 30, 1976, in Takayama, Gifu, Japan) is a Japanese contemporary visual artist. Matsuyama lives and works in Brooklyn, New York.

Matsuyama is influenced by a variety of subjects, including Japanese art from the Edo and Meiji eras, classical Greek and Roman statuary, French Renaissance painting, postwar contemporary art, and the visual language of global, popular culture as embodied by mass-produced commodities.

== Education and career ==
After graduating Sophia University, Tokyo, Matsuyama moved to New York and attended Pratt Institute in Brooklyn, where he received his MFA in Communications Design in 2004.

Matsuyama has held major exhibitions at the Azabudai Hills Gallery, Tokyo, Japan, the Reischauer Institute at Harvard University, Massachusetts, the Katzen Arts Center at American University Museum, Washington D.C., Museum of Contemporary Art Australia, Sydney, the Japan Society, New York, the Minneapolis Institute of Arts, Minneapolis, Marianne Boesky Gallery, New York, among other galleries and institutions. His works are in the permanent collections of Los Angeles County Museum of Art, Asian Art Museum of San Francisco, De Young Museum, Crystal Bridges Museum of American Art, Albertina, the Long Museum, Institute of Contemporary Art (Miami), Powerlong Art Museum, the Royal Family of Dubai, Dean Collection (Swizz Beatz and Alicia Keys), and the institutional collections of Microsoft, Toyota Motor Corporation, among others. In August 2014, Matsuyama was awarded the Harbour City Gallery Public Art Commission in Hong Kong.

From 2012 to May 2017, Matsuyama was an adjunct professor at the School of Visual Arts in NYC.

== Exhibitions ==
2026

- This is America: Selections from PAMM's Collection, Pérez Art Museum Miami, Florida
- Soft Reins: From Degas to Fordjour, Acquavella Galleries, Palm Beach, USA
- Life Imitates Art, Anthony Gallery, Chicago, USA

2025

- SIMOSE New Collection Exhibition Part 1— Tomokazu Matsuyama, Sam Falls, Simose Art Museum, Hiroshima,

Japan

- Liberation Back Home, SCAD Museum of Art, Savannah, USA
- Tomokazu Matsuyama: Morning Sun, Edward Hopper House Museum, Nyak, USA
- Tomokazu Matsuyama: FIRST LAST, Azabudai Hills Gallery, Tokyo, Japan
- Frieze Los Angeles - Official Solo Booth, Almine Rech Gallery, Los Angeles, USA

2024

- Mythologiques, 60th Venice Biennele, Hosted by the Contemporary Istanbul Foundatio, Arsenale, Venice, Italy

2023

- MATSUYAMA Tomokazu: Fictional Landscape, Shanghai Powerlong Museum, Shanghai, China
- MATSUYAMA Tomokazu: Fictional Landscape, Hirosaki Museum of Contemporary Art, Hirosaki, Japan
- Episodes Far From Home, Almine Rech Gallery, London, UK

2022

- Harmless Charm, Sotheby’s, Hong Kong
- The Best Part About Us, Kavi Gupta Gallery, Chicago, USA

2021

- Boom Bye Bye Pain, KOTARO NUKAGA, Tokyo, Japan
- Summertime, Zidoun-Bossuyt Gallery, Luxembourg
- Nature Morte, The Hole, New York, NY
- Accountable Nature, Long Museum, Chongqing, China

2020

- Accountable Nature, Long Museum, Shanghai, China

2018

- No Place Like Home, Zidoun-Bossuyt Gallery, Luxembourg City, Luxembourg
- Same Same, Different, Lumine Zero, Shinjuku, Japan

2017

- Oh Magic Night, HOCA Foundation (Hong Kong Contemporary Art), Hong Kong

2015

- Somewhere Here, Zidoun-Bossuyt Gallery, Luxembourg
- 17 Hours, Museum of Contemporary Art Australia, Sydney, Australia
- Come with me, Gallery Wendi Norri, San Francisco, CA

2014

- Sky is the Limit, Harbour City, Hong Kong
- Out Side Looking In, Lesley Kehoe Galleries, Melbourne, Australia

2013

- Palimpsest, Harvard University, Reischauer Institute, Cambridge, Boston
- The Standard Rendezvous, Zidoun Gallery, Luxembourg

2012

- New Works, Mark Moore Gallery, Los Angeles, CA
- The Future Is Always Bright, Frey Norris Gallery, San Francisco, CA
- Thousand Regards, Katzen Art Center, American University Museum, Washington DC

2011

- East Weets Mest, Joshua Liner Gallery, New York, NY

2010

- In Case You're Lost, Frey Norris Gallery, San Francisco, CA

2009

- Glancing at the Twin Peak, Joshua Liner Gallery, New York, NY

2007

- Polarize, FIFTY24SF Gallery in San Francisco, CA
- Between the Polar, Takuro Someya Contemporary Art, Kashiwa, Chica, Japan

2006

- Matzu-MTP Expo, Gallery SPEAK FOR, Tokyo, Japan
