= Xu Jiankang =

- Born: 1952 (age 73–74); Jinjiang, Fujian, China
- Citizenship: Chinese (Macau)
- Occupation: Property developer
- Title: Chairman, Powerlong
- Spouse: Married
- Children: 2

Xu Jiankang (Chinese: 许健康; born 1952), or Hoi Kin Hong in Cantonese, is a Chinese billionaire entrepreneur, and the chairman of Powerlong, a Fujian-based real estate development company.

Xu was born in 1952 in Jinjiang, Fujian, China. He moved to Macau and founded his first company in 1981. He founded Powerlong in 1990 and developed real estate in his home province Fujian.

Xu is married, with two children. He lives in Shanghai. His son Hoi Wa Fong is the CEO of Powerlong.
