= Annie Morris =

British artist based in London (born 1978)

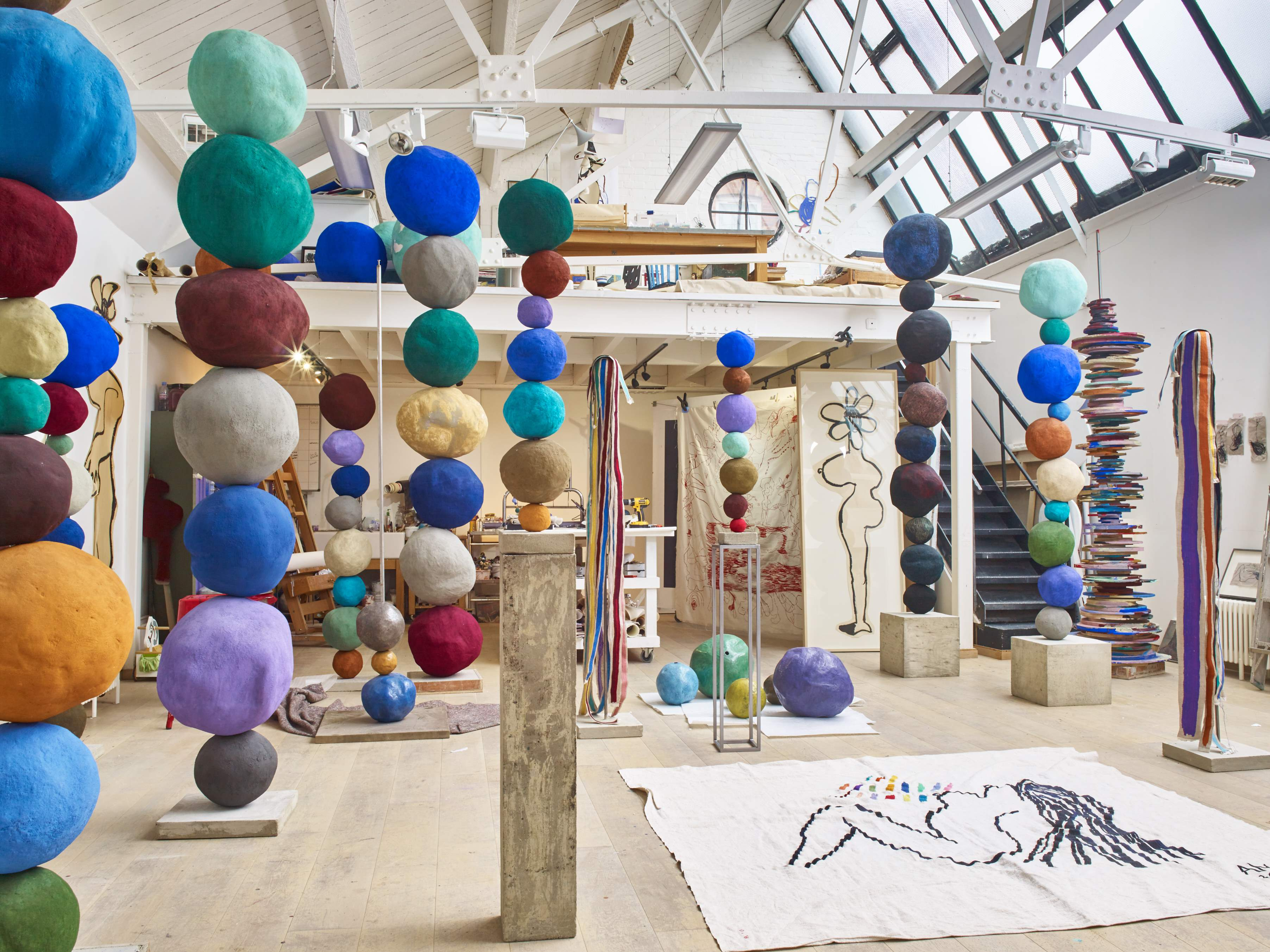
- Annie Morris studio, London, 2017
- Born: Annie Morris; January 16, 1978 (age 48); London
- Education: Saint Martin's School of Art; École des Beaux-Arts; The Slade
- Known for: Fine art, Painting, drawing, sculpture
- Spouse: Idris Khan

Annie Morris (born 1978) is a British artist based in London.

Morris’ work draws inspiration from her own life experience, using painting, drawing and sculpture. She is best known for pieces that combine obsessive drawing and ready-made sculptures.

== Life and career ==
She attended Central Saint Martin's and studied at the École nationale supérieure des Beaux-Arts, Paris, under the tutelage of sculptor Giuseppe Penone, then The Slade School of Fine Art, graduating from Camberwell College of Arts. She works from a studio in Stoke Newington she shares with her husband, the British artist Idris Khan. They have two children.

Morris’ Stack sculptures shaped from plaster, sand, and painted with raw pigment, resemble a three-dimensional artist’s palette, originally inspired by the 1988 painting- Bed with Colour by Catalan artist Antoni Tàpies. The dry, freshly painted feel of the stack’s form, is Morris’ metaphor to childbirth and fragility. She is also known for her drawings and collaborated with Sophie Dahl's first book The Man with the Dancing Eyes, 2003, published by Bloomsbury.

In 2006 Morris was commissioned by Christopher Bailey, director of fashion label Burberry, to make a dress made out of her painted clothes pegs. Morris was commissioned by American architect Peter Marino to create a work for Louis Vuitton’s flagship store opened in October 2017 at Place Vendôme, Paris.

== Selected exhibitions ==
Morris has shown work internationally, including those at:

- Timothy Taylor, New York, NY, USA, 2019
- The Royal Academy, London, Summer Exhibition, 2012
- Baku MoMA, Azerbaijan, Merging Bridges, 2012
- The New Art Gallery Walsall, England, The House of Fairytales
- Tate Gallery, St. Ives, The House of Fairytales
- The Fine Art Society, What Marcel Duchamp Taught Me
