= Keita Morimoto =

Japanese artist

- Born: January 8, 1990 (age 36); Sakai City, Osaka, Japan
- Education: Ontario College of Art and Design University
- Known for: Painting
- Website: keitamorimoto.com

Keita Morimoto (森本 啓太, Morimoto Keita; born January 8, 1990, in Sakai City, Osaka, Japan) is a Japanese contemporary painter recognized for his atmospheric cityscapes and portraits that blend classical chiaroscuro techniques with scenes of everyday urban life. His nocturnal compositions merge historical painterly methods with images of vending machines, neon-lit streets, and anonymous figures, evoking both urban isolation and quiet reverence. Morimoto studied at OCAD University in Toronto and currently lives and works in Tokyo.

== Career ==
Morimoto moved to Toronto at age sixteen and earned his Bachelor of Fine Arts from OCAD University in 2012, where he began developing his artistic practice. After graduating, he exhibited widely across Canada and the United States before returning to live and work in Japan in 2021. His work has been shown at institutions including the Museum of Contemporary Canadian Art (now MOCA Toronto), the Art Gallery of Peterborough, the 21st Century Museum of Contemporary Art, Kanazawa, K11 MUSEA in Hong Kong, and the Powerlong Art Museum in Shanghai. He has also held notable presentations at galleries such as Night Gallery (Los Angeles), Nicholas Metivier Gallery (Toronto), Almine Rech (New York), and KOTARO NUKAGA (Tokyo), consolidating his international reputation for blending classical painting techniques with contemporary urban realism.

== Work and style ==
Critics have noted Morimoto’s theatrical chiaroscuro lighting and his ability to elevate mundane urban scenes—vending machines, parking lots, or fast-food storefronts—through techniques associated with Baroque painting and early 20th-century American Realism. His practice engages historical pictorial strategies while reflecting on the structures and moral codes of present-day city life.

== Publications ==
- KEITA MORIMOTO: Illuminated Solitude (Tokyo: Bijutsu Shuppan-sha, 2024), ISBN 978-4568105834.

== Selected exhibitions ==
- 2025 — Aperto 19: what has escaped us, 21st Century Museum of Contemporary Art, Kanazawa.
- 2025 — To Nowhere and Back, Almine Rech, Tribeca, New York City.
- 2024 — Illuminated Solitude, Tsutaya Ginza via KOTARO NUKAGA, Tokyo.
- 2024 — Fading Moments, Long Story Short, Paris.
- 2023 — as we didn’t know it, Night Gallery, Los Angeles.
- 2023 — A Little Closer, KOTARO NUKAGA, Tokyo.
- 2022 — In Between Shadows, ATM Gallery, New York.
- 2022 — Contrasting Memories, Nicholas Metivier Gallery, Toronto.
- 2021 — After Dark, KOTARO NUKAGA, Tokyo.
- 2020 — Garden of Light, Nicholas Metivier Gallery, Toronto.
- 2018 — Light Passage, Nicholas Metivier Gallery, Toronto.
- 2016 — Strange Guild, Nicholas Metivier Gallery, Toronto.
- 2014 — The Nightwatchers, Museum of Contemporary Art, Toronto.

== Collections ==
Morimoto’s works are held in the following public collections:

- Shiga Museum of Art, Shiga, Japan
- High Museum of Art, Atlanta, United States
- Institute of Contemporary Art, Miami, United States
- Arts Maebashi, Gunma, Japan
- Fondazione Sandretto Re Rebaudengo, Turin, Italy
- Ueshima Museum Collection, Tokyo, Japan
