= Powerlong Art Museum =

Powerlong Art Museum is a 23,000 square meter art museum in Qibao, a township in the Minhang District of Shanghai, opened in November 2017 by Powerlong and its founder Xu Jiankang.

Shanghai Powerlong Museum (“the Museum”) is founded based on the vision, “Promote traditional Chinese culture and stimulate Chinese contemporary art”, given by Mr. Xu Jiankang, Chairman of the Powerlong Group. The Museum, established as a comprehensive one, is devoted to modern and contemporary art. Its mission is to guide the public to appreciate the art, to cultivate their aesthetic consciousness, to establish a higher spirit.

As a non-profit private museum, Shanghai Powerlong Museum focus on organizing art exhibitions, academic events, mass education activities, etc. The programs shall reveal the Museum as the best platform for cultural exchange and communication between domestic and international artists and institutions.

== Architecture ==
The Museum has a gross area of 23,000 square meter with three floors and one underground floor. The ten individual galleries size from 500 square meter to 1,100 square meter.

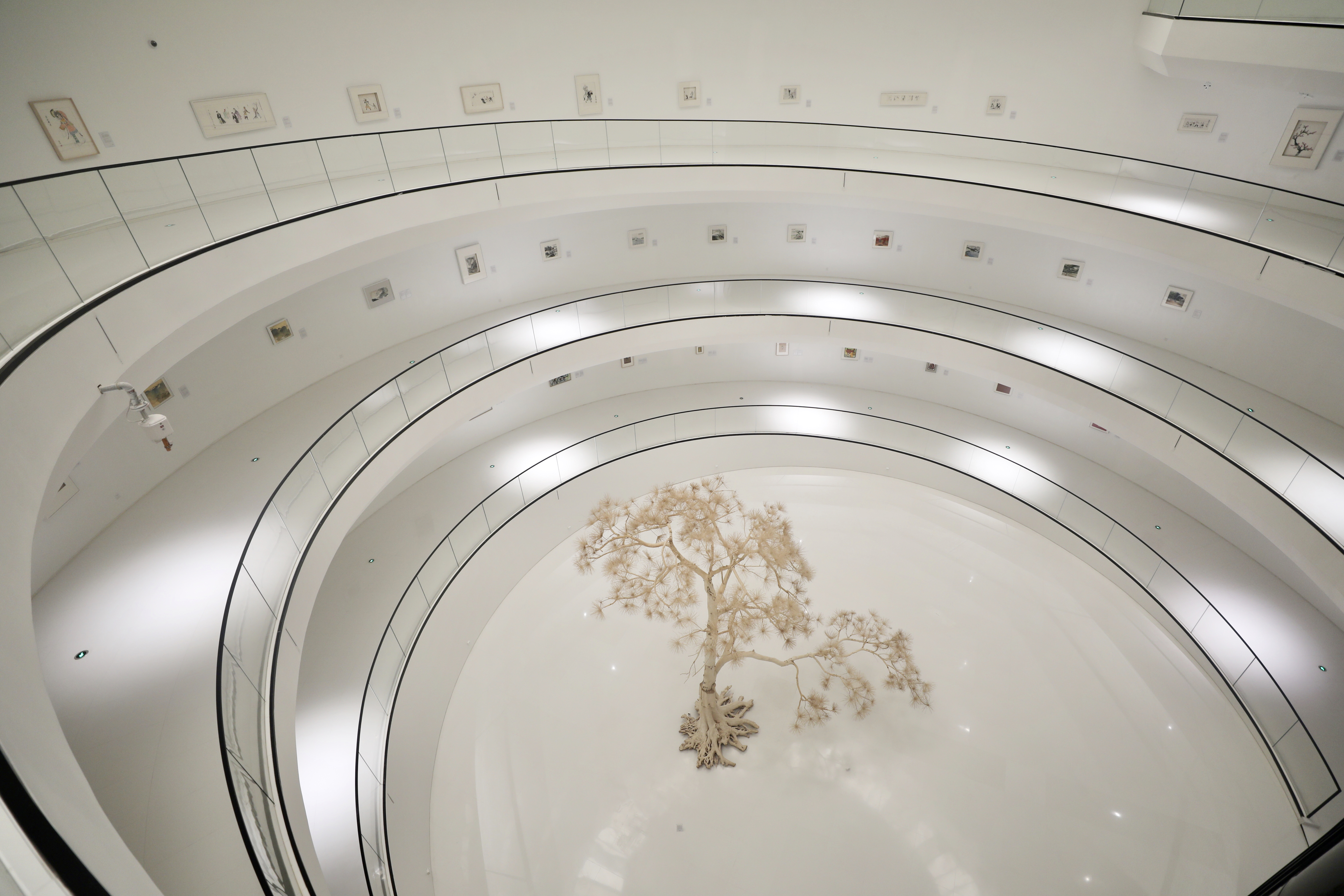
The circular passage in Hall 1, exhibiting the permanent exhibit Shucang's Collection.

Hall 1 to 3 are designed and reserved for permanent exhibition Shucang's Collection, systematically displaying personal collections of the founder Mr. Xu Jiankang. The artworks include masterpieces of both national and international artists over the past century, with different genres. The circular passage in Hall 1 connects the ground floor and the second floor, creating an immersive and innovative viewing experience for the audience.

The museum has also 4 gallery halls equipped with constant temperature and humidity air conditioning system under the international museum standard. Other hall enjoys spacious room and a ceiling height at 5 to 9 meters to better present contemporary artworks.

On the third floor, a theater serve is able to serve around two hundred audiences. The multi-functional room is located on second floor, capable of hosting distinctive salons, meetings and academic events.

== Ancillary services ==
A coffee shop and a restaurant is located respective on the ground floor and underground floor of the museum. The museum also serves a bookstore, providing books and merchandising relevant to the museum's collection and relevant temporary exhibits.
