= Stefan Brüggemann =

Mexican artist

- Born: 1975 (age 50–51); Mexico City, Mexico
- Known for: Visual Art
- Movement: Contemporary art
- Website: http://www.stefanbruggemann.com

Stefan Brüggemann (1975, Mexico City, Mexico) is a Mexican conceptual artist who works in different media such as painting, installation, video and sculpture.

== Career ==
Brüggemann has focused his career on creating text-based works that address the functions of language in society.

He has exhibited at Colección Jumex, Centre Pompidou, Kuntshalle Bern, MCA Chicago, Centro Galego de Arte Contemporánea, FRAC Dijon, Museo de Arte Carrillo Gil, ICA London, and Collection Lambert, among others.

His work can be found in public collections including Albright Knox Gallery, Buffalo, USA; Kunstmuseum Bern, Bern, Switzerland; LOWE Museum-University of Miami, Miami, USA; MACBA, Barcelona, Spain; Phoenix Art Museum, Phoenix, USA and in private collections such as La Colección Jumex, Mexico City, Mexico; The Dakis Joannou Collection, Athens, Greece; The Margulies Collection, Miami, USA or the Zuzeum Art Centre, Riga, Latvia. He is represented by Hauser & Wirth, Kotaro Nukaga, and FF Projects.

In 2022, he enlisted architect Alberto Kalach to create his studio and writers residence in Ibiza, Spain.

== Personal life ==
The artist lives and works between Mexico City, Mexico, Ibiza, Spain and London, UK.
