= Gladys Tamez =

Mexican-American milliner

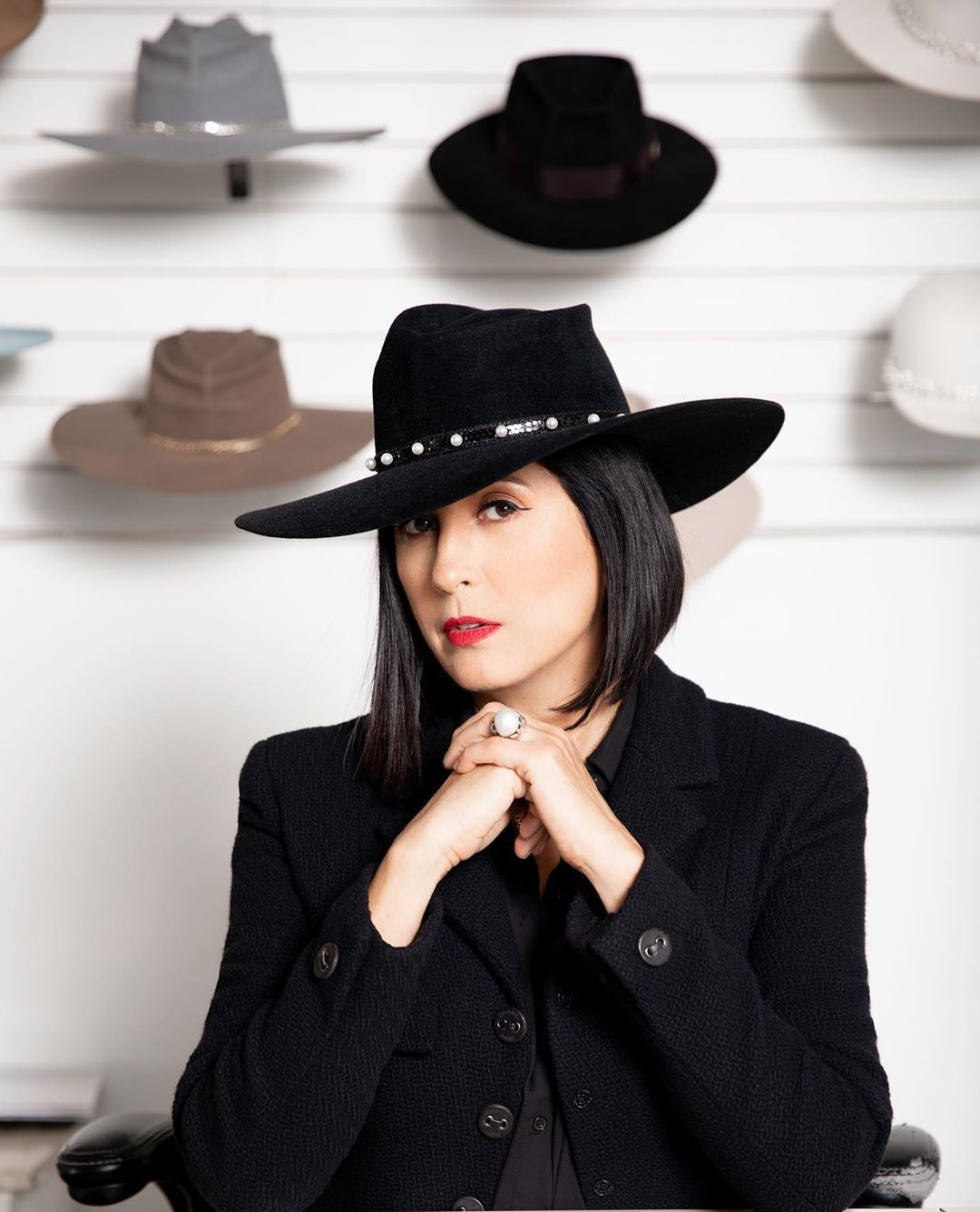
- Gladys Tamez
- Born: McAllen, Texas
- Occupation: Milliner
- Organization: Council of Fashion Designers of America
- Known for: Fashion design
- Notable work: Lady Gaga's Joanne hat, Taylor Swift's "22" fedora
- Website: gladystamez.com

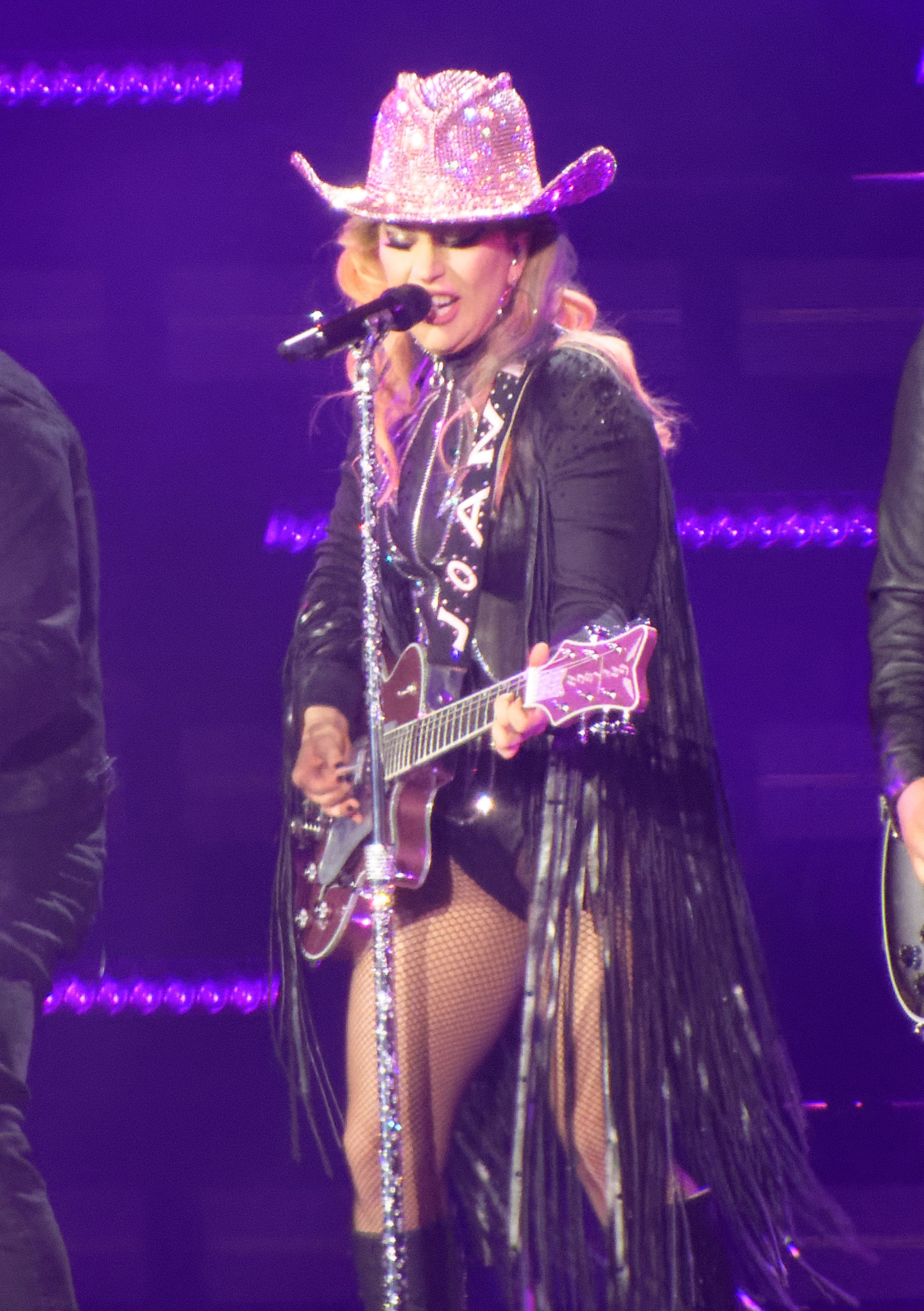
Lady Gaga in a custom Gladys Tamez Millinery bedazzled hat

Gladys Tamez (born in McAllen, Texas) is a Mexican-American haute couture milliner or hat designer. She founded her eponymously named Gladys Tamez Millinery or "GTM" in Los Angeles in 2012. Tamez is listed in Forbes magazine in 2015 as one of the most creative Mexicans in the world. Her sculptural hats have graced the covers of Assouline, and she is a member of the Council of Fashion Designers of America.

== Early life ==
Born in McAllen, Texas, Tamez was raised in Reynosa, Tamaulipas, Mexico, and Monterrey, Mexico, in a family of Taurina bullfighters. Her mother, Elizabeth Tamez, owned a local bookstore called Tivoli, and at 10, she was reading Vogue. Tamez attended art school in Florence, Italy, where her initial designs were created. While traveling in Vitoria-Gasteiz, Spain, Tamez discovered a small hat shop run by four generations of milliners that inspired her to focus on hat design.

=== Hat design inspiration ===
Her creations are inspired by a range of sources from the Studio 54 era in New York City with Bianca Jagger and Cher, the architecture of John Lautner, and Mexican film stars Dolores del Río and María Félix. In an interview with Purple, she states, "Everything is handmade. I don't have machines to make four or five at once. I still make them with woodblocks. Handmade is an old tradition that I want to keep alive." Regarding her creations, Tamez told Flaunt Magazine, “You wonder who's going to wear it. It's the fantasy of imagining the life it will have. I always say, pick the hat that goes with you and not with your clothing. You wear the hat, the hat doesn't wear you.” ¡Hola! named her in the list of the Top 100 Latina Powerhouse creatives.

== Career ==
=== Custom hats ===
==== Lady Gaga Joanne ====
Tamez is best known for her work with Lady Gaga, for whom she created the famous Joanne pink hat for the Joanne World Tour. Gaga personally called Tamez hours before the launch of her fifth studio album to share the news that Tamez's design made the album cover. Gaga also wore GTM's "Lady Bianca" and "Lady Marianne" hats, inspired by Bianca Jagger and English singer Marianne Faithfull. Tamez also spoke to Vogue about how she designed a "Gypsy Rose Lee meets Bob Mackie" Swarovski crystal hat worth one million dollars for Gaga's performance on the Victoria's Secret Fashion Show. Gaga wore Tamez's designs for performances on Saturday Night Live (accompanied by Mark Ronson, BloodPop, and Hillary Lindsey, and hosted by Tom Hanks), The Late Late Show with James Corden, The X Factor UK, Alan Carr's Happy Hour, SMAP×SMAP, and Royal Variety Performance.

==== Taylor Swift "22" Fedora ====
Tamez designed the fedora worn by Taylor Swift during the song "22" in The Eras Tour. Swift gives out the hat to a fan every night of her tour. Tamez shared with Access Hollywood that Swifties send her letters about how much they love Swift's hat.

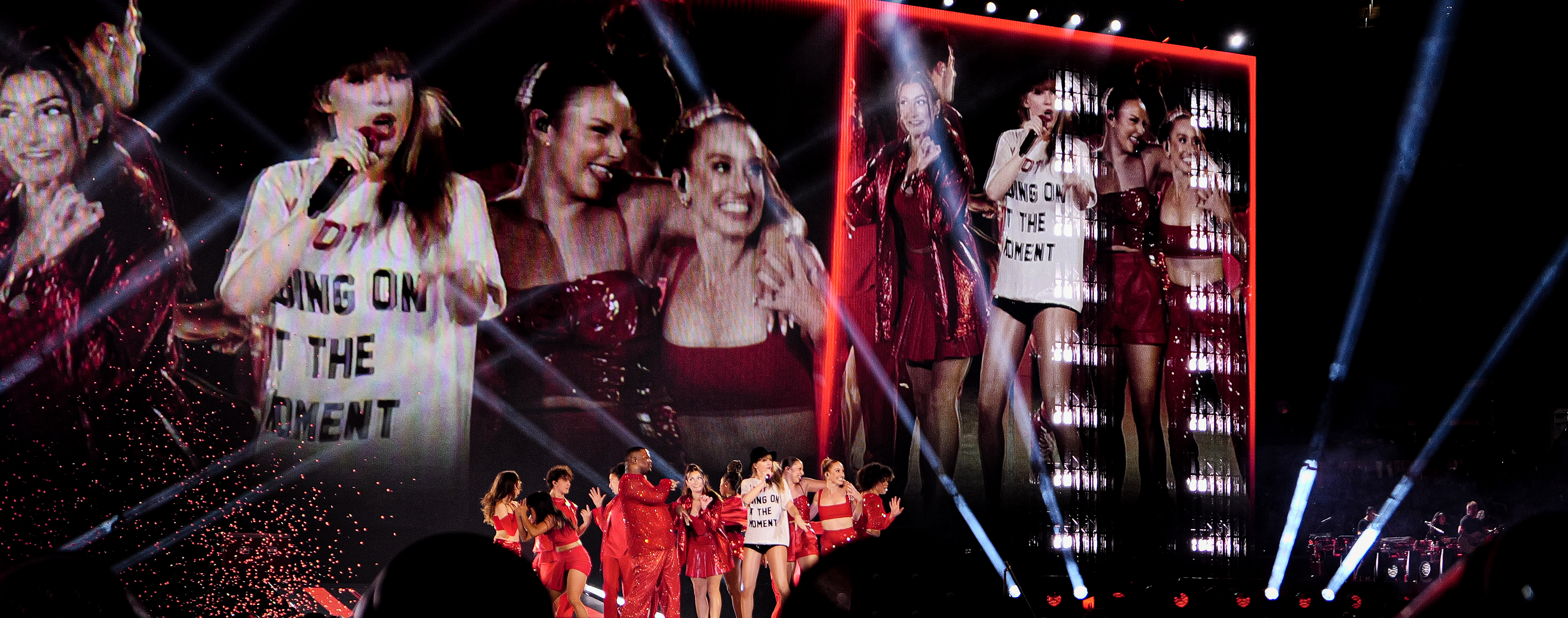
Taylor Swift in her custom Gladys Tamez "22" fedora

==== Beyoncé "Houston" ====
Beyoncé wore Tamez's "Houston" design in country music singles "16 Carriages" and "Texas Hold 'Em" released following her Verizon commercial announcement during Super Bowl LVIII. Beyoncé also used Tamez's hat designs for her Super Bowl XLVII halftime show.

==== Celebrity hats ====
Kendall Jenner has a GTM hat named and designed for her called the "Kenny", which has become a cult favorite. Rapper Future was deemed "Lord of the Brim" on the cover of GQ for his wide array of GTM hats, which he also used in his "Stick Talk" music video and throughout his album DS2. Katy Perry wore a bespoke GTM pillbox hat when meeting Pope Francis at the Vatican with her husband Orlando Bloom. Pop star Dua Lipa featured Tamez's cowboy hats prominently in her "Love Again" music video. Becky G performed with Peso Pluma at Coachella in a bespoke cowboy hat in 2023. Sia uses GTM hats as a signature over her iconic split blonde and black wigs for performances. Anahí from RBD wore a custom sparkly pink cowboy from the group's sold-out tour for her iconic "Sálvame" song. Shakira wore Tamez's custom designs in her music video for "El Jefe" with Fuerza Regida.

Gladys Tamez Millinery's flagship bespoke atelier is located in downtown Los Angeles in the Arts District, where Kendall Jenner and Gigi Hadid are known to frequent.

=== Notable clients ===
Tamez is also associated with celebrities including Madonna, Shakira, Johnny Depp, Jay-Z, David Bowie, Kim Kardashian, Alicia Keys, Cher, Janet Jackson, Salma Hayek, Jennifer Lopez, Cindy Crawford, Travis Barker, Jane Fonda, Demi Lovato, Future, Lil Nas X, Ariana Grande, Sia, Kylie Jenner, Kourtney Kardashian, Khloé Kardashian, Erin Wasson, Kate Upton, DeAndre Jordan, Joe Perry, Neil Young, Beck, Emily Ratajkowski, Nicole Trunfio, Queen Latifah, Neil Young, Hailey Bieber, Nathalie Kelley, LeBron James, Vanessa Hudgens, Kelly Wearstler, Blue Ivy Carter, Rosalía, Maluma, Ringo Starr, Beck, Megan Thee Stallion, and Cardi B.

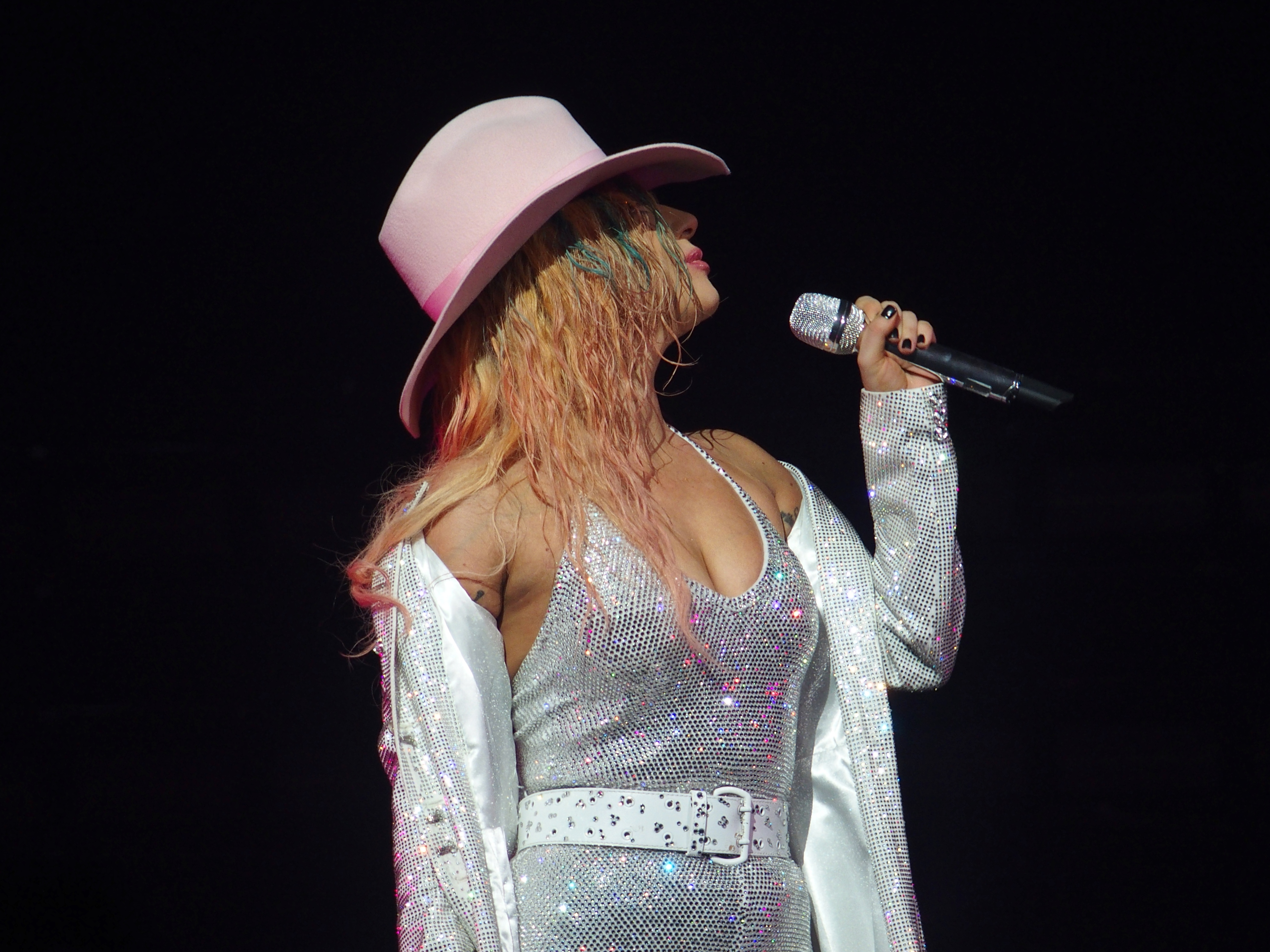
Lady Gaga in her signature rose Gladys Tamez Joanne hat

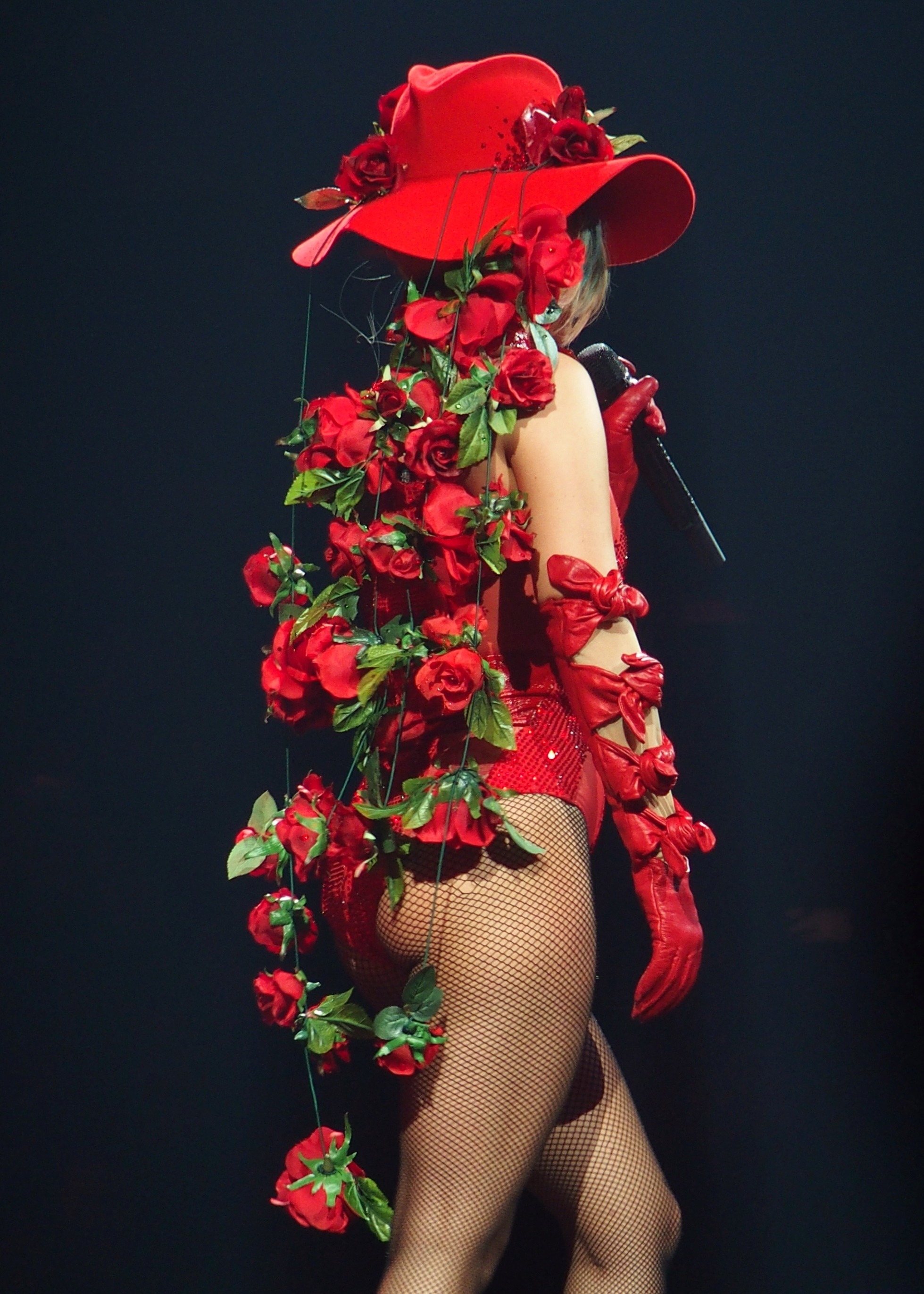
Lady Gaga in a custom "Lady Bianca" hat by Gladys Tamez

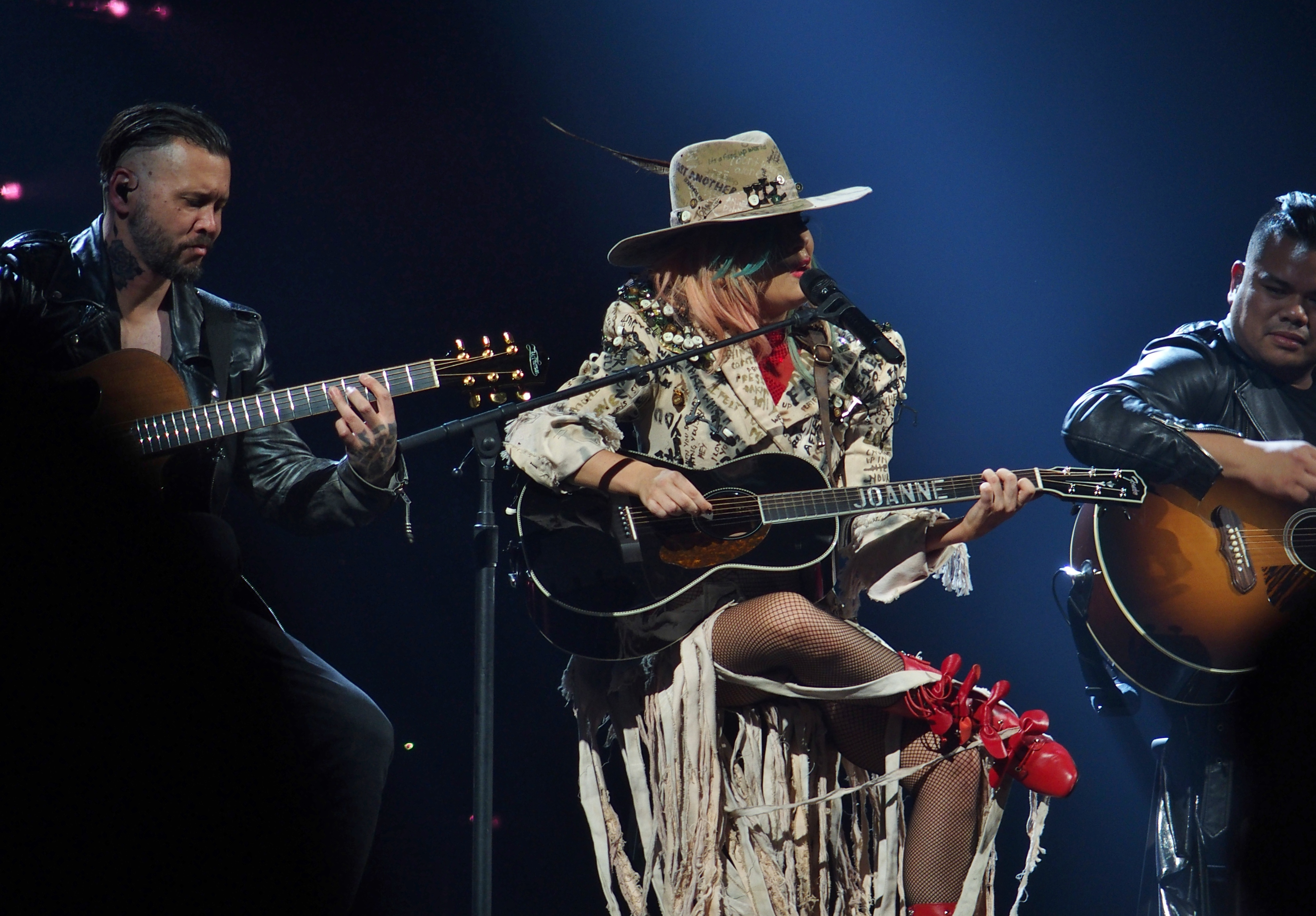
Lady Gaga in a "Lady Marianne" hat Gladys Tamez design

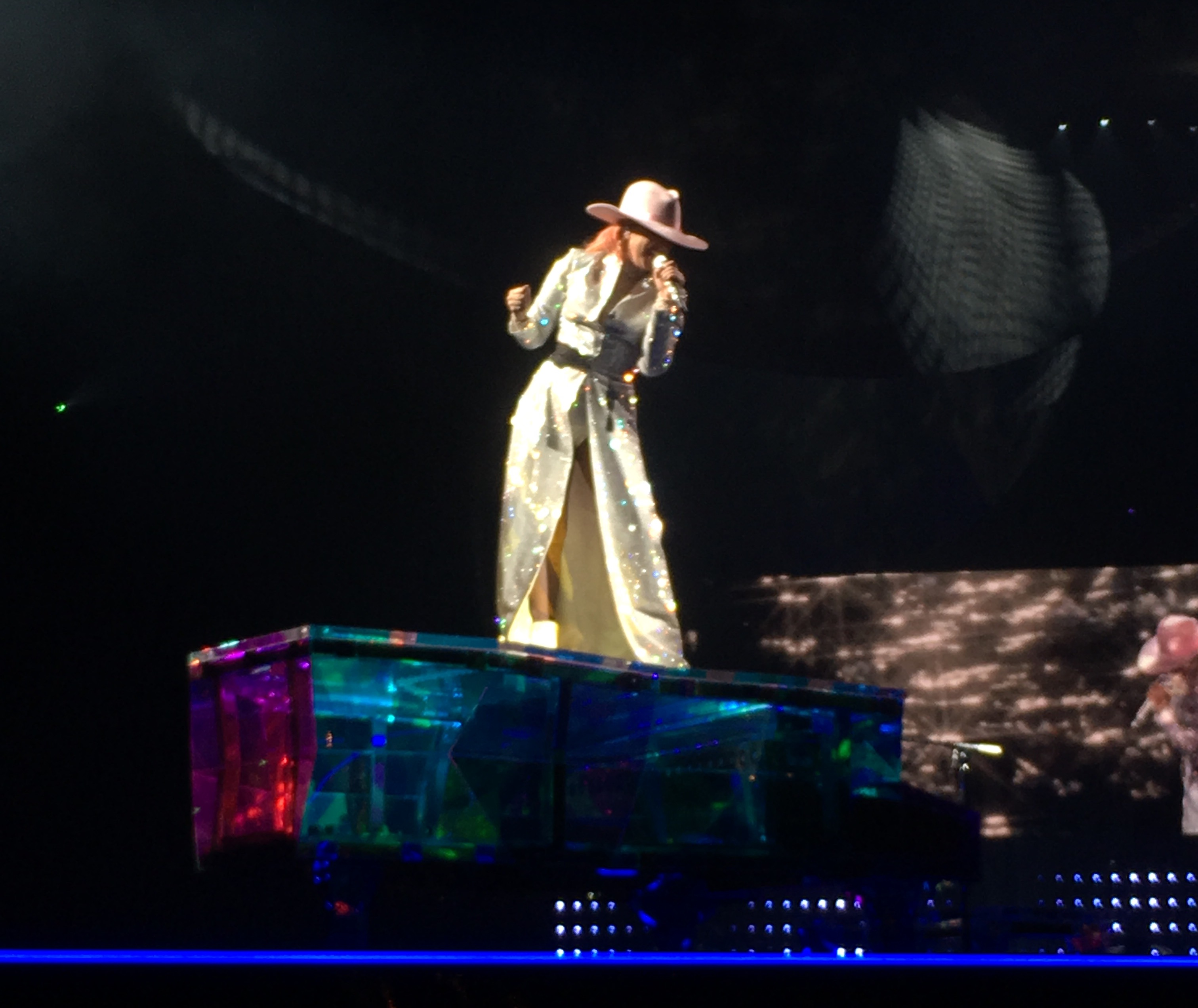
Lady Gaga on her Joanne World Tour wearing a Gladys Tamez design

== Personal life ==
Tamez resides in Los Angeles.
