= Tony Matelli =

American sculptor (born 1971)

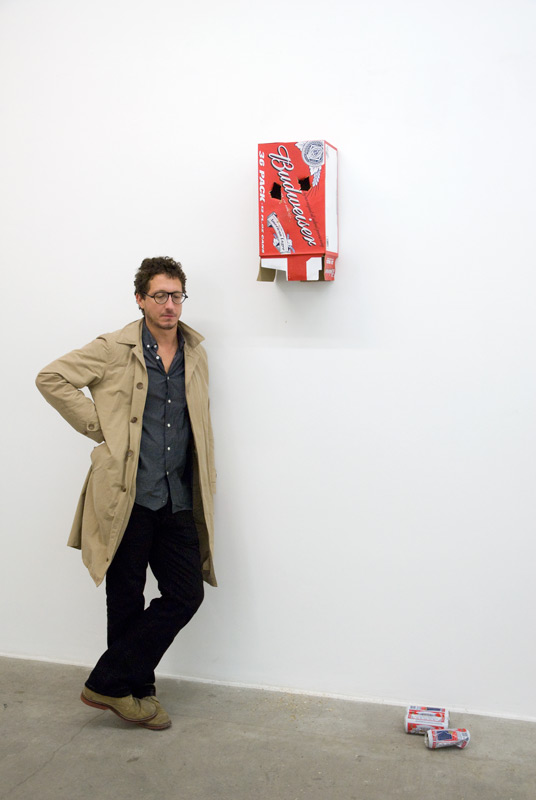
- Born: 1971 (age 54–55); Chicago, Illinois, US
- Education: Milwaukee Institute of Art & Design (BFA, 1993); Cranbrook Academy of Art (MFA, 1995)

Tony Matelli (born 1971) is an American sculptor, who has gained recognition for his hyper-realistic artworks, which utilize various techniques and materials. One of his best known works is Sleepwalker.

Born in Chicago, Matelli received his BFA from the Milwaukee Institute of Art & Design in 1993 and his MFA from the Cranbrook Academy of Art in 1995. Lives and works in New York City.

In 2017 Matelli created the sculpture "Hera" for and exhibited the work at the Aldrich Museum of Contemporary Art in Ridgefield, Connecticut as part of their "Main Street Sculpture" series.

Incorporating figurative, botanical, and abstract forms in his sculpture, Tony Matelli creates uncanny objects that are both unsettling and comical. His bronze sculptures feature ropes frozen in mid-air, as if the ropes were dropped on a plinth and cast just before collapsing into inert coils. Other works rely on unusual juxtapositions, such as his weeds series in which plants sprout from the space between gallery walls and floors. By defying gravity and manipulating optics, Matelli offers viewers a renewed perspective on familiar objects and appearances, transforming reality into something novel. Each of Matelli’s artworks carries a provocative element, serving as a protest against established norms and conventions. Across his oeuvre, and particularly in his mirror paintings, Matelli discards traditional genre categories in favor of experiential concerns. “I like sculpture because it’s unwieldy, and there is a resistance to decoration in sculpture that I like,” Matelli has said. “Genres are at the service of ideas, not the other way around.” Described as anti-monuments, his sculptures redefine the tradition of American hyperrealism, exploring themes of loneliness, vulnerability, resilience, and resistance against adverse circumstances.

== Education ==
1995 M.F.A., Cranbrook Academy of Art, Michigan
1993 B.F.A., Milwaukee Institute of Art & Design, Wisconsin
1991 Alliance of Independent Colleges of Art-Independent Study, New York

== Sleepwalker ==
Most of the sculptor's notoriety has arisen from his work Sleepwalker and the placement of the work therein. First publicly installed outside Wellesley College - an all women's school - the sculpture came under attack both in words and deed. The work was created for display in time with his solo exhibition at Wellesley's Davis Museum, titled "New Gravity”. Some students reaction to the work was similar to that of Anthony Gormley's figure placed near a ledge on the Empire State Building being called in to emergency services as a jumper; they thought it was a stumbling invasive drunk or otherwise a perpetrator. A petition was then started demanding removal of the work and, as reported by The New York Times, garnered over five hundred signatures, with the organizers stating that it had become “a source of apprehension, fear, and triggering thoughts regarding sexual assault for some members of our campus community.” Matelli responded stating.."If you have bad feelings toward this and it’s triggering you, you need to seek sympathy, you need to seek help....”. In 2014 the sculpture was vandalized by spraying yellow paint on it. In the end the sculpture stayed for the course of the exhibition and the debate continued online, ending in over one thousand signatures asking for the work's removal on change.org.

Media coverage of the Sleepwalker at Wellesley started via a local blog, The Swellesley Report, got picked up in Boston media, and then was communicated via wire services. Over several waves of the developing controversy, over 5000 articles in over 96 countries in multiple languages were identified. The media reaction was unanticipated by the artist, the media relations officer, and the museum.

During the spring and summer of 2016 the sculpture was exhibited along New York City's Highline Park with continued debate and the great interest of onlookers.

== Solo exhibitions ==
2023 Sleepwalker, Frieze Sculpture 2023, London, UK
2023 Timelines, Maruani Mercier Gallery, Belgium (cat.)
2023 Displacement Map, Andrehn-Schiptjenko, Paris, France
2022 Arrangements, Nino Mier Gallery, LA
2021 The Armory, Maruani Mercier Gallery, NY
2020 Abandon. Andréhn-Schiptjenko, Paris, France
2019 Andréhn-Schiptjenko, Stockholm, Sweden
2018 Lapses. Pilevneli Gallery, Istanbul, Turkey
2018 Real Estate Fine Art, Brooklyn, NY
2018 I Hope All Is Well.... 500 Capp Street, San Francisco, CA
2017 Past-Life. Marlborough Contemporary, London, United Kingdom
2017 Garden. The Aldrich Contemporary Art Museum, Ridgefield, CT (cat.)
2016 Realisms. The State Hermitage Museum, St. Petersburg, Russia (cat.)
2015 Garden. Marlborough Chelsea, New York, New York
2015 Garden. Marlborough Chelsea, Broome St, New York, New York
2014 Tony Matelli, Olaf Bruening, John Miller. Gary Tatintsian Gallery Inc., Moscow, Russia (cat.)
2014 Tony Matelli: New Gravity. The Davis Museum, Wellesley College, Massachusetts (cat.)
2013 Stephane Simoens Contemporary, Knokke, Belgium
2013 White Flag Projects, Saint Louis, Missouri (cat.)
2013 Tony Matelli – A HUMAN ECHO. Bergen Kunstmuseum, Bergen, Norway (cat.)
2013 Windows, Walls and Mirrors. Green Gallery, Milwaukee, Wisconsin
2012 Echoes. Andréhn-Schiptjenko, Stockholm, Sweden
2012 Tony Matelli - A HUMAN ECHO. ARoS Aarhus Kunstmuseum, Aarhus, Denmark (cat.)
2012 Windows, Walls and Mirrors. Leo Koenig Inc, New York, New York
2011 Falkenrot Prize 2011: Tony Matelli: Glass of Water. Kunstlerhaus Bethanien, Berlin (cat.)
2011 Glass of Water. Selestat Bienniale, Selestat, France
2010 The Constant Now. Andrehn-Schiptjenko, Stockholm Sweden
2010 Tony Matelli: Mirror Paintings. Andrehn-Schiptjenko, Stockholm
2010 Mise en Abyme. Stephane Simoens Contemporary, Knokke, Belgium
2009 Yesterday. Green Gallery, Milwaukee, Wisconsin
2009 The Idiot. Gary Tatintsian Gallery, Moscow, Russia
2009 Life and Times. Galerie Charlotte Moser, Geneva, Switzerland
2009 Abandon. Palais de Tokyo, Paris, France
2008 Survival. Gary Tatintsian Gallery, Moscow, Russia (cat.)
2008 Survival. Uppsala Kunstmuseum, Uppsala, Sweden (cat.)
2008 The Old Me. Leo Koenig Inc, New York, New York
2008 Self Portraits, with Phillip Akkerman. Stephane Simoens, Knokke, Belgium
2007 New Works. Leo Koenig Inc, New York, New York
2006 Andrehn-Schiptjenko, Stockholm, Sweden
2006 Charlotte Moser Gallery, Geneva, Switzerland
2005 Emmanuel Perrotin Gallery, Paris, France
2005 Abandon. Centre d’Arte Santa Monica, Barcelona, Spain
2004 Abandon. Kunsthalle Wien, Vienna, Austria (cat.)
2004 Fucked and The Oracle. Kunstraum Dornbirn, Dornbirn, Austria (cat.)
2003 Andrehn-Schiptjenko, Stockholm, Sweden
2003 Sies & Hoeke Gallery, Dusseldorf, Germany
2002 Emmanuel Perrotin Gallery, Paris, France
2002 Gian Enzo Sperone, Rome
2002 Sperone Jr., Rome, Italy
2002 Bailey Fine Art, Toronto
2001 Leo Koenig Inc., New York, NY
2001 Art Dealers Invitational, Marseilles, France
2000 Sies+ Hoeke Gallery, Dusseldorf, Germany
2000 Ten in One Gallery, New York, NY
2000 Torch Gallery, Amsterdam, Holland
2000 Gallery du Triangle, Bordeaux, France
1999 Abandon. University of Buffalo Art Gallery, New York, NY (cat.)
1999 Andrehn Schiptjenko, Stockholm, Sweden
1999 Basilico Fine Arts, New York, NY
1997 Basilico Fine Arts, New York, NY
1997 Ten in One Gallery, Chicago, IL

== Fellowships ==
1999 New York Foundation for the Arts, Fellowship in Sculpture

== Public collections ==
ARoS Aarhus Kunstmuseum, Aarhus, Denmark
ARKEN Museum of Modern Art, Ishøj, Denmark
Akzo Nobel Art Foundation
Bergen Kunstmuseum, Bergen, Norway
Bonnier Collection, Stockholm, Sweden
CCA Andratx, Majorca, Spain
Cranbrook Art Museum, Cranbrook, MI
CURIOUSLY STRONG Altoids Collection, (New Museum) New York, NY
The Cultural Foundation Ekaterina, Moscow, Russia
The Davis Museum, Wellesley, MA
FLAG Art Foundation, New York, NY
Fundacion La Caixa Madrid, Spain
FRAC Bordeaux, France
Magasin 3 Stockholm Konsthall, Stockholm, Sweden
MIT List Visual Arts Center, Cambridge, MA
Mudam Luxembourg, Luxembourg
Musee d’arte Contemporain Montreal, Canada
Museum Ludwig, Cologne, Germany
Museum of New Zealand Te Papa Tongarewa, Wellington, New Zealand
Museum Voorlinden, Wassenaar, Netherlands
Philbrook Museum of Art, Tulsa, OK
National Centre for Contemporary Arts, Moscow, Russia
Skive New Art Museum SNYK, Copenhagen, Denmark
Sundsvalls Kommun, Sundsvall, Sweden
Uppsala Konstmusuem, Uppsala, Sweden
