= Jorge Méndez Blake =

Mexican artist

Jorge Méndez Blake (born 1974) is a Mexican mixed-media conceptual artist. Trained as an architect, the artist builds walls and connects their history to literature. He lives and works in Guadalajara, Mexico.

At the James Cohan Gallery in New York, he exhibited a wall entitled Amerika, based on a Franz Kafka novel, during the time of the government shutdown when president Donald Trump was advocating to build the wall between the U.S. Mexican border. In this sense, his work could be seen as border art.

His work focuses on writing as "a kind of construction," using his brick sculptures to connect architecture to literature. He has exhibited widely in international bienniales and museums.
