= Jose Dávila =

Mexican contemporary artist

- Born: 1974 (age 50–51); Guadalajara, Mexico
- Education: ITESO, Universidad Jesuita de Guadalajara
- Known for: Sculpture

Jose Dávila (born 1974 in Guadalajara, Mexico) is a Mexican multidisciplinary artist. Mainly a sculptor, Dávila also works with two-dimensional media such as painting, drawing and prints. His work encompasses different topics and concepts such as the tradition of modernism in the arts, notions of balance and equilibrium manifested through sculptural creation and the politics of representation and recognition within visual cultures. Dávila currently lives and works in Guadalajara, Mexico.

== Education ==
Jose Dávila studied architecture in the 1990s at the Instituto Tecnológico de Estudios Superiores de Occidente in Guadalajara, Mexico. In different interviews the artist has valued this initial education however he prefers to consider himself a self-taught artist, involving an intuitive research of art history and different influential artists such as Donald Judd, Sol LeWitt, Roy Lichtenstein and Jannis Kounnellis.

== Career ==
Jose Dávila belongs to a prolific generation of artists from Jalisco, including other names such as Jorge Méndez Blake and Gonzalo Lebrija. The creation of the first international art fair in Mexico, called Expo Arte and presented in Guadalajara during the nineties represented the triggering event that turned this local artistic scene into an internationally-driven and vibrant community. He also co-funded and co-directed the independent art space "OPA" or "Oficina para Proyectos de Arte" (Office for Art Projects) which became an influential space for presenting the work of cutting-edge international contemporary artists in Guadalajara. Artists like Pipilotti Rist, Anri Sala, Yutaka Sone and Mario García Torres exhibited in this space which was located in the top floor of Condominios Guadalajara, a tower built in the 1950's and that for many years stood as the only high-rise structure in the city.

== Artwork ==
=== Cut-outs ===
During his early career Dávila investigated the conceptual usage of images within the art context, manipulating them in different ways. During these years he started his series of "cut-out" works which runs until recent years. The series consists of different groups of images in which the main subject is removed by cutting it out, leaving only the surroundings. Dávila approached topics such as architecture, art history, popular culture and the work of specific artists like Pablo Picasso, Roy Lichtenstein, Dan Flavin and Richard Prince. By presenting incomplete versions of highly familiar images Dávila invites the public to question the inherent dynamics of visual recognition and how this plays a vital role in the establishment of visually-oriented cultures.

=== Donald Judd series ===
Dávila has replicated the iconic "Stack" sculptures by American minimalist artist Donald Judd using simple repurposed materials such as cardboard and recycled shipping containers. These works are in between appropriation, homage and re-contextualization, but more than wanting to reflect on originality and authenticity, Dávila seeks to question the nature of the sculptural object. In an interview Dávila mentions how Judd's stacks function by occupying space and establishing "spatial relationships", and that this could be re-enacted with cheaper and local materials.

=== Sculpture ===
In recent years Dávila has developed more projects related to sculpture. He creates complex structural systems in which stones, construction materials and found objects remain in perilous balance, often balancing the weight of the elements in order to create a stable composition through the use of ratchet straps or wires. His larger on-site installations often involve site-specific materials. As a research topic he has also focused on the material and cultural histories of stone and its relationship with the human world.

=== Public art projects ===
==== Sense of Place (Los Angeles, 2017) ====
In 2017 LAND (Los Angeles Nomadic Division) commissioned Jose Dávila the creation of a sculptural project that would interact in close proximity with the city of Los Angeles and its inhabitants. The result was a large-scale modular sculpture that moved through different landmark sites and neighborhoods of Los Angeles. The sculpture consisted of a 2.5 meter high cube made with 40 individual pieces made with concrete. The work was initially presented in its complete form at West Hollywood Park and then the different modules were disseminated across the city. The nature of the work was relational and interactive with the public, the previously blank surface of the concrete pieces ended up covered with graffiti and other interventions. After three months the pieces were brought together and the assembled cube was presented with all its modifications for one last time at West Hollywood Park.

== List of selected exhibitions ==
=== Solo exhibitions ===
- Nichido Contemporary Art, Minato, Japan (2024)
- Centro Internazionale di Scultura, Peccia, Switzerland (2020)
- Dallas Contemporary, Dallas (2020)
- Museo Amparo, Puebla, Mexico (2019)
- Museo Universitario del Chopo, Mexico City (2019)
- Franz Josefs Kai, Vienna (2018)
- Sammlung Philara, Düsseldorf (2018)
- Blueproject Foundation, Barcelona (2017)
- Hamburger Kunsthalle, Hamburg (2017)
- SCAD Museum of Art, Savannah, US (2016)
- Jumex Museum, Mexico City (2016)
- Marfa Contemporary, Marfa (2016)

=== Group exhibitions and biennales ===
- Museum Voorlinden, Wassenaar, Netherlands (2020, 2016)
- 22nd Biennale of Sydney (2020)
- Gropius Bau, Berlin (2019)
- Museum Haus Konstruktiv, Zürich (2019)
- 13 Bienal de La Habana (2019)
- YUZ Museum, Shanghai (2018)
- KANAL Centre Pompidou, Brussels (2018)
- Museo de Arte Contemporáneo de Buenos Aires, Buenos Aires (2018)
- Museum of Modern Art, Gunma, Japan (2017)
- Centre Pompidou, Paris (2016)
- Museo Tamayo, Mexico City (2014)
- Museu do Arte Moderna, Sao Paulo (2009)
- Prague Biennale 2 (2003)
- Puerto Rico Biennale 02 (2002)

== Collections ==
Artworks by Jose Dávila can be found in the following public and private collections:

- Solomon R. Guggenheim Museum, New York
- Centre Pompidou, Paris
- Museo Nacional Centro de Arte Reina Sofía, Madrid
- Thyssen-Bornemisza Art Contemporary, Vienna
- Marciano Art Foundation, Los Angeles
- Museo Universitario de Arte Contemporáneo, Mexico City
- Inhotim Collection, Brumadinho

== Prizes and awards ==
- BALTIC Centre for Contemporary Art's Annual Artist Award (2017)
- EFG ArtNexus Latin American Art Award (2014)
