= 2018 Chicago Cubs season =

2018 Chicago Cubs
- National League Wild Card winners
- League: National League
- Division: Central
- Ballpark: Wrigley Field
- City: Chicago
- Record: 95-68 (.583)
- Divisional place: 2nd
- Owners: Tom Ricketts
- President of baseball operations: Theo Epstein
- General managers: Jed Hoyer
- Managers: Joe Maddon
- Television: WGN-TV; NBC Sports Chicago; NBC Sports Chicago Plus; WLS-TV (Len Kasper, Jim Deshaies)
- Radio: WSCR (AM); Chicago Cubs Radio Network (Pat Hughes, Ron Coomer, Zach Zaidman)
- Stats: ESPN.com; Baseball Reference

The 2018 Chicago Cubs season was the 147th season of the Chicago Cubs franchise, the 143rd in the National League and the Cubs' 103rd season at Wrigley Field. The Cubs were managed by Joe Maddon, in his fourth year as Cubs manager, and played their home games at Wrigley Field as members of Major League Baseball's National League Central.

The Cubs began the season March 29 at the Miami Marlins and finished the season on September 30 against the St. Louis Cardinals. On September 26, the Cubs clinched a trip to the postseason for the fourth year in a row, marking the longest streak in franchise history. The Cubs finished the 162-game schedule 95–67, earning a tie with the Milwaukee Brewers for the division and the best record in the National League. They lost to the Brewers in a 163rd game to determine the Central Division champions, failing in their quest to win the division for a third consecutive year. Instead, they hosted the NLWC Game against the Colorado Rockies, but the Cubs lost 2–1 in 13 innings.

== Previous season ==
The Cubs finished the 2017 season 92–70 in first place in the Central Division, winning the division title for the second consecutive year. The Cubs defeated the Washington Nationals in the National League Division Series three games to two to advance to face the Los Angeles Dodgers in the League Championship Series in a rematch of the previous year's series. In the best of seven NLCS, the Cubs lost to the Dodgers four games to one.

== Television broadcasts ==
The 2018 season was the second of the last for team broadcasts on long time FTA broadcaster WGN-TV, the 2018-19 offseason was when it was announced that effective Opening Day 2020, the Cubs will be moving to a brand new regional cable TV channel, making them the 4th team overall to have their own cable station, officially ending a 7-decade long presence there. WLS-TV, the team's secondary over the air broadcaster, will soon take over the free to air broadcasts of Cubs games from that year on.

== Offseason ==
=== Wrigley Field renovations ===
The fourth phase of the 1060 Project off-season improvements began after the end of the 2017 season. Construction was started under the seats behind home plate on the first of four premier luxury clubs to be located around the park. The players dugouts have been relocated further down the left and right field foul lines to accommodate two of the four new clubs. The final club, located in the upper level, is planned for the 2019 season. The Hotel Zachary, just across Clark Street, celebrated its opening along with the Cubs' home opener against the Pittsburgh Pirates on April 9, 2018.

=== Transactions ===
==== October 2017 ====
October 23	Assistant hitting coach Eric Hinske signed with the Los Angeles Angels to be their hitting coach.
October 26	Did not renew the contracts of pitching coach Chris Bosio, hitting coach John Mallee, and third base coach Gary Jones
October 26	Named Chili Davis as hitting coach and Brian Butterfield as third base coach and promoted Andy Haines to assistant hitting coach
October 26	Claimed OF Jacob Hannemann off waivers from Seattle. Designated SS Mike Freeman for assignment
October 30	Bench coach Dave Martinez was named manager of Washington.

==== November 2017 ====
November 2	Jake Arrieta, Alex Avila, Wade Davis, Brian Duensing, Jon Jay, John Lackey, Rene Rivera and Koji Uehara elected free agency.
November 3	Assigned SS Mike Freeman outright to Iowa (PCL). Claimed LHP Randy Rosario off waivers from Minnesota.
November 6	Claimed RHP Cory Mazzoni off waivers from San Diego. Selected the contract of RHP Matt Carasiti from Iowa (PCL). Assigned OF Leonys Martin outright to Iowa (PCL).
November 21	Named Jim Hickey pitching coach, Will Venable first base coach and Jim Benedict special assistant to baseball operations. Promoted first base coach Brandon Hyde to bench coach.
November 21	Selected the contracts of RHP Adbert Alzolay and INF David Bote from Tennessee (SL) and RHP Oscar De La Cruz from Myrtle Beach (Carolina). Announced OF Jacob Hannemann cleared waivers and assigned outright to Iowa (PCL).

==== December 2017 ====
December 1	RHP Héctor Rondón elected free agency.
December 1	C Taylor Davis elected free agency.
December 7	Signed free agent RHP Tyler Chatwood to a three-year, $38 million contract.
December 12	Signed free agent RHP Brandon Morrow to a two-year $21 million contract.
December 12	Signed free agent LHP Drew Smyly to a two-year $10 million contract.
December 16	Signed free agent RHP Steve Cishek to a two-year, $13 million contract.

==== January 2018 ====
January 12	Signed 3B Kris Bryant to a one-year, $10.85 million contract to avoid arbitration.
January 12	Signed SS Addison Russell to a one-year, $3.2 million contract to avoid arbitration.
January 12	Signed RHP Kyle Hendricks to a one-year, $4.175 million contract to avoid arbitration.
January 12	Signed LHP Justin Wilson to a one-year, $4.25 million contract to avoid arbitration.
January 12	Signed IF Tommy La Stella to a one-year, $950,000 contract to avoid arbitration.
January 17	Signed LHP Brian Duensing to a two-year, $7 million contract.

==== February 2018 ====
February 10	Signed RHP Yu Darvish to a six-year $126 million contract.
February 15	Signed free agent OF Kevin Moreno to a minor league contract.
February 16	Signed RHP Shae Simmons to a major league split contract. Placed LHP Drew Smyly on 60-day disabled list. Signed free agent RHP Raidel Orta to a minor league contract.
February 17	Signed free agent OF Josue Fernandez to a minor league contract. Signed free agent LHP Johan Lopez to a minor league contract.
February 19	Signed free agent OF Peter Bourjos to a minor league contract and invited him to spring training.
February 23	Invited non-roster OF Charcer Burks to spring training. RHP Brad Markey assigned to Chicago Cubs. OF D.J. Wilson, IF Stephen Bruno, C Cael Brockmeyer, RHP James Norwood, RHP Zach Hedges, RHP Duary Torrez, OF Wynton Bernard, and RHP James Pugliese assigned to Chicago Cubs. Released RHP Williams Perez.
February 25	RHP Stephen Perakslis, C P. J. Higgins, 2B Vimael Machín, RHP Casey Bloomquist, 1B Yasiel Balaguert, and C Erick Castillo assigned to Chicago Cubs.
February 26	LHP Ryan Kellogg assigned to Chicago Cubs.
February 27	RF Jeffrey Baez and RHP Preston Morrison assigned to Chicago Cubs.

==== March 2018 ====
March 4	1B Gioskar Amaya assigned to Chicago Cubs.
March 8	2B Trent Giambrone assigned to Chicago Cubs.
March 9	SS Zack Short, 3B Jesse Hodges, SS Carlos Penalver, and C Tyler Pearson assigned to Chicago Cubs. Optioned Adbert Alzolay, Duane Underwood Jr., and Oscar De La Cruz to Tennessee Smokies.
March 10	IF Austin Upshaw, OF Eddy Martinez, RHP Jake Stinnett, OF Chris Pieters, IF Andruw Monasterio, and CF Trey Martin assigned to Chicago Cubs.
March 13	LF Kevonte Mitchell, RF Daniel Spingola, LF Roberto Caro, 3B Kevin Cornelius, C Tyler Alamo, and C Gustavo Polanco assigned to Chicago Cubs. Optioned RHP Jen-Ho Tseng, RHP Alec Mills, RHP Luke Farrell, LHP Darío Álvarez, 2B David Bote, RHP Cory Mazzoni, and LHP Rob Zastryzny to Iowa Cubs.
March 15	Released RHP Justin Grimm. OF Jonathan Sierra and SS Rafael Narea assigned to Chicago Cubs.
March 16	LHP Jordan Minch, RHP Scott Effross, and LHP Tommy Thorpe assigned to Chicago Cubs. Optioned OF Mark Zagunis and RHP Dillon Maples to Iowa Cubs.
March 17	SS Luis Vazquez assigned to Chicago Cubs.
March 18	CF Fernando Kelli, RHP David Berg, RHP Mario Meza, and C Jhonny Pereda assigned to Chicago Cubs.
March 19	C Henderson Perez and C Jonathan Soto assigned to Chicago Cubs.
March 21	LHP Wyatt Short assigned to Chicago Cubs. Seattle Mariners claimed LHP Darío Álvarez off waivers from Chicago Cubs.
March 22	RHP Jose Rosario and RHP Tommy Nance assigned to Chicago Cubs.
March 23	RHP Chad Hockin assigned to Chicago Cubs. Optioned LHP Randy Rosario to Iowa Cubs. Released OF Peter Bourjos.
March 24	C Tyler Payne assigned to Chicago Cubs. Announced C Victor Caratini will make opening day roster.
March 27	Los Angeles Dodgers claimed RHP Cory Mazzoni off waivers from Chicago Cubs.
March 28	Optioned RHP Shae Simmons to Iowa Cubs.

== Regular season ==
=== Game log ===
2018 regular season game log: 95–68 (Home: 51–31; Away: 44–37)
March: 2–1 (Home: 0–0; Away: 2–1)

#	Date	Opponent	Score	Win	Loss	Save	Attendance	Record	Box/ Streak
1	March 29	@ Marlins	8–4	**Cishek** (1–0)	Ureña (0–1)	—	32,151	1–0	W1
2	March 30	@ Marlins	1–2 (17)	Despaigne (1–0)	**Butler** (0–1)	—	12,034	1–1	L1
3	March 31	@ Marlins	10–6 (10)	**Strop** (1–0)	Ziegler (0–1)	—	13,422	2–1	W1

April: 14–9 (Home: 8–4; Away: 6–5)

#	Date	Opponent	Score	Win	Loss	Save	Attendance	Record	Box/ Streak
4	April 1	@ Marlins	0–6	Peters (1–0)	**Quintana** (0–1)	—	10,248	2–2	L1
5	April 2	@ Reds	0–1	Mahle (1–0)	**Chatwood** (0–1)	Iglesias (1)	18,693	2–3	L2
—	April 3	@ Reds	**Postponed (rain)** (Makeup date: May 19)						
6	April 5	@ Brewers	8–0	**Lester** (1–0)	Suter (1–1)	—	24,310	3–3	W1
7	April 6	@ Brewers	4–5	Albers (1–0)	**Montgomery** (0–1)	—	37,758	3–4	L1
8	April 7	@ Brewers	5–2	**Strop** (2–0)	Barnes (0–1)	**Morrow** (1)	43,331	4–4	W1
9	April 8	@ Brewers	3–0	**Quintana** (1–1)	Anderson (0–1)	**Morrow** (2)	39,282	5–4	W2
—	April 9	Pirates	**Postponed (snow)** (Makeup date: April 10)						
10	April 10	Pirates	5–8	Nova (1–1)	**Chatwood** (0–2)	Vázquez (4)	40,144	5–5	L1
11	April 11	Pirates	13–5	**Duensing** (0–1)	Glasnow (0–1)	—	35,596	6–5	W1
12	April 12	Pirates	1–6	Williams (3–0)	**Hendricks** (0–1)	—	29,949	6–6	L1
13	April 13	Braves	0–4	Sánchez (1–0)	**Darvish** (0–1)	—	29,775	6–7	L2
14	April 14	Braves	14–10	**Wilson** (1–0)	Ramírez (0–1)	—	36,788	7–7	W1
—	April 15	Braves	**Postponed (rain)** (Makeup date: May 14)						
—	April 16	Cardinals	**Postponed (snow)** (Makeup date: July 21)						
15	April 17	Cardinals	3–5	Wainwright (1–2)	**Chatwood** (0–3)	Norris (4)	35,103	7–8	L1
—	April 18	Cardinals	**Postponed (rain/cold)** (Makeup date: April 19)						
16	April 19	Cardinals	8–5	**Lester** (2–0)	Weaver (2–1)	**Morrow** (3)	29,648	8–8	W1
17	April 20	@ Rockies	16–5	**Hendricks** (1–1)	Gray (1–4)	—	35,290	9–8	W2
18	April 21	@ Rockies	2–5	Anderson (1–0)	**Darvish** (0–2)	Davis (9)	40,107	9–9	L1
19	April 22	@ Rockies	9–7	**Quintana** (2–1)	Marquez (1–2)	**Morrow** (4)	48,137	10–9	W1
20	April 24	@ Indians	10–3	**Chatwood** (1–3)	Tomlin (0–3)	—	16,408	11–9	W2
21	April 25	@ Indians	1–4	Bauer (2–1)	**Lester** (2–1)	Allen (5)	15,712	11–10	L1
22	April 26	Brewers	1–0	**Hendricks** (2–1)	Anderson (2–2)	**Morrow** (5)	37,197	12–10	W1
23	April 27	Brewers	3–2	**Strop** (3–0)	Jennings (2–1)	**Morrow** (6)	35,579	13–10	W2
24	April 28	Brewers	3–0	**Quintana** (3–1)	Guerra (2–1)	—	40,147	14–10	W3
25	April 29	Brewers	2–0	**Chatwood** (2–3)	Davies (2–3)	**Morrow** (7)	40,895	15–10	W4
26	April 30	Rockies	3–2	**Farrell** (1–0)	Freeland (1–4)	**Cishek** (1)	35,922	16–10	W5

May: 14–13 (Home: 7–7; Away: 7–6)

#	Date	Opponent	Score	Win	Loss	Save	Attendance	Record	Box/ Streak
27	May 1	Rockies	1–3	Gray (3–4)	**Hendricks** (2–2)	Davis (11)	40,077	16–11	L1
28	May 2	Rockies	2–11	Anderson (2–0)	**Darvish** (0–3)	—	32,909	16–12	L2
29	May 4	@ Cardinals	2–3	Mikolas (4–0)	**Quintana** (3–2)	Norris (7)	46,099	16–13	L3
30	May 5	@ Cardinals	6–8 (10)	Lyons (1–0)	**Farrell** (1–1)	—	47,154	16–14	L4
31	May 6	@ Cardinals	3–4 (14)	Mayers (1–0)	**Farrell** (1–2)	—	45,438	16–15	L5
32	May 7	Marlins	14–2	**Hendricks** (3–2)	García (1–1)	—	37,333	17–15	W1
33	May 8	Marlins	4–3	**Edwards Jr.** (1–0)	Barraclough (0–2)	**Morrow** (8)	40,051	18–15	W2
34	May 9	Marlins	13–4	**Quintana** (4–2)	Chen (1–2)	—	34,486	19–15	W3
35	May 11	White Sox	11–2	**Chatwood** (3–3)	Fulmer (2–3)	—	39,585	20–15	W4
36	May 12	White Sox	8–4	**Lester** (3–1)	Shields (1–4)	**Morrow** (9)	41,099	21–15	W5
37	May 13	White Sox	3–5	Giolito (2–4)	**Hendricks** (3–3)	Rondón (1)	40,537	21–16	L1
38	May 14	Braves	5–6	Teherán (4–1)	**Quintana** (4–3)	Minter (2)	35,946	21–17	L2
39	May 15	@ Braves	3–2	**Edwards Jr.** (2–0)	Vizcaíno (1–2)	**Morrow** (10)	34,452	22–17	W1
40	May 16	@ Braves	1–4	Minter (2–0)	**Edwards Jr.** (2–1)	Vizcaíno (8)	28,264	22–18	L1
—	May 17	@ Braves	**Postponed (rain)** (Makeup date: August 30)						
41	May 18	@ Reds	8–1	**Lester** (4–1)	Bailey (1–6)	—	22,060	23–18	W1
42	May 19	@ Reds	4–5 (11)	Floro (1–0)	**Wilson** (1–1)	—	19,046	23–19	L1
43	May 19	@ Reds	10–0	**Quintana** (5–3)	Romano (2–5)	—	26,082	24–19	W1
44	May 20	@ Reds	6–1	**Darvish** (1–3)	Mahle (3–6)	—	26,988	25–19	W2
45	May 22	Indians	1–10	Bauer (4–3)	**Chatwood** (3–4)	—	37,168	25–20	L1
46	May 23	Indians	0–1	Plutko (2–0)	**Lester** (4–2)	Allen (7)	39,004	25–21	L2
47	May 25	Giants	6–2	**Hendricks** (4–3)	Holland (2–6)	**Morrow** (11)	41,177	26–21	W1
48	May 26	Giants	4–5	Stratton (6–3)	**Quintana** (5–4)	Strickland (10)	41,250	26–22	L1
49	May 27	Giants	8–3	**Rosario** (1–0)	Blach (3–5)	—	41,587	27–22	W1
50	May 28	@ Pirates	7–0	**Montgomery** (1–1)	Kuhl (4–3)	—	19,382	28–22	W2
51	May 29	@ Pirates	8–6	**Lester** (5–2)	Santana (2–1)	**Morrow** (12)	11,475	29–22	W3
52	May 30	@ Pirates	1–2	Musgrove (2–0)	**Hendricks** (4–4)	Vázquez (10)	14,126	29–23	L1
53	May 31	@ Mets	5–1	**Quintana** (6–4)	Robles (2–2)	**Morrow** (13)	34,458	30–23	W1

June: 16–12 (Home: 9–3; Away: 8–9)

#	Date	Opponent	Score	Win	Loss	Save	Attendance	Record	Box/ Streak
54	June 1	@ Mets	7–4	**Rosario** (2–0)	Sewald (0–4)	**Morrow** (14)	37,183	31–23	W2
55	June 2	@ Mets	7–1 (14)	**Farrell** (2–2)	Baumann (0–2)	—	32,817	32–23	W3
56	June 3	@ Mets	2–0	**Lester** (6–2)	Matz (2–4)	**Duensing** (1)	34,946	33–23	W4
57	June 5	Phillies	1–6	Eflin (2–2)	**Hendricks** (4–5)	—	40,553	33–24	L1
58	June 6	Phillies	7–5	**Mazzoni** (1–0)	Morgan (0–2)	—	40,275	34–24	W1
59	June 7	Phillies	4–3	**Duensing** (2–0)	Pivetta (4–5)	**Morrow** (15)	40,057	35–24	W2
60	June 8	Pirates	3–1	**Montgomery** (2–1)	Kuhl (4–4)	**Strop** (1)	40,097	36–24	W3
61	June 9	Pirates	2–0	**Lester** (7–2)	Kingham (2–3)	**Cishek** (2)	41,045	37–24	W4
62	June 10	Pirates	1–7	Nova (3–5)	**Hendricks** (4–6)	—	40,735	37–25	L1
63	June 11	@ Brewers	7–2	**Rosario** (3–0)	Albers (3–2)	—	37,578	38–25	W1
64	June 12	@ Brewers	0–4	Anderson (5–5)	**Chatwood** (3–5)	—	35,459	38–26	L1
65	June 13	@ Brewers	0–1	Chacín (6–1)	**Montgomery** (2–2)	Knebel (6)	39,822	38–27	L2
66	June 15	@ Cardinals	13–5	**Lester** (8–2)	Wacha (8–2)	—	46,188	39–27	W1
67	June 16	@ Cardinals	6–3	**Hendricks** (5–6)	Tuivailala (1–2)	**Morrow** (16)	47,168	40–27	W2
68	June 17	@ Cardinals	0–5	Brebbia (1–1)	**Quintana** (6–5)	—	46,214	40–28	L1
—	June 18	Dodgers	**Postponed (rain)** (Makeup date: June 19)						
69	June 19	Dodgers	3–4	Paredes (2–0)	**Wilson** (1–2)	Jansen (18)	39,273	40–29	L2
70	June 19	Dodgers	2–1 (10)	**Zastryzny** (1–0)	Stewart (0–1)	—	40,409	41–29	W1
71	June 20	Dodgers	4–0	**Lester** (9–2)	Stripling (6–2)	—	41,199	42–29	W2
72	June 21	@ Reds	2–6	Harvey (2–5)	**Hendricks** (5–7)	Hughes (5)	19,581	42–30	L1
73	June 22	@ Reds	3–6	Castillo (5–8)	**Quintana** (6–6)	Iglesias (12)	25,885	42–31	L2
74	June 23	@ Reds	2–11	DeSclafani (3–1)	**Farrell** (2–3)	—	36,818	42–32	L3
75	June 24	@ Reds	6–8	Stephens (1–0)	**Strop** (3–1)	Iglesias (13)	30,508	42–33	L4
76	June 25	@ Dodgers	1–2	Maeda (5–4)	**Underwood Jr.** (0–1)	Jansen (20)	41,750	42–34	L5
77	June 26	@ Dodgers	9–4	**Lester** (10–2)	García (1–2)	—	53,904	43–34	W1
78	June 27	@ Dodgers	5–7	Wood (4–5)	**Hendricks** (5–8)	Jansen (21)	42,121	43–35	L1
79	June 28	@ Dodgers	11–5	**Cishek** (2–0)	Buehler (4–2)	—	52,187	44–35	W1
80	June 29	Twins	10–6	**Mongtomery** (3–2)	Berríos (8–6)	**Morrow** (17)	41,492	45–35	W2
81	June 30	Twins	14–9	**Wilson** (2–2)	Hildenberger (1–2)	—	40,950	46–35	W3

July: 15–10 (Home: 10–5; Away: 5–5)

#	Date	Opponent	Score	Win	Loss	Save	Attendance	Record	Box/ Streak
82	July 1	Twins	11–10	**Lester** (11–2)	Lynn (5–7)	**Morrow** (18)	40,051	47–35	W4
83	July 3	Tigers	5–3	**Wilson** (3–2)	Stumpf (1–4)	**Strop** (2)	38,424	48–35	W5
84	July 4	Tigers	5–2	**Quintana** (7–6)	Liriano (3–5)	**Morrow** (19)	40,510	49–35	W6
85	July 6	Reds	2–3	Mahle (7–6)	**Montgomery** (3–3)	Iglesias (17)	41,434	49–36	L1
86	July 7	Reds	8–7	**Rosario** (4–0)	Hughes (2–3)	**Morrow** (20)	41,538	50–36	W1
87	July 8	Reds	6–5 (10)	**Farrell** (3–3)	Stephens (2–2)	—	38,655	51–36	W2
88	July 9	@ Giants	1–2 (11)	Blach (6–5)	**Cishek** (2–1)	—	38,024	51–37	L1
89	July 10	@ Giants	2–0	**Quintana** (8–6)	Holland (5–8)	**Cishek** (3)	39,113	52–37	W1
90	July 11	@ Giants	4–5 (13)	Rodríguez (4–1)	**Norwood** (0–1)	—	41,099	52–38	L1
91	July 13	@ Padres	5–4 (10)	**Strop** (4–1)	Cimber (3–5)	**Morrow** (21)	38,988	53–38	W1
92	July 14	@ Padres	11–6	**Hendricks** (6–8)	Perdomo (1–4)	—	38,837	54–38	W2
93	July 15	@ Padres	7–4	**Lester** (12–2)	Lauer (5–6)	**Morrow** (22)	37,672	55–38	W3
ASG	**89th All-Star Game** at Nationals Park in Washington, District of Columbia, United States								Box
ASG	July 17	NL All-Stars 6, **AL All-Stars** 8 (10)		Díaz (SEA)	Stripling (LAD)	Happ (TOR)	43,843	AL; 44–43–2	Box
ASG	Representing the Cubs: Javier Báez, Willson Contreras, and Jon Lester								Box
94	July 19	Cardinals	9–6	**Duensing** (3–0)	Martínez (6–6)	**Strop** (3)	41,406	56–38	W4
95	July 20	Cardinals	5–18	Flaherty (4–4)	**Lester** (12–3)	—	41,077	56–39	L1
96	July 21	Cardinals	7–2	**Chatwood** (4–5)	Weaver (5–9)	—	41,004	57–39	W1
97	July 21	Cardinals	3–6	Tuivailala (2–3)	**Wilson** (3–3)	Norris (18)	41,244	57–40	L1
98	July 22	Cardinals	7–2	**Quintana** (9–6)	Mayers (2–1)	—	39,737	58–40	W1
99	July 23	Diamondbacks	1–7	Corbin (7–4)	**Farrell** (3–4)	—	40,859	58–41	L1
100	July 24	Diamondbacks	1–5	Buchholz (3–1)	**Hendricks** (6–9)	—	40,869	58–42	L2
101	July 25	Diamondbacks	2–1	**Edwards Jr.** (3–1)	McFarland (2–2)	**Strop** (4)	35,548	59–42	W1
102	July 26	Diamondbacks	7–6	**Butler** (1–1)	Boxberger (1–4)	—	38,979	60–42	W2
103	July 27	@ Cardinals	2–5	Weaver (6–9)	**Montgomery** (3–4)	Norris (20)	47,169	60–43	L1
104	July 28	@ Cardinals	2–6	Mikolas (11–3)	**Quintana** (9–7)	—	47,514	60–44	L2
105	July 29	@ Cardinals	5–2	**Hendricks** (7–9)	Gant (3–4)	**Strop** (5)	45,553	61–44	W1
106	July 31	@ Pirates	4–5	Taillon (8–8)	**Lester** (12–4)	Vázquez (24)	18,972	61–45	L1

August 18–10 (Home: 11–5; Away: 7–5)

#	Date	Opponent	Score	Win	Loss	Save	Attendance	Record	Box/ Streak
107	August 1	@ Pirates	9–2	**Hamels** (6–9)	Kingham (5–6)	—	18,600	62–45	W1
108	August 2	Padres	1–6	Erlin (2–3)	**Chavez** (3–2)	—	40,714	62–46	L1
109	August 3	Padres	5–4	**Quintana** (10–7)	Ross (6–9)	**Strop** (6)	40,894	63–46	W1
110	August 4	Padres	5–4	**Hendricks** (8–9)	Lockett (0–2)	**Strop** (7)	40,855	64–46	W2
111	August 5	Padres	6–10	Stammen (5–1)	**Edwards, Jr.** (3–2)	—	41,136	64–47	L1
112	August 6	@ Royals	3–1	**Hamels** (7–9)	McCarthy (4–4)	**Strop** (8)	32,339	65–47	W1
113	August 7	@ Royals	5–0	**Montgomery** (4–4)	Keller (4–5)	—	27,883	66–47	W2
114	August 8	@ Royals	0–9	Fillmyer (1–1)	**Quintana** (10–8)	—	24,294	66–48	L1
115	August 10	Nationals	3–2	**Cishek** (3–1)	Solís (1–2)	**Strop** (9)	41,531	67–48	W1
116	August 11	Nationals	4–9	Roark (7–12)	**Lester** (12–5)	—	41,320	67–49	L1
117	August 12	Nationals	4–3	**Wilson** (4–3)	Madson (2–5)	—	36,490	68–49	W1
118	August 14	Brewers	0–7	Chacín (12–4)	**Quintana** (10–9)	—	40,441	68–50	L1
119	August 15	Brewers	8–4	**Hendricks** (9–9)	Guerra (6–8)	—	39,619	69–50	W1
120	August 16	@ Pirates	1–0	**Lester** (13–5)	Nova (7–7)	**Strop** (10)	21,783	70–50	W2
121	August 17	@ Pirates	1–0	**Hamels** (8–9)	Williams (10–9)	**Chavez** (2)	24,298	71–50	W3
122	August 18	@ Pirates	1–3	Musgrove (5–7)	**Chatwood** (4–6)	Vázquez (27)	35,100	71–51	L1
123	August 19	@ Pirates	1–2 (11)	Rodríguez (3–2)	**Kintzler** (1–3)	—	24,283	71–52	L2
124	August 21	@ Tigers	1–2	Zimmermann (6–5)	**Hendricks** (9–10)	Greene (27)	26,638	71–53	L3
125	August 22	@ Tigers	8–2	**Lester** (14–5)	Liriano (3–9)	—	28,286	72–53	W1
126	August 23	Reds	7–1	**Hamels** (9–9)	DeSclafani (6–4)	—	41,130	73–53	W2
127	August 24	Reds	3–2 (10)	**Chavez** (4–2)	Iglesias (2–2)	—	37,760	74–53	W3
128	August 25	Reds	10–6	**Quintana** (11–9)	Castillo (7–11)	—	41,205	75–53	W4
129	August 26	Reds	9–0	**Hendricks** (10–10)	Bailey (1–12)	—	40,331	76–53	W5
130	August 27	Mets	7–4	**Cishek** (4–1)	Blevins (1–2)	**Chavez** (3)	38,935	77–53	W6
131	August 28	Mets	2–1 (11)	**Chavez** (5–2)	Sewald (0–5)	—	37,017	78–53	W7
132	August 29	Mets	3–10	Vargas (5–8)	**Mills** (0–1)	—	33,386	78–54	L1
133	August 30	@ Braves	5–4	**Kintzler** (2–3)	Foltynewicz (10–9)	**Strop** (11)	37,603	79–54	W1
134	August 31	@ Phillies	1–2 (10)	Neshek (2–1)	**Cishek** (4–2)	—	22,556	79–55	L1

September/October: 16–12 (Home: 7–6; Away: 9–6)

#	Date	Opponent	Score	Win	Loss	Save	Attendance	Record	Box/ Streak
135	September 1	@ Phillies	7–1	**Hendricks** (11–10)	Eflin (9–6)	—	33,040	80–55	W1
136	September 2	@ Phillies	8–1	**Lester** (15–5)	Nola (15–4)	—	36,517	81–55	W2
137	September 3	@ Brewers	3–4	Jeffress (8–1)	**Cishek** (4–3)	—	44,462	81–56	L1
138	September 4	@ Brewers	1–11	Miley 3–2	**Montgomery** (4–5)	—	37,269	81–57	L2
139	September 5	@ Brewers	6–4	**Quintana** (12–9)	Chacin (14–6)	**Strop** (12)	37,427	82–57	W1
140	September 6	@ Nationals	6–4 (10)	**Strop** (5–1)	Cordero (1–2)	**Chavez** (4)	32,070	83–57	W2
—	September 7	@ Nationals	**Postponed (rain)** (Makeup date: September 8)						
141	September 8	@ Nationals	3–10	Scherzer (17–6)	**García** (3–7)	—	41,346 (Note: Single-admission doubleheader.)	83–58	L1
142	September 8	@ Nationals	5–6	Suero (2–0)	**Wilson** (4–4)	Holland (2)	41,346	83–59	L2
—	September 9	@ Nationals	**Postponed (rain)** (Makeup date: September 13)						
143	September 10	Brewers	2–3	Miley (4–2)	**Lester** (15–6)	Jeffress (11)	38,471	83–60	L3
144	September 11	Brewers	3–0	**Quintana** (13–9)	Chacin (14–7)	**Strop** (13)	37,017	84–60	W1
145	September 12	Brewers	1–5	Hader (6–1)	**Hendricks** (11–11)	—	40,234	84–61	L1
146	September 13	@ Nationals	4–3 (10)	**Strop** (6–1)	Doolittle (3–3)	**Rosario** (1)	30,173	85–61	W1
147	September 14	Reds	3–2	**Maples** (1–0)	Hernandez (5–1)	**De La Rosa** (1)	36,468	86–61	W2
148	September 15	Reds	1–0	**Lester** (16–6)	Romano (7–11)	**Cishek** (4)	41,196	87–61	W3
149	September 16	Reds	1–2	Castillo (10–12)	**Quintana** (13–10)	Iglesias (27)	41,314	87–62	L1
150	September 17	@ Diamondbacks	5–1	**Hendricks** (12–11)	Corbin (11–6)	—	27,662	88–62	W1
151	September 18	@ Diamondbacks	9–1	**Montgomery** (5–5)	Andriese (3–6)	—	26,095	89–62	W2
152	September 19	@ Diamondbacks	0–9	Ray (6–2)	**Hamels** (9–10)	—	25,715	89–63	L1
153	September 21	@ White Sox	4–10	López (7–9)	**Quintana** (13–11)	—	34,027	89–64	L2
154	September 22	@ White Sox	8–3	**Lester** (17–6)	Giolito (10–12)	—	39,724	90–64	W1
155	September 23	@ White Sox	6–1	**Hendricks** (13–11)	Rodon (6–7)	—	39,449	91–64	W2
156	September 24	Pirates	1–5	Taillon (14–9)	**Hamels** (9–11)	—	34,570	91–65	L1
157	September 25	Pirates	0–6	Archer (6–8)	**Montgomery** (5–6)	—	33,443	91–66	L2
158	September 26	Pirates	7–6 (10)	**Kintzler** (3–3)	Rodríguez (4–3)	—	32,874	92–66	W1
159	September 27	Pirates	3–0	**Lester** (18–6)	Williams (14–10)	**Chavez** (5)	38,415	93–66	W2
160	September 28	Cardinals	8–4	**Hendricks** (14–11)	Wainwright (2–4)	—	39,442	94–66	W3
161	September 29	Cardinals	1–2	Mikolas (18–4)	**Hamels** (9–12)	Martinez (5)	40,784	94–67	L1
162	September 30	Cardinals	10–5	**Webster** (1–0)	Flaherty (8–9)	—	39,275	95–67	W1
163	October 1	Brewers	1–3	Knebel (4–3)	**Wilson** (4–5)	Hader (12)	38,450	95–68	L1

Legend: = Win = Loss = Postponement
Bold = Cubs team member

=== Postseason game log ===
2018 postseason game log: 0–1 (Home: 0–1; Away: 0–0)
NL Wild Card: 0–1 (Home: 0–1; Away: 0–0)

#	Date	Opponent	Score	Win	Loss	Save	Attendance	Record
1	October 2	Rockies	1–2 (13)	Oberg (1–0)	**Hendricks** (0–1)	—	40,151	0–1

=== Season standings ===
NL Central
Team	W	L	Pct.	GB	Home	Road
Milwaukee Brewers	96	67	.589	—	51‍–‍30	45‍–‍37
Chicago Cubs	95	68	.583	1	51‍–‍31	44‍–‍37
St. Louis Cardinals	88	74	.543	7½	43‍–‍38	45‍–‍36
Pittsburgh Pirates	82	79	.509	13	44‍–‍36	38‍–‍43
Cincinnati Reds	67	95	.414	28½	37‍–‍44	30‍–‍51

Division leaders
Team	W	L	Pct.
Milwaukee Brewers	96	67	.589
Los Angeles Dodgers	92	71	.564
Atlanta Braves	90	72	.556

Wild Card teams (Top 2 teams qualify for postseason)
Team	W	L	Pct.	GB
Chicago Cubs	95	68	.583	+4
Colorado Rockies	91	72	.558	—
St. Louis Cardinals	88	74	.543	2½
Pittsburgh Pirates	82	79	.509	8
Arizona Diamondbacks	82	80	.506	8½
Washington Nationals	82	80	.506	8½
Philadelphia Phillies	80	82	.494	10½
New York Mets	77	85	.475	13½
San Francisco Giants	73	89	.451	17½
Cincinnati Reds	67	95	.414	23½
San Diego Padres	66	96	.407	24½
Miami Marlins	63	98	.391	27

=== Record vs. opponents ===
2018 National League record Source: MLB Standings Grid – 2018
Team	AZ	ATL	CHC	CIN	COL	LAD	MIA	MIL	NYM	PHI	PIT	SD	SF	STL	WSH	AL
Arizona	—	3–4	3–4	3–3	8–11	11–8	6–1	1–5	2–5	4–2	6–1	12–7	8–11	3–3	2–5	10–10
Atlanta	4–3	—	3–3	3–4	2–5	2–5	14–5	3–4	13–6	12–7	5–1	4–3	3–3	4–2	10–9	8–12
Chicago	4–3	3–3	—	11–8	3–3	4–3	5–2	11–9	6–1	4–2	10–9	5–2	3–3	9–10	4–3	13–7
Cincinnati	3–3	4–3	8–11	—	2–4	6–1	2–5	6–13	3–3	3–4	5–14	3–4	4–2	7–12	1–6	10–10
Colorado	11–8	5–2	3–3	4–2	—	7–13	2–4	2–5	6–1	5–2	3–3	11–8	12–7	2–5	5–2	13–7
Los Angeles	8–11	5–2	3–4	1–6	13–7	—	2–4	4–3	4–2	3–4	5–1	14–5	10–9	3–4	5–1	12–8
Miami	1–6	5–14	2–5	5–2	4–2	4–2	—	2–5	7–12	8–11	1–4	2–5	4–3	3–3	6–13	9–11
Milwaukee	5–1	4–3	9–11	13–6	5–2	3–4	5–2	—	4–3	3–3	7–12	4–2	6–1	11–8	4–2	13–7
New York	5–2	6–13	1–6	3–3	1–6	2–4	12–7	3–4	—	11–8	3–4	4–2	4–3	3–3	11–8	8–12
Philadelphia	2–4	7–12	2–4	4–3	2–5	4–3	11–8	3–3	8–11	—	6–1	3–3	4–3	4–3	8–11	12–8
Pittsburgh	1–6	1–5	9–10	14–5	3–3	1–5	4–1	12–7	4–3	1–6	—	3–4	4–3	8–11	2–5	15–5
San Diego	7–12	3–4	2–5	4–3	8–11	5–14	5–2	2–4	2–4	3–3	4–3	—	8–11	4–3	2–4	7–13
San Francisco	11–8	3–3	3–3	2–4	7–12	9–10	3–4	1–6	3–4	3–4	3–4	11–8	—	2–5	4–2	8–12
St. Louis	3–3	2–4	10–9	12–7	5–2	4–3	3–3	8–11	3–3	3–4	11–8	3–4	5–2	—	5–2	11–9
Washington	5–2	9–10	3–4	6–1	2–5	1–5	13–6	2–4	8–11	11–8	5–2	4–2	2–4	2–5	—	9–11

The October 1 tiebreaker games were regular-season games that are included here.

=== Opening Day starters ===
Thursday, March 29, 2018, at Miami Marlins

Name	Pos.
Ian Happ	CF
Kris Bryant	3B
Anthony Rizzo	1B
Willson Contreras	C
Kyle Schwarber	LF
Addison Russell	SS
Jason Heyward	RF
Javier Báez	2B
Jon Lester	P

=== Season summary ===
==== February ====
- **February 27** – Cubs announced Jon Lester will be the opening day starter on March 29 against the Miami Marlins.

==== March ====
- **March 29** – On Opening Day, Ian Happ homered on the first pitch of the game while Anthony Rizzo and Kyle Schwarber each hit solo home runs. Jon Lester struggled and could not make it out of the fourth, but the bullpen pitched 5.2 scoreless innings as Tommy La Stella hit a pinch-hit two-run double in the seventh to give the Cubs the 8–4 win.
- **March 30** – Kyle Hendricks allowed one run over six innings, but the Cubs only managed one run in support. In a game that lasted 17 innings, Eddie Butler pitched seven innings of relief before leaving in the 17th and being replaced by Brandon Morrow, in his Cub debut, who allowed the game-winning hit. The Cubs fell to the Marlins 2–1, striking out 20 times in the game.
- **March 31** – Yu Darvish made his Cub debut, but struggled, giving up five runs in 4.1 innings. The Cub bullpen came through again against the Marlins, pitching 5.2 innings of one-run relief, but the game still went to extra innings. Ben Zobrist drove in the go-ahead run in the 10th and Kris Bryant cleared the bases with a double to give the Cubs the 10–6 win.

==== April ====
- **April 1** – In the final game of the opening series against Miami, José Quintana took a no-hitter into the fifth inning before falling apart and allowing six runs. The Cub bats were quiet again, failing to score as the Cubs lost 6–0.
- **April 2** – Traveling to Cincinnati to take on the Reds, the Cub offense continued to struggle as 11 Cubs struck out in a 1–0 loss. The Cubs set a National League record for strikeouts in their first five games with 58.
- **April 3** – Rain washed out the final game of the short two-game series with the Reds. The game will be made up May 19.
- **April 5** – The Cubs next traveled to Milwaukee to take on the Brewers. Javier Báez drove in two runs with a single in the second and scored from first when Jon Lester reached on an error to give the Cubs a 3–0 lead. Albert Almora Jr., Addison Russell, and Kris Bryant each drove in a run before Jason Heyward hit a two-run homer in the top of the ninth to give the Cubs the 8–0 win. Lester pitched six strong innings while only allowing three hits in the win while the Cub bullpen continued its strong start.
- **April 6** – Kyle Hendricks gave up four runs in five innings of work, but Javier Báez tied it with an RBI triple that he scored on following a Brewer error. However, an error by Kris Bryant in the bottom of the ninth set the stage for a walk-off single for Orlando Arcia as the Cubs fell 5–4. Anthony Rizzo missed the game with back soreness.
- **April 7** – Yu Darvish pitched six dominant innings, allowing only one run but left the game tied. The Brewers took the lead in the eighth, but Ben Zobrist drove in the tying run on an infield single in the ninth. Ian Happ drove in two more runs and Jon Lester pinch hit and drove in a run on a bunt as the Cubs won 5–2. Brandon Morrow earned his first save as a Cub in the game.
- **April 8** – José Quintana pitched six scoreless innings and the Cubs bullpen continued its strong performance shutting out the Brewers 3–0. Ben Zobrist homered and Albert Almora Jr. drove in a run in the win as the Cubs finished their season-opening road trip with a 5–4 record. Anthony Rizzo missed his third straight game due to a back injury.
- **April 9** – Snow forced the Wrigley Field home opener to be delayed a day.
- **April 10** – With Anthony Rizzo going to the DL with his back injury, Javier Báez homered twice against the Pittsburgh Pirates. However, Báez struck out as the tying run in the eighth and the Cubs fell 8–5. Tyler Chatwood gave up five runs in five innings and Mike Montgomery gave up three runs in the loss.
- **April 11** – For the second straight day, Javier Báez homered twice, this time driving in four runs while Ian Happ hit a pinch-hit two-run home run as the Cubs clobbered the Pirates 13–5. Ben Zobrist and Kris Bryant also drove in two runs each in the rout.
- **April 12** – Kyle Hendricks allowed two runs in six innings of work, but Justin Wilson gave up four runs while walking three in less than an inning as the Cubs fell to the Pirates 6–1. The Cub offense struggled again, scoring only one run on Kyle Schwarber's solo home run in the fourth.
- **April 13** – Yu Darvish gave up four runs in 4.2 innings and the Cub offense was shut out by the visiting Atlanta Braves 4–0. The Cubs managed only four hits while striking out nine times in the loss.
- **April 14** – In miserable rainy and cold conditions at Wrigley Field, the Cubs fell behind 10–2 to the Braves after four innings. José Quintana struggled again, giving up seven runs in 2.1 innings. The Cub offense struggled as well for most of the game, but added one run in the sixth inning and two in the seventh to draw within five runs. In the eighth inning, the Braves' bullpen fell apart as the Cubs scored nine runs. Javier Báez drove in four runs in the game, three in the eighth, as the Braves hit two batters and walked five in the inning to allow the Cubs to come back to win 14–10.
- **April 15** – Rain washed out the final game of the Braves series. The game will be made up on May 14.
- **April 16** – For the second straight day, the Cubs postponed a game due to weather conditions, this time snow and cold weather. The game against the St. Louis Cardinals will be made up as part of a day-night doubleheader on July 21.
- **April 17** – In cold conditions yet again, Tyler Chatwood struggled again, giving up seven walks and two runs before being replaced in the fifth inning. Pedro Strop gave up three Cardinal runs in less than an inning as the Cubs trailed the Cards 5–1 in the eighth. Javier Báez continued his strong play on the homestand homering to narrow the deficit to 5–3 in the eighth, but the Cubs could not complete the comeback falling 5–3. Báez had three hits in the game as Anthony Rizzo returned from the disabled list, but the Cubs continued their rough start to the season.
- **April 18** – For the third time in four days, the Cub game was postponed due to weather conditions. The game would be made up the next day.
- **April 19** – Jon Lester pitched six strong innings and allowed one unearned run while the Cub offense broke open the game early scoring eight runs on 14 hits. Kris Bryant and Kyle Schwarber drove in two runs each while Jason Heyward homered as the Cubs took an 8–1 lead. Eddie Butler allowed four runs in the seventh to narrow the lead but the Cub bullpen closed the door from there as the Cubs beat the Cardinals 8–5.
- **April 20** – The Cubs returned to the road to face the Colorado Rockies in Denver. Javier Báez and Kyle Schwarber each homered and drove in four runs while Jason Heyward also drove in two runs. Kyle Hendricks gave up three runs in five innings as the Cubs blew out the Rockies 16–5.
- **April 21** – Yu Darvish pitched four shutout innings before giving up five runs in the fifth inning. Willson Contreras gave the Cubs an early 2–0 lead in the first inning on a double, but the Cub offense managed nothing further in the game and the Cubs fell 5–2. The Cubs placed Ben Zobrist on the DL prior to the game and his replacement, David Bote made his big league debut in the game.
- **April 22** – Kris Bryant was hit in the face on a pitch in the first inning and forced to leave the game. He passed all concussion tests and appeared to only suffer a contusion on his face from the pitch. Albert Almora Jr., making his fourth straight start in center field, made three highlight reel catches in the game and the Cubs jumped out to an early lead on consecutive first-inning singles by Tommy La Stella, Kyle Schwarber, and Victor Caratini to give the Cubs the 3–0 lead. Javier Báez hit his seventh home run on the season and drove in three runs, but the Cubs still had to hang on for the 9–7 win with Brandon Morrow earning his fourth save.
- **April 24** – After an off day, Kris Bryant remained out of the lineup as the Cubs returned to Cleveland for the first time since their Game 7 World Series win in 2016 to face the Indians. The Cub offense remained hot as Kyle Schwarber hit two home runs while Willson Contreras hit his first home run of the year. Ian Happ also homered as Albert Almora Jr. led off for the fifth consecutive game. Tyler Chatwood earned his first win as the Cubs blew out the Indians 10–3. The Cubs moved to 11–9 on the season, two games over .500 for the first time on the year. Javier Báez and Kyle Schwarber continued their strong start to the season.
- **April 25** – Kris Bryant missed his second consecutive game as the Cubs finished their short two-game series against the Indians. Jon Lester became the first Cub starter to pitch seven innings (Eddie Butler having pitched seven in relief on March 30), but he gave up three solo home runs as the Cubs lost 4–1. Anthony Rizzo drove in the Cubs only run in the game as the Cub offense struggled again, leaving nine runners on base.
- **April 26** – In a pitcher's duel, Kyle Hendricks pitched seven shutout innings and Kyle Schwarber homered to give the Cubs a 1–0 win over the Brewers at Wrigley Field in the first of a four-game series. The win ended the Brewers' eight-game winning streak. Kris Bryant missed his third straight game after being hit by a pitch on Sunday.
- **April 27** – Yu Darvish pitched six innings allowing only one run and left with the lead on the strength of RBI singles by Javier Báez and Anthony Rizzo. However, the Brewers tied it in the seventh before Addison Russell scored the go-ahead run in the bottom half of the inning on an error by Brewer shortstop Eric Sogard. Brandon Morrow earned his sixth save of the season by pitching a perfect ninth inning in the 3–2 win. The win moved the Cubs three games over .500 for the first time on the season. Kris Bryant missed his fourth straight game.
- **April 28** – José Quintana pitched seven shutout innings while the Wrigley Field wind played havoc with fly balls. Javier Báez drove in a run on a pop up that turned into a double when the wind pushed it away from the Brewers' outfielders to give the Cubs a 1–0 lead. Tommy La Stella drove in two runs on a pinch-hit single in the seventh to give the Cubs a 3–0 lead. The Cub bullpen shut out the Brewers the rest of the way as the Cubs won their sixth game out of seven against the Brewers on the season 3–0. Kris Bryant returned to the lineup in the game as did Ben Zobrist who had been activated off the disabled list prior to the game.
- **April 29** – Looking for the four-game sweep, Tyler Chatwood pitched seven shutout innings for the Cubs while driving in the go-ahead run in the fifth. Addison Russell drove in a run in during the sixth as the Cubs only needed one, shutting out the Brewers again, this time 2–0. The Cubs swept the four-game series from the Brewers and beat the Brewers for the seventh time in eight games to start the season. The win moved the Cubs to 15–10 on the season and only half a game out of first place. In the four-game series, the Cubs only allowed two runs, only one earned, the first time they had allowed only two runs in a four-game series since 1919.
- **April 30** – Anthony Rizzo drove in the winning run with a groundout in the sixth inning following a Kris Bryant triple. The Cub pitching was again spectacular, allowing only two runs, none earned, in the 3–2 win over the Rockies at Wrigley Field. Luke Farrell got his first career win in relief and Steve Cishek earned his first save as a Cub as Brandon Morrow had the night off. Addison Russell and Albert Almora Jr. each drove in a run as the Cubs won their fifth straight and moved into sole possession of first place in the NL Central.

==== May ====
- **May 1** – With the wind blowing out at Wrigley for the second consecutive day, Kyle Hendricks allowed three solo home runs while the Cubs managed only a solo lead off home run by Anthony Rizzo. Former Cub Wade Davis pitched a scoreless ninth inning for the save for the Rockies as the Cubs fell 3–1.
- **May 2** – Yu Darvish failed once again to make it out of the fifth inning, giving up six runs and three home runs to the Rockies. Kris Bryant and Anthony Rizzo each hit solo home runs, but the Cub bullpen also struggled giving up five runs. Willson Contreras committed two errors in the game as the Cubs were blown out 11–2.
- **May 4** – The Cubs returned to the road after an off day to face the St. Louis Cardinals. José Quintana allowed five hits and three runs in four innings of work, but the Cub bullpen held the Cardinals scoreless for the remainder of the game. The Cub offense, however, continued to struggle, failing to score a run until the ninth when they pushed two runs across the plate before Kris Bryant grounded out to end the game. The Cubs lost their third in a row, falling 3–2 to the Cardinals.
- **May 5** – For the first time in 10 games, the Cub offense scored more than three runs, scoring four runs in the second inning though none were on hard hit balls. Tyler Chatwood surrendered the lead in the fourth, giving up four runs and leaving the game tied in the fifth. Javier Báez homered in the sixth to put the Cubs back in front and Anthony Rizzo hit his fourth homer of the season in the seventh to stretch the lead to 6–4. However, Brendan Morrow allowed his first runs as a Cubs closer blowing the lead and forcing the game to extra innings tied at six. In the bottom of the 10th, Kolten Wong hit a two-run home run to give the Cardinals the 8–6 win and the fourth loss in a row for the Cubs.
- **May 6** – In the series finale against the Cardinals, the game was delayed twice by rain and the Cubs took the lead twice only to give the up the lead almost immediately. Jon Lester allowed two runs in 5.1 innings of work and the game went to extra innings tied at two. In the 14th, Javier Báez hit his ninth home run of the season to give the Cubs the 3–2 lead, but Luke Farrell, for the second straight game, gave up a two-run walk-off home run, this time to former Cub, Dexter Fowler, as the Cubs lost 4–3.
- **May 7** – The Cubs returned home for a three-game series against the Marlins. With the Cub offense struggling, Kyle Hendricks pitched eight innings of two-run ball. The Cub offense also woke up in a big way as Ian Happ homered twice while Kris Bryant and Javier Báez also homered. Báez would later leave the game with groin tightness, but the Cubs ended their five-game losing streak, winning 14–2. Prior to the game, it was announced Yu Darvish was placed on the DL with the flu, but would likely miss only one start.
- **May 8** – Jen-Ho Tseng was called up from Iowa to make the start for game two of the series against the Marlins, but lasted only two innings while giving up three runs. The Cub bullpen kept up its strong performance on the season, not allowing another run in seven innings of work. Victor Caratini drove in two runs including the tying and go-ahead run as the Cubs came from behind to defeat the Marlins 4–3. Prior to the game, Jason Heyward was placed on the concussion DL, having injured himself on Dexter Fowler's walk-off home run on Sunday night. David Bote, called up take Heyward's place on the roster, had a pinch hit two-run double in the second to narrow the Marlin lead to 3–2.
- **May 9** – Kris Bryant hit his 100th career home run while Anthony Rizzo homered and drove in five runs. Addison Russell hit his first homer of the year and drove in two as the Cubs blew out the Marlins 13–4. José Quintana pitched six innings while only giving up two runs as the Cubs swept the Marlins in the three-game series.
- **May 11** – After an off day, the Cubs welcomed the crosstown rival Chicago White Sox to Wrigley Field. The Cubs jumped up quickly on the Sox, scoring five runs in the first inning. Willson Contreras hit a grand slam in the first, a solo home run in the sixth, and doubled twice, driving in a career-high seven RBIs as the Cubs routed the Sox. Kris Bryant also drove in two runs in the 11–2 win, the Cubs' fourth straight.
- **May 12** – After a two-hour plus rain delay, the Cubs jumped up quickly on the Sox again, this time scoring four runs in the first and adding one in the second. Willson Contreras homered again and drove in three runs giving him 10 RBI in the two game against the Sox. Anthony Rizzo hit a three-run homer as the Cubs held off the Sox 8–4.
- **May 13** – In the finale of the interleague series against the Sox, the Cubs jumped up early on the Sox again, taking a 2–0 lead in the first on a Javier Báez two-run scoring single. The Sox rallied to tie it at two, but after the Cubs took a 3–2 lead on an Ian Happ double, the Sox again rallied and took the lead. The Cubs could manage nothing further, ending their five-game winning streak with the 5–3 loss.
- **May 14** – In a makeup of a previous rain out, José Quintana struggled against the visiting Braves, allowing six runs in less than five innings. Albert Almora Jr. and Kris Bryant each hit two-run homers to take leads, but Quintana surrendered the lead each time. The Cubs still found themselves down 6–4 in the bottom of the ninth when Ian Happ drove in a run with two outs on a bases load hit by pitch to narrow the lead to 6–5, but Bryant could not drive in the tying run, flying out to the end the game.
- **May 15** – After playing in Chicago, the Cubs and Braves travelled to Atlanta to play a three-game series. Yu Darvish came off the DL to make the start against the Braves. Darvish pitched four innings and allowed one run before leaving with a leg cramp. However, the Cubs remained tied at one into the eighth inning before Carl Edwards Jr. allowed a home run to rookie Ronald Acuña Jr. to give the Braves a 2–1 lead. In the ninth, Albert Almora Jr. doubled with one out and scored on an Addison Russell game-tying double. Ben Zobrist then drove in Russell to give the Cubs the lead and Brandon Morrow pitched a perfect bottom half of the ninth to give the Cubs the 3–2 win.
- **May 16** – Tyler Chatwood pitched well, allowing one run in 5.1 innings. Kris Bryant drove in a run and had three hits, but the Cubs went 1–10 with runners in scoring position and left eight runners on base on the night. For the second consecutive evening, Carl Edwards Jr. gave up the tie-breaking hit to Ronald Acuña Jr. and this time allowed two more runs to score in the bottom of the eighth as the Cubs lost to the Braves 4–1. Albert Almora Jr. continued his stellar defensive play, robbing a home run on a leaping catch at the wall in the second inning.
- **May 17** – The Cubs and Braves were rained out for the second time on the season. The game will be made up on August 30.
- **May 18** – The Cubs returned to Cincinnati to face the Reds four times in three days. The Cubs scored three runs in the first to take the early lead. Addison Russell went 4–4 with a walk in the game while scoring a run and driving in a run. Ian Happ, who went to college at the University of Cincinnati, was intentionally walked three times in the game as the Cubs scored eight runs while Jon Lester allowed only one run in six innings of work in the 8–1 win over the Reds.
- **May 19** – In game one of a day-night doubleheader, Kyle Hendricks surrendered four runs in five innings and left the game trailing 4–2. Raisel Iglesias entered in the eighth for a six-out save for the Reds, but promptly gave up a home run to Ian Happ and an RBI double to Anthony Rizzo as the Cubs tied the game at four. The game went to 11 innings before Justin Wilson walked two and gave up a single to load the bases. He then walked Billy Hamilton on five pitches to force in the winning run as the Cubs fell 5–4. In the nightcap of the doubleheader, Ian Happ homered again for the Cubs while driving in four runs. The homer was the 14,000th in Cubs history. Jason Heyward drove in four runs with a bloop, bases-clearing triple and sacrifice fly. The Cubs routed the Reds, winning 10–0 behind José Quintana's seven innings of one-hit ball.
- **May 20** – In the final game of the four-game series, the Cubs fell behind 1–0 in the first as Yu Darvish struggled mightily in the inning, but only allowed the one run in the inning. The Cubs retook the lead on a two-run homer by Kyle Schwarber and a home run by Javier Báez as the Cubs hit back-to-back home runs for the first time on the season. Ben Zobrist also homered as the Cubs won easily 6–1. Darvish earned his first win as a Cub, allowing only one run in six innings of work. Kyle Schwarber was ejected by home plate umpire John Tumpane in the seventh inning for arguing a called third strike.
- **May 22** – After an off day, the Cubs returned home to face the Cleveland Indians. Tyler Chatwood struggled, walking six and giving up four runs in 2.2 innings. Mike Montgomery, in relief of Chatwood, struggled as well, giving up six runs in 2.1 innings as the Indians jumped out to a 10–0 lead. An Ian Happ pinch hit home run in the ninth averted the shutout, but the Cubs fell 10–1.
- **May 23** – In the final game of the brief series against the Indians, Cleveland rookie pitcher Adam Plutko took a no-hitter into the seventh inning in his second major league start and the Indian bullpen shut down the Cubs. Jon Lester pitched well for the Cubs, giving up only one run in seven innings, but the Cubs fell 1–0.
- **May 25** – The Cubs next welcomed the San Francisco Giants to Wrigley Field for a three-game series. Kyle Hendricks pitched seven strong innings, giving up only one run. Kris Bryant and Ben Zobrist each drove in two runs as the Cubs added four runs in the seventh and another in the eighth to blow open the game and win 6–2.
- **May 26** – With José Quintana on the hill in a rare Saturday night game at Wrigley Field, the Cubs took an early lead on a bases loaded walk and a Kyle Schwarber home run. Quintana quickly gave up the lead allowing four runs and failing to escape the fifth. Javier Báez also homered as the Cubs narrowed the deficit to 5–4, but could not complete the comeback.
- **May 27** – After placing Yu Darvish on the DL, the Cubs moved Tyler Chatwood to their ESPN Sunday Night Baseball start against the Giants. Chatwood continued his season-long struggles, walking five in 2.2 innings before being removed from the game. The bullpen tossed 6.1 scoreless innings of relief and Javier Báez hit a go-ahead three-run home run in the fourth to give the Cubs the 8–3 win.
- **May 28** – After a night game the night before, the Cubs traveled to Pittsburgh to take on the Pirates at 1:35 pm local time. Mike Montgomery started for Yu Darvish who was on the DL and pitched 5.2 innings of two-hit ball and left with a 1–0 lead. The Cub bullpen pitched 3.1 innings of perfect relief as the Cub offense came alive later in the game to blow out the Pirates 7–0. Anthony Rizzo homered in the second and drove in three runs while Addison Russell hit a two-run, pinch-hit home run in the seventh to extend the Cub lead. In the eighth inning with the bases loaded, Rizzo took out Pirate catcher Elías Díaz who was attempting to turn a double play. The takeout slide by Rizzo forced Díaz's throw into right field and allowed two more runs to score. Pirate manager Clint Hurdle was thrown out for arguing that it was an illegal slide after the play was reviewed. Both Díaz and Hurdle stated after the game that they thought the slide was dirty.
- **May 29** – Jon Lester struggled early, giving up three runs in the first two innings as the Cubs fell behind to the Pirates 3–0. Following a Lester single with one out in the fifth, Ben Zobrist homered to cut the lead to one. However, the Pirates pushed the lead to 4–2 in the bottom half of the fifth. In the top of the sixth with two outs, Jason Heyward doubled and Maddon stayed with Lester who singled to score Heyward to cut the Pirate lead to 4–3. Anthony Rizzo, one day removed from his questionable takeout slide at home and who was booed during every at bat, homered in the seventh to tie the game and the Cubs added two more runs on an Ian Happ double and Heyward single. Kyle Schwarber homered in the eighth to push the lead to 8–4. The Cub bullpen allowed two runs in the ninth before Brandon Morrow got his 12 save of the season as the Cubs won 8–6 and moved a season-high seven games over .500.
- **May 30** – Looking to complete the sweep of the Pirates, Kyle Hendricks gave up two runs on seven hits in five innings. The Cubs loaded the bases in the first inning after Javier Báez doubled in Albert Almora Jr. to take an early lead. The Cubs failed to score further and could not manage to push across another run. Leaving 11 runners on base in the game, the Cubs fell 2–1.
- **May 31** – José Quintana pitched six scoreless innings while Ben Zobrist hit a two-run home run as the Cubs visited the New York Mets. The Cub bullpen gave up a solo home run, but Brandon Morrow got his 13th save as the Cubs won 5–1.

==== June ====
- **June 1** – Tyler Chatwood pitched better, going 5.1 innings and allowing two runs, but still walked four and left the game trailing 2–0. Still trailing in the seventh, Kyle Schwarber hit a sacrifice fly to narrow the lead to 2–1. Ben Zobrist followed by doubling in the tying run and Kris Bryant drove in Zobrist to give the Cubs the 3–2 lead. In the eighth, Schwarber hit a three-run homer to extend the lead to 6–2. Brandon Morrow notched his 14th save of the season as the Cubs beat the Mets 6–4.
- **June 2** – Mike Montgomery, making his second consecutive start, again pitched well, allowing one run in six innings of work. The Cub offense only managed one run as well before the game went to extra innings. Luke Farrell pitched five innings of relief, while only giving up two hits. In the 14th, the Cubs blew open the game when Albert Almora Jr. doubled in two runs. Three batters later, Ben Zobrist doubled in two runs as well and Javier Báez hit a pinch-hit two-run home run to give the Cubs the 7–1 win. The Cubs struck out 24 times in the game, but notched their fourth straight win.
- **June 3** – Jon Lester pitched seven innings of shutout ball while the Cubs scored on a Javier Báez steal of home and a Ben Zobrist sacrifice fly. Brian Duensing pitched the ninth for his first save of the year as the Cubs swept the Mets in the four-game series and moved 10 games over .500 on the season.
- **June 5** – After an off day, the Cubs returned home to welcome the Philadelphia Phillies and former Cub pitcher Jake Arrieta to Wrigley Field. Though Arrieta was not scheduled to pitch in the series, the Cubs gave him a video tribute between innings and the crowd cheered him as he came out of the dugout to acknowledge the crowd. In the game, the Cub offense was stymied by Phillies starter Zach Eflin, failing to score until the eighth inning. Meanwhile, Kyle Hendricks struggled for the Cubs, giving up five runs in five innings of work as the Cubs fell 6–1.
- **June 6** – In game two against the Phillies, Anthony Rizzo homered while Willson Contreras and Javier Báez each drove in a run to give the Cubs a 3–0 lead. However, with two on in the sixth, Steve Cishek relieved Cub starter José Quintana and gave up a three-run homer to tie the game. In the ninth, the Phillies homered again, this time off Cub closer Brandon Morrow, to take a 5–3 lead. In the ninth, the Cubs worked the bases loaded and, with two outs and two strikes, Jason Heyward hit his first career walk-off home run, a grand slam, to win the game for the Cubs 7–5. With the win, the Cubs moved to within one game of the division-leading Brewers.
- **June 7** – In the final game of the series against the Phillies, Anthony Rizzo homered again and drove in another run as the Cubs won 4–3. Kris Bryant and Tommy La Stella each drove in a run as well. Brandon Morrow pitched the ninth for his 15th save on the season as the Cubs moved within half a game of the idle Brewers.
- **June 8** – The Pirates returned to Wrigley Field as the Cubs looked to continue their recent hot streak. Mike Montgomery pitched well again in Yu Darvish's spot in the rotation, going six innings while allowing only one run. Ben Zobrist drove in two runs on a single and groundout while Anthony Rizzo drove in a run on a sacrifice fly to give the Cubs the 3–1 win. Kris Bryant led off for the first time in his career and went 3–4 in the game. The win marked the 11th win in the last 14 games for the Cubs as they moved 12 games over .500 on the season.
- **June 9** – The Cubs managed only two runs on six hits, scoring on a groundout by Ben Zobrist and sacrifice fly from Anthony Rizzo in the first inning. However, Jon Lester pitched seven strong innings while giving up only one hit. The Cub bullpen finished the game for Lester without allowing a baserunner as the Cubs retired the last 19 Pirates in the game to win 2–0. The win moved the Cubs 13 games over .500, but they remained half a game behind the Brewers in the division.
- **June 10** – Kyle Hendricks pitched well, but was lifted for a pinch hitter in the fifth inning trailing 1–0. Taking Hendricks out early backfired as the Cub bullpen fell apart, allowing five runs in the sixth as the Cubs lost to the Pirates 7–1. The loss ended the Cubs four game winning streak.
- **June 11** – The following day, the Cubs traveled to Milwaukee to face the division-leading Brewers. José Quintana pitched well, giving up two runs, but left the game with the Cubs trailing 2–1. Following a Ben Zobrist walk to lead off the eighth inning, Jason Heyward singled him home to tie the game at two as the game went in to extra innings with the division lead on the line. In the 11th, Anthony Rizzo homered to lead off the inning and the Cubs scored four more runs on singles by Zobrist and Albert Almora Jr.and a two-run double by Heyward to push the lead to 7–2. The win moved the Cubs into first place in the division for the first time since May 1.
- **June 12** – The Cub offense was unable to score against the Brewers as the Cubs lost 4–0. Tyler Chatwood only walked two batters in five innings, but gave up the four runs on five hits. The loss moved the Cubs back out of first place by half a game.
- **June 13** – After managing only two hits the day before, the Cubs tripled that total, getting six hits in the final game of the series. However, they could not push across a run as they were shut out for the second consecutive day by the Brewers, losing 1–0. Mike Montgomery pitched well for the Cubs, only giving up one run in six innings of work as the Cubs fell 1.5 games out of first place.
- **June 15** – After a day off, the Cubs traveled to St. Louis to face the Cardinals. Jon Lester pitched well for the Cubs, giving up two runs in six innings. The Cubs offense was impressive as Ian Happ, Kyle Schwarber, and Kris Bryant homered (Bryant's homer breaking an 0–16 slump). Bryant drove in four runs in the game while Schwarber drove in three and Albert Almora Jr. drove in two as the Cubs pounded the Cardinals 13–5.
- **June 16** – Addison Russell and Jason Heyward each homered against the Cardinals as Kyle Hendricks pitched six innings and allowed three runs. Brandon Morrow, pitching for the first time in over a week, struggled, giving up two hits in the ninth, but earned the save as the Cubs won 6–3.
- **June 17** – After scoring 19 runs in the first two games of the series against the Cardinals, the Cubs were shutout on Sunday Night Baseball. José Quintana pitched well, giving up two runs in five innings as the Cubs lost 5–0. Javier Báez left the game after getting hit in the elbow by a pitch in the second inning. After the series, the Cubs remained half a game out of first.
- **June 19** – Following a rainout the night before, the Cubs welcomed the Los Angeles Dodgers to Wrigley Field for the first time since the 2017 NLCS. In game one of the day-night doubleheader, the Cubs took a lead into the ninth on RBIs by Anthony Rizzo and Kris Bryant. However, with Brandon Morrow unavailable, Justin Wilson walked the leadoff batter and gave up a pinch-hit two-run double to Kyle Farmer to give up the lead in the ninth as the Cubs lost 4–3. In game two of the doubleheader, Mike Montgomery pitched six innings allowing just one run as the game went into extra innings tied at one. In the bottom of the 10th, Kris Bryant tripled to lead off the inning and Albert Almora Jr. singled to give the Cubs the 2–1 win and split of the doubleheader.
- **June 20** – In the final game of the three-game series against the Dodgers, Jon Lester and Anthony Bass combined to pitch a six-hit shutout. Javier Báez had three hits and scored two runs while Kyle Schwarber hit his 14th home run of the season as the Cubs won 4–0. The win moved the Cubs into a virtual tie with the Brewers pending the result of the Brewers game in Pittsburgh later that evening.
- **June 21** – The following day, the Cubs traveled to Cincinnati to take on the Reds in a virtual tie for first place in the division. Kyle Hendricks pitched five scoreless innings before allowing a run in the sixth inning via a bases-loaded walk. Hendricks left the game and Randy Rosario, who had a 0.60 ERA in 12 appearances for the Cubs, replaced him gave up a grand slam to the first batter he faced, Jesse Winker, which gave the Reds a three-run lead. The Cubs could muster no further runs against the Reds, losing 6–2. With a Brewers win, the Cubs fell to one game out of first.
- **June 22** – José Quintana pitched five innings, giving up nine hits and four runs against the Reds in game two of the series. The Cubs took the lead however in the fourth on a Javier Baez run-scoring single and a Kyle Schwarber two-run homer, but Quintana could not hold the lead and the Cubs lost 6–3. The loss coupled with a Brewers win, moved the Cubs to two games out of first.
- **June 23** – Luke Farrell made his first start for the Cubs who needed a spot start due to the rainout earlier in the week. Farrell gave up three runs in 2.2 innings and Brian Duensing fared no better, giving up a grand slam to Reds starter Anthony DeScalfini putting the Cubs down 8–1. The Cubs went on to lose 11–2, their third straight loss.
- **June 24** – Tyler Chatwood was unable to start as his wife was expected to have their first child, so Mike Montgomery started instead for the Cubs. Montgomery pitched six innings of one-run baseball, allowing only a pinch-hit home run by Reds' pitcher Michael Lorenzen, The Cubs took the lead on a Jason Hewyard two-run double and an Anthony Rizzo two-run homer. Following an Albert Almora Jr. home run in the seventh, the Cubs went to the bottom half leading 6–1 with what appeared to be an easy win to avoid the sweep. However, Montgomery gave up two runs in the bottom half and was replaced by Pedro Strop. Strop allowed the next five batters to reach including a home run by Jesse Winker. The Reds took the lead 8–6 and the Cubs could manage nothing further as they were swept by the Reds. Kris Bryant missed his second straight game due to a shoulder injury.
- **June 25** – Following the four-game sweep by the Reds, the Cubs traveled to Los Angeles to take on the Dodgers. Duane Underwood Jr. was recalled from Iowa to start and make his major-league debut. Underwood pitched well, lasting four innings and allowing only one run. The Cub bullpen pitched well, but Justin Wilson allowed another run in the eighth as the Cubs trailed 2–0 heading to the ninth. Following a one-out single off Dodger closer Kenley Jansen, Ben Zobrist moved to second on a balk and to third on an Anthony Rizzo single. A sacrifice fly by Javier Báez moved the score to 2–1 before Kyle Schwarber grounded out to end the game. The loss marked the Cubs' fifth straight.
- **June 26** – Looking to end their five-game losing streak and doing so without Kris Bryant who was placed on the DL for the first time in his career, Jon Lester pitched five strong innings allowing only two runs. Javier Báez went 4–5 in the game with a double and two home runs including a grand slam in the sixth inning. The Cubs broke out of their slump, scoring nine runs to defeat the Dodgers 9–4. The Cubs remained 2.5 games out of first with the win.
- **June 27** – Kyle Hendricks struggled, pitching only 2.2 innings while giving up six runs on eight hits. The Cubs were able to narrow the lead as Willson Contreras drove in four runs, but the Cubs could not muster enough offense to make up for Hendricks' poor performance and lost 7–5. The loss moved the Cubs to 1–6 on their eight-game road trip.
- **June 28** – In the final game of the four-game series against the Dodgers, the Cubs struggled against Dodger pitcher Clayton Kershaw who was making his second start off the DL. Kershaw allowed only one run in his five innings and left with a 3–1 lead. José Quintana pitched 5.1 innings for the Cubs, giving up three runs and seven hits. With Kershaw out of the game in the sixth inning, the Cubs took advantage as Alberta Almora Jr. homered and Addison Russell drove in the tying run on a sacrifice fly. In the seventh, the Cubs blew the game open as Jason Heyward doubled in the go-ahead run, Almora drove in another, and Anthony Rizzo, who had four hits on the day, hit a bases-clearing double to move the lead to 8–3. A Russell two-run homer ended the scoring in the seven-run seventh inning and the Cubs went on to win 11–5.
- **June 29** – The Cubs welcomed the Minnesota Twins to Wrigley Field with temperatures in the 90s and the wind blowing out. The Cubs homered four times including a grand slam by Addison Russell which gave the Cubs the lead for good. Joe Mauer homered twice for the Twins and drove in five runs, but it was not enough as the Cubs pounded out 10 runs on 12 hits. Mike Montgomery gave up five runs in five innings, but earned the win as the Cubs won 10–6.
- **June 30** – With the weather remaining hot and the wind continuing to blow out, the Cubs again fell behind early to the Twins. Trailing 7–4 in the fifth, the Cubs exploded for five runs to take the lead and added another five runs in the seventh to win 14–9. The Cubs mustered 20 hits in the game, but only three extra base hits, all doubles, to overcome the Twins and win their third straight game.

==== July ====
- **July 1** – Looking for the sweep with the wind still blowing out, Jon Lester pitched five innings while allowing four runs, only two earned. He also gave the Cubs the lead in the second with a three-run homer. The Cub offense continued its hot streak, scoring 11 runs and taking an 11–5 lead into the eighth. However, reliever Dillon Maples gave up five runs in the eighth to narrow the lead to one before Brandon Morrow came in to finish off the Twins with a four-out save. Lester earned his NL-leading 11th win on the season. The 11–10 win moved the Cubs back within half a game of first place Milwaukee.
- **July 3** – After an off day, the Cubs welcomed the Detroit Tigers to Wrigley. Kyle Hendricks struggled early for the Cubs, giving up three runs and was only able to get through five innings. Trailing 3–0, the Cubs scored three on three doubles by Tommy La Stella, Albert Almora Jr., and Jason Heyward and a single by Anthony Rizzo. Rizzo drove in his second run of the game on a groundout in the bottom of the seventh to give the Cubs the lead. A Kyle Schwarber homer in the eighth extend the lead to 5–3 and Pedro Strop earned the save as the Cubs won their fifth in a row.
- **July 4** – In the final game of the brief two-game series against the Tigers, José Quintana pitched the Cubs' first quality start since June 21, going six innings and allowing only two runs. Javier Báez stole home for the second time on the season and Willson Contreras drove in three runs on a double and a solo home run to give the Cubs the 5–2 win. The win marked the Cubs' season-high sixth straight win on the season as they stayed within one game of the first-place Brewers.
- **July 6** – After another off day, the Reds made their first trip to Wrigley Field on the season. Mike Montgomery allowed three runs in five innings of work, but the Cub offense couldn't muster much against Reds' starter Tyler Mahle. With the Cubs trailing 3–1 in the eighth, the Reds went to their closer Rasiel Iglesias for a five-out save. The Cubs were able to score one run in the eighth and had runners on in the ninth, but failed to score, ending their six-game winning streak with the 3–2 loss.
- **July 7** – Tyler Chatwood continued his struggles for the Cubs, giving up seven runs in 5.2 innings of work. However, Randy Rosario pitched 2.1 innings of shutout relief and drove in a run with a single in the sixth to keep the Cubs in the game. Trailing 7–4 in the bottom of the eighth, the Cubs scored four runs to take the lead on a two-RBI double by Ben Zobrist, a run-scoring single by Javier Báez, and an RBI groundout by Addison Russell. Brandon Morrow pitched the ninth to secure the 8–7 win over the Reds.
- **July 8** – In the series finale against the Reds, the Cubs took the early lead as Addison Russell drove in two runs with a double in the second. However, Jon Lester surrendered the lead on a Eugenio Suarez two-run homer. Russell would drive in another run on a groundout to tie the game at three. However, the Reds' Billy Hamilton would retake the lead on a steal of second, advancing to third on a throwing error by Willson Contreras, and scoring on a throwing error by Albert Almora Jr. Still trailing in the seventh, Javier Báez drove in two on a single and a good baserunning play by Jason Heyward to give the Cubs the 5–4 lead. Brandon Morrow surrendered a home run to the first batter he faced in the ninth to blow only his second save on the season. The Cubs loaded the bases with one out in the ninth, but could not push across a run. In the 10th, the Cubs again loaded the bases, this time without a hit on two walks and an error by the Reds' Joey Votto. David Bote then walked to force in the winning run, marking the Cubs' ninth win in their prior 11 games.
- **July 9** – The Cubs traveled to San Francisco to take on the Giants and sent struggling Kyle Hendricks to the mound. Hendricks pitched a masterful game, going 8.1 innings while allowing only one run, but left with the game tied in the ninth at one. Anthony Rizzo committed two errors in the same inning that led to the Giants first run while Pablo Sandoval drove in the winning run with a bases loaded single in the 11th to win the game for the Giants. Meanwhile, Kris Bryant played in a minor league rehab game for the first time since being placed on the DL on June 26 and homered while driving in three runs.
- **July 10** – José Quintana pitched six innings of shutout ball, but left with the score tied at zero. In the seventh, Addison Russell doubled, advanced to third on a wild pitch, and scored on a throwing error by Giants' catcher Nick Hundley as Russell attempted to advance on the wild pitch. Victor Caratini doubled to drive in Ian Happ three batters later to give the Cubs a 2–0 lead. The Cubs' bullpen shut out the Giants and Steve Cishek earned his third save of the season as the Cubs won 2–0.
- **July 11** – In the final game of the series against the Giants, Mike Montgomery gave up four runs in the first inning, but the Cubs came back to tie on three home runs: solo homers by Javier Báez and Jason Heyward and a two-run shot by Kris Bryant in his return from the DL. In the 13th inning, Buster Posey singled off the wall in right to drive in the winning run for the Giants as the Cubs lost 5–4. With a Brewers loss later in the day, the Cubs remained a game and a half out of first place.
- **July 13** – After an off day, the Cubs traveled to San Diego to take on the Padres. Tyler Chatwood gave up three runs in five innings of work, but left with the score tied at three. The Padres retook the lead in the bottom of the eighth on an RBI single by Austin Hedges. In the ninth, Anthony Rizzo, who batted leadoff in the game, doubled with two outs to drive in the tying run. In the 10th, Javier Báez singled and stole second, advancing to third on a throwing error by Hedges and scored on a throwing error by Padre centerfielder Travis Jankowski. Brandon Morrow pitched the ninth to earn the save as the Cubs won 5–4.
- **July 14** – In game two of the series, Kyle Hendricks pitched five innings while allowing two runs. Meanwhile, the Cub offense scored 11 runs, three each in the eighth and ninth, to give the Cubs the 11–6 win. Javier Báez homered and drove in five runs while Ian Happ and Kyle Schwarber also homered in the easy win. Combined with a doubleheader loss by the Brewers earlier in the day, the Cubs moved a game and a half up on the Brewers in sole possession of first place.
- **July 15** – Jon Lester pitched five plus innings while allowing three runs in the last game before the All-Star break. The Cub offense gave Lester an early 5–0 lead and the Cubs coasted from there. Jason Heyward drove in two runs as the Cubs swept the Padres 7–4. The win moved the Cubs to a division lead of 2.5 games over the Brewers who lost their sixth game in a row. The Cubs entered the All-Star break with the best record in the National League at 55–38 and the largest division lead.
- **July 19** – Following the All-Star break, the Cardinals visited Wrigley Field for a five-game series. In game one of the series, Kyle Hendricks gave up three runs and nine hits in 4.2 innings and left trailing 3–1. However, Jason Heyward and Ben Zobrist drove in two runs each and Ian Happ hit a two-run homer to give the Cubs the lead. Victor Caratini went three for three with an RBI and three runs scored as the Cubs held on for a 9–6 win. Pedro Strop earned the save by throwing two pitches in the ninth as the Cubs moved to three games ahead of the idle Brewers in the division. Prior to the game, the Cubs placed closer Brandon Morrow on the disabled list. After the game, it was announced that the Cubs had acquired reliever Jesse Chavez from the Texas Rangers.
- **July 20** – Jon Lester failed to get out of the fourth inning while allowing eight runs as the Cubs were blown out by the Cardinals 18–5. Victor Caratini, Ian Happ, and Tommy La Stella each pitched at least an inning in the game as the Cubs looked to save their bullpen for the doubleheader the next day. Cardinals first baseman Matt Carpenter went 5–5 with three home runs, two doubles, and seven RBIs becoming only the second player ever to have three homers and two doubles in a game. However, the Cubs maintained their first place lead of three games over the Brewers as Milwaukee lost their seventh straight game.
- **July 21** – In game one of a doubleheader, Tyler Chatwood walked six, but only gave up one run in 5.1 innings of work and left with the Cubs ahead 3–1. Ben Zobrist went 4–4 while Javier Báez and Tommy La Stella drove in two runs each as the Cubs pulled away for the 7–2 win over the Cardinals. In game two, the Cubs fell behind early, but Mike Montgomery lasted six innings while allowing only one run and left with a 3–1 lead. The Cub bullpen could not hold the lead this time, giving up a run in the eighth and three in the ninth as the Cubs fell 6–3. Báez and Joe Maddon were ejected after Báez was called out on a check swing in the fifth and Anthony Rizzo continued his hot hitting while batting leadoff, going 4–5 in the loss.
- **July 22** – In the final game of the five-game series against the Cardinals, the Cubs again fell behind early. However, José Quintana pitched seven innings and only allowed two runs while the Cub offense was forced to come from behind again. Anthony Rizzo continued his hot hitting while batting leadoff, going 2–3 and driving in a run. Willson Contreras drove in two while Kyle Schwarber hit his 19th home run of the season as the Cubs pulled away for the 7–2 win. The win moved the Cubs 3.5 games ahead of the Brewers in the NL Central.
- **July 23** – After playing five games in four days, the Cubs needed a spot start from Luke Farrell as the Arizona Diamondbacks came to Wrigley. Farrell struggled, allowing five runs in the first and being forced from the game in the fourth. Trailing 7–1 in the eighth, the Cubs again turned to position players to provide some relief for the bullpen as Victor Caratini pitched an inning and, with two outs in the ninth, Anthony Rizzo faced the last D-Backs batter. The loss, coupled with a Brewer win, reduced the Cubs' division lead to 2.5 games.
- **July 24** – In game two of the series against the D-Backs, the Cubs only managed a Jason Heyward solo home run. Kyle Hendricks allowed three runs in five innings as the Cubs lost their second in a row, losing 5–1. The loss further reduced the Cubs' division lead to 1.5 games.
- **July 25** – With their division lead narrowing, Jon Lester pitched six innings and allowed only one run before being removed from the game in the seventh. The Cubs' offense again struggled to score as the game was tied at one in the eighth. Back-to-back errors by the Diamondbacks resulted in a run for the Cubs in the bottom of the eighth and Pedro Strop pitched the ninth to nail down the 2–1 win. The win and a Brewers loss moved the Cubs division lead back to 2.5 games with one more game remaining against the D-Backs. Kris Bryant sat out his second straight game with continued shoulder soreness that had put him on the DL earlier in the season.
- **July 26** – In the last game of the series, the Cubs fell behind the D-backs 6–1 following a Nick Ahmed grand slam. Trailing 6–4 in the bottom of the ninth, David Bote, in the lineup after Kris Bryant was placed on the DL, homered following a Ben Zobrist pinch-hit walk to tie the game at six. Anthony Rizzo followed with a long home run to right field to win the game 7–6.
- **July 27** – Travelling to St. Louis, the Cubs took the lead in the third on an Anthony Rizzo home run, but Mike Montgomery quickly gave up the lead, surrendering five runs in the next two innings. Javier Báez homered in the fifth, but it was not enough as the Cubs fell 5–2. The loss reduced the Cubs' division lead to 1.5 games.
- **July 28** – José Quintana gave up six runs in the first inning, including a grand slam by Marcell Ozuna as the Cubs lost to the Cardinals 6–2. The loss and a Brewers' win left the Cubs' division lead at half a game.
- **July 29** – Following a rain delay of about 90 minutes, the Cubs took a lead in the first on a Ben Zobrist home run. The Cardinals took the lead in the bottom half of the first with a two-run homer by Marcell Ozuna. Anthony Rizzo homered to straight away center in the third to tie the game at two. In the fifth, Zobrist doubled to move Rizzo to third before Jason Heyward hit a grounder to second which was bobbled and allowed the tying run to score. Javier Báez then drove in Zobrist and Heyward with a double to extend the lead to 5–2. Kyle Hendricks pitched seven innings while allowing only two runs and Pedro Strop pitched the ninth as the Cubs won 5–2. The win moved the Cubs' division lead back to 1.5 games.
- **July 31** – Following an off day, the Cubs traveled to Pittsburgh to take on the Pirates. Jon Lester gave up three runs in the third, but Javier Báez hit his 22nd home run of the season, a three-run shot, to tie it in the fourth. Lester, however, gave up the lead in the fifth and left the game after five innings trailing 4–3. Justin Wilson allowed an eighth inning homer to push the lead to 5–3. Addison Russell doubled in a run in the top of the ninth, but was thrown out at third trying to extend the double to a triple. The Cubs failed to score again and lost 5–4. The loss coupled with a Brewers' win resulted in a tie at the top of the NL Central.

==== August ====
- **August 1** – Cole Hamels, who was acquired at the trade deadline, made his Cub debut against the Pirates in Pittsburgh and allowed one run in five innings of work. Javier Báez was on base five times and drove in a run while Willson Contreras homered and drove in three. The Cubs took a 4–0 lead in the first and led 6–1 a few innings later as they routed the Pirates 9–2. Hamels got the win in his first Cub appearance and Brandon Kintzler made his first Cub appearance as well. The Cubs moved one game ahead of the Brewers in the division with the win and a Brewers' loss.
- **August 2** – With the Padres in town, Jesse Chavez gave up his first runs as a Cub, surrendering a three-run home run to Padres catcher Austin Hedges in the sixth and the Cub bullpen surrendered three more runs. The Cub offense only mustered one run and the Cubs lost 6–1. However, with a Brewers' loss as well, the Cubs remained in first place.
- **August 3** – In game two of a four-game series against the Padres, José Qunitana pitched six innings and allowed only one run. Javier Báez and Anthony Rizzo homered and Ben Zobrist drove in two runs as the Cubs led 5–2 in the ninth. Pedro Strop allowed two runs in the top of the ninth, but earned the save as the Cubs won 5–4. The Cubs maintained their one-game division lead as the Brewers also won on the day.
- **August 4** – Kyle Schwarber and Anthony Rizzo each homered in a five-run second inning to give Kyle Hendricks a 5–0 lead. Hendricks, pitching into the sixth, allowed four runs, but the Cub bullpen shut out the Padres to preserve the 5–4 win. The Cubs' division lead again remained at one game.
- **August 5** – In the final game of the four-game series against the Padres, the Cubs fell behind early, but tied it in the seventh. However, Carl Edwards Jr. gave up the lead in the eighth and the Padres added four in the ninth to beat the Cubs 10–6. Javier Báez and Ben Zobrist each homered in the loss, but the Cubs remained one game ahead of the Brewers.
- **August 6** – The Cubs next traveled to Kansas City to take on the Royals. Javier Bez went 2–4 with a homer, double, and two RBI. Cole Hamels pitched six innings while allowing only one run in his second start with the Cubs to earn the win. Pedro Strop earned the save as the Cubs defeated the Royals 3–1 and moved their division lead to 1.5 games.
- **August 7** – Mike Montgomery pitched into the seventh inning while allowing no runs. David Bote drove in three of the Cubs five runs as the Cubs shut out the Royals 5–0. Coupled with a Brewers' loss, the Cubs moved to 2.5 games ahead of Milwaukee in the division.
- **August 8** – The Cub offense struggled in the final game of the series against the Royals failing to score a run. José Quintana struggled as well, giving up five runs in 6.1 innings as the Cubs lost 9–0. The loss reduced the Cubs' division lead to 1.5 games.
- **August 10** – Returning home after an off day, the Washington Nationals took an early 2–0 lead off of Kyle Hendricks. The Cubs went without a hit for 5.2 innings, but Jason Heyward got the first Cub hit on a single with the bases loaded in the sixth to score two runs and tie the game at two. In the seventh, Anthony Rizzo coaxed a walk with the bases loaded to drive in the Cubs' third run of the game and give the Cubs the 3–2 lead. Pedro Strop earned the save as the Cubs moved three games ahead of the Brewers in the division.
- **August 11** – Jon Lester continued his struggles, giving up eight runs in 3.2 innings as the Cubs were routed by the Nationals 9–4. The Cubs' division lead was reduced to two games.
- **August 12** – In the finale of the series, Cole Hamels pitched seven innings, giving up only one run and striking out nine. However, Nationals' pitcher Max Scherzer was just as good, allowing no runs in seven innings. Leading 1–0 in the ninth, the Nationals extended their lead to 3–0 off the Cub bullpen. In the bottom half of the ninth, Jason Heyward reached on an infield single and Albert Almora Jr and Willson Contreras were hit by pitches to load the bases with two outs. David Bote pinch-hit and, with a 2–2 count, homered to straight away center field for the game-winning ultimate grand slam. The win moved the Cubs' lead to three games in the division.
- **August 14** – After an off day, the Cubs welcomed the second-place Brewers to town for a short two-game series. José Quintana was rocked, allowing five runs and three home runs in five innings. The Cub offense again struggled as they were shutout 7–0. Ben Zobrist was ejected for arguing balls and strikes, marking his first career ejection. Joe Maddon was also ejected from the game for arguing balls and strikes. The loss moved the Brewers to within two games of the Cubs.
- **August 15** – Anthony Rizzo returned to the cleanup spot and hit a two-run homer in the first to give the Cubs an early 2–0 lead. Rizzo drove in three runs in the game and Jason Heyward drove in two as the Cubs beat the Brewers 8–4. Kyle Hendicks pitched well, but allowed four runs in six innings of work. The win returned the Cubs' lead to three games over Milwaukee.
- **August 16** – Jon Lester pitched six scoreless innings as the Cubs shut out the Pirates in Pittsburgh 1–0. Ian Happ homered for the only run of the game as three Cub relievers kept the shutout intact. The win was the Cubs' 70th on the season, moved the Cubs to 20 games over .500 for the first time on the season, and extended the division lead to 3.5 games.
- **August 17** – Cole Hamels pitched seven shutout innings and Kyle Schwarber homered as the Cubs beat the Pirates 1–0 for the second consecutive game. The Cubs tied a Major League record by turning seven double plays in the game. The win extended the Cubs' division lead to a season-high 4.5 games and moved a season-high 21 games over .500.
- **August 18** – Tyler Chatwood got the start after Mike Montgomery went the disabled list, but lasted only two-plus innings while walking three and allowing three runs. For the third consecutive game, the Cubs only managed to score on a solo home run, this time by Ben Zobrist. As a result, the Cubs lost 3–1 and saw the Cardinals move into second place, only four games out.
- **August 19** – José Quintana pitched five innings while allowing only one run. The Cubs scored their only run on a solo home run by Kyle Schwarber, the fourth straight game scoring only on a lone solo home run. However, the game went to extra innings before the Pirates won it on a walk off home run off of Cubs' pitcher Brandon Kintzler. The Cubs' division lead moved to 3.5 games as the Brewers returned to second place with a win over the Cardinals.
- **August 21** – After an off day, the Cubs visited the Detroit Tigers. For an MLB-record fifth straight game, the Cubs scored their only rum on a solo home run, this time by Anthony Rizzo. Kyle Hendricks gave up two runs while pitching seven innings and the Cubs lost their third straight game, losing 2–1. The loss reduced the Cubs division lead to two games over the Cardinals. Earlier in the day, the Cubs traded a minor league prospect to the Washington Nationals for 2B Daniel Murphy.
- **August 22** – After five straight games of only scoring on a solo home run, David Bote hit a two-run home run and Javier Báez hit a three-run shot as the Cub offense woke up to score eight runs. Jon Lester pitched 5.2 innings and allowed only one run as the Cubs beat the Tigers 8–2. Anthony Rizzo also homered for the Cubs as their division lead remained at two games.
- **August 23** – The Cubs returned home to take on the Reds. Cole Hamels pitched a complete game, the Cubs first of the year, allowing only one run as the Cubs blew out the Reds 7–1. Anthony Rizzo homered and drove in three runs while Javier Báez also homered and Victor Caratini drove in two runs as the Cubs won easily.
- **August 24** – Alec Mills was recalled from AAA Iowa to make the start and pitched well, going 5.2 innings while allowing only one run. Newly acquired Daniel Murphy hit his first home run as a Cub in the bottom of the eighth to give the Cubs a 2–1 lead. However, Pedro Strop gave up a game-tying home run in the ninth. In the bottom of the 10th, David Bote homered to give the Cubs the 3–2 walk-off win over the Reds.
- **August 25** – Jose Quintana pitched five innings and allowed two runs, but left with a 6–2 lead against the Reds. Daniel Murphy, Kyle Schwarber, and Javier Báez all homered as the Cubs put the game out of reach in the seventh, taking a 10–2 lead. Brandon Kintzler allowed two two-run homers in the eighth to narrow the lead, but the Cubs held on to win 10–6.
- **August 26** – Kyle Hendricks pitched seven shutout innings and the Cub offense erupted for a nine runs on homers by David Bote and Kyle Schwarber. The 9–0 win over the Reds marked the first four-game sweep of the Reds since 1945.
- **August 27** – The New York Mets visited Wrigley while Jon Lester gave up three runs in six innings and left with a 4–3 lead. Anthony Rizzo homered and drove in two runs while Lester added a two-run single. Steve Cishek gave up a game-tying homer, but the Cub offenses continued its hot hitting and extended the lead to 7–4. The Mets loaded the bases in the ninth, but Eddie Chavez finished off the game as the Cubs won 7–4. With the Cardinals and Brewers off, the Cubs' division lead moved to 4.5 games over the Cardinals and five over the Brewers.
- **August 28** – Cy Young candidate Jacob deGrom pitched eight innings for the Mets and allowed only one run while Cole Hames pitched five innings allowing no runs. However the game was tied at one after nine before the game was suspended due to rain.
- **August 29** – In the continuation of the previous night's game, Ben Zobrist drove in the winning run in the 11th to win the game 2–1, marking the Cubs seventh straight win. In the normally scheduled game for the day, the Mets pounded out 10 runs as they blew out the Cubs 10–3 ending the Cubs winning streak.
- **August 30** – In a makeup of a previously rained out game, the Cubs traveled to Atlanta to take on the Braves. Mike Montgomery, coming off the DL, gave up four runs in 4.1 innings and left trailing 4–3 However Tommy La Stella hit his first home run of the year, a pinch-hit two-run homer to put the Cubs in front 5–4. The Cub bullpen shut out the Braves for the remainder of the game as the Cubs won again.
- **August 31** – The Cubs next traveled to face the Phillies. Javier Baez homered in the fifth to give the Cubs a lead, but Jose Quintana gave up the lead in the sixth. Tied at one, the game went to extra innings where Brandon Kintzler game up a walk-off home run to Asdrubal Cabrera as the Cubs lost 2–1.

==== September/October ====
- **September 1** – Kyle Hendricks pitched six innings and allowed one run while the Cub offense scored seven runs. Kyle Schwarber drove in two runs and Ian Happ homered as the Cubs won easily 7–1.
- **September 2** – Facing Cy Young candidate Aaron Nola, the Cubs pounded out three solo home runs while Jon Lester silenced the Phillies' bats. Lester pitched six shutout innings as the Cub offense added on against the Phillie bullpen giving the Cubs tan 8–0 lead. Brandon Kintzler gave up the shutout in the ninth, but the Cubs won 8–1. The win moved the Cubs' division lead to five games over the Brewers and 5.5 games over the Cardinals.
- **September 3** – Cole Hamels pitched five innings while allowing two unearned runs. Trailing 2–1 in the eighth, Anthony Rizzo hit a two-run home run to give the Cubs a 3–2 lead. However, Carl Edwards Jr. walked in a run in the eighth and the Brewers scored the game-winner in the ninth with a bases loaded ground ball on which Kris Bryant tried to turn a double play, but could not get the final out. The loss moved the Cubs' division lead to four games over the Brewers.
- **September 4** – Mike Montgomery gave up five hits and walked three while allowing two runs in only four innings of work. The Cub bullpen fared much worse, allowing nine runs in four innings as the Brewers routed the Cubs 11–1. The loss reduced the Cubs' division lead to three games over the Brewers.
- **September 5** – In the final game of the series against the Brewers, Jose Quintana pitched 6.2 innings while allowing only two runs. Ben Zobrist and Daniel Murphy each had three hits as Murphy and Kyle Schwarber homered to take a 6–1 lead. The bullpen continued its recent struggles, allowing two runs in the seventh to narrow the lead to 6–4, but the Cubs held on for the win. The win moved the Cubs' division lead to four games.
- **September 6** – The Cubs next traveled to Washington to face the Nationals. Kyle Hendricks started well, but ended up giving up four runs in five innings and left trailing 4–3. Willson Contreras drove in the tying run in the eighth and the game went to extra innings. In the 10th, David Bote continued his clutch hitting against the Nationals, doubling in the go-ahead run while Taylor Davis drove in an insurance run as the Cubs won their second straight game 6–4. With the Brewers off, the Cubs' division lead moved to 4.5 games.
- **September 7** – After two innings of scoreless ball, the game against the Nationals was washed out by rain to be made up the next day as a doubleheader.
- **September 8** – Due to the previous day's rain out, the Cubs started newly acquired Jaime García against the Nationals. After a rain delay before the game, García only lasted one-third of an inning and allowed three runs. The Cubs committed three errors in the game as the Nationals blew out the Cubs 10–3. In game two of the doubleheader, the Cubs took a 4–1 lead in the fifth off a Victor Caratini grand slam. However, the Cub bullpen again struggled, giving up a two-run homer to Bryce Harper as the Nationals retook the lead 6–5 in the seventh. After another rain delay, the Cubs could not come back, losing again. With a Brewers' win, the Cubs division lead narrowed to 2.5 games.
- **September 9** – Following yet another rain delay, the final game of the series was postponed to September 13. The series experienced over 10 hours of rain delays on the weekend. With a win by the Brewers, the division lead was reduced to two games.
- **September 10** – With the Cubs' lead narrowing, the Cubs welcomed the Brewers to Wrigley Field for a three-game series. In game one, Jon Lester allowed three runs in 5.2 innings of work and left trailing 3–2. The Cub offense managed only five hits and lost 3–2 narrowing the division lead to one game
- **September 11** – In game two, Jose Quintana continued his strong pitching against the Brewers pitching 6.2 innings of shutout ball while the Cub bullpen also held the Brewers scoreless. Victor Caratini drove in two runs as the Cubs won 3–0. The win returned the Cubs' division lead to two games.
- **September 12** – In the final game of the series, Kyle Hendricks pitched well, allowing only two runs in five innings, but the Cub offense managed only one run. The Brewers scored three more runs of a tired Cub bullpen to notch the 5–1 win and reduce the division lead to one game once again.
- **September 13** – In a makeup game against the Nationals in Washington with Hurricane Florence bearing down on the East Coast, the Cubs, who had sought to have the game moved to the end of the season, fell behind early as Mike Mongtomery lasted only four innings. However, Javier Báez drove in three runs including the winning run in the 10th inning as the Cubs came from behind to earn a 4–3 win. Baez homered, doubled, and drove in the winning run on a bunt single as he strengthened his MVP resume. However, Pedro Strop left the game with a hamstring injury after batting in the 10th. The win moved the Cubs' division lead to 1.5 games with the Brewers idle.
- **September 14** – The Cubs returned home to face the Reds for the final time on the season. Cole Hamels pitched 6.2 innings, giving up eight hits and two runs, and left trailing 2–0. However, once Reds' starter Matt Harvey left the games, the Cubs took the lead on an Ian Happ three-run home run. Jorge De La Rosa pitched the ninth to earn his first career save as the Cubs won. A Brewers' win resulted in the Cubs' division lead remaining at 1.5 games.
- **September 15** – In game two against the Reds, Jon Lester pitched seven shutout innings while the Cub bullpen held the Reds scoreless for the rest of the game. Willson Contreras drove in the only run of the game with a single in the sixth inning as the Cubs won 1–0. A Brewers' loss extended the division lead to 2.5 games.
- **September 16** – In the final game of the series against the Reds, the Cubs' offense continued its struggles, scoring only one run. Jose Quintana pitched five innings and allowed two runs as the Cubs lost 2–1. However, with a loss by the Brewers, the division lead remained at 2.5 games.
- **September 17** – The Cubs next traveled across the country to take on the Arizona Diamondbacks. Kyle Hendricks shut down the struggling D-Backs, allowing only one run in 8.2 innings of work. Javier Baez delivered the big hit for the Cubs, a two-run home run in the sixth to give the Cubs a 3–0 lead. Kris Bryan also hit a two-run home run, his first since July, as the Cubs won 5–1. The win, coupled with a Brewers loss, moved the division lead to 3.5 games and reduced the Cubs magic number to 11.
- **September 18** – The Cub offense came alive in the second game against the D-Backs, as Javier Baez hit a two-run home run in the first inning, following a 17-pitch at-bat by Anthony Rizzo. The Cubs added six more runs on a homer by Daniel Murphy and RBIs by Rizzo, Albert Almora Jr., Willson Contreras, and Ian Happ. The win reduced the Cubs magic number to 10, but the division lead remained at 3.5 games with a Brewers' win.
- **September 19** – Cole Hamels gave up seven runs in six innings as the Cubs were blown out 9–0.
- **September 21** – After their first scheduled off day in more than three weeks, the Cubs traveled across town to face the White Sox. Jose Quintana gave up six runs in five innings of work against his former team as the Cubs were blown out for the second straight game, losing 10–4.
- **September 22** – In game two against the White Sox, Jon Lester allowed three runs, two earned in five innings as Javier Baez drove in three runs while Ben Zobrist drove in two. The Cub bullpen did not allow a run in the game as the Cubs won 8–3.
- **September 23** – In their final road game of the season, Kyle Hendricks pitched 7.2 innings while allowing only one run. Kyle Schwarber homered and drove in two as the Cubs took an early 6–0 lead, as the Cubs beat the Sox 6–1.
- **September 24** – The Pirates came to Chicago and continued to baffle the Cubs' offense, winning easily 6–1. Cole Hamels gave up three runs in six innings while the bullpen surrendered three more runs. The loss, combined with a Brewers' win, reduced the Cubs' division lead to 1.5 games.
- **September 25** – The Cub offense again struggled against the Pirates, failing to score as they were shut out 6–0. Mike Montgomery gave up five runs in four innings as the Cubs' division lead narrowed to half a game over the Brewers.
- **September 26** – The Cub offense finally broke out against the Pirates as they took an early 6–1 lead on a two-run home run by Jason Heyward. However, the Cub bullpen could not hold a 6–2 lead as the Pirates tied it at six in the 9th. In the 10th, Albert Almora Jr. drove in the winning run with a two-out single to give the Cubs a 7–6 win. The win kept the Cubs half a game ahead of the Brewers with four games left in the season.
- **September 27** – With the Brewers off, the Cubs pushed their division lead to one game as Jon Lester pitched six innings of scoreless baseball. The Cub bullpen also held the Pirates scoreless as David Bote drove in two run with a triple. As a result, the Cubs won 3–0 to extend their division lead to a full game.
- **September 28** – The Cardinals next came to town for the final series of the season. With Kyle Hendricks on the mound, the Cubs jumped out to an early lead an RBI single by Anthony Rizzo and error by the Cardinals which allowed another run to score. Kris Bryant, returning to the lineup after being hit by a pitch in the hand a few days earlier homered to extend the Cub lead. Hendricks went eight innings, allowing two runs as the Cubs won easily 8–4. A Brewers' win later in the day left the division lead at one.
- **September 29** – In game two of the series, the Cubs took an early lead in the first on another error by the Cardinals. Cole Hamels surrendered runs in the fourth and fifth and left trailing 2–1. The Cubs offense managed nothing further as the Cubs lost. A Brewers' win later in the day moved the teams into a tie for the division lead with one game remaining.
- **September 30** – Needing to win to at least force a tiebreaker game for the division, the Cubs fell behind early as Mike Montgomery gave up two runs in the first and left in the third inning. The Cubs tied it in the third on a triple by Ben Zobrist to knock in Daniel Murphy. Zobrist then scored on a wild pitch to tie the game. After a walk to Javier Baez, Anthony Rizzo doubled to score Baez and give the Cubs the 3–2 lead. Jason Heyward then drove in Rizzo with a groundout following an intentional walk to Kris Bryant to extend the lead to 4–2. Two innings later, Bryant drove in two on a double and Willson Contreras homered to give the Cubs an 8–2 lead. The Cubs coasted from there, winning 10–5. However, the Brewers also won their game to remain tied atop the standings, meaning the Cubs and Brewers would play a tiebreaker game the next day.
- **October 1** – The Cubs hosted the Brewers in tiebreaker game in which the winner would be NL Central champions and the loser would play in the Wild Card Game. The Cubs offense only managed one run, an Anthony Rizzo homer, as they lost to the Brewers 3–1.

=== Transactions ===
==== March ====
March 29	Claimed RHP Cory Mazzoni off waivers from Los Angeles Dodgers and optioned to Iowa Cubs.

==== April ====
April 9	Placed 1B Anthony Rizzo (back) on 10-day DL retroactive to April 6.
April 10	Selected the contract of 1B Efrén Navarro from Iowa Cubs.
April 15	Optioned 1B Efrén Navarro to Iowa Cubs.
April 17	Activated 1B Anthony Rizzo from 10-day DL.
April 20	Placed RHP Eddie Butler (groin) on 10-day DL. Recalled RHP Luke Farrell from Iowa Cubs.
April 21	Placed OF/IF Ben Zobrist (back) on 10-day DL retroactive to April 18. Recalled IF David Bote from Iowa Cubs.
April 28	Activated OF/IF Ben Zobrist from 10-day DL, optioned IF David Bote to Iowa Cubs.

==== May ====
May 7	Recalled RHP Cory Mazzoni from Iowa Cubs, optioned RHP Luke Farrell to Iowa Cubs. Placed RHP Yu Darvish (flu) on 10-day DL retroactive to May 4.
May 8	Recalled RHP Jen-Ho Tseng from Iowa Cubs. Placed OF Jason Heyward on 7-day concussion DL, recalled IF David Bote from Iowa. LHP Rob Zastryzny recalled from Iowa, RHP Cory Mazzoni optioned to Iowa.
May 9	Optioned RHP Jen-Ho Tseng and LHP Rob Zastryzny to Iowa Cubs. Recalled OF Mark Zagunis and selected the contract of RHP Justin Hancock from Iowa.
May 15	RHP Yu Darvish activated from DL, OF Mark Zagunis optioned to Iowa.
May 17	IF David Bote optioned to Iowa, LHP Randy Rosario was recalled from Iowa.
May 18	LHP Randy Rosario optioned to Iowa. OF Jason Heyward activated from 7-day DL.
May 19	LHP Randy Rosario recalled from Iowa as 26th man for doubleheader.
May 26	Selected contract of C Chris Gimenez from Iowa. Efrén Navarro designated for assignment. RHP Yu Darvish (triceps) placed on 10-day DL, LHP Randy Rosaro recalled.
May 28	Optioned RHP Justin Hancock to Iowa, RHP Luke Farrell recalled.
May 30	RHP Carl Edwards Jr. placed on 10-day DL (right shoulder), RHP Cory Mazzoni recalled from Iowa.

==== June ====
June 11	RHP Cory Mazzoni optioned to Iowa, Cubs select contract of RHP Anthony Bass from Iowa. RHP Eddie Butler moved to 60-day DL.
June 18	LHP Brian Duensing placed on bereavement list, LHP Rob Zastryzny recalled from Iowa.
June 19	RHP Justin Hancock recalled from Iowa as 26th man for doubleheader.
June 20	RHP Brandon Morrow placed on 10-day DL retroactive to June 17, RHP Justin Hancock remains on roster.
June 22	LHP Brian Duensing activated from bereavement list, RHP Justin Hancock optioned to Iowa.
June 24	Recalled RHP Cory Mazzoni and RHP Justin Hancock from Iowa. LHP Rob Zastryzny placed on 10-DL. RHP Luke Farrell optioned to Iowa.
June 25	Recalled RHP Duane Underwood Jr. from Iowa. RHP Tyler Chatwood placed on paternity list. RHP Shae Simmons sent outright to Iowa.
June 26	3B Kris Bryant (shoulder) placed on 10-day DL, retroactive to June 23. RHP Justin Hancock (shoulder) placed on 10-day DL. RHP Duane Underwood Jr. optioned to Iowa, IF David Bote, RHP Luke Farrell, and RHP Dillon Maples recalled from Iowa.
June 27	RHP Brandon Morrow activated from DL. RHP Cory Mazzoni optioned to Iowa.
June 28	RHP Tyler Chatwood activated off paternity list, RHP Dillon Maples options to Iowa.

==== July ====
July 1	LHP Brian Duensing (shoulder) placed on 10-day DL, RHP Dillon Maples recalled from Iowa.
July 3	Recalled C Victor Caratini from Iowa, designated C Chris Gimenez for assignment.
July 6	RHP Oscar De La Cruz placed on the restricted list after being suspended 80 games for testing positive for a banned substance. RHP Carl Edwards Jr. (right shoulder) activated from DL. LHP Rob Zastryzny activated from DL and sent to Iowa. RHP Dillon Maples optioned to Iowa.
July 8	RHP Anthony Bass (illness) placed on 10-day DL retroactive to July 5, RHP James Norwood selected from Iowa.
July 11	3B Kris Bryant activated from DL, IF David Bote optioned to Iowa.
July 13	Activated LHP Brian Duensing from DL, optioned RHP Luke Farrell to Iowa.
July 14	RHP Carl Edwards Jr. placed on paternity list, LHP Rob Zastryzny recalled from Iowa.
July 15	Placed OF Albert Almora Jr. on family medical emergency list; recalled IF David Bote from Iowa.
July 16	RHP Carl Edwards Jr. activated off paternity list. IF David Bote and LHP Rob Zastryzny optioned to Iowa.
July 19	RHP Brandon Morrow (biceps) placed on 10-day DL. RHP Anthony Bass activated from DL, OF Albert Almora Jr. activated from family emergency list. minor league LHP Tyler Thomas traded to the Texas Rangers for RHP Jesse Chavez.
July 21	RHP Anthony Bass placed on 10-day DL. RHP James Norwood optioned to Iowa. RHP Jesse Chavez added to active roster. RHP Luke Farrell and RHP Dillon Maples recalled from Iowa.
July 22	RHP Dillon Maples optioned to Iowa.
July 24	Activated RHP Eddie Butler from 60-day DL, optioned RHP Luke Farrell to Iowa.
July 26	3B Kris Bryant placed on 10-day DL (shoulder) retroactive to July 24, IF David Bote recalled from Iowa.
July 27	RHP Eddie Butler, minor league RHP Rollie Lacy, and player to be named later traded to Texas Rangers for LHP Cole Hamels. RHP Alec Mills recalled from Iowa.
July 28	RHP optioned to Iowa, RHP Cory Mazzoni recalled.
July 29	LHP Cole Hamels added to roster. RHP Tyler Chatwood will pitch out of bullpen, RHP Cory Mazzoni optioned to Iowa.
July 31	Minor league RHP Jhon Romero traded to Washington Nationals for RHP Brandon Kintzler.

==== August ====
August 1	LHP Randy Rosario optioned to Iowa, RHP Brandon Kintzler added to active roster.
August 3	LHP Brian Duensing placed on 10-day DL (shoulder), LHP Randy Rosario recalled from Iowa.
August 10	LHP Randy Rosario optioned to Iowa. Signed LHP Jorge de la Rosa to Major League contract. RHP Yu Darvish moved to 60-day DL.
August 12	RHP Anthony Bass activated from 10-day DL, sent outright to Iowa.
August 14	Traded OF Alexander Ovalles to Texas Rangers to complete Cole Hamels trade.
August 15	Traded cash considerations to Kansas City Royals for OF Terrance Gore.
August 17	Placed LHP Mike Montgomery on the 10-day DL (shoulder inflammation), recalled LHP Randy Rosario from Iowa.
August 21	Acquired 2B Daniel Murphy from Washington Nationals for minor league IF Andruw Monasterio and cash considerations or a player to be named later.
August 22	2B Daniel Murphy added to roster, SS Addison Russell placed on 10-day DL (finger) retroactive to August 21.
August 23	RHP Tyler Chatwood placed on 10-day DL, RHP Dillon Maples recalled from Iowa.
August 24	RHP Dillon Maples optioned to Iowa, RHP Alec Mills recalled.
August 29	RHP James Norwood recalled from Iowa for doubleheader.
August 30	Traded C Chris Gimenez and a player to be named later to Minnesota Twins for C Bobby Wilson. Designated RHP Cory Mazzoni for assignment. Activated LHP Mike Montgomery from 10-day disabled list. Optioned RHP Alec Mills to Iowa. RHP James Norwood returned to Iowa.
August 31	OF Jason Heyward placed on 10-day DL (hamstring), RHP Dillon Maples recalled from Iowa.

==== September ====
September 1	Activated SS Addison Russell and 3B Kris Bryant from 10-day DL. Designated LHP Rob Zastryzny and RHP Luke Farrell for assignment. Selected contracts of OF Terrance Gore and C Taylor Davis from Iowa. Recalled RHP James Norwood from Iowa. Outrighted RHP Cory Mazzoni to Iowa. Signed LHP Jaime García to a minor league contract.
September 3	Activated LHP Brian Duensing and RHP Tyler Chatwood from 10-day DL.
September 4	Purchased contract of LHP Jaime García from Iowa. Placed OF Mark Zagunis on the 60-day DL (shoulder inflammation).
September 9	Recalled RHP Alec Mills from Iowa.
September 16	Activated OF Jason Heyward from the 10-day DL.
September 19	Transferred RHP Brandon Morrow from the 10-day disabled list to the 60-day disabled list retroactive to September 18. Selected the contract of RHP Allen Webster from Iowa.
September 21	SS Addison Russell placed on administrative leave following further allegations of domestic violence by his ex-wife.
September 22	Selected the contract of SS Mike Freeman from Iowa.
September 28	Activated C Bobby Wilson from the 10-day disabled list.

== Roster ==
(Contains all players who played in a game for the Cubs during the 2018 season.)

2018 Chicago Cubs
Roster
Pitchers: 45 Anthony Bass; 33 Eddie Butler; 21 Tyler Chatwood; 43 Jesse Chavez; 41 Steve Cishek; 11 Yu Darvish; 29 Jorge de la Rosa; 32 Brian Duensing; 6 Carl Edwards Jr.; 59 Luke Farrell; 64 Jaime García; 35 Cole Hamels; 54 Justin Hancock; 28 Kyle Hendricks; 20 Brandon Kintzler; 34 Jon Lester; 36 Dillon Maples; 60 Cory Mazzoni; 24 Alec Mills; 38 Mike Montgomery; 15 Brandon Morrow; 57 James Norwood; 62 José Quintana; 47 Randy Rosario; 46 Pedro Strop; 52 Jen-Ho Tseng; 51 Duane Underwood Jr.; 61 Allen Webster; 37 Justin Wilson; 29 Rob Zastryzny	Catchers: 7 Víctor Caratini; 40 Willson Contreras; 53 Taylor Davis; 53 Chris Gimenez; Infielders: 9 Javier Báez; 13 David Bote; 17 Kris Bryant; 4 Mike Freeman; 2 Tommy La Stella; 3 Daniel Murphy; 50,61 Efrén Navarro; 44 Anthony Rizzo; 27 Addison Russell	Outfielders: 5 Albert Almora; 1 Terrance Gore; 8 Ian Happ; 22 Jason Heyward; 12 Kyle Schwarber; 20 Mark Zagunis; 18 Ben Zobrist	Manager: 70 Joe Maddon; Coaches: 58 Mike Borzello (catching); 55 Brian Butterfield (third base); 30 Chili Davis (hitting); 19 Andy Haines (assistant hitting); 48 Jim Hickey (pitching); 16 Brandon Hyde (bench); 95 Chad Noble (bullpen catcher); 00 Lester Strode (bullpen); 25 Will Venable (first base)

== Postseason ==
=== Game log ===
2018 postseason game log: 0–1 (Home: 0–1; Away: 0–0)
Wild Card game: 0–1 (Home: 0–1; Away: 0–0)

#	Date	Opponent	Score	Win	Loss	Save	Attendance	Series
1	October 2	Rockies	1–2	Oberg (1–0)	Hendricks (0–1)	—	40,151	0–1

=== Wild Card game ===
Tuesday, October 2, 2018 7:10 pm CDT at Wrigley Field in Chicago, IL
Team	1	2	3	4	5	6	7	8	9	10	11	12	13	R	H	E
Colorado	1	0	0	0	0	0	0	0	0	0	0	0	1	2	11	1
Chicago	0	0	0	0	0	0	0	1	0	0	0	0	0	1	6	0
WP: Scott Oberg (1–0) LP: Kyle Hendricks (0–1); Home runs: COL: None; CHI: None; Attendance: 40,151

Following their loss to the Brewers the previous day, the Cubs faced the Rockies who were forced to travel from Los Angeles following their tiebreaker loss to the Dodgers to face the Cubs in Chicago on October 2. The Rockies scored in the first on two hits and a sacrifice fly giving the Rockies a 1–0 lead. Jon Lester, despite giving up the first inning run, pitched six innings and allowed only the one run. Rockies' pitcher Kyle Freeland pitched well, limiting the Cubs to four hits in 6.2 innings of work. Freeland left in the seventh with a runner on. The Cubs eventually loaded the bases via a walk and Tommy La Stella reaching on a catcher's interference. However, Jason Heyward struck out as a pinch hitter to end the threat. Following a two-out single by Anthony Rizzo in the eighth, Rizzo was lifted for pinch-runner Terrance Gore who immediately stole second. Javier Baez then doubled in Gore to tie the game. However, Albert Almora Jr struck out to end the threat. Following a quiet ninth inning, the game proceeded to extra innings. Cole Hamels entered the game for the Cubs and allowed a single in the 10th and a single and walk in the 11th, but did not give up a run. The Cubs put runners on first in second with one out in the 11th, but could not push across a run. Kyle Hendricks entered the game in the 12th and, in the 13th with two outs, gave up three straight singles to give the Rockies the 2–1 lead. The Cubs went quietly in the 13th as they lost the game 2–1.

=== Postseason rosters ===
Playoff rosters
National League Wild Card Game

- Pitchers: 24 Alec Mills 28 Kyle Hendricks 29 Jorge de la Rosa 34 Jon Lester 35 Cole Hamels 37 Justin Wilson 38 Mike Montgomery 41 Steve Cishek 43 Jesse Chavez 46 Pedro Strop 47 Randy Rosario
- Catchers: 7 Víctor Caratini 40 Willson Contreras
- Infielders: 2 Tommy La Stella 3 Daniel Murphy 9 Javier Báez 13 David Bote 17 Kris Bryant 18 Ben Zobrist 44 Anthony Rizzo
- Outfielders: 1 Terrance Gore 5 Albert Almora 8 Ian Happ 12 Kyle Schwarber 22 Jason Heyward

== Achievements and records ==
- Kris Bryant hit his 100th career home run on May 9 which also marked the three-year anniversary of his first home run. The home run also made Bryant the fastest Cub ever to hit 100 home runs, doing so in 487 games. Ernie Banks had been the fastest before Bryant, hitting his 100th homer in his 500th game.
- Also on May 9, Willson Contreras tripled twice, becoming the first Cub catcher to triple twice in the same game since Steve Swisher in 1977.
- Willson Contreras hit two home runs (one a grand slam), doubled twice, and drove in seven runs in a May 10 game against the White Sox. Contreras became the first Cub with seven extra-base hits over two games since at least 1913.
- On June 7, Anthony Rizzo hit his 175th home run as a Cub, moving him past Andre Dawson into 13th place all time in franchise history.
- On July 1, the Cubs scored 11 runs in their win over the Minnesota Twins, marking the first time since 1930 that the Cubs had scored at least 10 runs in a game in four straight games.
- On July 2, Jon Lester was named NL Pitcher of the month for June. Lester went 5–0 with a 1.13 ERA in the month.
- Also on July 2, Javier Báez was named NL Player of the week. Báez batted .483 with eight extra-base hits, 10 runs, and 11 RBI during the week.
- On July 8, Javier Báez and Willson Contreras were named starters to the All-Star game, marking their first selection to an All-Star game. Jon Lester was named to the All-Star game as well.
- On July 11, it was announced that Javier Báez and Kyle Schwarber would participate in the All-Star game home run derby.
- Kyle Schwarber finished second in the home run derby to the Washington Nationals' Bryce Harper on July 16.
- Willson Contreras homered on the first pitch he saw in the All-Star game on July 17. Javier Báez, batting leadoff for the National League, singled on the first pitch he saw in the game.
- Anthony Rizzo hit the game-winning home run in the bottom of the ninth on July 26 in his 1,000th career game.
- Anthony Rizzo singled in the third inning of a game against the Nationals on August 11 to earn his 1,000th career hit.
- Cole Hamels was named NL Pitcher of the month for August. He went 4–0 in the month with a 0.69 ERA.
- On September 30, Anthony Rizzo drove in his 100th RBI on the season becoming the first left-handed hitter to drive in 100 runs in four seasons as a Cub.
- The Cubs accomplished the statistical oddity of tying for the best record in the National League despite leading the NL (and second in the majors behind only Baltimore) in most games scoring 1 run or fewer.

== Statistics ==
=== Regular season ===
==== Batting ====
(Final regular season stats)

Players in bold are on the active roster as of the 2022 season

Note: G = Games played; AB = At bats; R = Runs; H = Hits; 2B = Doubles; 3B = Triples; HR = Home runs; RBI = Runs batted in; SB = Stolen bases; BB = Walks; K = Strikeouts; AVG = Batting average; OBP = On base percentage; SLG = Slugging percentage;

Player	G	AB	R	H	2B	3B	HR	RBI	SB	BB	K	AVG	OBP	SLG	TB
**Albert Almora Jr.**	152	444	62	127	24	1	5	41	1	24	83	.286	.323	.378	168
**Javier Báez**	160	606	101	176	40	9	34	111	21	29	167	.290	.326	.554	336
**David Bote**	74	184	23	44	9	2	6	33	3	19	60	.239	.319	.408	75
**Kris Bryant**	102	389	59	106	28	3	13	52	2	48	107	.272	.374	.460	179
Eddie Butler	8	2	0	0	0	0	0	0	0	1	0	.000	.333	.000	0
**Victor Caratini**	76	181	21	42	7	0	2	21	0	12	42	.232	.293	.304	55
Tyler Chatwood	23	25	3	4	0	0	0	2	0	1	6	.160	.192	.160	4
**Steve Cishek**	76	6	1	1	0	0	0	0	0	0	2	.167	.167	.167	1
**Willson Contreras**	138	474	50	118	27	5	10	54	4	53	121	.249	.339	.390	185
**Yu Darvish**	8	12	0	1	1	0	0	0	0	0	7	.083	.083	.167	2
Taylor Davis	5	5	0	2	0	0	0	2	0	0	1	.400	.333	.400	2
Brian Duensing	47	1	1	0	0	0	0	0	0	1	1	.000	.500	.000	1
**Luke Farrell**	19	4	0	0	0	0	0	0	0	0	3	.000	.000	.000	0
Chris Gimenez	12	28	1	4	0	0	0	1	1	3	7	.143	.219	.143	4
Terrance Gore	14	5	5	1	0	0	0	0	6	0	1	.200	.200	.200	1
Cole Hamels	11	23	1	3	0	0	1	1	0	1	12	.130	.167	.261	6
Justin Hancock	10	2	0	0	0	0	0	0	0	0	2	.000	.000	.000	0
**Ian Happ**	142	387	56	90	19	2	15	44	8	70	167	.233	.353	.408	158
**Kyle Hendricks**	31	60	1	4	1	0	0	1	0	2	31	.067	.097	.083	5
**Jason Heyward**	127	440	67	119	23	4	8	57	1	42	60	.270	.335	.395	174
Brandon Kintzler	23	1	0	0	0	0	0	0	0	0	1	.000	.000	.000	0
**Tommy La Stella**	123	169	23	45	8	0	1	19	0	17	27	.266	.340	.331	56
Jon Lester	31	59	4	7	0	0	1	9	0	0	22	.119	.119	.169	10
**Alec Mills**	7	5	0	1	0	0	0	0	0	0	2	.200	.200	.200	1
Mike Mongtomery	37	33	1	3	0	0	0	1	0	1	20	.091	.118	.091	3
Brandon Morrow	35	1	0	0	0	0	0	0	0	0	1	.000	.000	.000	0
Daniel Murphy	35	138	23	41	6	0	6	13	2	7	23	.297	.329	.471	65
Efrén Navarro	4	6	0	1	0	0	0	0	0	0	4	.167	.167	.167	1
**James Norwood**	10	3	0	0	0	0	0	0	0	0	1	.000	.000	.000	0
**José Quintana**	30	52	0	4	0	0	0	0	0	0	26	.077	.077	.077	4
**Anthony Rizzo**	153	566	74	160	29	1	25	101	6	70	80	.283	.376	.470	266
Randy Rosario	43	1	1	1	0	0	0	1	0	1	0	1.000	1.000	1.000	1
Addison Russell	130	420	52	105	21	1	5	38	4	40	99	.250	.317	.340	143
**Kyle Schwarber**	137	428	64	102	14	3	26	61	4	78	140	.238	.356	.467	200
Pedro Strop	57	2	0	0	0	0	0	0	0	0	0	.000	.000	.000	0
**Duane Underwood Jr.**	1	1	0	0	0	0	0	0	0	0	0	.000	.000	.000	0
**Justin Wilson**	67	1	1	0	0	0	0	0	0	0	1	.000	.000	.000	0
Mark Zagunis	5	5	0	2	1	0	0	1	0	1	1	.400	.500	.600	3
Ben Zobrist	139	455	67	139	28	3	9	58	3	55	60	.305	.378	.440	200
**Team totals**	**163**	**5624**	**761**	**1453**	**286**	**34**	**167**	**722**	**66**	**576**	**1388**	**.258**	**.333**	**.410**	**2308**

==== Pitching ====
(Through October 1, 2018)

Players in bold are on the active roster as of the 2022 season.

Note: W = Wins; L = Losses; ERA = Earned run average; G = Games pitched; GS = Games started; SV = Saves; IP = Innings pitched; H = Hits allowed; R = Runs allowed; ER = Earned runs allowed; BB = Walks allowed; K = Strikeouts

Player	W	L	ERA	G	GS	SV	IP	H	R	ER	BB	K
**Anthony Bass**	0	0	2.93	16	0	0	15.1	18	6	5	3	14
Eddie Butler	1	1	4.08	8	0	0	17.2	16	10	8	7	11
**Victor Caratini**	0	0	9.00	2	0	0	2.0	3	2	2	0	0
Tyler Chatwood	4	6	5.30	24	20	0	103.2	92	62	61	95	85
**Jesse Chavez**	2	1	1.15	32	0	4	39.0	26	5	5	5	42
**Steve Cishek**	4	3	2.18	80	0	4	70.1	45	19	17	28	78
**Yu Darvish**	1	3	4.95	8	8	0	40.0	36	24	22	21	49
Jorge De La Rosa	0	0	1.29	17	0	1	21.0	14	6	3	8	20
Brian Duensing	3	0	7.65	48	0	1	37.2	42	33	32	29	24
**Carl Edwards Jr.**	3	2	2.60	58	0	0	52.0	36	17	15	32	67
**Luke Farrell**	3	4	5.17	20	2	0	31.1	30	22	18	16	39
Jaime García	0	1	4.70	8	1	0	7.2	6	4	4	6	4
Chris Gimenez	0	0	27.00	1	0	0	1.0	2	3	3	1	1
Cole Hamels	4	3	2.36	12	12	0	76.1	61	23	20	23	74
Justin Hancock	0	0	1.46	10	0	0	12.1	5	2	2	9	11
**Ian Happ**	0	0	0.00	1	0	0	1.0	1	0	0	0	0
**Kyle Hendricks**	14	11	3.44	33	33	0	199.0	184	82	76	44	161
Brandon Kintzler	2	1	7.00	25	0	0	18.0	27	14	14	9	12
**Tommy La Stella**	0	0	6.75	1	0	0	1.1	3	1	1	0	0
Jon Lester	18	6	3.32	32	32	0	181.2	174	75	67	64	169
Dillon Maples	0	0	11.81	9	0	0	5.1	7	7	7	5	9
Cory Mazzoni	1	0	1.04	8	0	0	8.2	5	1	1	5	7
Mike Montgomery	5	6	3.99	38	19	0	124.0	131	58	55	39	86
Brandon Morrow	0	0	1.47	35	0	22	30.2	24	5	5	9	31
**James Norwood**	1	0	4.09	11	0	0	11.0	14	7	5	5	10
**José Quintana**	13	11	4.03	32	32	0	174.1	162	81	78	68	158
**Anthony Rizzo**	0	0	0.00	1	0	0	0.1	0	0	0	0	0
Randy Rosario	4	0	3.66	44	0	1	46.2	47	22	19	22	30
Pedro Strop	6	1	2.26	60	0	13	59.2	38	15	15	21	57
Jen-Ho Tseng	0	0	13.50	1	1	0	2.0	4	3	3	0	3
**Duane Underwood Jr.**	0	1	2.25	1	1	0	4.0	2	1	1	3	3
**Justin Wilson**	4	5	3.46	71	0	0	54.2	45	22	21	33	69
**Rob Zastryzny**	1	0	4.76	6	0	0	5.2	6	3	3	4	3
**Team totals**	**95**	**68**	**3.65**	**163**	**163**	**46**	**1476.1**	**1319**	**645**	**598**	**622**	**1333**

== Farm system ==
Level	Team	League	Manager	Location	Ballpark
AAA	Iowa Cubs	Pacific Coast League	Marty Pevey	Des Moines, Iowa	Principal Park
AA	Tennessee Smokies	Southern League	Mark Johnson	Knoxville, Tennessee	Smokies Stadium
A	Myrtle Beach Pelicans	Carolina League	Buddy Bailey	Myrtle Beach, South Carolina	TicketReturn.com Field
A	South Bend Cubs	Midwest League	Jimmy Gonzalez	South Bend, Indiana	Four Winds Field at Coveleski Stadium
A-Short Season	Eugene Emeralds	Northwest League	Steve Lerud	Eugene, Oregon	PK Park
Rookie	AZL Cubs	Arizona League	Carmelo Martínez	Mesa, Arizona	Sloan Park
Rookie	DSL Cubs	Dominican Summer League	Lance Rymel	Boca Chica, Dominican Republic	Baseball City Complex
