= Cory Mazzoni =

American baseball player (born 1989)

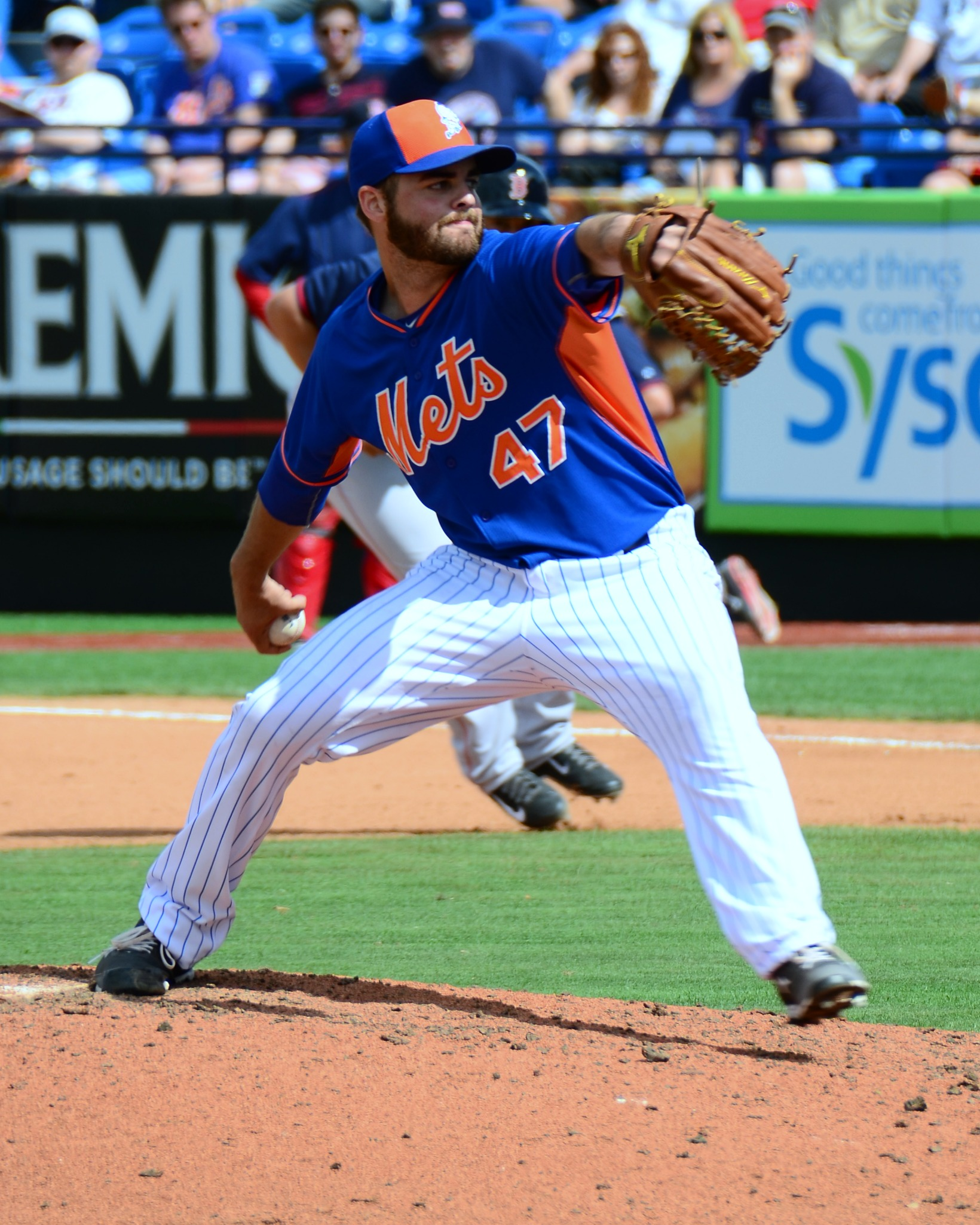
- Mazzoni with the New York Mets
- Pitcher
- Born: October 19, 1989 (age 36); Evans City, Pennsylvania, U.S.
- Batted: Right Threw: Right

MLB debut
- April 27, 2015, for the San Diego Padres

Last MLB appearance
- July 28, 2018, for the Chicago Cubs

MLB statistics
- Win–loss record: 1-0
- Earned run average: 11.72
- Strikeouts: 19
- Stats at Baseball Reference

Teams
- San Diego Padres (2015, 2017); Chicago Cubs (2018)

Cory Mitchell Mazzoni (born October 19, 1989) is an American former professional baseball pitcher. He played in Major League Baseball (MLB) for the San Diego Padres and Chicago Cubs.

== Amateur career ==
Mazzoni graduated from Seneca Valley High School in Harmony, Pennsylvania. He was drafted out of high school by the Washington Nationals in the 26th round of the 2008 MLB draft, but decided not to sign. He instead enrolled at North Carolina State University (NC State), where he played college baseball for the NC State Wolfpack baseball team.

== Professional career ==
=== New York Mets ===
The New York Mets of Major League Baseball (MLB) selected Mazzoni in the second round of the 2011 MLB draft. He made his professional debut with the Brooklyn Cyclones of the Low-A New York–Penn League in 2011, and pitched for the St. Lucie Mets of the High-A Florida State League in 2012. Pitching for the Binghamton Mets of the Double-A Eastern League in 2013, Mazzoni had a 4.36 earned run average and 74 strikeouts in 66 innings pitched. His 2013 season ended prematurely when he required surgery to repair a torn meniscus in his knee.

The Mets invited Mazzoni to spring training in 2014. On March 18, they assigned him to minor league camp. He played for the Las Vegas 51s of the Triple-A Pacific Coast League (PCL) that year. After the 2014 season, the Mets added Mazzoni to their 40-man roster to protect him from being eligible in the Rule 5 draft.

=== San Diego Padres ===
On March 30, 2015, the Mets traded Mazzoni and a player to be named later to the San Diego Padres in exchange for Alex Torres. He began the season with the Triple-A El Paso Chihuahuas, and was promoted to the major leagues on April 26. He made his MLB debut as a relief pitcher the next day. In 8 appearances during his rookie campaign, Mazzoni struggled to a 20.77 ERA with 8 strikeouts across 8 2/3 innings pitched.

Mazzoni began the 2016 season with El Paso, but made only 2 appearances before undergoing shoulder surgery, which shelved him for the remainder of the year. He was designated for assignment by the Padres on April 26, 2016. Mazzoni was released by the Padres on May 3, but re-signed to a minor league contract on May 16.

On September 12, 2017, the Padres selected Mazzoni's contract, adding him to their active roster. In 6 appearances for San Diego, he struggled to a 13.50 ERA with 4 strikeouts over 8 innings of work.

=== Chicago Cubs ===
The Chicago Cubs claimed Mazzoni from the Padres off of waivers on November 6, 2017, and he was claimed again off waivers by the Los Angeles Dodgers on March 27, 2018. On March 29, Mazzoni returned to the Cubs when they claimed him off waivers from the Dodgers. In 8 appearances for Chicago, he recorded a 1.04 ERA with 7 strikeouts across 8 2/3 innings pitched. On August 30, Mazzoni was designated for assignment, when the Cubs acquired catcher Bobby Wilson. He elected free agency on November 2.
