= Justin Hancock =

American baseball player and coach (born 1990)

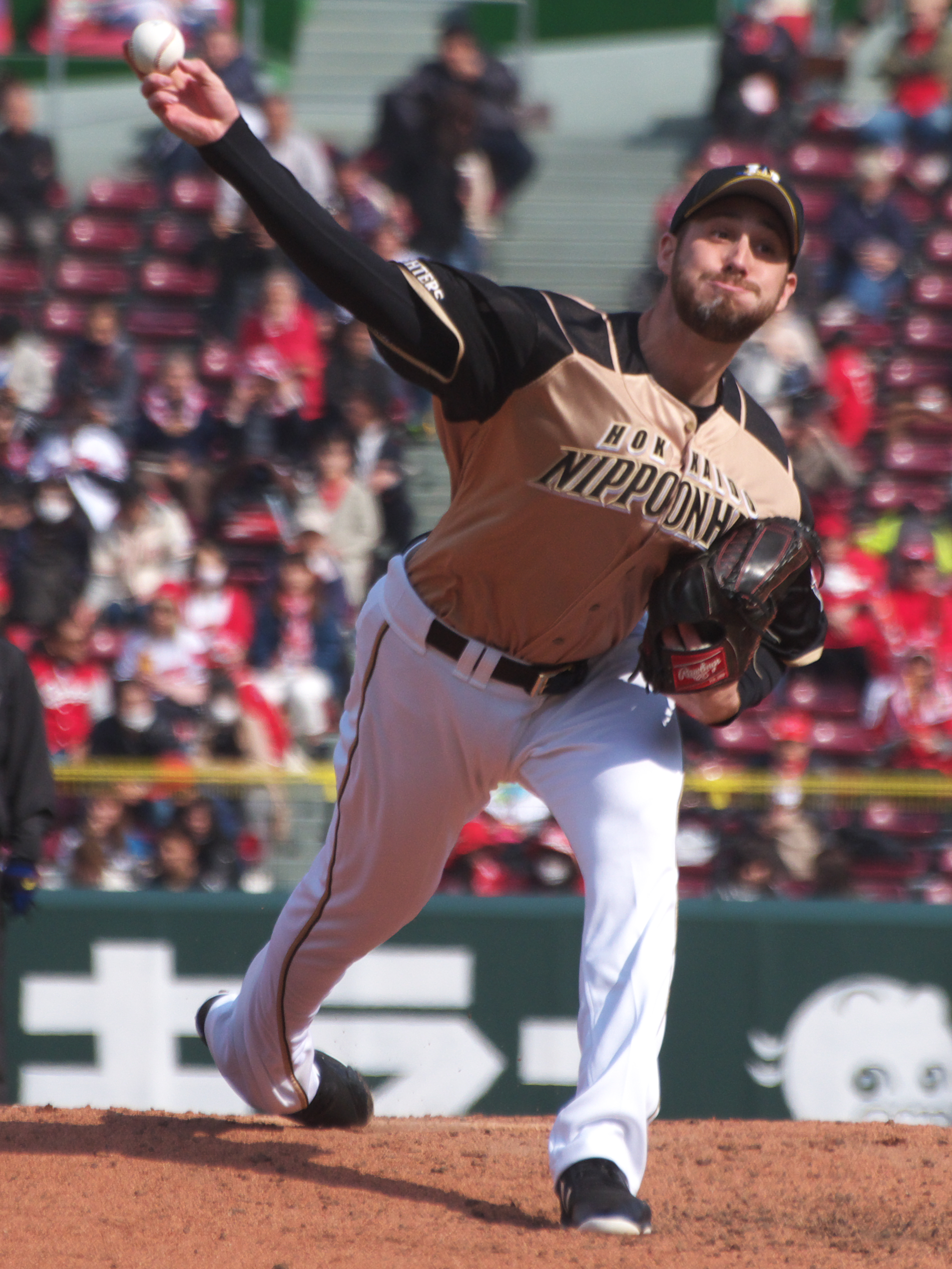
- Hancock with the Hokkaido Nippon-Ham Fighters
- Pitcher
- Born: October 28, 1990 (age 35); Defiance, Ohio, U.S.
- Bats: Right Throws: Right

Professional debut
- MLB: May 9, 2018, for the Chicago Cubs
- NPB: March 30, 2019, for the Hokkaido Nippon-Ham Fighters

MLB statistics
- Win–loss record: 0–0
- Earned run average: 1.46
- Strikeouts: 11

NPB statistics
- Win–loss record: 0–1
- Earned run average: 9.00
- Strikeouts: 8
- Stats at Baseball Reference

Teams
- Chicago Cubs (2018); Hokkaido Nippon-Ham Fighters (2019)

Justin David Hancock (born October 28, 1990) is an American baseball coach and former pitcher, who is the current pitching coach of the Indiana State Syacamores. He played in Major League Baseball (MLB) for the Chicago Cubs and in Nippon Professional Baseball (NPB) for the Hokkaido Nippon-Ham Fighters.

== Playing career ==
=== Amateur career ===
Before playing professionally, Hancock attended Defiance High School in Defiance, Ohio. He then attended Lincoln Trail College, where he was named All-Great Rivers Athletic Conference in 2011. His fastball has been clocked at 100 miles per hour (160 km/h).

=== San Diego Padres ===
The San Diego Padres drafted Hancock in the ninth round, with the 293rd overall selection, of the 2011 Major League Baseball draft, and he signed for a bonus of $100,000. After going 0–3 with a 7.09 earned run average (ERA) in 11 games during his first pro campaign, Hancock posted a 3.30 ERA with 89 strikeouts in 28 games (16 starts) between the Low-A Eugene Emeralds and Single-A Fort Wayne TinCaps in 2012.

In 2013, Hancock was 8–8 with a 3.38 ERA and 83 strikeouts in 26 starts split between Fort Wayne and the High-A Lake Elsinore Storm. While with Fort Wayne, he went 5–1 with a 1.73 and 44 strikeouts. In 2014, Hancock went 3–2 with a 3.92 ERA and 41 strikeouts in 15 games (14 starts) for the rookie-level Arizona League Padres and Double-A San Antonio Missions. He was sent to pitch in the Arizona Fall League following the 2014 campaign.

=== Chicago Cubs ===
On May 8, 2017, the Padres traded Hancock to the Chicago Cubs in exchange for Matt Szczur. He spent the remainder of the year with the Double-A Tennessee Smokies and Triple-A Iowa Cubs.

On May 9, 2018, Hancock was selected to the 40-man roster and promoted to the major leagues for the first time. In 10 appearances for the Cubs, he recorded a 1.46 ERA with 11 strikeouts across 12 1/3 innings pitched. On November 30, Hancock was non-tendered by the Cubs and became a free agent.

=== Hokkaido Nippon-Ham Fighters ===
On December 5, 2018, Hancock signed a one-year contract with the Hokkaido Nippon-Ham Fighters of Nippon Professional Baseball (NPB) for an estimated ¥70 million. In 8 appearances for the Fighters, he struggled to a 9.00 ERA with 8 strikeouts and 2 saves across 7 innings pitched. On October 11, 2019, Fighters announced that team had not re-signed Hancock for the following season. He became a free agent on October 18.

== Coaching career ==
In July 2021, Hancock joined the Indiana State baseball program as an assistant coach; in his role, he will work primarily with Sycamore pitchers.

== Personal life ==
Hancock is married to Tessa, a former college women's basketball player.
