= Zach Zaidman =

American baseball broadcaster

- Education: Syracuse University
- Occupation: Baseball/Basketball announcer
- Years active: 2004–present
- Employer: WSCR

Zach Zaidman is an American sportscaster for the Chicago Cubs radio network (since 2018) and play-by-play announcer for the DePaul Blue Demons men's basketball team on WSCR 104.3 FM. In 2026, he was named the radio play-by-play announcer for the Chicago Sky WNBA team on WCSR. He was a Chicago Bears radio network sideline reporter from 2004 to 2018.
