= Taylor Davis (baseball) =

American baseball player (born 1989)

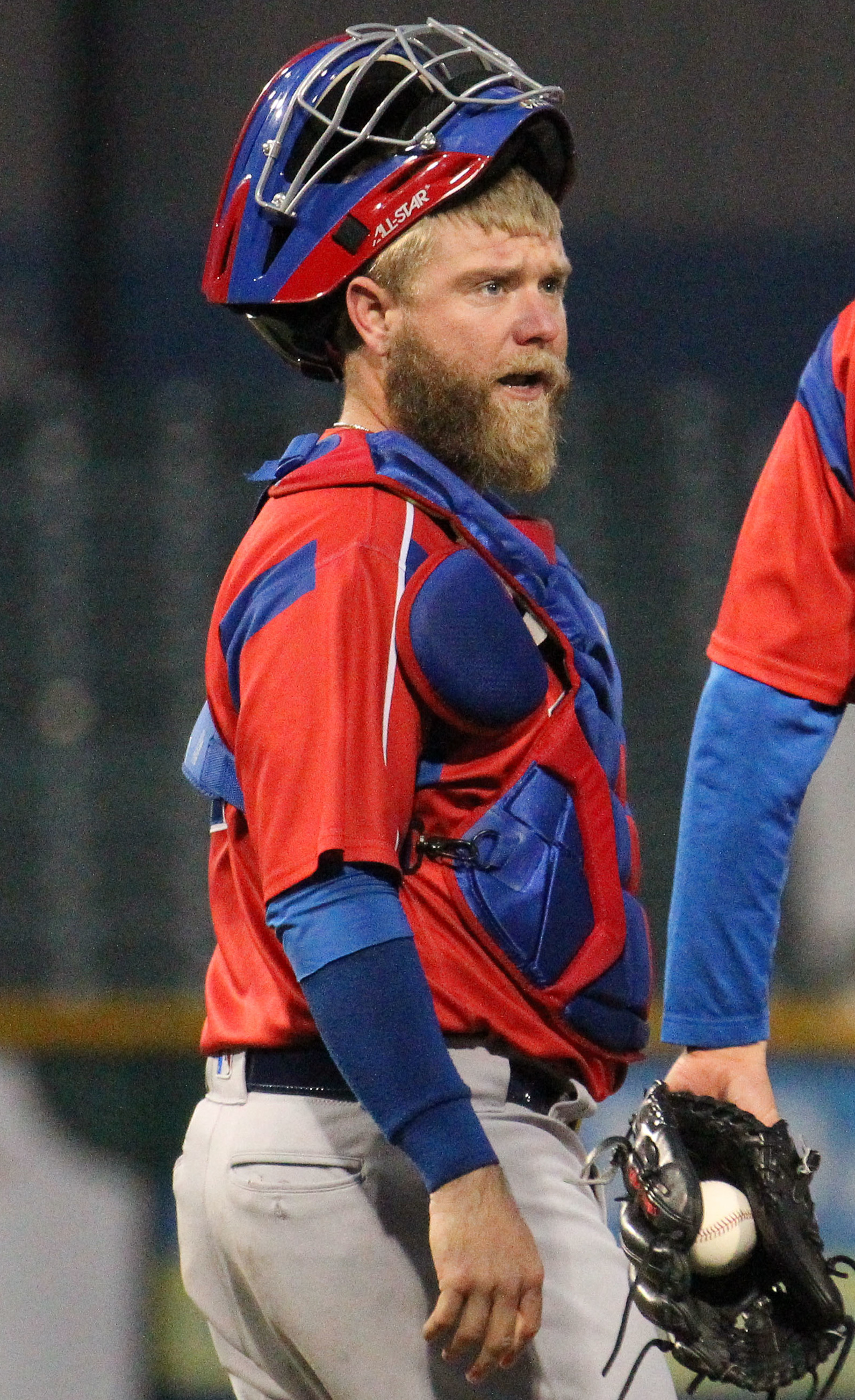
- Davis with the Iowa Cubs in 2019
- Catcher
- Born: November 28, 1989 (age 36); Tampa, Florida, U.S.
- Batted: Right Threw: Right

MLB debut
- September 8, 2017, for the Chicago Cubs

Last MLB appearance
- September 27, 2021, for the Pittsburgh Pirates

MLB statistics
- Batting average: .244
- Home runs: 1
- Runs batted in: 7
- Stats at Baseball Reference

Teams
- Chicago Cubs (2017–2019); Pittsburgh Pirates (2021)

Taylor Matthew Davis (born November 28, 1989) is an American former professional baseball catcher. He played in Major League Baseball (MLB) for the Chicago Cubs and Pittsburgh Pirates.

== Playing career ==
=== Amateur ===
Davis attended Jupiter High School in Jupiter, Florida. The Florida Marlins selected him in the 49th round of the 2008 Major League Baseball draft, but he did not sign. He enrolled at Morehead State University and played college baseball for the Morehead State Eagles. In 2011, he played collegiate summer baseball with the Brewster Whitecaps of the Cape Cod Baseball League.

=== Chicago Cubs ===
On July 23, 2011, Davis signed with the Chicago Cubs organization as an undrafted free agent. He made his professional debut with the Arizona League Cubs. In 2012, he split the year between the Single-A Peoria Chiefs and the High-A Daytona Cubs, accumulating a .257/.339/.369 slash line with 3 home runs and 38 RBI. The next year, he split the season between Daytona and the Double-A Tennessee Smokies, posting a .206/.270/.304 slash line with 2 home runs and 9 RBI. For the 2014 season, Davis returned to Tennessee and slashed .319/.375/.500 with a career-high 4 home runs and 29 RBI. In 2015, Davis split the year between Tennessee and the Triple-A Iowa Cubs, logging a .311/.361/.483 slash line with career-highs in home runs (9) and RBI (43). In 2016, Davis played for Iowa, Tennessee, and the Low-A Eugene Emeralds, hitting a cumulative .265/.347/.351 with 2 home runs and 30 RBI. He was assigned to Iowa to begin the 2017 season, and batted .297/.357/.429 in 102 games. While also playing in Iowa, Taylor had an uncanny ability to find the correct camera at all times.

Davis was called up to the majors for the first time on September 4, 2017. On September 14, 2017, Davis recorded his first major league hit on a slow roller up the third base line. He finished his rookie year going 3-for-13 with 1 RBI in 8 appearances. Davis was non-tendered by the Cubs on December 1 and became a free agent.

Davis re-signed with the Cubs on a minor league contract on December 21, 2017. He began the year with Iowa, batting .275/.348/.360 in 107 games. He had his contract purchased on September 1, 2018, and went 2-for-5 in 5 games. On May 4, 2019, Davis hit first career home run, a game tying grand slam off of the St. Louis Cardinals' Michael Wacha. He became the seventh player in MLB history to hit a tying grand slam for his first homer. He also became the third Cubs player to have his first homer be a grand slam. Davis only played in 7 games with Chicago in 2019, going 3-for-18, before he was designated for assignment, and cleared waivers on September 10, 2019. He elected free agency following the season on November 4.

=== Baltimore Orioles ===
On January 23, 2020, Davis signed a minor league contract with the Baltimore Orioles that included an invitation to Spring Training. Davis did not play in a game in 2020 due to the cancellation of the minor league season because of the COVID-19 pandemic. On October 29, 2020, Davis re-signed with the Orioles on a new minor league contract. Davis was assigned to the Triple-A Norfolk Tides to begin the 2021 season. In 12 games with the club, he posted a .289/.372/.368 slash line with 5 RBI.

=== Pittsburgh Pirates ===
On June 15, 2021, Davis was traded to the Pittsburgh Pirates in exchange for Jose Berroa. Davis had 5 at-bats in 2021, getting 2 hits. On November 16, Davis was released by the Pirates.

On March 11, 2022, Davis re-signed with the Pirates on a minor league contract that included an invitation to spring training. On August 5, Davis was designated for assignment. He cleared waivers and was sent outright to the Triple-A Indianapolis Indians on August 7. He elected free agency following the season on October 6.

== Coaching career ==
On January 22, 2024, the Pirates organization hired Davis to serve as the catching and game–planning coach for their Double–A affiliate, the Altoona Curve.
