= 2019 Chicago Cubs season =

Major League Baseball season

2019 Chicago Cubs
- League: National League
- Division: Central
- Ballpark: Wrigley Field
- City: Chicago
- Record: 84–78 (.519)
- Divisional place: 3rd
- Owners: Tom Ricketts
- President of baseball operations: Theo Epstein
- General managers: Jed Hoyer
- Managers: Joe Maddon
- Television: NBC Sports Chicago; NBC Sports Chicago Plus; WGN-TV; WLS-TV (Len Kasper, Jim Deshaies)
- Radio: WSCR; Chicago Cubs Radio Network (Pat Hughes, Ron Coomer, Zach Zaidman)

The 2019 Chicago Cubs season was the 148th season of the Chicago Cubs franchise, the 144th in the National League and the Cubs' 104th season at Wrigley Field. The Cubs were managed by Joe Maddon, in his fifth year as Cubs manager, and played their home games at Wrigley Field as members of Major League Baseball's National League Central.

The Cubs began the season on the road against the Texas Rangers on March 28 and ended it at the St. Louis Cardinals on September 29. They finished the season 84–78 to finish in third place in the Central Division. The Cubs failed to make the playoffs for the first time since 2014, after a historic late season collapse. Prior to the end of the season, the Cubs announced that Joe Maddon would not return as manager for the 2020 season.

== Previous season ==
The Cubs finished the 2018 season 95–67 to earn a tie with the Milwaukee Brewers for the division. They lost to the Brewers in a 163rd game to determine the Central Division champions, failing in their quest to win the division for a third consecutive year. Instead, they hosted the Wild Card Game against the Colorado Rockies, but the Cubs lost 2–1 in 13 innings.

== Television broadcasts ==
The 2019 season marked the last full year of Cubs' television broadcasts on WGN-TV, the FTA broadcaster for over 71 straight years beginning in 1948. It was announced that, effective from the spring training season of 2020, the Cubs were moving to a new regional cable TV channel, the Marquee Sports Network, making them the fourth team overall to have their own cable station. WLS-TV Channel 7 was the team's secondary over-the-air broadcaster for the season, but did not extend its contract. It was also the final season to be aired over NBC Sports Chicago.

== Offseason ==
=== Transactions ===
==== October 2018 ====
October 12	Did not renew the contract of hitting coach Chili Davis.
October 15	Named Anthony Iapoce as hitting coach.
October 29	LHP Jaime García, LHP Justin Wilson, RHP Jesse Chavez, C Bobby Wilson, LHP Jorge de la Rosa, and 2B Daniel Murphy elected free agency.
October 31	Claimed LHP Jerry Vasto off waivers from Kansas City Royals.

==== November 2018 ====
November 1	Claimed RF Johnny Field off waivers from Minnesota Twins. Signed free agents Darling Grullon (RHP), Edwin Castillo (SS), and Orlando Guzman (OF) to a minor league contract.
November 2	Activated RF Mark Zagunis, RHP Justin Hancock, RHP Brandon Morrow, and RHP Yu Darvish from 60-day disabled list. Assigned SS Mike Freeman and CF Terrance Gore outright to Iowa Cubs. Traded LHP Drew Smyly and a player to be named later to the Texas Rangers in exchange for player to be named later. Claimed SS Jack Reinheimer off waivers from New York Mets. Exercised their 2019 option on LHP Cole Hamels
November 3	Assistant Hitting Coach Andy Haines departed the Cubs organization to become the Hitting Coach for the Milwaukee Brewers.
November 20	Announced the resignation of pitching coach Jim Hickey. Selected the contract of LHP Justin Steele from Tennessee. Claimed LHP Ian Clarkin off waivers from the Chicago White Sox. Announced INF Jack Reinheimer was claimed off waivers by Texas. Assigned OF Johnny Field and LHP Jerry Vasto outright to Iowa.
November 29	Agreed to terms with LHP Kyle Ryan on a one-year contract.
November 30	Failed to tender 2019 contracts to INF Ronald Torreyes, RHPs Justin Hancock, and Allen Webster.

==== December 2018 ====
December 6	Named Tommy Hottovy pitching coach, Terrmel Sledge assistant hitting coach, and Chris Denorfia quality assurance coach.
December 18	Agreed to terms with INF Daniel Descalso on a two-year contract.
December 23	Agreed to terms with RHP Kendall Graveman on a one-year contract.

==== January 2019 ====
January 2	Named Mark Loretta bench coach and Bob Tewksbury coordinator, mental skills.
January 11	Agreed to terms with SS Addison Russell, 3B Kris Bryant, 2B Javier Baez, OF Kyle Schwarber, LHP Mike Montgomery, RHP Kyle Hendricks, and RHP Carl Edwards Jr. on one-year contracts.
January 14	Named Craig Breslow director of strategic initiatives for baseball operations.
January 16	Claimed LHP Ian Clarkin off waivers from the Chicago White Sox.
January 22	Named Adam Beard director of high performance.

==== February 2019 ====
February 1	Agreed to terms with RHP Tony Barnette on a one-year contract. Sent LHP Ian Clarkin outright to Iowa.
February 6	Agreed to terms with RHPs Christian Bergman, George Kontos, Carlos Ramirez, Colin Rea, Junichi Tazawa and Rob Scahill; LHP Mike Zagurski; INFs Cristhian Adames and Phillip Evans; OFs Jim Adduci and Evan Marzilli; and C Francisco Arcia on minor league contracts.
February 11	Agreed to terms with RHP Brad Brach on a one-year contract.

==== March 2019 ====
March 1	RHP Jose Rosario assigned to Chicago Cubs.
March 2	C Miguel Amaya assigned to Chicago Cubs.
March 5	SS Nico Hoerner assigned to Chicago Cubs.
March 8	LF Zach Borenstein assigned to Chicago Cubs. Kansas City Royals traded CF Donnie Dewees to Chicago Cubs for RHP Stephen Ridings. Released RHP Rob Scahill.
March 9	CF Connor Myers, 2B Levi Jordan, RF Roberto Caro, and SS Rafael Narea assigned to Chicago Cubs. Optioned LHP Justin Steele and RHP Oscar De La Cruz to Tennessee Smokies. Optioned RHP Adbert Alzolay and RHP Jen-Ho Tseng to Iowa Cubs.
March 15	Optioned RHP Duane Underwood Jr., RHP James Norwood, and RHP Rowan Wick to Iowa Cubs. Signed free agent OF Felix Stevens to a minor league contract.
March 18	Released RHP Marion Meza.
March 19	OF Cole Roederer and RHP Thomas Hatch assigned to Chicago Cubs
March 20	Released RHP Christian Bergman.
March 22	Option RHP Alec Mills to Iowa Cubs. Signed free agent CF Cirstian More and RHP Jonathan Alvarez to minor league contracts.
March 23	SS Luis Vazquez and RHP Ryan Williams assigned to Chicago Cubs. Released LHP Mike Zagurski, RHP Jose Rosario, SS Ryan Court, and CF Evan Marzilli.
March 24	Designated LHP Brian Duensing for assignment. Optioned Dillon Maples, Ian Happ. Tim Collins, RHP Alec Mills, and Taylor Davis to Iowa Cubs. Released RHP Junichi Tazawa. Signed free agent LHP Tim Collins.
March 26	Optioned Kyle Ryan to Iowa Cubs.
March 28	Placed RHP Brandon Morrow on the 10-day injured list retroactive to March 25, 2019. Placed LHP Xavier Cedeno on the 10-day injured list retroactive to March 25, 2019. Placed RHP Tony Barnette on the 10-day injured list retroactive to March 25, 2019. Sent LHP Brian Duensing outright to Iowa Cubs.

== Regular season ==
=== Game log ===
2019 regular season game log: 84–78 (.519) (Home: 51–30; Away: 33–48)
March: 1–2 (.333) (Home: 0–0; Away: 1–2)

#	Date	Opponent	Score	Win	Loss	Save	Stadium	Attendance	Record	Box/ Streak
1	March 28	@ Rangers	12–4	**Lester** (1–0)	Minor (0–1)	—	Globe Life Park	48,538	1–0	W1
2	March 30	@ Rangers	6–8	Kelley (1–0)	**Edwards Jr.** (0–1)	Leclerc (1)	Globe Life Park	46,238	1–1	L1
3	March 31	@ Rangers	10–11	Leclerc (1–0)	**Strop** (0–1)	—	Globe Life Park	36,812	1–2	L2

April: 14–10 (.583) (Home: 7–4; Away: 7–6)

#	Date	Opponent	Score	Win	Loss	Save	Stadium	Attendance	Record	Box/ Streak
4	April 1	@ Braves	0–8	Parsons (1–1)	**Hendricks** (0–1)	—	SunTrust Park	41,912	1–3	L3
5	April 3	@ Braves	4–6	Jackson (1–0)	**Cishek** (0–1)	Vizcaíno (1)	SunTrust Park	37,398	1–4	L4
6	April 4	@ Braves	4–9	Fried (1–0)	**Darvish** (0–1)	—	SunTrust Park	33,815	1–5	L5
7	April 5	@ Brewers	10–13	Anderson (1–0)	**Quintana** (0–1)	—	Miller Park	34,926	1–6	L6
8	April 6	@ Brewers	14–8	**Hamels** (1–0)	Burnes (0–1)	—	Miller Park	42,790	2–6	W1
9	April 7	@ Brewers	2–4	Davies (1–0)	**Hendricks** (0–2)	Hader (5)	Miller Park	40,322	2–7	L1
10	April 8	Pirates	10–0	**Brach** (1–0)	Taillon (0–2)	—	**Wrigley Field**	40,692	3–7	W1
11	April 10	Pirates	2–5	Lyles (1–0)	**Darvish** (0–2)	Vázquez (3)	**Wrigley Field**	32,798	3–8	L1
12	April 11	Pirates	2–0	**Quintana** (1–1)	Musgrove (1–1)	**Strop** (1)	**Wrigley Field**	31,906	4–8	W1
13	April 12	Angels	5–1	**Hamels** (2–0)	Skaggs (1–2)	—	**Wrigley Field**	30,102	5–8	W2
14	April 13	Angels	5–6	Buttrey (1–0)	**Hendricks** (0–3)	Allen (4)	**Wrigley Field**	38,755	5–9	L1
—	April 14	Angels	**Postponed (snow)** (Makeup date: June 3)							
15	April 15	@ Marlins	7–2	**Darvish** (1–2)	Richards (0–2)	—	Marlins Park	9,888	6–9	W1
16	April 16	@ Marlins	4–0	**Quintana** (2–1)	López (1–3)	–	Marlins Park	8,137	7–9	W2
17	April 17	@ Marlins	6–0	**Hamels** (3–0)	Alcántara (1–2)	—	Marlins Park	10,247	8–9	W3
18	April 19	Diamondbacks	5–1	**Hendricks** (1–3)	Kelly (1–2)	**Strop** (2)	**Wrigley Field**	33,938	9–9	W4
19	April 20	Diamondbacks	0–6	Greinke (3–1)	**Darvish** (1–3)	Clarke (1)	**Wrigley Field**	37,667	9–10	L1
20	April 21	Diamondbacks	2–1	**Strop** (1–1)	Bradley (1–2)	—	**Wrigley Field**	38,181	10–10	W1
21	April 23	Dodgers	7–2	**Quintana** (3–1)	Maeda (3–2)	—	**Wrigley Field**	35,536	11–10	W2
22	April 24	Dodgers	7–6	**Brach** (2–0)	Alexander (1–1)	**Strop** (3)	**Wrigley Field**	35,743	12–10	W3
23	April 25	Dodgers	1–2	Báez (2–1)	**Lester** (1–1)	Jansen (8)	**Wrigley Field**	35,451	12–11	L1
24	April 26	@ Diamondbacks	3–8	Ray (1–1)	**Hendricks** (1–4)	Andriese (1)	Chase Field	30,664	12–12	L2
25	April 27	@ Diamondbacks	9–1	**Darvish** (2–3)	Godley (1–2)	—	Chase Field	27,793	13–12	W1
26	April 28	@ Diamondbacks	6–5 (15)	**Chatwood** (1–0)	Andriese (3–2)	**Webster** (1)	Chase Field	29,477	14–12	W2
27	April 30	@ Mariners	6–5	**Brach** (3–0)	Brennan (1–2)	**Cishek** (1)	T-Mobile Park	27,545	15–12	W3

May: 16–12 (.571) (Home: 11–6; Away: 5–6)

#	Date	Opponent	Score	Win	Loss	Save	Stadium	Attendance	Record	Box/ Streak
28	May 1	@ Mariners	11–0	**Lester** (2–1)	Gonzales (5–1)	—	T-Mobile Park	29,471	16–12	W4
29	May 3	Cardinals	4–0	**Hendricks** (2–4)	Flaherty (3–2)	—	**Wrigley Field**	34,978	17–12	W5
30	May 4	Cardinals	6–5	**Kintzler** (1–0)	Brebbia (1–1)	**Strop** (4)	**Wrigley Field**	39,601	18–12	W6
31	May 5	Cardinals	13–5	**Quintana** (4–1)	Wainwright (3–3)	—	**Wrigley Field**	36,499	19–12	W7
32	May 6	Marlins	5–6	Conley (1–3)	**Strop** (1–2)	Romo (6)	**Wrigley Field**	34,555	19–13	L1
33	May 7	Marlins	5–2	**Cishek** (1–1)	Conley (1–4)	—	**Wrigley Field**	35,274	20–13	W1
34	May 8	Marlins	3–2 (11)	**Edwards Jr.** (1–1)	Quijada (0–1)	—	**Wrigley Field**	37,241	21–13	W2
35	May 9	Marlins	4–1	**Montgomery** (1–0)	Richards (0–5)	—	**Wrigley Field**	32,301	22–13	W3
36	May 10	Brewers	0–7	González (1–0)	**Quintana** (4–2)	—	**Wrigley Field**	37,870	22–14	L1
37	May 11	Brewers	2–1 (15)	**Chatwood** (2–0)	Smith (0–1)	—	**Wrigley Field**	39,598	23–14	W1
38	May 12	Brewers	4–1	**Lester** (3–1)	Chacín (3–4)	**Cishek** (2)	**Wrigley Field**	37,267	24–14	W2
39	May 14	@ Reds	3–1	**Hendricks** (3–4)	Roark (3–2)	**Cishek** (3)	Great American Ball Park	16,853	25–14	W3
40	May 15	@ Reds	5–6 (10)	Garrett (3–1)	**Brach** (3–1)	—	Great American Ball Park	17,101	25–15	L1
41	May 16	@ Reds	2–4	Castillo (5–1)	**Quintana** (4–3)	Iglesias (9)	Great American Ball Park	18,739	25–16	L2
42	May 17	@ Nationals	14–6	**Hamels** (4–0)	Scherzer (2–5)	—	Nationals Park	33,296	26–16	W1
43	May 18	@ Nationals	2–5	Strasburg (4–3)	**Lester** (3–2)	Doolittle (8)	Nationals Park	37,582	26–17	L1
44	May 19	@ Nationals	6–5	**Hendricks** (4–4)	Hellickson (2–3)	**Cishek** (4)	Nationals Park	23,244	27–17	W1
45	May 20	Phillies	4–5 (10)	Neris (1–1)	**Ryan** (0–1)	Nicasio (1)	**Wrigley Field**	37,909	27–18	L1
46	May 21	Phillies	3–2	**Ryan** (1–1)	Nicasio (0–2)	—	**Wrigley Field**	36,768	28–18	W1
47	May 22	Phillies	8–4	**Chatwood** (3–0)	Irvin (2–1)	—	**Wrigley Field**	39,246	29–18	W2
48	May 23	Phillies	7–9	Nola (5–0)	**Lester** (3–3)	Neris (8)	**Wrigley Field**	37,173	29–19	L1
49	May 24	Reds	5–6	Hernandez (1–2)	**Cishek** (1–2)	Iglesias (11)	**Wrigley Field**	35,266	29–20	L2
50	May 25	Reds	8–6	**Maples** (1–0)	Hughes (2–2)	**Chatwood** (1)	**Wrigley Field**	40,929	30–20	W1
51	May 26	Reds	2–10	Roark (4–3)	**Quintana** (4–4)	—	**Wrigley Field**	40,884	30–21	L1
52	May 27	@ Astros	5–6	Cole (5–5)	**Hamels** (4–1)	Osuna (14)	Minute Maid Park	42,135	30–22	L2
53	May 28	@ Astros	6–9	James (2–0)	**Lester** (3–4)	Osuna (15)	Minute Maid Park	31,030	30–23	L3
54	May 29	@ Astros	2–1	**Hendricks** (5–4)	Miley (5–3)	**Cishek** (5)	Minute Maid Park	33,243	31–23	W1
55	May 31	@ Cardinals	1–2	Hicks (2–2)	**Montgomery** (1–1)	—	Busch Stadium	45,321	31–24	L1

June: 14–15 (.483) (Home: 11–6; Away: 3–9)

#	Date	Opponent	Score	Win	Loss	Save	Stadium	Attendance	Record	Box/ Streak
56	June 1	@ Cardinals	4–7	Gant (4–0)	**Chatwood** (3–1)	Martínez (1)	Busch Stadium	46,297	31–25	L2
57	June 2	@ Cardinals	1–2	Wainwright (5–5)	**Hamels** (4–2)	Gant (3)	Busch Stadium	46,053	31–26	L3
58	June 3	Angels	8–1	**Lester** (4–4)	Cahill (2–6)	—	**Wrigley Field**	39,843	32–26	W1
59	June 4	Rockies	6–3	**Hendricks** (6–4)	Hoffman (1–2)	**Strop** (5)	**Wrigley Field**	36,753	33–26	W2
60	June 5	Rockies	9–8	**Kintzler** (2–0)	Márquez (6–3)	**Cishek** (6)	**Wrigley Field**	35,395	34–26	W3
61	June 6	Rockies	1–3	Lambert (1–0)	**Quintana** (4–5)	Oberg (3)	**Wrigley Field**	36,375	34–27	L1
62	June 7	Cardinals	3–1	**Hamels** (5–2)	Mikolas (4–6)	**Strop** (6)	**Wrigley Field**	40,671	35–27	W1
63	June 8	Cardinals	9–4	**Lester** (5–4)	Brebbia (1–3)	—	**Wrigley Field**	41,005	36–27	W2
64	June 9	Cardinals	5–1	**Hendricks** (7–4)	Wainwright (5–6)	**Strop** (7)	**Wrigley Field**	39,545	37–27	W3
65	June 10	@ Rockies	5–6	Oberg (4–0)	**Cishek** (1–3)	Davis (8)	Coors Field	44,859	37–28	L1
66	June 11	@ Rockies	3–10	Lambert (2–0)	**Quintana** (4–6)	—	Coors Field	43,126	37–29	L2
67	June 12	@ Rockies	10–1	**Hamels** (6–2)	Senzatela (5–5)	—	Coors Field	47,412	38–29	W1
68	June 13	@ Dodgers	3–7	Kershaw (6–1)	**Lester** (5–5)	Urías (3)	Dodger Stadium	44,970	38–30	L1
69	June 14	@ Dodgers	3–5	Hill (4–1)	**Hendricks** (7–5)	Jansen (20)	Dodger Stadium	46,631	38–31	L2
70	June 15	@ Dodgers	2–1	**Ryan** (2–1)	Jansen (2–2)	**Strop** (8)	Dodger Stadium	51,596	39–31	W1
71	June 16	@ Dodgers	2–3	Stripling (3–2)	**Cishek** (1–4)	Jansen (21)	Dodger Stadium	53,817	39–32	L1
72	June 18	White Sox	1–3	Marshall (3–0)	**Strop** (1–3)	Colomé (15)	**Wrigley Field**	41,192	39–33	L2
73	June 19	White Sox	7–3	**Lester** (6–5)	Giolito (10–2)	—	**Wrigley Field**	39,776	40–33	W1
74	June 20	Mets	7–4	**Alzolay** (1–0)	Lockett (0–1)	**Cishek** (7)	**Wrigley Field**	38,956	41–33	W2
75	June 21	Mets	4–5	Pounders (1–0)	**Brach** (3–2)	Díaz (16)	**Wrigley Field**	41,078	41–34	L1
76	June 22	Mets	2–10	Wheeler (6–5)	**Quintana** (4–7)	—	**Wrigley Field**	41,106	41–35	L2
77	June 23	Mets	5–3	**Cishek** (2–4)	Lugo (3–1)	**Strop** (9)	**Wrigley Field**	39,077	42–35	W1
78	June 24	Braves	8–3	**Lester** (7–5)	Teherán (5–6)	—	**Wrigley Field**	37,603	43–35	W2
79	June 25	Braves	2–3	Fried (9–3)	**Montgomery** (1–2)	Jackson (12)	**Wrigley Field**	37,333	43–36	L1
80	June 26	Braves	3–5	Keuchel (1–1)	**Darvish** (2–4)	Minter (4)	**Wrigley Field**	38,017	43–37	L2
81	June 27	Braves	9–7	**Chatwood** (4–1)	Tomlin (1–1)	**Kimbrel** (1)	**Wrigley Field**	39,823	44–37	W1
82	June 28	@ Reds	3–6	Gray (4–5)	**Hamels** (6–3)	Lorenzen (5)	Great American Ball Park	36,919	44–38	L1
83	June 29	@ Reds	6–0	**Quintana** (5–7)	Castillo (7–3)	—	Great American Ball Park	41,360	45–38	W1
84	June 30	@ Reds	6–8	DeSclafani (5–4)	**Lester** (7–6)	Iglesias (14)	Great American Ball Park	31,165	45–39	L1

July: 12–11 (.522) (Home: 7–2; Away: 5–9)

#	Date	Opponent	Score	Win	Loss	Save	Stadium	Attendance	Record	Box/ Streak
85	July 1	@ Pirates	5–18	Williams (3–2)	**Alzolay** (1–1)	—	PNC Park	17,772	45–40	L2
86	July 2	@ Pirates	1–5	Holmes (1–0)	**Hendricks** (7–6)	—	PNC Park	14,573	45–41	L3
87	July 3	@ Pirates	5–6	Rodríguez (3–3)	**Kimbrel** (0–1)	—	PNC Park	17,831	45–42	L4
88	July 4	@ Pirates	11–3	**Quintana** (6–7)	Lyles (5–5)	—	PNC Park	29,238	46–42	W1
89	July 6	@ White Sox	6–3	**Lester** (8–6)	Giolito (11–3)	**Kimbrel** (2)	Guaranteed Rate Field	38,634	47–42	W2
90	July 7	@ White Sox	1–3	Nova (4–7)	**Hendricks** (7–7)	Colomé (20)	Guaranteed Rate Field	38,554	47–43	L1
ASG	July 9	NL @ AL	3–4	Tanaka (1–0) (NYY)	Kershaw (0–1) (LAD)	Chapman (1) (NYY)	Progressive Field	36,747	–	N/A
91	July 12	Pirates	4–3	**Rosario** (1–0)	Crick (3–5)	**Kimbrel** (3)	**Wrigley Field**	40,740	48–43	W1
92	July 13	Pirates	10–4	**Lester** (9–6)	Lyles (5–6)	—	**Wrigley Field**	40,286	49–43	W2
93	July 14	Pirates	8–3	**Quintana** (7–7)	Williams (3–3)	—	**Wrigley Field**	39,291	50–43	W3
94	July 15	Reds	3–6	Castillo (9–3)	**Cishek** (2–5)	Iglesias (17)	**Wrigley Field**	36,935	50–44	L1
95	July 16	Reds	4–3 (10)	**Cishek** (3–5)	Iglesias (2–8)	—	**Wrigley Field**	39,788	51–44	W1
96	July 17	Reds	5–2	**Darvish** (3–4)	Gray (5–6)	**Kimbrel** (4)	**Wrigley Field**	37,260	52–44	W2
97	July 19	Padres	6–5	**Strop** (2–3)	Stammen (6–5)	**Kimbrel** (5)	**Wrigley Field**	39,526	53–44	W3
98	July 20	Padres	6–5	**Quintana** (8–7)	Lucchesi (7–5)	**Kimbrel** (6)	**Wrigley Field**	40,314	54–44	W4
99	July 21	Padres	1–5	Quantrill (3–2)	**Hendricks** (7–8)	—	**Wrigley Field**	39,954	54–45	L1
100	July 22	@ Giants	4–5	Gott (7–0)	**Strop** (2–4)	Dyson (2)	Oracle Park	37,119	54–46	L2
101	July 23	@ Giants	4–5 (13)	Coonrod (1–0)	**Brach** (3–3)	—	Oracle Park	39,747	54–47	L3
102	July 24	@ Giants	4–1	**Ryan** (3–1)	Beede (3–4)	**Kimbrel** (7)	Oracle Park	37,746	55–47	W1
103	July 26	@ Brewers	2–3	Houser (4–4)	**Kintzler** (2–1)	Hader (23)	Miller Park	40,566	55–48	L1
104	July 27	@ Brewers	3–5 (10)	Peralta (5–3)	**Kimbrel** (0–2)	—	Miller Park	43,931	55–49	L2
105	July 28	@ Brewers	11–4	**Brach** (4–3)	Davies (8–4)	—	Miller Park	43,544	56–49	W1
106	July 30	@ Cardinals	1–2	Gallegos (3–1)	**Darvish** (3–5)	Martínez (11)	Busch Stadium	46,123	56–50	L1
107	July 31	@ Cardinals	2–0	**Hendricks** (8–8)	Mikolas (7–11)	**Kimbrel** (8)	Busch Stadium	43,750	57–50	W1

August: 16–12 (.571) (Home: 9–5; Away: 7–7)

#	Date	Opponent	Score	Win	Loss	Save	Stadium	Attendance	Record	Box/ Streak
108	August 1	@ Cardinals	0–8	Flaherty (5–6)	**Lester** (9–7)	—	Busch Stadium	46,811	57–51	L1
109	August 2	Brewers	6–2	**Quintana** (9–7)	Davies (8–5)	—	**Wrigley Field**	41,424	58–51	W1
110	August 3	Brewers	4–1	**Wick** (1–0)	Guerra (3–3)	**Kimbrel** (9)	**Wrigley Field**	41,186	59–51	W2
111	August 4	Brewers	7–2	**Darvish** (4–5)	Houser (4–5)	**Chatwood** (2)	**Wrigley Field**	40,466	60–51	W3
112	August 5	Athletics	6–5	**Wick** (2–0)	Treinen (6–4)	**Phelps** (1)	**Wrigley Field**	40,721	61–51	W4
113	August 6	Athletics	4–11	Anderson (10–7)	**Lester** (9–8)	—	**Wrigley Field**	40,627	61–52	L1
114	August 7	Athletics	10–1	**Quintana** (10–7)	Bailey (9–8)	—	**Wrigley Field**	41,179	62–52	W1
115	August 8	@ Reds	12–5	**Chatwood** (5–1)	Gausman (3–8)	—	Great American Ball Park	20,111	63–52	W2
116	August 9	@ Reds	2–5	Bauer (10–8)	**Darvish** (4–6)	Iglesias (23)	Great American Ball Park	31,569	63–53	L1
117	August 10	@ Reds	1–10	Gray (7–6)	**Hendricks** (8–9)	Romano (2)	Great American Ball Park	39,866	63–54	L2
118	August 11	@ Reds	6–3	**Phelps** (1–0)	Lorenzen (0–3)	**Strop** (10)	Great American Ball Park	31,929	64–54	W1
119	August 13	@ Phillies	4–2	Parker (2–2)	**Ryan** (3–2)	Neris (21)	Citizens Bank Park	26,442	64–55	L1
120	August 14	@ Phillies	1–11	Nola (11–3)	**Hamels** (6–4)	—	Citizens Bank Park	27,204	64–56	L2
121	August 15	@ Phillies	5–7	Suárez (4–1)	**Strop** (2–5)	—	Citizens Bank Park	37,064	64–57	L3
122	August 16	@ Pirates	2–3	Kela (2–0)	**Kintzler** (2–2)	—	PNC Park	29,746	64–58	L4
123	August 17	@ Pirates	2–0	**Lester** (10–8)	Brault (3–2)	**Wick** (1)	PNC Park	28,359	65–58	W1
124	August 18	@ Pirates	7–1	**Quintana** (11–7)	Keller (1–2)	—	BB&T Ballpark at Historic Bowman Field	2,503	66–58	W2
125	August 20	Giants	5–3	**Hamels** (7–4)	Abad (0–1)	**Kimbrel** (10)	**Wrigley Field**	36,969	67–58	W3
126	August 21	Giants	12–11	**Kintzler** (3–2)	Moronta (3–7)	**Kimbrel** (11)	**Wrigley Field**	38,619	68–58	W4
127	August 22	Giants	1-0	**Hendricks** (9-9)	Samardzija (9–10)	**Wick** (2)	**Wrigley Field**	36,366	69–58	W5
128	August 23	Nationals	3–9	Sánchez (8–6)	**Lester** (10–9)	—	**Wrigley Field**	39,889	69–59	L1
129	August 24	Nationals	2–7	Suero (4–7)	**Quintana** (11–9)	—	**Wrigley Field**	41,159	69–60	L2
130	August 25	Nationals	5–7 (11)	Hudson (7–3)	**Chatwood** (5–2)	—	**Wrigley Field**	40,518	69–61	L3
131	August 27	@ Mets	5–2	**Darvish** (5–6)	Stroman (7–12)	—	Citi Field	34,158	70–61	W1
132	August 28	@ Mets	10–7	**Ryan** (4–2)	Syndergaard (9–7)	**Kimbrel** (12)	Citi Field	33,987	71–61	W2
133	August 29	@ Mets	4–1	**Lester** (11–9)	deGrom (8–8)	**Kimbrel** (13)	Citi Field	38,389	72-61	W3
134	August 30	Brewers	7–1	**Quintana** (12–8)	Anderson (6–4)	—	**Wrigley Field**	40,276	73–61	W4
135	August 31	Brewers	0–2	Guerra (8–4)	**Hamels** (7–5)	Hader (27)	**Wrigley Field**	40,178	73–62	L1

September: 11–16 (.407) (Home: 6–7; Away: 5–9)

#	Date	Opponent	Score	Win	Loss	Save	Stadium	Attendance	Record	Box/ Streak
136	September 1	Brewers	0–4	Jackson (1–0)	**Chatwood** (5–3)	—	**Wrigley Field**	40,912	73–63	L2
137	September 2	Mariners	5–1	**Phelps** (2–0)	Wisler (3–3)	—	**Wrigley Field**	39,133	74–63	W1
138	September 3	Mariners	6–1	**Lester** (12–9)	Hernández (1–5)	—	**Wrigley Field**	33,958	75–63	W2
139	September 5	@ Brewers	10–5	**Quintana** (13–8)	Albers (5–5)	—	Miller Park	31,007	76–63	W3
140	September 6	@ Brewers	1–7	Davies (9–7)	**Hamels** (7–6)	—	Miller Park	38,139	76–64	L1
141	September 7	@ Brewers	2–3	Hader (3–5)	**Kintzler** (3–3)	—	Miller Park	44,323	76–65	L2
142	September 8	@ Brewers	5–8	Suter (1–0)	**Lester** (12–10)	Hader (29)	Miller Park	44,271	76–66	L3
143	September 9	@ Padres	10–2	**Hendricks** (10–9)	Quantrill (6–7)	—	Petco Park	22,420	77–66	W1
144	September 10	@ Padres	8–9	Báez (1–1)	**Cishek** (3–6)	—	Petco Park	25,497	77–67	L1
145	September 11	@ Padres	0–4	Paddack (9–7)	**Hamels** (7–7)	—	Petco Park	24,203	77–68	L2
146	September 12	@ Padres	4–1	**Darvish** (6–6)	Lamet (2–5)	—	Petco Park	22,501	78–68	W1
147	September 13	Pirates	17–8	**Lester** (13–10)	Brault (4–5)	**Mills** (1)	**Wrigley Field**	39,080	79–68	W2
148	September 14	Pirates	14–1	**Hendricks** (11–9)	Marvel (0–2)	—	**Wrigley Field**	39,928	80–68	W3
149	September 15	Pirates	16–6	**Wieck** (1–0)	Williams (7–7)	—	**Wrigley Field**	39,103	81–68	W4
150	September 16	Reds	8–2	**Mills** (1–0)	Gausman (3–9)	—	**Wrigley Field**	33,753	82–68	W5
151	September 17	Reds	2–4	Gray (11–7)	**Darvish** (6–7)	Iglesias (32)	**Wrigley Field**	34,267	82–69	L1
152	September 18	Reds	2–3 (10)	Garrett (5–3)	**Norwood** (0–1)	Iglesias (33)	**Wrigley Field**	36,578	82–70	L2
153	September 19	Cardinals	4–5 (10)	Miller (5–5)	**Kimbrel** (0–3)	Gallegos (1)	**Wrigley Field**	39,524	82–71	L3
154	September 20	Cardinals	1–2	Helsley (2–0)	**Phelps** (2–1)	Martínez (22)	**Wrigley Field**	39,106	82–72	L4
155	September 21	Cardinals	8–9	Gant (11–1)	**Kimbrel** (0–4)	Martínez (23)	**Wrigley Field**	40,071	82–73	L5
156	September 22	Cardinals	2–3	Webb (2–1)	**Darvish** (6–8)	Miller (6)	**Wrigley Field**	38,606	82–74	L6
157	September 24	@ Pirates	2–9	Liriano (5–3)	**Hendricks** (11–10)	—	PNC Park	9,989	82–75	L7
158	September 25	@ Pirates	2–4	Feliz (4–4)	**Wieck** (1–2)	Kela (1)	PNC Park	10,592	82–76	L8
159	September 26	@ Pirates	5–9	Musgrove (11–12)	**Quintana** (13–9)	—	PNC Park	10,529	82–77	L9
160	September 27	@ Cardinals	8–2	**Wieck** (2–2)	Miller (5–6)	—	Busch Stadium	46,530	83–77	W1
161	September 28	@ Cardinals	8–6	**Cishek** (4–6)	Wainwright (14–10)	**Kintzler** (1)	Busch Stadium	46,971	84–77	W2
162	September 29	@ Cardinals	0–9	**Flaherty** (11–8)	Holland (2–5)	—	Busch Stadium	47,212	84–78	L1

Legend: = Win = Loss = Postponement
Bold = Cubs team member

=== Season standings ===
NL Central
Team	W	L	Pct.	GB	Home	Road
St. Louis Cardinals	91	71	.562	—	50‍–‍31	41‍–‍40
Milwaukee Brewers	89	73	.549	2	49‍–‍32	40‍–‍41
Chicago Cubs	84	78	.519	7	51‍–‍30	33‍–‍48
Cincinnati Reds	75	87	.463	16	41‍–‍40	34‍–‍47
Pittsburgh Pirates	69	93	.426	22	35‍–‍46	34‍–‍47

Division leaders
Team	W	L	Pct.
Los Angeles Dodgers	106	56	.654
Atlanta Braves	97	65	.599
St. Louis Cardinals	91	71	.562

Wild Card teams (Top 2 teams qualify for postseason)
Team	W	L	Pct.	GB
Washington Nationals	93	69	.574	+4
Milwaukee Brewers	89	73	.549	—
New York Mets	86	76	.531	3
Arizona Diamondbacks	85	77	.525	4
Chicago Cubs	84	78	.519	5
Philadelphia Phillies	81	81	.500	8
San Francisco Giants	77	85	.475	12
Cincinnati Reds	75	87	.463	14
Colorado Rockies	71	91	.438	18
San Diego Padres	70	92	.432	19
Pittsburgh Pirates	69	93	.426	20
Miami Marlins	57	105	.352	32

=== Record vs. opponents ===
2019 National League record Source: MLB Standings Grid – 2019
Team	AZ	ATL	CHC	CIN	COL	LAD	MIA	MIL	NYM	PHI	PIT	SD	SF	STL	WSH	AL
Arizona	—	4–3	2–4	3–3	9–10	8–11	3–4	2–5	2–5	4–2	6–1	11–8	10–9	3–3	4–3	14–6
Atlanta	3–4	—	5–2	3–4	3–3	2–4	15–4	3–3	11–8	9–10	5–2	5–2	5–2	4–2	11–8	13–7
Chicago	4–2	2–5	—	8–11	3–3	3–4	6–1	9–10	5–2	2–5	11–8	4–3	4–2	9–10	2–4	12–8
Cincinnati	3–3	4–3	11–8	—	3–3	1–5	6–1	8–11	3–4	3–4	7–12	5–2	4–3	7–12	1–5	9–11
Colorado	10–9	3–3	3–3	3–3	—	4–15	5–2	5–2	2–4	3–4	2–5	11–8	7–12	2–5	3–4	8–12
Los Angeles	11–8	4–2	4–3	5–1	15–4	—	5–1	4–3	5–2	5–2	6–0	13–6	12–7	3–4	4–3	10–10
Miami	4–3	4–15	1–6	1–6	2–5	1–5	—	2–5	6–13	10–9	3–3	4–2	3–3	3–4	4–15	9–11
Milwaukee	5–2	3–3	10–9	11–8	2–5	3–4	5–2	—	5–1	4–3	15–4	3–4	2–4	9–10	4–2	8–12
New York	5–2	8–11	2–5	4–3	4–2	2–5	13–6	1–5	—	7–12	5–1	3–3	3–4	2–5	12–7	15–5
Philadelphia	2–4	10–9	5–2	4–3	4–3	2–5	9–10	3–4	12–7	—	4–2	3–3	3–4	4–2	5–14	11–9
Pittsburgh	1–6	2–5	8–11	12–7	5–2	0–6	3–3	4–15	1–5	2–4	—	6–1	5–2	5–14	3–4	12–8
San Diego	8–11	2–5	3–4	2–5	8–11	6–13	2–4	4–3	3–3	3–3	1–6	—	9–10	4–2	4–3	11–9
San Francisco	9–10	2–5	2–4	3–4	12–7	7–12	3–3	4–2	4–3	4–3	2–5	10–9	—	3–4	1–5	11–9
St. Louis	3–3	2–4	10–9	12–7	5–2	4–3	4–3	10–9	5–2	2–4	14–5	2–4	4–3	—	5–2	9–11
Washington	3–4	8–11	4–2	5–1	4–3	3–4	15–4	2–4	7–12	14–5	4–3	3–4	5–1	2–5	—	14–6

=== Opening Day starters ===
Name	Pos.
Albert Almora, Jr.	CF
Kris Bryant	3B
Anthony Rizzo	1B
Javier Baez	SS
Willson Contreras	C
David Bote	2B
Ben Zobrist	DH
Jason Heyward	RF
Mark Zagunis	LF
Jon Lester	SP

=== Season summary ===
==== March ====
- **March 9** – The Cubs announced Jon Lester will be the opening day starter on March 28 against the Texas Rangers at Globe Life Park.
- **March 28** – On Opening Day, Javier Báez hit two home runs and drove in four runs and the Cubs easily defeated the Rangers 12–4. Jon Lester allowed two runs in six innings of work. Kris Bryant also homered and drove in three runs in the easy win.
- **March 30** – Following a scheduled off day, the Cubs jumped out early on the Rangers and led 3–0 after the first. Yu Darvish struggled and only pitched 2.2 innings while walking seven and giving up three runs. José Quintana, slated as the fifth starter in the Cubs rotation, relieved and pitched four innings while allowing two runs. Kyle Schwarber homered and had three hits as did Willson Contreras. However, Carl Edwards Jr. walked two and gave up a three-run homer in the eighth as the Cubs lost 8–6.
- **March 31** – In game three against the Rangers, Cole Hamels gave up five runs in five innings of work including a grand slam to Delino DeShields Jr. The Cub bullpen also gave up five runs. The Cub offense continued its hot start as Anthony Rizzo and Schwarber each homered. Trailing 10–9 in the eighth, Daniel Descalso then drove in Báez to tie it, but Pedro Strop threw a wild pitch in the bottom of the ninth to allow the winning run to score as the Cubs lost 11–10. Despite scoring 28 runs in the three-game series, the Cubs left Texas with a 1–2 record.

==== April ====
- **April 1** – Kyle Hendricks started for the Cubs as they visited the Atlanta Braves at Sun Trust Park. The Cubs committed six errors in the game and were blown out 8–0, falling to 1–3 on the season.
- **April 3** – Following a scheduled off day, Jon Lester pitched six innings while allowing only two runs. He left with a 4–2 lead on the strength of a Willson Contreras two-run homer. However, the Cub bullpen imploded again as Steve Cishek walked the first three batters in the eighth and Randy Rosario gave up a bases-clearing double to give the Braves a 5–4 lead. The Cubs would go on to lose 6–4.
- **April 4** – Cubs pitching continued to struggle as the Braves jumped out to 9–0 lead against Yu Darvish and several relievers. The Cubs managed to score four runs in the ninth as Anthony Rizzo and Javier Báez hit back-to-back home runs, but it was not enough as the Cubs lost their fifth straight game 9–4.
- **April 5** – The Milwaukee Brewers out-slugged the Cubs in their first clash of the season. Down 13–5, the Cubs rallied, but fell short losing 13–10. Starting pitcher José Quintana lasted only three innings in the loss.
- **April 6** – Jason Heyward had his first multi-homer game as a Cub and Cole Hamels pitched six innings as the Cubs took an early 7–2 lead. A seven-run inning for the Cubs gave the Cub bullpen the cushion it needed as it continued to struggle, giving up six runs in four innings. Javier Báez and Victor Caratini homered for the Cubs in the 14–8 win over the Brewers.
- **April 7** – Kyle Hendricks lasted only four innings and gave up all four Milwaukee runs in Chicago's seventh loss of the season. Willson Contreras hit his third home run of the season, but the Cubs could manage only two runs in the 4–2 loss.
- **April 8** – The Cubs returned home to face the Pittsburgh Pirates for opening day at Wrigley Field. The Cubs jumped to an early lead following three errors by Pirate shortstop Kevin Newman in the third inning. Kyle Schwarber homered for the Cubs in the 10–0 win. Jon Lester left the game after pitching three-plus innings with a hamstring issue and the Cub bullpen held the Pirates scoreless for six innings.
- **April 10** – Yu Darvish allowed five runs in 5.1 innings of work, but the Cub offense struggled with the frigid weather conditions, managing only two runs on six hits. The 5–2 loss to the Pirates dropped the Cubs to 3–8 on the season.
- **April 11** – Starter José Quintana pitched into the seventh inning with 11 strikeouts and gave up just four hits in the Cubs win 2–0 over the Pirates. Pedro Strop got his first save. Daniel Descalso and Victor Caratini each had two hits and an RBI.
- **April 12** – The Cubs scored three runs in the first inning and went on to beat the Mike Trout-less Los Angeles Angels 5–1. Cole Hamels secured his second win by pitching well. Anthony Rizzo hit a first inning two run homer, Willson Contreras added two solo home runs, and David Bote also homered in the win
- **April 13** – A late inning rally fell short as the Angels beat the Cubs 6–5. Javier Báez hit three doubles but four walks by Cub relievers allowed two runs to score in the top of the sixth inning. A Mark Zagunis pinch-hit single scored two runs in the eight inning to narrow the lead. A ninth inning Angel error led to another Cub run but, with runners at second and third, Willson Contreras struck out. A check-swing third strike call on Kyle Schwarber ended the game as the Cubs lost 6–5. The Cubs record fell to 5–9.
- **April 15** – After the prior day's game being postponed due to snow, the Cubs traveled to Miami to face the Marlins. With the Cubs scoring three runs in the first inning, Yu Darvish pitched into the fifth inning allowing only two runs and striking out eight. Javier Báez hit his 100th double, WillsonContreras hits his sixth home run of the season, and the bullpen pitched well for a 7–2 victory.
- **April 16** – José Quintana pitched into the seventh inning and Javier Báez had his third three-hit game in a row including his fifth homer of the season. Daniel Descalso, David Bote, and Ben Zobrist drove in the other runs in the 4–0 shutout of the Marlins.
- **April 17** – Cole Hamels improved to 3–0 on the season, pitching seven innings while allowing three hits and striking out eight. Daniel Descalso continued his productive start with three RBI's. Jason Heyward drove in a run and Javier Báez drove in two with a double and his sixth home run on the season. The 6–0 victory was a sweep of the Marlins and improved the Cubs' record to 8–9.
- **April 19** – After an off day, the Cubs returned home to face the Arizona Diamondbacks. Kyle Hendricks pitched seven shutout innings while striking out 11 as the pitching staff continued its streak of good performances. Kris Bryant doubled in two runs in the second and scored a run as the Cubs won easily 5–1. The win returned the Cubs to the .500 mark on the season.
- **April 20** – Yu Darvish gave up three runs on five hits and walked three while the Cub bullpen also allowed three runs. The Cub offense was shut down by D-backs' start Zack Greinke and the Cubs lost 6–0, ending their four-game winning streak.
- **April 21** – Starting for the first time on the season, Tyler Chatwood pitched six scoreless innings and only walked two batters. Javier Báez tripled in a run in the sixth to give the Cubs a 1–0 lead. However, Pedro Strop gave up a solo home run in the ninth to blow his first save of the season. Báez then led off the ninth with a double and advanced to third on an error setting up David Bote's game-winning single as the Cubs won 2–1. The win again moved the Cubs to the .500 mark on the season.
- **April 23** – After another off day, the Cubs returned home to face the Los Angeles Dodgers. José Quintana continued his streak of good starts, pitching seven innings while only allowing two runs. Willson Contreras drove in three runs with a bases-clearing double in the first to give the Cubs an early lead. Anthony Rizzo hit a two-run homer and Javier Báez homered as well as the Cubs beat the Dodgers 7–2. The win moved the Cubs to one game above .500 for the first time since opening day.
- **April 24** – With Cole Hamels on the mound, the Cubs fell behind 3–0 entering the bottom of the sixth inning against the Dodgers. Javier Báez then connected on a three-run home run to tie the game at three. Three batters later, Jason Heyward hit his fifth home run of the season, a three-run shot to give the Cubs the 6–3 lead. Steve Cishek allowed a three-run homer in the eighth, but Pedro Strop notched the save as the Cubs won 7–6. The win moved the Cubs to a season-high two games over .500.
- **April 25** – Jon Lester returned from the IL and pitched five innings while allowing only one unearned run on an error by Javier Báez. The Cub bullpen allowed another run to score and the Cubs trailed the Dodgers 2–0 going in to the ninth. Albert Almora Jr. homered with two outs in the ninth, but it was not enough as the Cubs fell 2–1.
- **April 26** – The Cubs next traveled to Arizona to face the D-Backs. In the first game of the series, Kyle Hendricks gave up seven runs in five innings of work as the Cubs lost 8–3. Kris Byrant and Javier Báez both homered in the loss as the Cubs returned to .500 on the season.
- **April 27** – A day later, Yu Darvish pitched six innings while allowing only one run. David Bote hit two home runs and drove in five while Anthony Rizzo also homered as the Cubs routed the Diamondbacks 9–1.
- **April 28** – José Quintana was staked to an early 3–0 Cub lead behind home runs by Kris Bryant and Willson Contreras. However, Quintana surrendered three D-Back runs in two of his last three innings of work and left the game tied at three. The game went to extra innings where the Cubs had a plethora of opportunities to win the game, but failed to cash in until the 15th inning when Ben Zobrist doubled to drive in two runs. The Cubs added an insurance run on a Kris Bryant sacrifice fly to take a 6–3 lead to the bottom of the 15th. After two quick outs, Kyle Ryan then gave up two runs to narrow the lead to one, but Allen Webster got the final out to earn his first career save and give the Cubs a 6–5 win.
- **April 30** – The Cubs next traveled to Seattle for a two-game series against the Mariners. Daniel Descalso led off the game with his second home run of the season and Anthony Rizzo hit his sixth. Cole Hamels allowed four runs in 5.1 and the Cubs trailed 5–4 in the eighth inning. Kyle Schwarber hit a mammoth two-run homer to give the Cubs a 6–5 lead. Steve Cishek pitched a clean ninth and earned his first save of the year.

==== May ====
- **May 1** – The Cubs hit three home runs and cruised to an easy 11–0 victory in the finale against the Mariners, their fourth in a row. Javier Báez, Willson Contreras, Anthony Rizzo, and Ben Zobrist each had driven in two runs while Jason Heyward had three hits in the easy win. Jon Lester threw seven scoreless innings while allowing only one hit. The win marked the Cubs fifth in a row as they moved with 2.5 games of the division lead.
- **May 3** – After an off day, the Cubs returned home to face the first place St. Louis Cardinals. Anthony Rizzo's 199th career home run, a three-run homer, was all the Cubs needed as they beat the Cardinals 4–0. Kyle Hendricks pitched a complete game while allowing only four hits. He threw only 81 pitches, 63 of which were strikes, as the Cubs dominated the Cardinals and moved within a 1.5 games of first.
- **May 4** – The Cubs and Yu Darvish fell behind early against the Cardinals in game two of the series and trailed 5–1 in the fourth. Back-up catcher Taylor Davis hit his first career home run, a grand slam to tie the game at five. Javier Báez gave the Cubs the lead in the eighth with his 11th homer of the season. The 6–5 win moved the Cubs to within half a game of the Cardinals for first place and marked the Cubs sixth straight win.
- **May 5** – In spite of four errors, the Cubs easily beat the Cardinals to complete the sweep and earn their seventh straight win. The Cubs notched eight extra base hits, including a grand slam by Kris Bryant in a six-run eighth inning. Jose Quintana scattered eight hits in six innings while allowing only two runs. The win improved the Cubs to 19–12 on the season and moved them into first place in the Central Division.
- **May 6** – Riding a seven-game winning streak and in first place for the first time since opening day, the Cubs welcomed the Marlins to Wrigley. Cole Hamels allowed three runs in six innings, but left with a 4–3 lead behind a two-run homer by Anthony Rizzo and RBI singles by Willson Contreras and Kyle Schwarber. Pedro Strop walked the first two batters in the eighth and allowed a single to load the bases. A third walk forced in the tying run and Strop was removed from the game. The Marlins pushed across two more runs in the ninth to take a 6–4 lead. Kris Bryant homered in the ninth to narrow the lead to one and Rizzo singled to put the tying run on with one out, but Javier Báez and Contreras struck out to end the game. The loss dropped the Cubs out of first place.
- **May 7** – Jon Lester allowed two runs, none earned, on eight hits in six innings, but left with the game tied at two. The Cubs threatened to break the tie on several occasions in the late innings, but entered the ninth still tied. Kris Bryant removed all doubt, hitting a three-run home run in the bottom of the ninth to give the Cubs the 5–2 walk-off win and returned them to first place.
- **May 8** – Addison Russell made his first appearance of the season after being suspended for 40 games for domestic violence and started at second base for the Cubs. Kyle Hendricks gave up a run in the first and surrendered five hits, but lasted eight innings and left with a 2–1 Cub lead over the Marlins. However, the Cub bullpen surrendered the lead in the ninth without Pedro Strop who had been placed on the injured list prior to the game. The game went to extra innings tied at two before Jason Heyward hit a solo home run in the bottom of the 11th to mark a second straight walk-off home run game for the Cubs.
- **May 9** – In the final game of the series against the Marlins, Kris Bryant and Anthony Rizzo each homered and Mike Mongtomery pitched five scoreless innings in relief of Yu Darvish to notch his first win of the season. The 4–1 win kept the Cubs in first place and moved them to nine games over .500.
- **May 10** – With a 1.5 game lead over the Brewers, the Cubs welcomed Milwaukee to Wrigley for the first time on the season. Jose Quintana allowed three runs in 6.2 innings and the Cub bullpen fell apart, allowing four more runs as the Cubs were shut out 7–0. The win moved the Brewers to within half a game of the Cubs for first.
- **May 11** – Cole Hamels pitched seven innings and allowed only one run, but the Cubs went to extra innings against the Brewers tied at one. Tyler Chatwood pitched the final four innings of the game, striking out seven and Willson Contreras hit the game-winning home run in the bottom of the 15th to give the Cubs a 2–1 win.
- **May 12** – Appearing on Sunday Night Baseball for the second consecutive week, Jon Lester scattered nine hits and allowed one unearned run in 6.2 innings of work. Javier Báez and Willson Contreras each drove in a run and Kris Bryant hit a two-run home run in the seventh to give the Cubs the 4–1 win. The series win over the Brewers kept the Cubs in first place in the NL Central. Anthony Rizzo missed the game with a sore back.
- **May 14** – Following an off day, the Cubs traveled to Cincinnati to take on the Reds. Kyle Hendricks drove in two runs with a double in the second and pitched eight innings while allowing only one run. Willson Contreras also drove in the run as the Cubs beat the Reds 3–1. The win moved the Cubs to a season-high 11 games over .500. Anthony Rizzo missed his second straight game with a sore back.
- **May 15** – Addison Russell hit his first home run since returning to the Cubs from suspension while Albert Almora Jr. and Kyle Schwarber also homered for the Cubs against the Reds. Yu Darvish allowed two runs in 5.1 innings of work, but the Cub bullpen surrendered three runs in the seventh and eighth innings to force extra innings. In the 10th, the Cubs lost 6–5.
- **May 16** – In the final game of the series against the Reds, the Cubs scored two runs in the first, but failed to score the rest of the game. José Quintana gave up three runs before a rain delay and Tyler Chatwood allowed another run in two innings of work as the Cubs lost 4–2. The loss marked the Cubs first series loss since early April.
- **May 17** – A day later, the Cubs offense woke from its slumber in the previous game and scored 14 runs against the Washington Nationals in Washington D.C. Kris Bryant homered in three consecutive innings, the seventh, eighth, and ninth, marking his second three-home run game of his career. Kyle Schwarber, Albert Almora Jr, and Willson Contreras also homered for the Cubs as the scored 14 runs and blew out the Nationals 14–6.
- **May 18** – Facing Stephen Strasburg, the Cub offense again cooled off, managing only two runs on four hits. Meanwhile, Jon Lester struggled, allowing five runs on 10 hits in 4.1 innings of work in the 5–2 loss to the Nationals.
- **May 19** – Playing on Sunday Night Baseball for the third consecutive week, the Cubs scored a run in each of the first four innings to take a 4–0 lead. The Cubs pushed the lead to 6–1 in the sixth, before Kyle Hendricks gave up a three-run home run. The Cub bullpen surrendered another run, but Steve Cishek pitched 2.1 innings of relief for the save as the Cubs beat the Nationals 6–5. Javier Báez left the game with a foot injury.
- **May 20** – Returning home, the Cubs faced their former pitcher Jake Arrieta and the Philadelphia Phillies. The Cubs took an early one-run lead on Anthony Rizzo RBI single. However, Yu Darvish allowed three runs in the sixth to surrender the lead. Trailing by two in the eighth, Daniel Descalso tripled in a run and scored on a throwing error to give the Cubs a 4–3 lead heading to the ninth. However, Brad Brach could not hold the lead and the Phillies tied it to force extra innings. A J.T. Realmuto home run in the 10th sealed the loss for the Cubs. Javier Báez missed the game due to a foot injury suffered the day before.
- **May 21** – José Quintana pitched six innings and allowed no runs, leaving the game with a 1–0 lead. However, Carl Edwards Jr. surrendered the lead in the seventh. Trailing 2–1 in the bottom of the ninth with the bases loaded, Albert Almora Jr. hit a weak ground ball to the pitcher, but Kris Bryant was able to beat the throw to the plate to score the tying run. Javier Báez, who did not start the game due to his foot injury, pinch hit and drove the first pitch to right field to drive in the winning run as the Cubs beat the Phillies 3–2.
- **May 22** – With temperatures near 80 and the wind blowing out, Cole Hamels struggled against his former team. The Phillies took a 3–0 lead before Anthony Rizzo hit a towering three-run home run in the third to tie it. Albert Almora Jr. broke the tie in the fifth with his first career grand slam. Javier Báez also homered for the Cubs. Hamels, who allowed nine hits and three runs, was lifted after four innings and replaced by Tyler Chatwood. Chatwood pitched four innings in relief while allowing one run and earned the win as the Cubs won 8–4. The win returned the Cubs to 11 games over the .500 mark as they led the division by two games.
- **May 23** – Jon Lester struggled again, allowing seven runs in four innings of work and leaving the game trailing 7–3. Trailing 8–3 in the seventh, Kyle Schwarber hit a two-run homer and Anthony Rizzo hit a solo homer to bring the Cubs within two. However, they could get no closer as the Phillies won 9–7.
- **May 24** – The Cubs welcomed the Reds to Wrigley Field for a three-game series. Kyle Hendricks pitched six innings and allowed three runs and left with the game tied at three. Willson Contreras singled to drive in the go-ahead run in the eighth, but Steve Cishek gave up a two-run homer to Eugenio Suárez in the ninth as the Cubs lost 6–5.
- **May 25** – Yu Darvish pitched seven innings despite allowing 12 hits and six runs and left the game with a 6–5 lead behind homers by Albert Almora Jr., Jason Heyward, and Addison Russell. Tyler Chatwood pitched the ninth to earn his first save of the season as the Cubs beat the Reds 8–6.
- **May 26** – José Quintana gave up 12 hits and six runs in five innings of work. The Cub bullpen also struggled, allowing fours runs in a 10–2 loss to the Reds. Kris Bryant and Jason Heywood collided in right field on a play in the sixth inning forcing Bryant to leave the game.
- **May 27** – The Cubs next traveled to Houston to face the Astros for a three-game series. In the first game of the series, Cole Hamels struggled, allowing six runs in four innings of work. The Cub bullpen, however, pitched five innings of scoreless relief. However, despite home runs by Anthony Rizzo, Albert Almora Jr., and Addison Russell, the Cubs fell to the Astros 6–5. Kris Bryant and Jason Heyward sat out the game after running into each other in the outfield the previous day.
- **May 28** – Jon Lester struggled for the third consecutive start, giving up seven runs in 5.2 innings of work. Brad Brach struggled as well, allowing two runs in 1.1 innings of work. As a result, despite hitting five home runs in the games (Jason Heyward, Addison Russell, David Bote twice, and Kyle Schwarber), the Cubs lost to the Astros 9–6. Kris Bryant missed his second straight game following a collision with Jason Heyward in the outfield.
- **May 29** – Kyle Hendricks pitches eight strong innings and allowed only one run. Kyle Schwarber and Kris Bryant, in his return to the lineup, each homered as the Cubs held on for the 2–1 win over the Astros to avoid the sweep. The Cubs set a team record with 50 home runs in a month.
- **May 31** – The Cubs traveled to St. Louis to face the Cardinals and Yu Darvish pitched well, allowing only one run on three hits in six innings. Darvish also drove in the Cubs only run of the game with sacrifice fly in the second inning. The game remained tied into the 10th inning, when the Matt Carpenter singled with the bases loaded to give the Cardinals the 2–1 win. The loss reduced the Cubs' division lead to half a game over the Brewers.

==== June ====
- **June 1** – José Quintana pitched four innings and allowed two runs before being forced from the game following a three and a half hour rain delay. The Cubs entered the rain delay tied at two on the strength of home runs by Anthony Rizzo and Jason Heyward. Resuming play around 11:30 pm local time, Tyler Chatwood allowed three runs in two innings as the Cubs fell to the Cardinals 7–4. The loss dropped the Cubs to half a game out of first, behind the Brewers. Javier Báez missed the game as he continued to struggle with a foot injury.
- **June 2** – Cole Hamels pitched seven innings while allowing only one unearned run and left trailing 1–0. Brad Brach surrendered a run in the eighth to put the Cubs down two to the Cardinals entering the ninth inning. Willson Contreras walked with one out and moved to third on a Jason Heyward single. An Addison Russell groundout moved the score to 2–1, but David Bote struck out to end the game as the Cubs were swept by the Cardinals and fell 1.5 games out for first place in the division.
- **June 3** – In a make-up game for an earlier snowed out game, the Cubs routed the Los Angeles Angels by a score of 8–1. Jon Lester, after struggling his previous three starts, allowed one run in seven innings of work. Javier Báez homered and drove in three while Jason Heyward drove in two runs. Willson Contreras homered as well in the win. Newly signed Carlos Gonazalez made his Cub debut and drove in a run.
- **June 4** – Kyle Hendricks struck out ten Colorado Rockies in seven innings in a 6–3 victory. Kyle Scharber and Javier Báez each homered in the win while Carlos González drove in two runs. Pedro Strop returned to the lineup to pitch a perfect ninth and record the save. The win moved the Cubs in to a tie for first in the division with the Brewers.
- **June 5** – Yu Darvish allowed three runs in 5.1 innings of work and the Cubs were led by David Bote career-high seven RBI, including a three-run home run. Up 8–3, the Cub bullpen struggled, but the Cubs held on for the 9–8 win. The Cubs moved one game ahead of Milwaukee in the NL Central.
- **June 6** – José Quintana pitched 7.1 innings, but allowed three runs. The Cub offense struggled against Rockies' starter Peter Lambert making his MLB debut. Javier Báez drove in the only Cub run as the Rockies avoided the sweep, winning 3–1.
- **June 7** – A two-run home run by Javier Báez in the first inning was all Cole Hamels needed as the Cubs welcomed the Cardinals to Wrigley Field. Hamels allowed no runs in eight innings before yielding to Pedro Strop in the ninth. Strop allowed a Paul DeJong home run, but held on for the 3–1 victory.
- **June 8** – Jon Lester surrendered four runs in the first inning, but did not allow another run in six innings of work. Victor Caratini hit a tie-breaking bases-loaded double in Chicago's four-run sixth inning as the Cubs rallied to beat the Cardinals 9–4. Kyle Schwarber homered and drove in two in the win.
- **June 9** – Kyle Hendricks continued his streak of strong performances, pitching seven innings while scattering eight hits and allowing only one run. Carlos González hit his first home run as a cub and Kyle Schwarber drove in two runs as the Cubs beat the Cardinals 5–1 and earned a second series sweep of the Cardinals on the season.
- **June 10** – The Cubs returned to the road to face the Rockies in Denver. Kyle Schwarber and Anthony Rizzo both hit two-run homers in the Cubs’ third inning, but Yu Darvish quickly surrendered the lead in the bottom half of the inning. The Rockies took the lead in the seventh, but the Cubs rallied to tie it in the eighth. Steve Cishek then surrendered the lead in the bottom half of the eighth as the Cubs fell short and lost 6–5.
- **June 11** – José Quintana struggled, allowing four runs in 4.2 innings. The Cub bullpen fared no better, allowing six more Rockies' runs as the Cubs were blown out 10–3. The loss marked the Cubs' fifth consecutive road loss.
- **June 12** – Cole Hamels pitches seven shutout innings against the Rockies and drove in two runs as the Cubs avoided the series sweep. Kyle Schwarber hit a three-run home run and Javier Báez added a two-run shot as the Cubs rolled to an easy 10–1 win over the Rockies.
- **June 13** – The Cubs next visited Los Angeles to visit the Dodgers, holders of the best record in the National League. The Cubs jumped to an early three-run lead in the first game of the series behind a two-run homer by Kyle Schwarber and a solo homer by Kris Bryant. However, Jon Lester struggled again, giving up six runs in five innings as the Cubs lost to the Dodgers 7–3.
- **June 14** – In game two of the series, the Cubs again took an early lead, this time on a two-run homer by Anthony Rizzo. However, Kyle Hendricks struggled, allowing five runs in only 4.1 innings. Kris Bryan homered for the second straight game for the Cubs, but it was not enough as they lost to the Dodgers 5–3.
- **June 15** – Yu Darvish pitched well, allowing only one run in seven innings. However, the Cub offense failed to score through eight innings. In the ninth, Anthony Rizzo hit a two-run home run to rally the Cubs past the Dodgers 2–1.
- **June 16** – In the final game of the series against the Dodgers, José Quintana gave up two runs in five innings, but the Cubs rallied to tie it in the sixth on an RBI single by Willson Contreras and a sacrifice fly by David Bote. Steve Cishek again gave up the go-ahead run in the bottom of the eighth and, though the Cubs had runners on second and third with one out in the ninth, the Cubs lost 3–2.
- **June 18** – Cole Hamels continued to pitch well as the Cubs welcomed the Chicago White Sox to Wrigley Field. Hamels allowed one run in seven innings, but left with the game tied at one as the Cub offense struggled. Still tied at one in the ninth, Eloy Jiménez, who had been traded by the Cubs for José Quitana two years prior, hit a two-run homer to give the White Sox the 3–1 win.
- **June 19** – Facing likely AL All-Star starting pitcher Lucas Gioloto, the Cubs pounded out seven runs including a first-inning grand slam by Willson Contreras. Contreras homered again in the third and David Bote also homered as the Cubs won 7–3, splitting the two-game series against the White Sox.
- **June 20** – The following day, the New York Mets paid a visit to Wrigley to start a four-game series. With Kyle Hendricks on the DL, Tyler Chatwood started for the Cubs and allowed three runs in four innings. Adbert Alzolay, making his Major League debut, pitched four-plus innings of relief and allowed only one run, earning the win for the Cubs. Javier Baez homered and drove in two runs while Anthony Rizzo drove in two as well giving the Cubs the 7–4 win.
- **June 21** – In game two against the Mets, Yu Darvish failed to build on his prior good start, allowing four runs in six innings. Addison Russell homered to give the Cubs a 4–3 lead in the fifth, but Darvish surrendered the lead for the second time in the game in the sixth. In the seventh, Brad Brach allowed a run-scoring single and the Cubs lost 5–4.
- **June 22** – José Quitana allowed nine runs, eight earned, as the Cubs were blown out by the Mets 10–2.
- **June 23** – Javier Báez hit a three-run home run in the eighth to give the Cubs a 5–3 win over the Mets in the final game of the series. Cole Hamels pitched well for the Cubs, lasting seven innings and allowing only three runs. The win kept the Cubs half a game ahead of the Brewers in the Central.
- **June 24** – The Atlanta Braves came to Chicago for a four-game series. In the first game, Willson Contreras and Jason Heyward homered and the Cubs used a five-run fifth inning to beat the Braves 8–3. Contreras drove in three runs in the game and Jon Lester pitched well, allowing only two unearned runs in six innings. The win moved the Cubs a full game ahead of the Brewers for first in the Central.
- **June 25** – Adbert Alzolay started his first game and gave up a first-pitch home run to Ronald Acuna Jr., but pitched well from there, allowing no more runs and pitching into the fifth. The Cubs took the lead in the fourth on a two-RBI double by Willson Contreras. However, Mike Mongtomery gave up a two-run home run in the seventh and the Cubs could muster no further offense, losing 3–2. The Cubs remained a game ahead of the Brewers despite the loss.
- **June 26** – Yu Darvish gave up five runs in five innings of work while the Willson Contreras and Kris Bryant homered for the Cubs. However, it was not enough as the Cubs lost to the Braves 5–3.
- **June 27** – Looking to avoid the sweep, Tyler Chatwood struggled in his third start on the season, allowing six runs in five innings. However, the Cubs rallied to score nine runs as Victor Caratini homered twice and Kyle Schwarber also homered. Jason Heyward also drove in three runs. Newly acquired relief pitcher Craig Kimbrel made his Cubs debut and pitched a shaky ninth to earn his first save as a Cub in the 9–7 win over the Braves.
- **June 28** – The Cubs next traveled to Cincinnati to take on the Reds. Cole Hamels left after one inning with an oblique injury and Mike Montgomery gave up five runs in 2.1 innings as the Cubs lost 6–3.
- **June 29** – José Quintana scattered six hits in six innings of scoreless work while Jason Heyward hit a solo home run in the second to give the Cubs a 1–0 lead. With the Cubs still holding to the 1–0 lead in the eighth, Javier Báez hit a grand slam to push the lead to 5–0. The Cubs would go on to beat the Reds 6–0.
- **June 30** – Jon Lester gave up three runs in the first and four runs in five innings as the Cubs trailed the Reds 4–0 heading to the seventh. Albert Almora Jr. drove in the Cubs' first run in the seventh and Kyle Scharber homered to draw the Cubs within 4–3. However, Dillon Maples and Kyle Ryan allowed three runs in the eighth. A three-run Jason Heyward homer in the ninth narrowed the lead, but the Cubs fell 8–6.

==== July ====
- **July 1** – The Cubs next traveled to Pittsburgh to face the Pirates. Adbert Alzolay made his second career start and was shelled, allowing seven runs in 2.2 innings. The Cub bullpen fared no better, allowed 11 runs in 5.1 innings of relief. Javier Báez hit his 21st homer on the season, but it was not enough as the Cubs were blown out 18–5.
- **July 2** – Kyle Hendricks returned to the mound for the Cubs, but gave up two runs in three innings before a rain delay ended his night. The Cub bullpen allowed three more runs as the Cubs were again blown out by the Pirates 5–1.
- **July 3** – The Cubs took an early lead on a Victor Caratini solo home run, but Yu Darvish allowed four runs in 6.2 innings to surrender the lead. The Cubs retook the lead in the seventh on a second homer by Caratini. In the ninth, Craig Kimbrel allowed two runs to blow the save as the Cubs lost their third straight to the Pirates 6–5.
- **July 4** – In the final game of the four-game series against the Pirates, the Cubs took an early lead and cruised to an easy win. Robel Garcia homered in his second game as a Cub and Kris Bryant, Albert Almora Jr., and Willson Contreras also homered in the 11–3 win. José Quintana earned the win while pitching seven innings and allowing three runs. Joe Maddon was ejected in the fourth inning after getting upset by inside pitches by Pirate pitchers.
- **July 6** – After a rare Friday off day, the Cubs returned to Chicago to face the White Sox at Guaranteed Rate Field. The Cubs used a five-run fifth to take the lead as Javier Báez, Kris Bryant, and Anthony Rizzo each drove in two runs. The White Sox managed only three runs as the Cubs won 6–3.
- **July 7** – On the final day before the All-Star break, Kyle Hendricks gave up four runs in four innings as the Cub offense again struggled. A seventh inning solo home run by Robel Garcia marked the only run for the Cubs as they lost to the White Sox 3–1. The Cubs remained in first place by half a game over the Brewers at the All-Star break.
- **July 12** – The Cubs returned home following the All-Star break to face the Pirates at Wrigley Field. Yu Darvish pitched well, striking out eight and allowing no runs in six innings of work. However, he left the game with the game scoreless. In the bottom of the seventh, Kris Bryant homered, Robel Garcia drove in a run on a sacrifice fly, David Bote drew a walk with the bases loaded as the Cubs took a 3–0 lead. However, in the top of the eighth, Pedro Strop gave up a three-run homer to Starling Marte to tie the game. Jason Heyward gave the Cubs the lead again in the bottom half of the eight on a single that drove in Bryant. Craig Kimbrel pitched a perfect ninth to nail down the 4–3 win. The win moved the Cubs 1.5 games ahead of the Brewers for the division lead.
- **July 13** – In game two of the series against the Pirates, the Cubs batted around and scored seven runs in the first inning. Willson Contreras hit a three-run homer, Javier Báez doubled in a run, and Anthony Rizzo and Jon Lester each drove in a run with a single to give the Cubs the early lead. The Cubs pushed the lead to 10–0 on a Jon Lester home run in the third and a two-run scoring double by Addison Russell in the fourth. Lester pitched well, allowing three runs in 6.2 innings as the Cubs won easily 10–4. The win kept the Cubs 1.5 games ahead of the Brewers in the division.
- **July 14** – In the series finale, the Cubs took an early 1–0 lead on a second inning Robel Garcia double. However, José Quintana would surrender three runs in the third as the Cubs fell behind 3–1. Quintana would partially atone for the runs he allowed, driving in a run in the fourth on a single. Victor Caratini tied the game on a sacrifice fly in the fifth and Jason Heyward gave the Cubs the lead for good with a two-run homer. Leading 5–3 in the sixth, Albert Almora Jr. and Kyle Schwarber hit back-to-back solo home runs while Anthony Rizzo drove in another run with a sacrifice fly. The Cub bullpen would hold the lead as the Cubs beat the Pirates 8–3. The win moved the Cubs to 2.5 games ahead of the Brewers in the division.
- **July 15** – The Reds were the Cubs next opponent for the Cubs at Wrigley, and they took an early 1–0 lead off of Kyle Hendricks in the first. Hendricks went on to allow two runs in six innings. A Kyle Schwarber homer tied the game for the Cubs in the third. The Cubs took the lead on a Jason Heyward groundout and a wild pitch in the fourth. With the Cubs lead 3–2 in the seventh, Steve Cishek gave up a home run and a David Bote error allowed another run to score as the Cubs fell down 4–3. The Reds added two more runs in the eighth and the Cubs lost 6–3.
- **July 16** – Alec Mills made his first start of the season as the newly acquired Martin Maldonando also started at catcher for the Cubs in game two against the Reds. Mills allowed three runs, all in the first, in a six inning start. The Cubs narrowed the lead to 3–2 in the second on a two-run home run by Robel Garcia. The Cubs tied it in the sixth on a Kris Bryant homer in the sixth. The game remained tied through nine innings before Kyle Schwarber hit a solo home run in the bottom of the 10th to beat the Reds 4–3. The win kept the Cubs's lead in the division at 2.5 games.
- **July 17** – Kris Bryant and Addison Russell hit solo home runs to stake Yu Darvish to an early 2–0 lead. Darvish again pitched well, pitching six scoreless innings. Jason Heyward drove in two runs with a seventh inning double and Anthony Rizzo also drove in a run in the eighth to push the lead to 5–2. Craig Kimbrel pitched a perfect ninth to secure the win over the Reds. The win marked Darvish's first win at Wrigley Field as a Cub. With a Brewers win later that day, the division lead remained at 2.5 games.
- **July 19** – After an off day, the Cubs welcomed the San Diego Padres to Wrigley. The Padres jumped out to an early 3–0 lead against Jon Lester. However, Anthony Rizzo hit a grand slam in the bottom of the third, his first homer since June 15, to give the Cubs a 4–3 lead. Lester, who surrendered 12 hits in six innings, surrendered the lead again in the fifth, but a Javier Báez homer gave the Cubs a 5–4 lead in the bottom half. Pedro Strop continued to struggle and gave up a home run on the first pitch of the eighth to again tie the game. However, the Cubs retook the lead in the bottom of the half on an error by Padre first baseman Eric Hosmer. Craig Kimbrel pitched a scoreless ninth for his fifth save as a Cub.
- **July 20** – The Cubs took an early 2–0 lead on the Padres on an Anthony Rizzo groundout and Robel Garcia triple in the first inning. José Quintana relinquished the lead in the third, allowing two homers. Rizzo drove in a run in the bottom of the third on a single, but Quintana again gave up the lead in the fourth. However, Javier Báez gave the Cubs the lead again in the bottom of the fourth with a three-run homer. Quintana surrendered another homer run in the fifth, but the Cub bullpen held the lead as the Cubs won 6–5. The win moved the Cubs to three games in front of the Brewers for the division lead.
- **July 21** – Kyle Hendricks pitched seven strong innings and allowed only two runs, but the Cub offense could only manage an RBI-groundout by Anthony Rizzo in the first. The Cub bullpen imploded in the ninth, surrendering three runs as the Cubs fell 5–1. The loss moved the division lead to two games over the Brewers.
- **July 22** – Alec Mills made his second start of the season for the Cubs as they visited the San Francisco Giants in San Francisco. Mills allowed two runs in 4.1 innings, but left with the lead on the strength of home runs by Robel Garcia and Kyle Schwarber and an RBI-single by Albert Almora Jr. An Anthony Rizzo double in the eighth pushed the Cub lead to 4–2, but Pedro Strop blew the lead in the bottom of the eighth, giving up three runs as the Cubs lost 5–4. The loss reduced the Cubs' division lead to 1.5 games over the Cardinals.
- **July 23** – Facing the Giants' Madison Bumgarner, the Cubs took an early 2–1 lead on RBI-singles by Kris Bryant in the first and third. However, Yu Darvish allowed three runs in the fourth to give the Giants a 4–2 lead. A Victor Caratini single in the seventh narrowed the lead and Jason Heyward tied it with a single in the eighth. The game went to extra innings and the Cubs failed to get any runners on base through the 13th. In the bottom of the 13th, Pablo Sandoval homered to win the game for the Giants.
- **July 24** – In the final game of the series, the Cubs jumped to an early 3–0 lead on home runs by Javier Báez and Kris Bryant. Tyler Chatwood, starting in place of Jon Lester who missed the game because he was ill, allowed one run in four innings of work. The Cub bullpen held the Giants scoreless as Craig Kimbrel earned his seventh save as a Cub in the 4–1 win.
- **July 26** – After an off day, the Cubs traveled to Milwaukee to face the Brewers with a slim one-game lead over the Cardinals in the division. Kyle Hendricks held the Brewers scoreless through five innings before he was lifted from the game. The Cubs took the lead in the sixth on a two-run homer by David Bote. However, the Cub bullpen then allowed three runs to give up the lead and the Cubs lost 3–2. The loss moved the Cubs into a first place tie with the Cardinals.
- **July 27** – Jon Lester pitched seven innings while allowing no runs as the Cubs again took the lead, this time on a two-run home run by Anthony Rizzo, against the Brewers. However, once again, the Cub bullpen fell apart, allowing two runs in the eighth to force extra innings. Albert Almora Jr. homered in the top of the 10th, but Craig Kimbrel allowed a home run in the bottom half by Christian Yelich to tie the game. Keston Hiura homered two batters later as Kimbrel failed to record an out and the Cubs lost 5–3. The loss moved the Cubs to a game behind the Cardinals in the division.
- **July 28** – In the final game of the series against the Brewers, Kyle Schwarber hit a grand slam in the second and a three-run home run in the fourth to give the Cubs a 7–0 lead. José Quintana surrendered three runs in the fifth before being pulled from the game, but the Cubs extended the lead to seven again on a three-run homer by Victor Caratini. The win moved the Cubs back into a first-place tie with the Cardinals with the Brewers one game behind in the division.
- **July 30** – After another off day, the Cubs traveled to St. Louis to take on the Cardinals. Yu Darvish continued to pitch well for the Cubs, allowing two runs in six innings. However, the Cub offense managed only one run on a Javier Báez single as the Cubs lost and fell a game behind the Cardinals in the division.
- **July 31** – Kyle Hendricks pitched seven innings and allowed no runs while scattering seven hits. Ian Happ drove in his first run of the season on a single in the sixth and Javier Báez scored in the eighth from second on an attempted pick off to give the Cubs a 2–0 lead. Craig Kimbrel allowed a single and double in the bottom of the ninth, but induced a weak grounder and struck out Yairo Munoz to end the game. The win moved the Cubs back in to a first-place tie with the Cardinals.

==== August ====
- **August 1** – In the final game of the series against the Cardinals, Jon Lester allowed five runs in five innings while the Cub bullpen surrendered an additional three runs. The Cubs were blown out 8–0. The loss moved the Cubs to 21–33 on the road and dropped the Cubs a game behind the Cardinals in the division.
- **August 2** – The Cubs returned home to face the Brewers at Wrigley. Jason Heyward hit his first lead-off home run as a Cub and Javier Báez also homered and drove in three as the Cubs beat the Brewers 6–2. José Quintana pitched well, allowing only two runs in six innings. The win moved the Cubs to within a half game of the Cardinals for the division lead.
- **August 3** – Cole Hamels made his first appearance since leaving with a strained oblique in June and pitched five scoreless innings. Javier Báez scored on a wild pitch in the second to give the Cubs a 1–0 lead, but newly acquired David Phelps surrendered the lead in the sixth. With the game tied at one in the seventh, Albert Almora Jr. hit a solo home run to give the Cubs the lead and drove in a run on a sacrifice fly in the eighth. A Báez single plated another run and the Cubs beat the Brewers 4–1. The win moved the Cubs half a game ahead of the Cardinals for the division lead.
- **August 4** – Going for the sweep against the Brewers with Yu Darvish on the mound, the Cubs took the lead on a homer and a run-scoring triple by Jason Heyward. Nicholas Castellanos singled to drive in Heyward as the Cubs took an early 3–1 lead in the second. Kyle Schwarber homered while Tony Kemp and David Bote also drove in runs as the Cubs thumped the Brewers 7–2. Tyler Chatwood pitched the final three innings for the win. Coupled with a Cardinals' loss later in the day, the Cubs moved their division lead to 1.5 games.
- **August 5** – The Oakland A's next visited Wrigley. Nicholas Castellanos hit his first homer as a Cub in the first, but Kyle Hendricks surrendered a two-run homer to Marcus Semien in the third to give the A's a 2–1 lead. Javier Báez tied it in the sixth on a solo home run and Ian Happ hit his first homer on the season for the Cubs in the seventh to give the Cubs a 3–2 lead. Later in the seventh, Castellanos doubled in a run before Báez hit his second homer of the game to give the Cubs a 6–2 lead. Steve Cishek struggled, giving up three runs in the eighth, but the Cub bullpen was able to stop the bleeding and the Cubs held on for the 6–5 dub. The win pushed the Cubs' division lead to 2.5 games over the Cardinals.
- **August 6** – Jon Lester gave up 11 runs, 10 earned, in four innings of work as the Cubs were blown out by the A's 11–4. Kris Bryant homered and drove in two runs while Kyle Schwarber also drove in two runs in the loss.
- **August 7** – José Quintana continued to pitch well, allowing only one run in seven innings against the A's. Ian Happ hit a grand slam in the fourth while Kyle Schwarber and Victor Caratini also homered as the Cubs routed the A's 10–1.
- **August 8** – The Cubs returned to the road to face the Reds. Cole Hamels struggled, giving up five runs in three innings of work, but the Cub bullpen pitched well as the Cubs blew out the Reds 12–5. Nicholas Castellanos homered twice and Ian Happ homered and drove in four in the drubbing of the Reds. The win pushed the Cubs' division lead to 3.5 games.
- **August 9** – Yu Darvish allowed four runs in six innings while the Cubs only managed one run, a Nicholas Castellanos home run, against Reds' starter Trevor Bauer. Anthony Rizzo drove in a run in the eighth with the bases loaded and no outs on a hit by pitch, but the Cubs failed to score another run in the inning. As a result, the Cubs lost 5–2.
- **August 10** – Kyle Hendricks lasted only 2.2 innings while giving up seven runs against the Reds. The Cub bullpen surrendered three more runs as the Cubs were blown out 10–1. Kyle Schwarber homered for the Cubs in the loss.
- **August 11** – In the final game of the series against the Reds, Jon Lester gave up three runs in five innings and left trailing 3–0. Javier Báez drove in a run in the sixth with an RBI double to narrow the lead to 3–1. In the seventh, Tony Kemp drove in a run on a groundout and Kris Bryant hit a three-run home run to give the Cubs a 5–3 lead. Rowan Wick pitched two innings of shutout relief and Pedro Strop pitched the ninth to earn the save.
- **August 13** – After an off day, the Cubs traveled to Philadelphia to take on the Phillies. Jose Quintana struck out a career-high 14 batters and allowed only two runs in six innings. However, the Cub offense struggled once again, managing only two runs on a Nicholas Castellanos homer and a Javier Báez RBI sacrifice fly. The Cub bullpen gave up two more runs and the Cubs lost 4–2. The loss narrowed the Cubs' division lead over the Cardinals to one game.
- **August 14** – Cole Hamels continued to struggle as he was pounded by his former team, giving up eight runs in two innings to the Phillies. The Cubs managed only a Kris Bryant solo home run as they lost 11–1. The loss moved the Cubs into a first-place tie with the Cardinals.
- **August 15** – Looking to avoid the series sweep, Yu Darvish pitched well, striking out 10 in seven innings of work and not allowing a run. The Cub offense pushed across five runs on homers by Anthony Rizzo and Kyle Schwarber. RBI singles by Albert Almora Jr. and Rizzo and an RBI double by David Bote gave the Cubs a 5–0 lead. The Cub bullpen allowed one run in the eighth, but the Cubs still led 5–1 going into the ninth. However, Rowan Wick, Pedro Strop, and Derek Holland fell apart in the ninth giving up six runs, including Holland allowing the game-ending grand slam to Bryce Harper as the Cubs lost 7–5. The Cubs remained tied in first with the Cardinals despite the loss.
- **August 16** – The Cubs next traveled to Pittsburgh to face the struggling Pirates. Kyle Hendricks pitched well, allowing only one run in seven innings of work. However, the Cub offense managed nothing until the eighth inning when Tony Kemp tripled to score two runs and give the Cubs the 2–1 lead. In the ninth, Kyle Ryan allowed a single with one out and was relieved by Brandon Kintzler. Kintzler retired the first batter he faced and intentionally walked Josh Bell. An unintentional walk followed and loaded the based before Kintzler walked another batter to force in the tying run. Kevin Newman then singled in the winning run as the Cubs blew another lead. The loss moved the Cubs to second place, a game behind the Cardinals.
- **August 17** – In game two of the series against the Pirates, the Cubs again struggled to score before Kris Bryant homered in the seventh and Ian Happ scored on an errant pick-off play in the eighth to give the Cubs a 2–0 lead. Rowan Wick pitched a perfect ninth for the save and the Cubs returned to a first-place tie with the Cardinals.
- **August 18** – The Cubs and Pirates next traveled to Williamsport, PA to participate in the Little League Classic at BB&T Ballpark at Historic Bowman Field. The Cub offense finally broke out, scoring seven runs in the first five innings behind home runs by Nicholas Castellanos, Jason Heyward, and Anthony Rizzo. Kyle Schwarber also drove in two runs as the Cubs held on for the 7–1 win. The win left the Cubs in a first-place tie with the Cardinals. The win also marked the Cubs first road series win since May.
- **August 20** – After an off day, the Cubs returned home to face the Giants. Cole Hamels allowed three runs in six innings while Nicholas Castellanos and Anthony Rizzo each hit solo home runs in the first. Rizzo added a second solo home run in the third and went 3–3 with three runs scored and two RBI. Jonathan Lucroy drove in the go-ahead run in the fifth and Tony Kemp extended the lead in the seventh with a sacrifice fly. The Cub bullpen allowed one base runner in three innings of relief as the Cubs won 5–3. The lost kept the Cubs one-half game behind the Cardinals for the division lead.
- **August 21** – The Cubs jumped out to an early lead over the Giants, scoring six runs in the first three innings behind two-run home runs by Nicholas Castellanos and Kyle Schwarber. Yu Darvish and Castellanos added run-scoring singles to give the Cubs a 6–2 lead after three. Darvish allowed two more runs in the fifth and five in the sixth to surrender the Cubs lead. Trailing 9–7 in the bottom of the sixth, the Cubs pushed across three more runs to retake the lead at 10–9. However, Tyler Chatwood relinquished the lead again in the seventh as the Giants took an 11–10 lead. Still trailing by one in the bottom of the eighth, Castellanos walked to lead off the inning and Kris Bryant homered to give the Cubs the lead once again. Craig Kimbrel pitched a perfect ninth for the save as the Cubs won 12–11. Following a Cardinals' loss, the Cubs moved into sole possession of first place, half a game ahead of St. Louis.
- **August 22** – Kyle Hendricks pitched seven shutout innings and Anthony Rizzo drove in Jason Heyward on a single up the middle to score the only run of the game. The 1–0 win over the Giants kept the Cubs half a game ahead of the Cardinals in the division.
- **August 23** – The Nationals, winners of nine of their last 10 games, came to Wrigley and forced Jon Lester from the game in the fifth after giving up six runs. The Cubs managed only three runs, all in the bottom of the ninth, as the Cubs were blown out 9–3. The loss dropped the Cubs half a game behind the Cardinals for the division lead.
- **August 24** – José Quintana gave up five runs in four innings as the Nationals jumped all over the Cubs for a second straight game, taking 5–1 lead. An RBI-single by Nicholas Castellanos and a double by Jonathan Lucroy accounted for the Cubs only two runs as the Cubs lost again 7–2. The loss moved the Cubs 1.5 games out of the division lead. Anthony Rizzo left the game with back tightness.
- **August 25** – Looking to avoid the series sweep, Cole Hamels lasted five innings and allowed only two runs. However, Rowan Wick struggled, allowing three runs in seventh as the Cubs fell behind 5–2. A Victor Caratini homer in the bottom of the seventh reduced the lead to 5–3 and Kyle Schwarber tied it in the eighth with a two-run homer. In extra innings, the Nationals scored one run on a wild pitch by Tyler Chatwood and added another on a single by Anthony Rendon as the Cubs lost again 7–5. The loss moved the Cubs 2.5 games behind the Cardinals for the division lead. Anthony Rizzo missed the game with continued back issues.
- **August 27** – After an off day, the Cubs traveled to New York to face the Mets. Yu Darvish pitched eight innings and allowed only one run. He issued his first walk since July 23 in the game, but shut down the Mets. The Cub offense, led by two-run homers by Javier Báez and Addison Russell, scored enough for the 5–2 win. The Cubs remained 2.5 games behind the Cardinals in the division. Anthony Rizzo missed his second straight game with a bad back.
- **August 28** – The Cub offense continued to pound the ball as they scored 10 runs in the first three innings off Mets' starter Noah Syndergaard. Kyle Hendricks struggled as well, allowing six runs in 4.2 innings, but the Cub bullpen held on for a 10–7 win. Ian Happ, Kyle Schwarber, and Nicholas Castellanos homered for the Cubs in the win. Anthony Rizzo again missed the game due to a bad back. The win pulled the Cubs within two games of the Cardinals for the division lead.
- **August 29** – Jon Lester allowed five hits and walked three, but only allowed one run in six innings of work against the Mets. Victor Caratini hit two home runs, including a three-run tiebreaking homer in the seventh to give the Cubs a 1 4–1 win. The Cubs narrowed their division deficit to 1.5 games with the sweep over the Mets. Anthony Rizzo missed his fourth straight game.
- **August 30** – The Cubs returned home to face the Brewers at Wrigley Field. The Cub offense continued to put up runs, scoring five in the first two innings two homers by Nicholas Castellanos and an RBI-double by starter Jose Quintana. Kyle Schwarber also homered as the Cubs beat the Brewers 7–1. The win moved the Cubs within one game of first place. Anthony Rizzo missed his fifth straight game.
- **August 31** – Cole Hamels pitched six innings and allowed two runs, but the Cubs were blanked by the Brewers' pitching and lost 2–0. The loss with a Cardinal doubleheader sweep moved the Cubs to 2.5 games out of first. Anthony Rizzo returned to the lineup for the first time since August 24.

==== September ====
- **September 1** – The Cub offense continued to struggle against the Brewers failing to score for the second straight game and losing 4–0. The loss moved the Cubs to three games out of the division lead. Javier Baez left the game due to a thumb injury
- **September 2** – The Cubs next welcomed the Seattle Mariners to Wrigley for a brief two-game series. The Cub offense continued to struggle, failing to score a run until the seventh when Anthony Rizzo drove in a run and Kyle Schwarber had a bases-clearing triple. The Cubs pulled out the 5–1 win to stay within three games of the Cardinals. Javier Baez missed his second straight game.
- **September 3** – Willson Contreras homered in his return to the lineup while Nicholas Castellanos and Kyle Schwarber also homered as the Cubs beat the Mariners 6–1. Jon Lester pitched six innings, allowing six hits, but no runs in the win. The win again only kept the Cubs within three games of the Cardinals. Javier Baez missed his third straight game. Ben Zobrist returned to the lineup for the first time since May 6.
- **September 5** – After an off day, the Cubs traveled to Milwaukee to face the Brewers in a four-game series. A five-run sixth inning, highlighted by a grand slam by Kyle Schwarber pushed the Cubs into the lead as they won 10–5. Jose Quintana only last give innings while allowing four runs, but earned the win as the Cubs moved to within 2.5 games of the Cardinals. Javier Baez missed his fourth straight game.
- **September 6** – Cole Hamels allowed five runs in 3.1 innings as the Cubs were blown out by the Brewers 7–1. The sole Cub run coming on a Nicholas Castellanos home run in the third. A Cardinals' loss kept the Cubs 2.5 games out of the division lead. Javier Baez missed his fifth straight game.
- **September 7** – A 1–1 tie in the eighth was broken on an Anthony Rizzo bases loaded walk. The Cubs could manage no further runs in the inning despite having the bases loaded with no outs. Yasmani Grandal homered on the first pitch of the bottom of the eighth off of David Phelps to tie the game at two. In the bottom of the ninth, Christian Yelich doubled home the game-winning run as the Cubs lost 3–2. The loss moved the Cubs 3.5 games behind the Cardinals for the division lead. Javier Baez missed his sixth straight game.
- **September 8** – In the final game of the series, Jon Lester surrendered eight runs in 5.1 innings and the Cubs fell behind 8–3. Two runs in the ninth on a Jason Heyward home run were not enough as the Cubs lost their third straight, 8–5. The loss moved the Cubs to 4.5 games behind the Cardinals for the division lead and only 1.5 games ahead of the Arizona Diamondbacks for the second wild card spot. Javier Baez missed his seventh straight game.
- **September 9** – Looking to stay in the division race, the Cubs traveled to San Diego to take on the Padres in a four-game series. Due to injuries to Javier Baez and Addison Russell, the Cubs called up their top prospect Nico Hoerner to play shortstop against the Padres. Hoerner went 3–4 with a triple and four RBIs in his debut. Nicholas Castellanos and Kyle Schwarber both homered as the Cubs won 10–2. Kyle Hendricks scattered seven hits and allowed two runs in 5.2 innings to earn the win. The win moved the Cubs to within four games of the Cardinals for the division lead and two games ahead of the Brewers in the hunt for the second wild card spot. It was announced prior to the game, the Javier Baez had a hairline fracture in his left thumb and would miss the remainder of the regular season.
- **September 10** – Jose Quintana gave up six runs, four earned, in three innings of work as the Cubs fell behind 7–2 in the third. Kris Bryan hit a two-run home run in the fifth to narrow the lead to 6–5. After Brandon Kintzler surrendered two runs in the seventh, Bryany hit his second homer of the day, another two-run shot to narrow the lead. Jason Heyward followed with a solo home run to tie it at eight. In extra innings, Steve Cishek allowed a single and walked three straight batters to force in the winning run as the Cubs lost 9–8. The lost left the Cubs four games behind the Cardinals for the division lead, but narrowed the wild card lead to one game.
- **September 10** – The Cub offense was shut down by the Padres as the Cubs lost 4–0. The loss moved the Cubs into a tie for the second wild card spot with the Brewers.
- **September 11** – Yu Darvish struck out 14 Padres in six innings of work and did not allow a run. Ian Happ drove in two runs as the Cubs salvaged a series split, winning 4–1. The win kept the Cubs four games behind the Cardinals and tied with the Brewers.
- **September 12** – Returning home to Wrigley to face the Pirates, Jon Lester gave up four runs in the first inning, but the Cubs scored five in the bottom half of the inning on home runs by Nicholas Castellanos, Willson Contreras, and Nico Hoerner in the first pitch he saw in his Wrigley debut. The Cubs pounded out five more runs in the third on a second homer by Contreras and a grand slam by Anthony Rizzo. The Cubs added seven more in the fifth as they blew out the Pirates 17–8. Nico Hoerner and Rizzo each drove in four runs in the game. The win kept the Cubs within four games of the Cardinals for the division lead, and moved them one game ahead of the Brewers.
- **September 13** – Kyle Hendricks pitched six innings and allowed only one run as the Cub offense continued to put up runs. Ben Zobrist, Kris Bryant, Nico Hoerner, and Victor Caratini all homered for the Cubs as they dismantled the Pirates 14–1. Bryant drove in four runs and Hoerner drove in three runs in the easy win. The win moved the Cubs to within three games of the Cardinals for the division lead.
- **September 14** – For third consecutive game, the Cub offense put up at least 14 runs as the Cubs swept the Pirates winning 16–6. Kris Bryant, Ian Happ, Kyle Schwarber, and Jonathan Lucroy all homered for the Cubs in the win. Jose Quintana, however, only lasted two innings and allowed five runs as he continued to struggle. The win moved the Cusb within two games of the Cardinals for the division lead. Anthony Rizzo left the game with an ankle injury.
- **September 15** – With the Reds coming to Wrigley, the Cub offense continued to score runs. Kyle Schwarber homered and drove in three while Nicholas Castellanos drove in two runs. Cole Hamels only allowed two runs, but lasted only 3.1 innings as the Cubs won 8–2 winning their fifth straight game. The win kept the Cubs within two games of the Cardinals and one game ahead of the Brewers. Prior to the game, it was announced that Anthony Rizzo would likely miss the rest of the regular season with his ankle injury.
- **September 16** – Kyle Schwarber hit a three-run homer in the first to give the Cubs the early lead. Cole Hamels gave up two runs in just 3.1 innings of work, but the Cub bullpen shut out the Reds. The Cubs added two in the sixth on an RBI-double by Jason Heyward and Ben Zobrist single. An Ian Happ single in the eighth extended the lead to 6–2 and Nicholas Castellanos drove in two on a double as the Cubs won 8–2. The win moved the Cubs half a game behind the Nationals for the wild card spot and two games behind the Cardinals for the division lead.
- **September 17** – Yu Darvish struck out eight Reds in a row at one point setting a Cub record for consecutive strikeouts, but still gave up four runs. For the first time in four games, the Cub offense was held in check, managing only two runs as the Cubs lost 4–2. The loss moved the Cubs into a tie with the Brewers two games behind the Cardinals in the division.
- **September 18** – Jon Lester pitched five plus innings and gave up on run, but the Cub offense was held in check, mustering only four hits and scoring only two runs, one on a Willson Contreras home run. The game went to extra innings before the Cubs lost 3–2 in 10. The loss dropped the Cubs three games behind the Cardinals while still tied with the Brewers for the second wild card spot. The loss was the fourth in a row for the Cubs in a crucial stretch for their playoff hopes.
- **September 19** – With the Cubs' playoff hopes dwindling, the Cardinals visited Wrigley Field for a four-game series that would likely determine their season. Anthony Rizzo made a surprise return to the lineup and led off. Rizzo hit a solo home run in the third. Kyle Hendricks allowed four runs in 5.1 innings as the Cubs fell behind 4–1. In the bottom of the ninth, the Cubs tied it on an RBI-double by Ben Zobrist, a run-scoring single by Willson Contreras, and an RBI-groundout by Jason Heyward. However, Craig Kimbrel surrendered a home run to Matt Carpenter in the top of the 10th and the Cubs lost 5–4, moving four games behind the Cardinals in the division and a game behind the Brewers for the final wild card spot. Javier Baez pinch ran in the ninth inning, his first appearance in a game since September 1
- **September 20** – The Cubs pushed across a run in the second on a fielding error, but could not manage to score again. Alec Mills pitched well for 4.2 innings, but David Phelps promptly allowed two runs in the sixth to give the Cardinals a 2–1 win. The loss moved the Cubs five games out of the division lead and two games out of the last wild card spot.
- **September 21** – The Cubs took an early 3–1 lead in game three of the series, but Jose Quintana surrendered five runs in 3.1 innings of work, surrendering the Cub lead. Ian Happ tied it in the fifth with a two-run homer and Nico Hoerner gave the Cubs a 6–5 lead in the sixth with his third homer of the season. Kyle Ryan gave up the lead again for the Cubs, allowing a two-run homer to Marcel Ozuna in the seventh. A two-run Tony Kemp homer in the seventh gave the Cubs an 8–7 lead. But Craig Kimbrel gave up back-to-back home runs on back-to-back pitches in the ninth and the Cubs fell 9–8. Javier Baez pinch hit in the bottom of the 10th with two outs, but struck out to end the game. The at-bat marked his last on the season. The Cubs fell to six games behind the Cardinals in the division and three games out of the wild card.
- **September 22** – In the final game of the four-game series, the Cubs were swept by the Cardinals. Yu Darvish pitched well, but surrendered two runs in the top of the ninth and the Cubs lost 3–2, losing their sixth game in a row. The loss eliminated the Cubs from the division and moved them four games out of the wild card with only six games remaining.
- **September 24** – The Cubs next traveled to Pittsburgh where they were blown out 9–2. Kyle Hendricks gave up six runs in six innings to move the Cubs to the brink of elimination.
- **September 25** – Jon Lester allowed only two runs on eight hits in six innings, but left the game trailing the Pirates 2–1. After the Cubs tied it in the seventh on an Ian Happ home run, the bullpen gave up two runs in the bottom of the eighth as the Cubs lost 4–2. The loss marked the Cubs eighth straight loss as the Cubs were officially eliminated from playoff contention.
- **September 26** – Jose Quintana gave up seven runs and 12 hits to the Pirates in five innings of work as the Cubs lost again, 9–5. The loss was the Cubs ninth straight.
- **September 27** – Traveling to St. Louis for the last series of the season with nothing to play for, the Cubs blew out the Cardinals 8–2. Ian Happ and Robel Garcia homered for the Cubs while Alec Mills pitched well, allowing only one run in five innings of work. The loss ended the Cubs nine-game losing streak.
- **September 28** – Cole Hamels, making his last start as a Cub, pitched four innings without allowing a run. Kyle Schwarber, Ian Happ, and Victor Caratini homered for the Cubs as the beat the Cardinals 8–6 and prevented the Cardinals from clinching the division.
- **September 29** – On the final day of the season, the Cubs announced before the game that Joe Maddon would not return as manager for the Cubs. In his final game with the Cubs, the Cubs again looked to prevent the Cardinals from winning the division, but Derek Holland, making a spot start, gave up seven runs in two innings of work and the Cubs were shut out 9–0.

=== Transactions ===
==== March ====
March 22	Optioned Ian Happ to Iowa.
March 29	Assigned LHP Brian Duensing outright to Iowa.

==== April ====
April 3	Agreed to terms with INF David Bote on a five-year contract extension.
April 6	Designated RHP Jen-Ho Tseng for assignment. Placed LHP Mike Montgomery on the 10-day IL, retroactive to April 5. Optioned RHP Carl Edwards Jr. to Iowa. Recalled LHP Kyle Ryan from Iowa. Selected the contract of RHP Allen Webster from Iowa.
April 10	Placed LHP Jon Lester on 10-day IL (hamstring) retroactive to April 9. Recalled LHP Tim Collins from Iowa.
April 21	Optioned LHP Randy Rosario to Iowa, recalled RHP Alec Mills from Iowa.
April 23	INF David Bote placed on paternity list. Recalled LHP Randy Rosario.
April 24	Activated INF David Bote from paternity list. Optioned RHP Alec Mills to Iowa.
April 25	Activated LHP Jon Lester from 10-day IL. Optioned LHP Tim Collins to Iowa.
April 26	Recalled RHP Dillon Maples from Iowa. Optioned LHP Randy Rosario to Iowa.

==== May ====
May 2	Activated INF Addison Russell from suspended list, optioned to Iowa.
May 7	Recalled RHP Carl Edwards Jr. Optioned RHP Dillon Maples to Iowa.
May 8	Placed RHP Pedro Strop (hamstring) on 10-day IL. Activated LHP Mike Montomery from 10-day IL. Placed INF/OF Ben Zobrist (personal reasons) on restricted list. Recalled INF Addison Russell from Iowa.
May 11	Activated LHP Xavier Cedeño from IL. Placed RHP Allen Webster (arm) on 10-day IL.
May 16	Activated C Victor Caratini from IL. Optioned C Taylor Davis to Iowa.
May 18	Claimed RHP Chandler Shepherd off waivers from Boston Red Sox.
May 22	Placed LHP Xavier Cedeño (wrist inflammation) on 10-day IL. Recalled RHP Rowan Wick from Iowa. RHP Chandler Shepherd claimed off waivers by Baltimore Orioles.
May 24	Recalled RHP James Norwood from Iowa. Optioned RHP Rowan Wick to Iowa.
May 25	Recalled RHP Dillon Maples and LHP Tim Collins from Iowa. Optioned OF Mark Zagunis and RHP James Norwood to Iowa.
May 27	Selected the contract of INF/OF Jim Adduci from Iowa. Optioned RHP Tim Collins to Iowa.
May 28	Signed free agent C Edgar Gamargo to a minor league contract.

==== June ====
June 1	Signed free agent OF Carlos González to a minor league contract.
June 3	Selected the contract of OF Carlos González. Designated Jim Adduci for assignment.
June 4	Activated RHP Pedro Strop from IL. Optioned RHP Dillon Maples to Iowa.
June 5	Signed free agent RHP Craig Kimbrel to a 3-year $43 million deal. Sent OF Jim Adduci outright to Iowa.
June 7	Transferred RHP Allen Webster from the 10-day injured list to the 60-day injured list. Optioned RHP Craig Kimbrel to Iowa.
June 11	Signed first-round draft pick RHP Ryan Jensen. Signed international free agent LHP Salvador Andricson to a minor league contract.
June 13	Placed RHP Carl Edwards Jr. (thoracic strain) on 10-day IL. LHP Tim Collins recalled from Iowa.
June 15	Placed RHP Kyle Hendricks (shoulder inflammation) on 10-day IL. Recalled RHP Rowan Wick from Iowa.
June 19	Signed OF Darius Hill, IF Grayson Byrd, OF Zac Taylor, 3B Ryan Reynolds, OF Nelson Maldonado, LHP Adam Laskey, RHP Alex Moore, RHP Tanner Dalton, 2B Chase Strumpf, RHP Chris Clarke, RHP Josh Burgmann, RHP Hunter Bigge, LHP Davidjohn Herz, RHP Brad Deppermann, 2B Bryce Windham, LHP Bryan Kin, OF Manny Collier, RHP Chris Kachmar, RHP Cayne Ueckert, and IF Jacob Olson.
June 20	Recalled RHP Adbert Alzolay from Iowa. Designated LHP Tim Collins for reassignment.
June 22	Sent LHP Tim Collins outright to Iowa.
June 23	Activated RHP Tony Barnette from 60-day IL. Optioned RHP Rowan Wick to Iowa.
June 27	Signed C Jake Washer. Recalled RHP Craig Kimbrel from Iowa.
June 29	Placed LHP Cole Hamels (Left oblique strain) on the 10-day IL. Designated RF Carlos Gonzalez for assignment. Recalled RHP Dillon Maples and Rown Wick from Iowa.

==== July ====
July 1	Sent RF Carlos Gonzalez outright to Iowa.
July 2	Activated RHP Kyle Hendricks from the 10-day IL. Optioned RHP Adbert Alzolay and RHP Rowan Wick to Iowa. Recalled LHP Randy Rosario from Iowa. Signed free agent SS Kevin Made, C Brayan Altuve, and C Ronnier Quintero to a minor league contract.
July 3	Optioned RHP Dillon Maples to Iowa. Selected the contract of 2B Robel García from Iowa.
July 5	Signed RHP Zach Bryant.
July 6	Signed free agent RHP Rodrigo Garcia to a minor league contract.
July 11	Signed C Ethan Hearn.
July 12	Signed free agent RHP Joe Nahas to a minor league contract.
July 15	Traded LHP Mike Montgomery to the Kansas City Royals for C Martín Maldonado.
July 16	Placed C Willson Contreras on 10-day IL retroactive to July 14. Recalled RHP Alec Mills from Iowa.
July 19	Activated RHP Carl Edwards Jr. from 10-day IL. Optioned LHP Randy Rosario to Iowa.
July 22	Optioned RHP Carl Edwards Jr to Iowa. Recalled RHP Rowan Wick from Iowa.
July 23	Optioned RHP Alec Mills to Iowa. Recalled LHP Tim Collins from Iowa.
July 24	Activated C Willson Contreras from 10-day IL. Optioned INF Addison Russell to Iowa.
July 26	Traded cash considerations to San Francisco Giants for LHP Derek Holland. Designated Tim Collins for assignment. Recalled Ian Happ from Iowa.
July 27	Placed 2B Daniel Descalso on 10-day IL retroactive to July 24. Activated LHP Derek Holland. Sent LHP Tim Collins outright to Iowa.
July 30	Placed RHP Pedro Strop on 10-day IL retroactive to July 27. Transferred LHP Xavier Cedeno to the 60-day IL. Recalled RHP Duane Underwood Jr. from Iowa. Traded RHP Thomas Hatch to the Toronto Blue Jays for RHP David Phelps.
July 31	Traded C Martín Maldonado to the Houston Astros for INF Tony Kemp. Traded RHP Alex Lange and RHP Paul Richan to the Detroit Tigers for RF Nicholas Castellanos. Traded RHP Carl Edwards Jr. to San Diego Padres for LHP Brad Wieck. Optioned Duane Underwood Jr. to Iowa. Designated RHP Oscar De La Cruz for assignment.

==== August ====
August 1	Optioned INF Robel García to Iowa and activated Nicholas Castellanos. LHP Tim Collins refused assignment to Iowa and elected free agency. Signed free agent OF Luis Berelleza to a minor league contract.
August 2	Assigned Brad Wieck to Iowa.
August 3	Activated LHP Cole Hamels from 10-day IL. Designated RHP Brad Brach for assignment. Sent RHP Oscar De La Cruz outright to Tennessee.
August 4	Placed C Willson Contreras (hamstring) on the 10-day IL. Recalled C Taylor Davis from Iowa.
August 5	Placed RHP Craig Kimbrel (knee inflammation) on 10-day IL. Recalled RHP Duane Underwood Jr from Iowa. Released RHP Brad Brach.
August 6	Placed RHP Brandon Kintzler on 10-day IL. Activated RHP Pedro Strop from 10-day IL. Signed free agent RHP Tyler Schlaffer. Signed free agent RHP Chih-Wei Hu to a minor league contract.
August 7	Signed free agent RHP Alex Wilson to a minor league contract.
August 8	Optioned C Taylor Davis to Iowa. Signed free agent C Jonathan Lucroy.
August 9	Placed LHP Kyle Ryan on bereavement list. Recalled RHP Alec Mills from Iowa.
August 10	Placed RHP Steve Cishek (hip inflammation) on the 10-day IL. Recalled RHP Dillon Maples from Iowa.
August 13	Activated LHP Kyle Ryan from bereavement. Optioned RHP Dillon Maples to Iowa.
August 15	Recalled RHP James Norwood from Iowa. Optioned RHP Alex Mills to Iowa.
August 16	Activated RHP Brandon Kintzler from the 10-day IL. Recalled INF Addison Russell from Iowa. Optioned OF Albert Almora Jr. and RHP James Norwood to Iowa.
August 18	Activated RHP Craig Kimbrel from the 10-day IL. Optioned RHP Duane Underwood Jr. to Iowa. Recalled OF Mark Zagunis as 26th player on roster for Little League Classic. Optioned OF Mark Zagunis to Iowa.
August 19	Optioned IF David Bote to Iowa.
August 20	Activated RHP Steve Cishek from the 10-day IL.
August 25	Placed LHP Derek Holland on the 10-day IL (left wrist contusion) retroactive to August 24. Recalled IF David Bote from Iowa.
August 27	Placed LHP Cole Hamels on the paternity list. Recalled RHP James Norwood from Iowa.
August 30	Activated LHP Cole Hamels from the paternity list. Optioned RHP James Norword to Iowa.

==== September ====
September 1	Activated OF Ben Zobrist from the restricted list. Activated IF Daniel Descalso from the 10-day IL. Designated OF Mark Zagunis for assignment. Optioned David Bote to Iowa. Recalled OF Albert Almora Jr., C Taylor Davis, IF Robel García, RHP Alec Mills, RHP Duane Underwood Jr., and LHP Brad Wieck from Iowa.
September 2	Recalled RHP Adbert Alzolay from Iowa.
September 3	Activated C Willson Contreras and LHP Derek Holland from the 10-day IL.
September 4	Optioned C Taylor Davis to Iowa.
September 5	Recalled IF David Bote from Iowa. Placed RHP Craig Kimbrel (right elbow inflammation) on the 10-day IL.
September 7	Designated C Taylor Davis for assignment. Selected the contract LHP Danny Hultzen from Iowa. Sent OF Mark Zagunis outright to Iowa.
September 9	Designated LHP Randy Rosario for assignment. Optioned RHP Adbert Alzolay to South Bend Cubs. Recalled RHP James Norwood from Iowa. Selected the contract of SS Nico Hoerner from Tennessee Smokies.
September 10	Sent C Taylor Davis outright to Iowa.
September 12	LHP Randy Rosario claimed off waivers by Kansas City Royals.
September 13	Recalled RHP Dillon Maples from Iowa.
September 15	Placed INF Addison Russell on 7-day IL (concussion) retroactive to September 12.
September 19	Activated INF Addison Russell from the 7-day IL and RHP Craig Kimbrel from the 10-day IL.
September 20	Signed RHP Jose Alcila and SS Luis Maza to minor league contracts.
September 26	Signed RHP Albaro Santana to a minor league contract.
September 30	Recalled RHP Adbert Alzolay from Iowa. Recalled LHP Justin Stelle from Tennessee.

== Roster ==
(Contains all players who played in a game for the Cubs during the 2019 season.)

2019 Chicago Cubs
Roster
Pitchers: 73 Adbert Alzolay; 43 Tony Barnette; 29 Brad Brach; 45 Xavier Cedeno; 21 Tyler Chatwood; 41 Steve Cishek; 37 Tim Collins; 11 Yu Darvish; 6 Carl Edwards Jr.; 35 Cole Hamels; 28 Kyle Hendricks; 45 Derek Holland; 39 Danny Hultzen; 24 Craig Kimbrel; 20 Brandon Kintzler; 34 Jon Lester; 36 Dillon Maples; 30 Alec Mills; 38 Mike Montgomery; 57 James Norwood; 37 David Phelps; 62 José Quintana; 47 Randy Rosario; 56 Kyle Ryan; 46 Pedro Strop; 51 Duane Underwood Jr.; 61 Allen Webster; 50 Rowan Wick; 38 Brad Wieck	Catchers: 7 Víctor Caratini; 40 Willson Contreras; 53 Taylor Davis; 25 Jonathan Lucroy; 38 Martin Maldonado; Infielders: 9 Javier Báez; 13 David Bote; 17 Kris Bryant; 3 Daniel Descalso; 16 Robel Garcia; 2 Nico Hoerner; 44 Anthony Rizzo; 27 Addison Russell; 18 Ben Zobrist	Outfielders: 33 Jim Adduci; 5 Albert Almora; 6 Nicholas Castellanos; 2 Carlos Gonzalez; 8 Ian Happ; 22 Jason Heyward; 4 Tony Kemp; 12 Kyle Schwarber; 2 Mark Zagunis	Manager: 70 Joe Maddon; Coaches: 58 Mike Borzello (catching/associate pitching); 55 Brian Butterfield (third base); 63 Juan Cabreja (staff assistant); 76 Chris Denorfia (quality assurance); 65 Franklin Font (staff assistant); 68 Tommy Hottovy (pitching); 4, 21 Anthony Iapoce (hitting); 19 Mark Loretta (bench); 95 Chad Noble (bullpen catcher); 1 Terrmel Sledge (assistant hitting; 00 Lester Strode (bullpen); 25, 99 Will Venable (first base)

== Achievements and records ==
- On May 6, Anthony Rizzo hit his 200th career home run, his 199th with the Cubs.
- On June 23, Javier Báez hit his 110th career home run.
- On August 16, Kyle Schwarber hit his 100th career home run in his 453rd career game, the fastest Cub to 100 home runs ever.

== Statistics ==
=== Batting ===
(Final season statistics)

Note: G = Games played; AB = At bats; R = Runs; H = Hits; 2B = Doubles; 3B = Triples; HR = Home runs; RBI = Runs batted in; SB = Stolen bases; BB = Walks; K = Strikeouts; AVG = Batting average; OBP = On-base percentage; SLG = Slugging percentage; TB = Total bases

Player	G	AB	R	H	2B	3B	HR	RBI	SB	BB	K	AVG	OBP	SLG	TB
Jim Adduci	2	5	0	0	0	0	0	0	0	0	3	.000	.000	.000	0
Albert Almora Jr.	130	339	41	80	11	1	12	32	2	16	62	.236	.271	.381	129
Adbert Alzolay	4	5	0	0	0	0	0	0	0	0	2	.000	.000	.000	0
Javier Báez	138	531	89	149	38	4	29	85	11	28	156	.281	.316	.531	282
David Bote	127	303	47	78	17	0	11	41	5	44	93	.257	.362	.422	128
Brad Brach	39	4	0	1	0	0	0	1	0	0	1	.250	.250	.250	1
Kris Bryant	147	543	108	153	35	1	31	77	4	74	145	.282	.382	.521	283
Victor Caratini	95	244	31	65	11	0	11	34	1	29	59	.266	.348	.448	109
Nicholas Castellanos	51	212	43	68	21	0	16	36	0	10	47	.321	.356	.646	137
Tyler Chatwood	40	18	1	3	2	0	0	1	0	1	6	.167	.211	.278	5
Steve Cishek	64	2	0	0	0	0	0	0	0	0	0	.000	.000	.000	0
Willson Contreras	105	360	57	98	18	2	24	64	1	38	102	.272	.355	.533	192
Yu Darvish	30	56	1	5	0	0	0	3	0	2	31	.089	.119	.089	5
Taylor Davis	7	18	2	3	0	0	1	4	0	2	4	.167	.250	.333	6
Daniel Descalso	82	168	20	29	5	1	2	15	2	23	57	.173	.271	.250	42
Robel García	31	72	8	15	2	2	5	11	0	7	35	.208	.275	.500	36
Carlos González	15	40	8	7	2	0	1	3	0	8	19	.175	.306	.300	12
Cole Hamels	24	42	1	6	1	0	0	4	0	1	15	.143	.178	.167	7
Ian Happ	58	140	25	37	7	1	11	30	2	15	39	.264	.333	.564	79
Kyle Hendricks	29	54	1	8	1	0	0	5	0	2	29	.148	.193	.167	9
Jason Heyward	147	513	78	129	20	4	21	62	8	68	110	.251	.343	.429	12
Nico Hoerner	20	78	13	22	1	1	3	17	0	3	11	.282	.305	.436	34
Derek Holland	20	2	0	0	0	0	0	0	0	1	1	.000	.333	.000	0
Tony Kemp	44	82	8	15	3	2	1	12	0	7	18	.183	.258	.305	25
Jon Lester	28	48	6	9	2	0	1	6	0	5	20	.188	.264	.292	14
Jonathan Lucroy	27	53	2	10	2	0	1	6	0	6	12	.189	.283	.283	15
Martín Maldonado	4	11	0	0	0	0	0	0	0	2	5	.000	.154	.000	0
Alec Mills	9	12	0	1	0	0	0	0	0	0	6	.083	.083	.083	1
Mike Montgomery	18	5	0	1	0	0	0	0	0	0	2	.200	.200	.200	1
James Norwood	9	1	0	0	0	0	0	0	0	0	0	.000	.000	.000	0
José Quintana	32	54	2	5	1	0	0	3	0	0	27	.093	.093	.111	6
Anthony Rizzo	146	512	89	150	29	3	27	94	5	71	86	.293	.405	.520	266
Randy Rosario	11	1	0	0	0	0	0	0	0	0	0	.000	.000	.000	0
Addison Russell	82	215	25	51	4	1	9	23	2	20	58	.237	.308	.391	84
Kyle Ryan	71	2	0	0	0	0	0	0	0	1	1	.000	.333	.000	0
Kyle Schwarber	155	529	82	132	29	3	38	92	2	70	156	.250	.339	.531	281
Duane Underwood Jr.	12	1	0	0	0	0	0	0	0	0	1	.000	.000	.000	0
Mark Zagunis	30	36	2	9	3	0	0	5	0	4	16	.250	.325	.333	12
Ben Zobrist	47	150	24	39	5	0	1	17	0	23	24	.260	.358	.313	47
Team totals	162	5461	814	1378	270	26	256	783	45	581	1460	.252	.331	.452	2468

=== Pitching ===
(Final season statistics)

Note: W = Wins; L = Losses; ERA = Earned run average; G = Games pitched; GS = Games started; SV = Saves; IP = Innings pitched; H = Hits allowed; R = Runs allowed; ER = Earned runs allowed; BB = Walks allowed; K = Strikeouts

Player	W	L	ERA	G	GS	SV	IP	H	R	ER	BB	K
Adbert Alzolay	1	1	7.30	4	2	0	12.1	13	10	10	9	13
Tony Barnette	0	0	6.75	2	0	0	1.1	2	1	1	0	0
Brad Brach	4	3	6.13	42	0	0	39.2	42	27	27	28	45
Victor Caratini	0	0	9.00	2	0	0	2.0	2	2	2	1	0
Xavier Cedeño	0	0	0.00	5	0	0	2.0	4	0	0	3	1
Tyler Chatwood	5	3	3.76	38	5	2	76.2	65	33	32	37	74
Steve Cishek	4	6	2.95	70	0	7	64.0	48	22	21	29	57
Tim Collins	0	0	3.12	9	0	0	8.2	9	3	3	3	4
Yu Darvish	6	8	3.98	31	31	0	178.2	140	82	79	56	229
Taylor Davis	0	0	0.00	1	0	0	1.0	3	0	0	0	0
Daniel Descalso	0	0	18.00	1	0	0	1.0	2	2	2	0	0
Carl Edwards Jr.	1	1	5.87	20	0	0	15.1	8	11	10	9	17
Cole Hamels	7	7	3.81	27	27	0	141.2	141	64	60	56	143
Kyle Hendricks	11	10	3.46	30	30	0	177.0	168	78	68	32	150
Derek Holland	0	1	6.89	20	1	0	15.2	14	12	12	10	11
Danny Hultzen	0	0	0.00	6	0	0	3.1	4	0	0	2	5
Craig Kimbrel	0	4	6.53	23	0	13	20.2	21	15	15	12	30
Brandon Kintzler	3	3	2.73	61	0	0	56.0	46	18	17	13	48
Jon Lester	13	10	4.46	31	31	0	171.2	205	101	85	52	165
Dillon Maples	1	0	5.40	14	0	0	11.2	6	7	7	10	18
Alec Mills	1	0	2.75	9	4	1	36.0	31	11	11	11	42
Mike Montgomery	1	2	5.67	20	0	0	27.0	35	18	17	13	18
James Norwood	0	1	2.89	9	0	0	9.1	9	4	3	8	11
David Phelps	2	1	3.18	24	0	1	17.0	17	7	6	10	18
José Quintana	13	9	4.68	32	31	0	171.0	191	100	89	46	152
Randy Rosario	1	0	5.91	13	0	0	10.2	12	8	7	5	10
Kyle Ryan	4	2	3.12	72	0	0	60.2	54	23	21	27	57
Pedro Strop	2	5	4.97	50	0	10	41.2	33	24	23	20	49
Duane Underwood Jr.	0	0	5.40	12	0	0	11.2	13	7	7	3	13
Allen Webster	0	0	4.91	12	0	1	11.0	14	7	6	5	9
Rowan Wick	2	0	2.43	31	0	2	33.1	22	13	9	16	35
Brad Wieck	2	1	3.60	14	0	0	10.0	2	4	4	4	18
Ben Zobrist	0	0	0.00	1	0	0	1.0	0	0	0	2	1
Team totals	84	78	4.10	162	162	38	1442.0	1376	717	657	534	1444

== Farm system ==
Level	Team	League	Manager	Location	Ballpark
AAA	Iowa Cubs	Pacific Coast League	Marty Pevey	Des Moines, Iowa	Principal Park
AA	Tennessee Smokies	Southern League	Mark Johnson	Knoxville, Tennessee	Smokies Stadium
A	Myrtle Beach Pelicans	Carolina League	Buddy Bailey	Myrtle Beach, South Carolina	TicketReturn.com Field
A	South Bend Cubs	Midwest League	Jimmy Gonzalez	South Bend, Indiana	Four Winds Field at Coveleski Stadium
A-Short Season	Eugene Emeralds	Northwest League	Steve Lerud	Eugene, Oregon	PK Park
Rookie	AZL Cubs	Arizona League	Carmelo Martínez	Mesa, Arizona	Sloan Park
Rookie	DSL Cubs	Dominican Summer League	Lance Rymel	Boca Chica, Dominican Republic	Baseball City Complex

== Major League Baseball draft ==
The 2019 Major League Baseball (MLB) First-Year Player Draft began on Monday, June 3, 2019, and ended June 5. The draft will assign amateur baseball players to MLB teams.

2019 Draft Order

2019 Draft Tracker (Chicago Cubs)

2019 Chicago Cubs complete draft list

Round	Pick	Name, Age	Pos / Bats	School (State)	Date sgnd.	Refs
1	27	Ryan Jensen, 21	RHP / R	Fresno State University (CA)	June 11	
2	64	Chase Strumpf, 21	2B / R	University of California, Los Angeles (CA)	TBA	
3	103	Michael McAvene, 21	RHP / R	University of Louisville (GA)	TBA	
4	132	Chris Clarke, 20	RHP / R	University of Southern California (CA)	June 14	
5	162	Josh Burgmann, 21	RHP / R	University of Washington (WA)	TBA	
6	192	Ethan Hearn, 18	C / L	Mobile Christian School (AL)	TBA	
7	222	Brad Deppermann, 22	RHP / R	University of North Florida (FL)	TBA	
8	252	Davidjohn Herz, 18	LHP / R	Terry Sanford High School (NC)	June 14	
9	282	Tyler Schlaffer, 18	RHP / R	Homewood-Flossmoor High School (IL)	TBA	
10	312	Wyatt Hendrie, 20	C / R	Antelope Valley College (CA)	TBA	
11	342	Mack Chambers, 19	SS / S	Seminole State College (OK)	TBA	
12	372	Hunter Bigge, 20	RHP / R	Harvard University (MA)	TBA	
13	402	Porter Hodge, 18	RHP / R	Cottonwood High School (UT)	TBA	
14	432	Ryan Reynolds, 21	3B / S	University of Texas (TX)	TBA	
15	462	Zach Bryant, 21	RHP / R	Jacksonville University (FL)	TBA	
16	492	Johzan Oquendo, 19	RHP / R	Leadership Christian Academy (PR)	TBA	
17	522	Tanner Dalton, 22	RHP / R	Sacramento State University (CA)	TBA	
18	552	Alex Moore, 22	RHP / R	Lander University (SC)	TBA	
19	582	Adam Laskey, 21	LHP / R	Duke University (NC)	N/A	
20	612	Darius Hill, 21	OF / L	West Virginia University (WV)	TBA	
21	642	Nelson Maldonado, 22	OF / R	University of Florida (FL)	TBA	
22	672	Elian Almanzar, 19	RHP / L	Florence–Darlington Technical College (SC)	TBA	
23	702	Manny Collier, 18	CF / R	Westwood High School (AZ)	TBA	
24	732	Grayson Byrd, 22	If / L	Clemson University (SC)	TBA	
25	762	Zac Taylor, 23	OF / R	University of Illinois (IL)	TBA	
26	792	Jacob Olson, 22	IF / R	University of South Carolina (SC)	TBA	
27	822	Cayne Ueckert, 23	RHP / R	McNeese State University (LA)	TBA	
28	852	Chris Kachmar, 22	RHP / R	Lipscomb University (TN)	TBA	
29	882	Jake Washer, 23	C / R	East Carolina University (NC)	TBA	
30	912	Bryan King, 22	LHP / R	McNeese State University (LA)	TBA	
31	942	Shane Combs, 22	RHP / R	Notre Dame University (IN)	TBA	
32	972	Bryce Windham, 22	2B / L	Old Dominion University (VA)	TBA	
33	1,002	Ryan Ritter, 18	SS / R	Lincoln-Way East High School (IL)	TBA	
34	1,032	Nolan Letzgus, 18	RHP / R	Heritage High School (GA)	TBA	
35	1,062	Hunter Patteson, 18	LHP / L	Vero Beach High School (FL)	TBA	
36	1,092	Jayson Hoopes, 18	RHP / R	St. Augustine Preparatory School (NJ)	TBA	
37	1,112	Jaylon McLaughlin, 21	CF / S	University of Nevada (NV)	TBA	
38	1,152	Marc Davis, 19	3B / R	Florida SouthWestern State College (FL)	TBA	
39	1,182	Mason Auer, 18	CF / R	Kickapoo High School (MO)	TBA	
40	1,212	Mac Bingham, 18	CF / R	Torrey Pines High School (CA)	TBA	
