= Randy Rosario =

Dominican baseball player (born 1994)

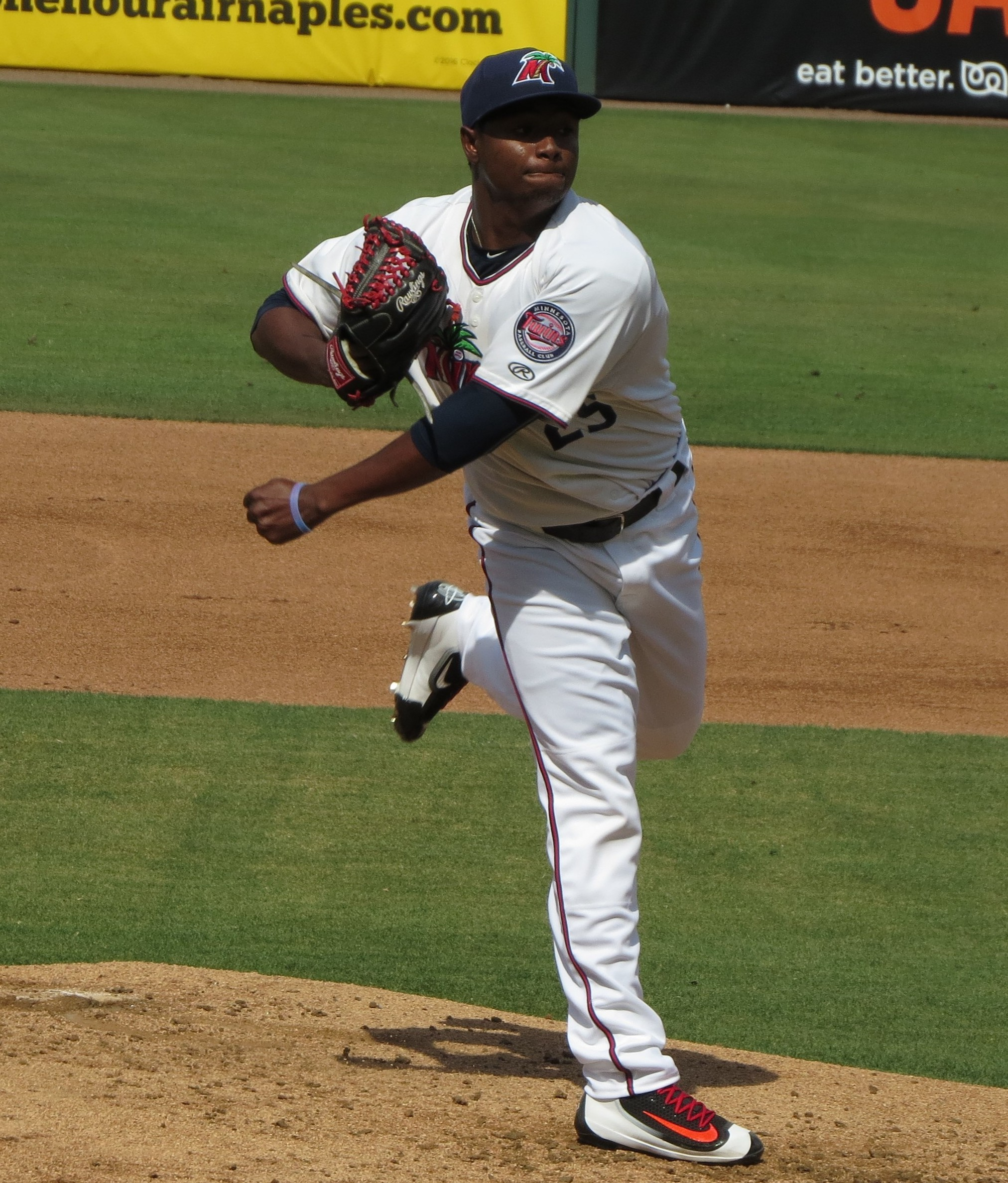
- Rosario with the Fort Myers Miracle
- Pitcher
- Born: May 18, 1994 (age 32); Nagua, Maria Trinidad Sanchez, Dominican Republic
- Batted: Left Threw: Left

Professional debut
- MLB: June 2, 2017, for the Minnesota Twins
- NPB: May 28, 2021, for the Chunichi Dragons

Last appearance
- MLB: September 1, 2020, for the Kansas City Royals
- NPB: July 2, 2021, for the Chunichi Dragons

MLB statistics
- Win–loss record: 6–1
- Earned run average: 5.00
- Strikeouts: 49

NPB statistics
- Win–loss record: 0-0
- Earned run average: 3.00
- Strikeouts: 3
- Stats at Baseball Reference

Teams
- Minnesota Twins (2017); Chicago Cubs (2018–2019); Kansas City Royals (2019–2020); Chunichi Dragons (2021)

Randy Miguel Rosario Luperon (born May 18, 1994) is a Dominican former professional baseball pitcher. He played in Major League Baseball (MLB) for the Minnesota Twins, Chicago Cubs, and Kansas City Royals, and in Nippon Professional Baseball (NPB) for the Chunichi Dragons.

== Career ==
=== Minnesota Twins ===
Rosario signed as an amateur free agent with the Minnesota Twins in 2010, receiving a $85,000 signing bonus. He made his professional debut in 2011 with the DSL Twins and spent the whole season there, going 2–4 with a 3.86 ERA in 35 innings pitched. In 2012, he played for the GCL Twins where he was 2–1 with a 1.64 ERA in ten games (seven starts), and in 2013, he pitched with the Elizabethton Twins where he pitched to a 4–3 record and 2.82 ERA in nine games.

He underwent Tommy John surgery in 2014 after three games for the Cedar Rapids Kernels, and he missed the remainder of the season. He spent 2015 with Cedar Rapids where he posted a 2–6 record and 2.52 ERA in 11 starts (ten games).

After the 2015 season, the Twins added Rosario to their 40-man roster. Rosario started 2016 with the Fort Myers Miracle and was promoted to the Chattanooga Lookouts. In 100.1 innings pitched between both teams, he was 6–7 with a 3.77 ERA. He started 2017 with Fort Myers and was quickly promoted to the Lookouts. The Twins promoted Rosario to the major leagues on June 1.

On June 2, 2017, Rosario made his major league debut against the Los Angeles Angels. He pitched two innings, allowing three runs, three hits, and struck out one in an 11-5 Twins victory. He was optioned back to the Rochester Red Wings in June and he spent the remainder of the season there.

=== Chicago Cubs ===
On November 3, 2017, Rosario was claimed off waivers by the Chicago Cubs. He began the season with the Iowa Cubs. In mid-May of the 2018 season, Rosario was recalled twice and sent down to the minors twice before he received a third recall to replace the injured Yu Darvish. He pitched 7 2/3 innings of relief allowing only 2 hits and had a 2–0 record. Rosario was designated for assignment on September 9, 2019.

=== Kansas City Royals ===
On September 12, 2019, Rosario was claimed off waivers by the Kansas City Royals. He threw 3 2/3 scoreless innings for the Royals before the end of the year. In 4 games for Kansas City in 2020, he logged an 8.10 ERA with 5 strikeouts over 3 1/3 innings pitched. Rosario was designated for assignment by the Royals on September 3, 2020. He became a free agent on November 2.

=== Chunichi Dragons ===
On December 2, 2020, it was reported that Rosario had reached a deal with the Chunichi Dragons in the Nippon Professional Baseball League. He made his NPB debut on May 28, 2021. He became a free agent following the season.

=== Saraperos de Saltillo ===
On May 3, 2022, Rosario signed with the Saraperos de Saltillo of the Mexican League. In six appearances, Rosario posted an 0–1 record with an 18.00 ERA. He was released by the Saraperos on May 17.
