= Mark Zagunis =

American baseball player (born 1993)

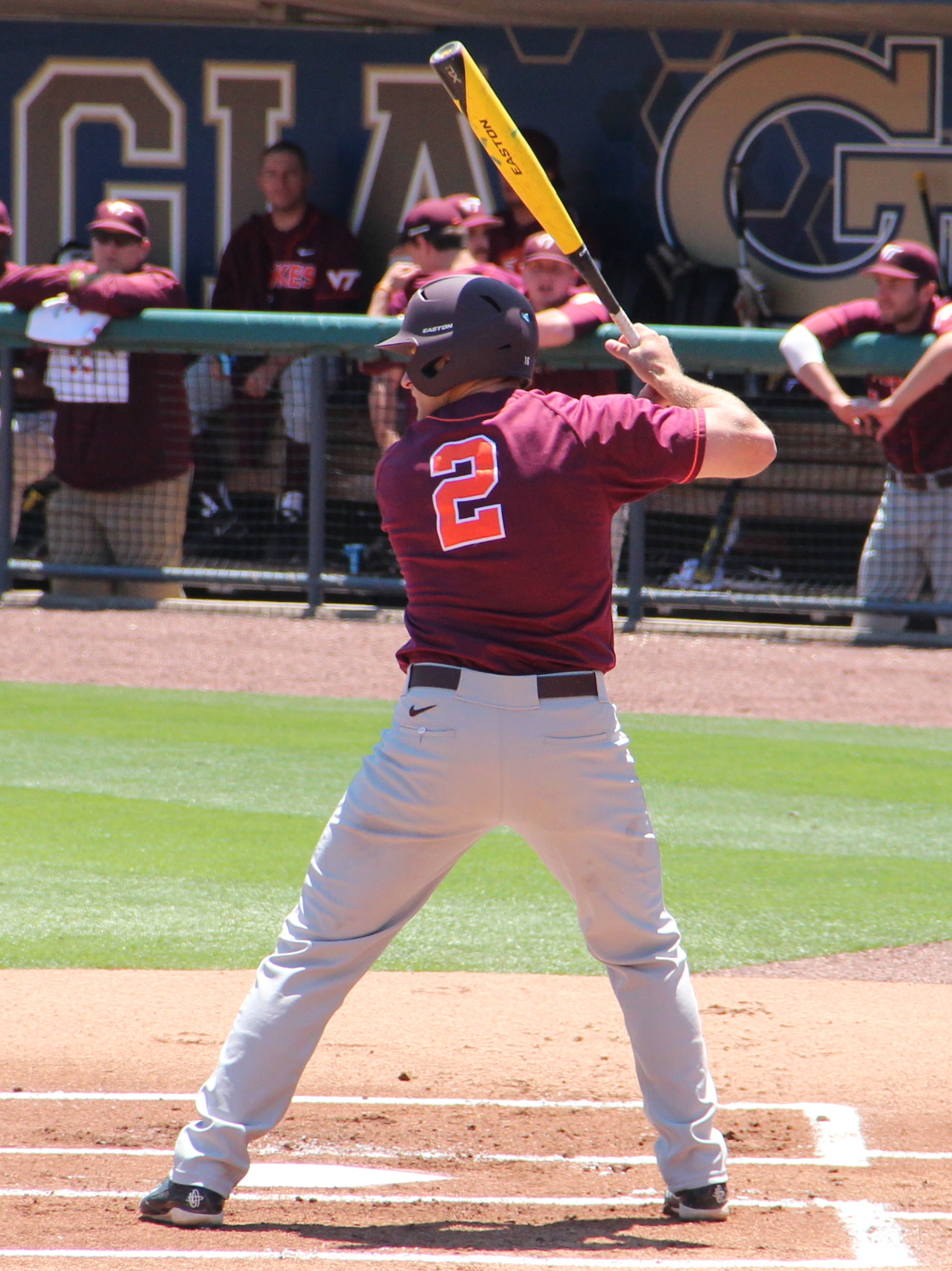
- Zagunis at Virginia Tech in 2014
- Outfielder
- Born: February 5, 1993 (age 33); Willingboro Township, New Jersey, U.S.
- Batted: Right Threw: Right

MLB debut
- June 22, 2017, for the Chicago Cubs

Last MLB appearance
- August 18, 2019, for the Chicago Cubs

MLB statistics
- Batting average: .200
- Home runs: 0
- Runs batted in: 7
- Stats at Baseball Reference

Teams
- Chicago Cubs (2017–2019)

Mark Raymond Zagunis (born February 5, 1993) is an American former professional baseball outfielder. He played in Major League Baseball (MLB) for the Chicago Cubs. Prior to his professional career, Zagunis attended Virginia Tech and played college baseball for the Virginia Tech Hokies.

== Career ==
Born in Willingboro Township, New Jersey, Zagunis grew up in Riverton, New Jersey and attended Holy Cross High School in Delran Township, New Jersey. He played for the school's baseball team as a catcher, and as the quarterback for the school's American football team. He was not selected in the Major League Baseball (MLB) draft out of high school.

Zagunis enrolled at Virginia Tech to play college baseball for the Virginia Tech Hokies baseball team. As a freshman, Zagunis was named to the All-Atlantic Coast Conference's (ACC) Second Team, and a Freshman All-American. After the 2013 season, he played collegiate summer baseball with the Harwich Mariners of the Cape Cod Baseball League. In his junior year, he batted .330 with two home runs and 39 RBI in 53 games. He was named to the All-ACC's Second Team and was a semifinalist for the Johnny Bench Award, given to the best catcher in college baseball.

=== Chicago Cubs ===
The Chicago Cubs selected Zagunis in the third round of the 2014 MLB draft. He signed with the Cubs, receiving a $615,000 signing bonus. Zagunis began his professional career with the Arizona Cubs of the Rookie-level Arizona League, before he was promoted to the Boise Hawks of the Rookie-level Pioneer League. With the Hawks, the Cubs deployed Zagunis as a left fielder in addition to catcher. He hit for the cycle for Boise on July 14. The Cubs promoted him to the Kane County Cougars of the Single-A Midwest League to finish the season. In 2015, the Cubs assigned Zagunis to the Myrtle Beach Pelicans of the High-A Carolina League. The Cubs had Zagunis focus exclusively on playing in the outfield, and Zagunis was named a Carolina League All-Star at midseason.

Zagunis began the 2016 season with the Tennessee Smokies of the Double-A Southern League, and earned a promotion to the Iowa Cubs of the Triple-A Pacific Coast League in June. He finished the 2016 season batting .288 with 10 home runs and 49 RBI's. Zagunis began the 2017 season with the Iowa Cubs, and was called up to the major leagues on June 22, 2017, following an injury to outfielder Jason Heyward. He made his MLB debut that day, going 0-for-5 with an RBI and a stolen base against the Miami Marlins. He finished his debut year with no hits in 18 plate appearances across 7 games. In 97 games for Iowa, he hit .267/.404/.455 with 13 home runs and 55 RBI. Zagunis spent the majority of the 2018 season in Iowa, hitting .272/.395/.375 in 115 games, also going 2-for-5 in 5 big league games for Chicago. In 2019, Zagunis appeared in 30 games for the Cubs, hitting .250/.325/.333 with no home runs and 5 RBI. On August 20, 2019, he was optioned down to the Triple-A Iowa Cubs. On August 31, Zagunis was designated for assignment. He finished the year in Iowa, slashing .294/.361/.475 with 6 home runs and 43 RBI in 68 games.

Zagunis opted out of the shortened 2020 season due to concerns regarding the COVID-19 pandemic. On October 22, 2020, Zagunis was outrighted off of the 40-man roster. He became a free agent on November 2.

=== Lancaster Barnstormers ===
On March 8, 2022, Zagunis signed with the Lancaster Barnstormers of the Atlantic League of Professional Baseball. He appeared in 20 games for Lancaster, batting .203/.351/.271 with 1 home run and 5 RBI. With Lancaster, Zagunis won the Atlantic League championship. He became a free agent following the season.

== Personal life ==
Zagunis's father, Mark, played college baseball for the Rutgers Scarlet Knights baseball team.
