= James Norwood (baseball) =

American baseball player (born 1993)

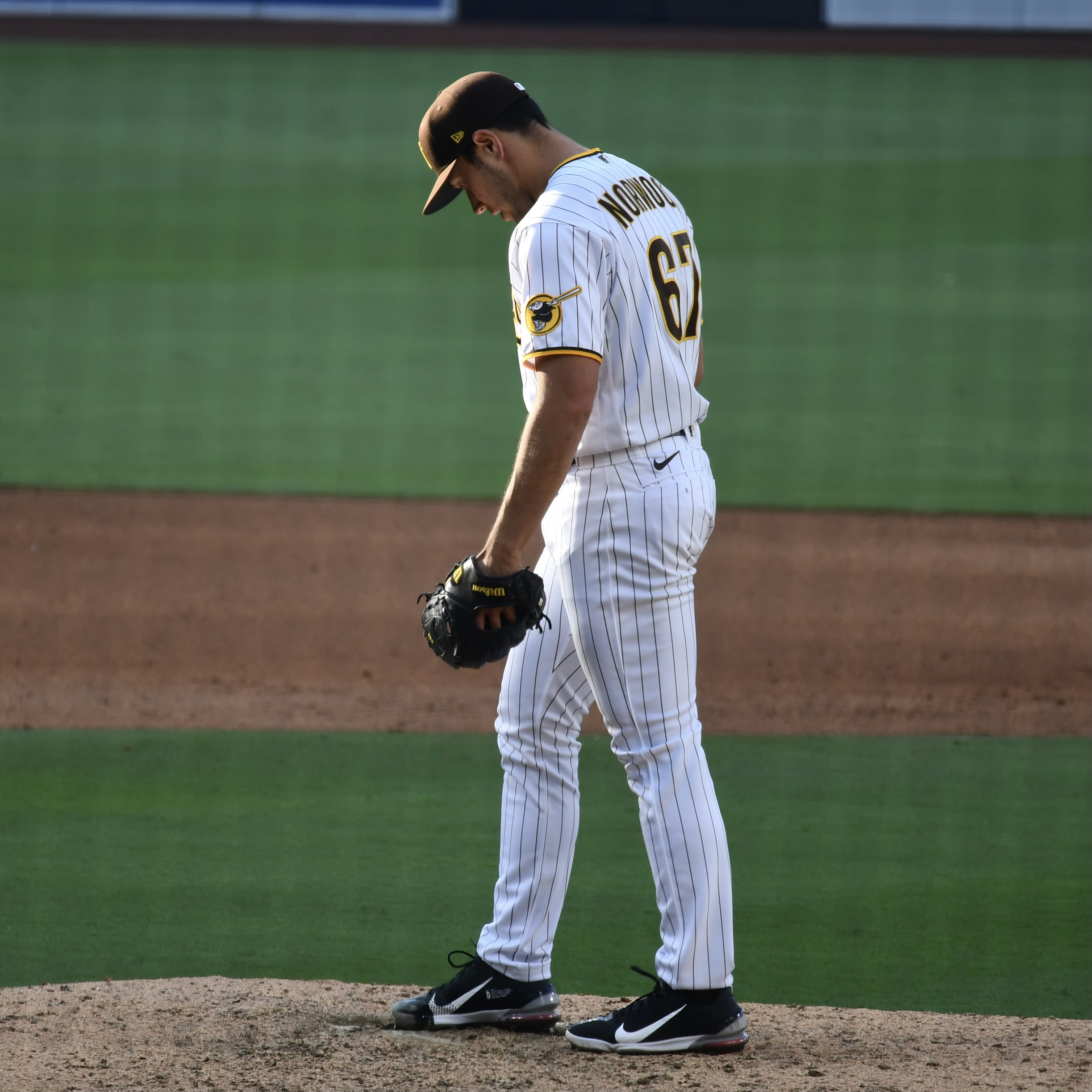
- Norwood with the San Diego Padres in 2021
- Pitcher
- Born: December 24, 1993 (age 32); New York City, New York, U.S.
- Batted: Right Threw: Right

MLB debut
- July 11, 2018, for the Chicago Cubs

Last MLB appearance
- June 12, 2022, for the Philadelphia Phillies

MLB statistics
- Win–loss record: 1–2
- Earned run average: 5.48
- Strikeouts: 46
- Stats at Baseball Reference

Teams
- Chicago Cubs (2018–2020); San Diego Padres (2021); Philadelphia Phillies (2022)

James Krittipum Norwood (born December 24, 1993) is an American former professional baseball pitcher. He played in Major League Baseball (MLB) for the Chicago Cubs, San Diego Padres, and Philadelphia Phillies. Listed at 6 feet 2 inches (1.88 m) and 215 pounds (98 kg), he throws and bats right-handed.

== Amateur career ==
Norwood grew up on the Upper East Side of Manhattan, a borough of New York City. He attended All Hallows High School in the South Bronx. In 2011, the New York Post chose Norwood as their All-Bronx Baseball Player of the Year. He enrolled at Saint Louis University and played college baseball for the Saint Louis Billikens. In 2014, he pitched to an 8–2 win–loss record and a 2.68 earned run average (ERA).

== Professional career ==
=== Chicago Cubs ===
The Chicago Cubs selected Norwood in the seventh round of the 2014 MLB draft. He signed with the Cubs and spent his first professional season with both the Arizona League Cubs and Boise Hawks, going a combined 0–2 with a 7.65 ERA in 20 innings pitched. In 2015, he played in the Arizona League and with the Class A South Bend Cubs, pitching to a combined 2–6 record and 4.68 ERA in 17 total games (11 starts), and in 2016 he pitched with both South Bend and the Class A-Advanced Myrtle Beach Pelicans, compiling a combined 4–1 record and 3.25 ERA in 30 total relief appearances. He spent 2017 with both Myrtle Beach and the Double-A Tennessee Smokies, pitching to a combined 4–3 record and 3.28 ERA in 57 2/3 innings pitched in relief. He began 2018 with Tennessee and was promoted to the Triple-A Iowa Cubs in June.

The Cubs promoted Norwood to the major leagues on July 8, 2018, and he made his major league debut on July 11, giving up one run on three hits and one walk while striking out two in 1 2/3 innings, receiving the loss. Norwood made 11 relief appearances with the 2018 Cubs, posting an 0–1 record with 4.09 ERA while striking out 10 batters in 11 innings.

Norwood made 45 relief appearances in Triple-A during 2019, recording a 4.21 ERA. He also made a total of 12 relief appearances with Chicago during 2019 and the shortened 2020 season, allowing seven runs (six earned) in 11 innings (4.91 ERA) while striking out 11 batters and issuing 9 walks. On March 31, 2021, Norwood was designated for assignment following the signing of Tony Wolters.

=== San Diego Padres ===
On April 5, 2021, the Cubs traded Norwood to the San Diego Padres in exchange for Dauris Valdez. The Padres promoted him to the major leagues on June 16. In five relief appearances with the Padres, Norwood allowed no runs in five innings of work. He also made 43 relief appearances in Triple-A with the El Paso Chihuahuas.

On March 26, 2022, Norwood was designated for assignment by San Diego to clear space on the roster for Kyle Tyler.

=== Philadelphia Phillies ===
On March 30, 2022, Norwood was traded to the Philadelphia Phillies in exchange for minor-league infielder Kervin Pichardo and cash considerations. In 20 relief appearances with the Phillies, Norwood compiled a 1–0 record with an 8.31 ERA while striking out 22 batters in 17 1/3 innings. On June 13, the Phillies designated Norwood for assignment.

=== Boston Red Sox ===
On June 18, 2022, Norwood was traded to the Boston Red Sox for cash considerations. Boston added him to the active roster for their June 19 game, but he did not make an appearance. On June 20, the Red Sox designated Norwood for assignment, as the MLB limit of 13 pitchers on an active roster took effect. He later cleared waivers and was sent outright to the Triple-A Worcester Red Sox. Norwood elected free agency after the year on November 10.

=== New York Yankees ===
On December 13, 2022, Norwood signed a minor league contract with the New York Yankees. He made 22 appearances for the Triple–A Scranton/Wilkes-Barre RailRiders, struggling to a 6.56 ERA with 36 strikeouts across 23 1/3 innings pitched. Norwood elected free agency following the season on November 6, 2023.

=== Seattle Mariners ===
On February 17, 2024, Norwood signed a minor league contract with the Seattle Mariners organization.
