= 2018 Pittsburgh Pirates season =

Major League Baseball season

2018 Pittsburgh Pirates
- League: National League
- Division: Central
- Ballpark: PNC Park
- City: Pittsburgh, Pennsylvania
- Record: 82–79 (.509)
- Divisional place: 4th
- Owners: Bob Nutting
- General managers: Neal Huntington
- Managers: Clint Hurdle
- Television: AT&T SportsNet Pittsburgh
- Radio: KDKA-FM; Pittsburgh Pirates Radio Network (Steve Blass, Joe Block, Greg Brown, Bob Walk, John Wehner)
- Stats: ESPN.com; Baseball Reference

The 2018 Pittsburgh Pirates season was the franchise's 137th season overall, 132nd season as a member of the National League, and the 18th season at PNC Park. The Pirates finished the season in fourth place in the National League Central, with a record of 82–79 and failed to qualify for the playoffs for the third consecutive season. The Pirates would not finish with another winning record until 2026.

== Offseason ==
January 4	Claimed RHP Shane Carle off waivers from Colorado Rockies and designated RHP Johnny Barbato for assignment.
January 11	Detroit Tigers claimed RHP Johnny Barbato off waivers from the Pirates.
January 13	Traded RHP Gerrit Cole to Houston Astros for 3B Colin Moran, LF Jason Martin, RHP Joe Musgrove and RHP Michael Feliz.
January 14	Designated RHP Shane Carle and SS Engelb Vielma for assignment.
January 16	Traded OF Andrew McCutchen and cash to San Francisco Giants for RHP Kyle Crick, OF Bryan Reynolds, and $500,000 in international signing bonus allocation.
January 17	Traded RHP Shane Carle to Atlanta Braves.
January 31	Traded cash and LHP Daniel Zamora to New York Mets for LHP Josh Smoker.
February 20	Traded cash to Boston Red Sox for OF Bryce Brentz.
February 22	Traded RHP Daniel Hudson, 2B Tristan Gray, and cash to Tampa Bay Rays for OF Corey Dickerson.

== Season standings ==
=== National League Central ===
NL Central
Team	W	L	Pct.	GB	Home	Road
Milwaukee Brewers	96	67	.589	—	51‍–‍30	45‍–‍37
Chicago Cubs	95	68	.583	1	51‍–‍31	44‍–‍37
St. Louis Cardinals	88	74	.543	7½	43‍–‍38	45‍–‍36
Pittsburgh Pirates	82	79	.509	13	44‍–‍36	38‍–‍43
Cincinnati Reds	67	95	.414	28½	37‍–‍44	30‍–‍51

=== National League playoff standings ===
Division leaders
Team	W	L	Pct.
Milwaukee Brewers	96	67	.589
Los Angeles Dodgers	92	71	.564
Atlanta Braves	90	72	.556

Wild Card teams (Top 2 teams qualify for postseason)
Team	W	L	Pct.	GB
Chicago Cubs	95	68	.583	+4
Colorado Rockies	91	72	.558	—
St. Louis Cardinals	88	74	.543	2½
Pittsburgh Pirates	82	79	.509	8
Arizona Diamondbacks	82	80	.506	8½
Washington Nationals	82	80	.506	8½
Philadelphia Phillies	80	82	.494	10½
New York Mets	77	85	.475	13½
San Francisco Giants	73	89	.451	17½
Cincinnati Reds	67	95	.414	23½
San Diego Padres	66	96	.407	24½
Miami Marlins	63	98	.391	27

=== Record vs. opponents ===
2018 National League record Source: MLB Standings Grid – 2018
Team	AZ	ATL	CHC	CIN	COL	LAD	MIA	MIL	NYM	PHI	PIT	SD	SF	STL	WSH	AL
Arizona	—	3–4	3–4	3–3	8–11	11–8	6–1	1–5	2–5	4–2	6–1	12–7	8–11	3–3	2–5	10–10
Atlanta	4–3	—	3–3	3–4	2–5	2–5	14–5	3–4	13–6	12–7	5–1	4–3	3–3	4–2	10–9	8–12
Chicago	4–3	3–3	—	11–8	3–3	4–3	5–2	11–9	6–1	4–2	10–9	5–2	3–3	9–10	4–3	13–7
Cincinnati	3–3	4–3	8–11	—	2–4	6–1	2–5	6–13	3–3	3–4	5–14	3–4	4–2	7–12	1–6	10–10
Colorado	11–8	5–2	3–3	4–2	—	7–13	2–4	2–5	6–1	5–2	3–3	11–8	12–7	2–5	5–2	13–7
Los Angeles	8–11	5–2	3–4	1–6	13–7	—	2–4	4–3	4–2	3–4	5–1	14–5	10–9	3–4	5–1	12–8
Miami	1–6	5–14	2–5	5–2	4–2	4–2	—	2–5	7–12	8–11	1–4	2–5	4–3	3–3	6–13	9–11
Milwaukee	5–1	4–3	9–11	13–6	5–2	3–4	5–2	—	4–3	3–3	7–12	4–2	6–1	11–8	4–2	13–7
New York	5–2	6–13	1–6	3–3	1–6	2–4	12–7	3–4	—	11–8	3–4	4–2	4–3	3–3	11–8	8–12
Philadelphia	2–4	7–12	2–4	4–3	2–5	4–3	11–8	3–3	8–11	—	6–1	3–3	4–3	4–3	8–11	12–8
Pittsburgh	1–6	1–5	9–10	14–5	3–3	1–5	4–1	12–7	4–3	1–6	—	3–4	4–3	8–11	2–5	15–5
San Diego	7–12	3–4	2–5	4–3	8–11	5–14	5–2	2–4	2–4	3–3	4–3	—	8–11	4–3	2–4	7–13
San Francisco	11–8	3–3	3–3	2–4	7–12	9–10	3–4	1–6	3–4	3–4	3–4	11–8	—	2–5	4–2	8–12
St. Louis	3–3	2–4	10–9	12–7	5–2	4–3	3–3	8–11	3–3	3–4	11–8	3–4	5–2	—	5–2	11–9
Washington	5–2	9–10	3–4	6–1	2–5	1–5	13–6	2–4	8–11	11–8	5–2	4–2	2–4	2–5	—	9–11

The October 1 tiebreaker games were regular-season games that are included here.

=== Detailed records ===
As of October 1, 2018. Season complete.

National League
Opponent	W	L	WP	RS	RA
NL East
Atlanta Braves	1	5	0.167	9	21
Miami Marlins	4	1	0.800	20	14
New York Mets	4	3	0.571	30	28
Philadelphia Phillies	1	6	0.143	16	39
Washington Nationals	2	5	0.286	19	35
Total	12	20	0.375	94	137
NL Central
Chicago Cubs	9	10	0.474	64	69
Cincinnati Reds	14	5	0.737	110	63
Milwaukee Brewers	12	7	0.632	90	73
**Pittsburgh Pirates**					
St. Louis Cardinals	8	11	0.421	76	84
Total	43	33	0.566	340	289
NL West
Arizona Diamondbacks	1	6	0.143	24	47
Colorado Rockies	3	3	0.500	26	17
Los Angeles Dodgers	1	5	0.167	26	53
San Diego Padres	3	4	0.429	30	33
San Francisco Giants	4	3	0.571	44	34
Total	12	21	0.364	150	184
American League
Chicago White Sox	4	0	1.000	26	13
Cleveland Indians	2	1	0.667	16	8
Detroit Tigers	5	1	0.833	41	32
Kansas City Royals	3	0	1.000	11	8
Minnesota Twins	1	3	0.250	14	22
Total	15	5	0.750	108	83
Season Total	82	79	0.509	692	693

Month	Games	Won	Lost	Win %	RS	RA
March	1	1	0	1.000	13	10
April	28	16	12	0.571	129	112
May	27	12	15	0.444	123	132
June	26	10	16	0.385	97	116
July	26	17	9	0.654	127	114
August	27	10	17	0.370	94	105
September	26	16	10	0.615	109	104
Total	161	82	79	0.509	692	693

	Games	Won	Lost	Win %	RS	RA
Home	80	44	36	0.550	326	318
Away	81	38	43	0.469	366	375
Total	161	82	79	0.509	692	693

=== Game log ===
2018 Game Log: 82–79 (Home: 44–36; Away: 38–43)
March: 1–0 (Home: 0–0; Away: 1–0)

#	Date	Opponent	Score	Win	Loss	Save	Attendance	Record	Streak
—	March 29	@ Tigers	PPD, RAIN; rescheduled for Mar. 30						
1	March 30	@ Tigers	13–10 (13)	**Brault** (1–0)	Wilson (0–1)	—	42,516	1–0	W1
—	March 31	@ Tigers	PPD, RAIN; rescheduled for Apr. 1						

April: 16–12 (Home: 10–5; Away: 6–7)

#	Date	Opponent	Score	Win	Loss	Save	Attendance	Record	Streak
2	April 1	@ Tigers	1–0	**Williams** (1–0)	Fulmer (0–1)	**Vázquez** (1)	14,858	2–0	W2
3	April 1	@ Tigers	8–6	**Kuhl** (1–0)	Farmer (0–1)	**Vázquez** (2)	18,438	3–0	W3
4	April 2	Twins	5–4	**Taillon** (1–0)	Lynn (0–1)	**Kontos** (1)	30,186	4–0	W4
5	April 4	Twins	3–7	Odorizzi (1–0)	**Nova** (0–1)	—	20,690	4–1	L1
6	April 5	Reds	5–2	**Brault** (2–0)	Bailey (0–2)	**Vázquez** (3)	9,227	5–1	W1
7	April 6	Reds	14–3	**Williams** (2–0)	Castillo (0–2)	—	11,115	6–1	W2
8	April 7	Reds	4–7	Peralta (1–0)	**Kontos** (0–1)	Iglesias (2)	14,336	6–2	L1
9	April 8	Reds	5–0	**Taillon** (2–0)	Mahle (1–1)	—	11,251	7–2	W1
—	April 9	@ Cubs	PPD, SNOW; rescheduled for Apr. 10						
10	April 10	@ Cubs	8–5	**Nova** (1–1)	Chatwood (0–2)	**Vázquez** (4)	40,144	8–2	W2
11	April 11	@ Cubs	5–13	Duensing (1–0)	**Glasnow** (0–1)	—	35,596	8–3	L1
12	April 12	@ Cubs	6–1	**Williams** (3–0)	Hendricks (0–1)	—	29,949	9–3	W1
13	April 13	@ Marlins	2–7	Peters (2–1)	**Kuhl** (1–1)	—	6,852	9–4	L1
14	April 14	@ Marlins	1–0	**Kontos** (1–1)	Ziegler (0–3)	**Vázquez** (5)	26,816	10–4	W1
15	April 15	@ Marlins	7–3	**Nova** (1–1)	Ureña (0–3)	—	10,621	11–4	W2
16	April 16	Rockies	2–6	Márquez (1–1)	**Brault** (2–1)	—	8,958	11–5	L1
17	April 17	Rockies	0–2	Bettis (3–0)	**Williams** (3–1)	Davis (8)	8,869	11–6	L2
18	April 18	Rockies	10–2	**Kuhl** (2–1)	Freeland (0–3)	—	8,970	12–6	W1
19	April 19	@ Phillies	0–7	Arrieta (2–0)	**Taillon** (2–1)	—	19,071	12–7	L1
20	April 20	@ Phillies	1–2	García (2–1)	**Kontos** (1–2)	Neris (3)	20,183	12–8	L2
21	April 21	@ Phillies	2–6	Nola (2–1)	**Feliz** (0–1)	Neris (4)	28,161	12–9	L3
22	April 22	@ Phillies	2–3 (11)	Ríos (3–0)	**Rodríguez** (0–1)	—	29,199	12–10	L4
—	April 24	Tigers	PPD, RAIN; rescheduled for Apr. 25						
23	April 25	Tigers	10–13	Stumpf (1–0)	**Taillon** (2–2)	Greene (4)	N/A	12–11	L5
24	April 25	Tigers	8–3	**Kuhl** (3–1)	Boyd (0–2)	—	9,396	13–11	W1
25	April 26	Tigers	1–0	**Vázquez** (1–0)	Wilson (0–3)	—	12,049	14–11	W2
26	April 27	Cardinals	6–5 (11)	**Kontos** (2–2)	Hicks (1–1)	—	15,748	15–11	W3
27	April 28	Cardinals	6–2	**Williams** (4–1)	Flaherty (0–1)	—	18,568	16–11	W4
28	April 29	Cardinals	5–0	**Kingham** (1–0)	Weaver (2–2)	—	14,378	17–11	W5
29	April 30	@ Nationals	2–3	Roark (2–2)	**Taillon** (2–3)	Kintzler (1)	20,879	17–12	L1

May: 12–15 (Home: 7–8; Away: 5–7)

#	Date	Opponent	Score	Win	Loss	Save	Attendance	Record	Streak
30	May 1	@ Nationals	4–12	Scherzer (6–1)	**Kuhl** (3–2)	—	23,534	17–13	L2
31	May 2	@ Nationals	3–9	Strasburg (3–3)	**Nova** (2–2)	—	27,086	17–14	L3
32	May 3	@ Nationals	1–3	Solis (1–1)	**Williams** (4–2)	Doolittle (6)	30,434	17–15	L4
33	May 4	@ Brewers	6–4	**Kingham** (2–0)	Guerra (2–2)	**Vázquez** (6)	32,869	18–15	W1
34	May 5	@ Brewers	3–5	Hader (1–0)	**Kontos** (2–3)	—	32,720	18–16	L1
35	May 6	@ Brewers	9–0	**Kuhl** (4–2)	Anderson (3–3)	—	38,285	19–16	W1
36	May 8	@ White Sox	10–6	**Glasnow** (1–1)	Volstad (0–2)	—	12,871	20–16	W2
37	May 9	@ White Sox	6–5	**Rodríguez** (1–1)	Jones (2–1)	**Vázquez** (7)	12,476	21–16	W3
38	May 11	Giants	11–2	**Brault** (3–1)	Suarez (1–2)	—	34,720	22–16	W4
39	May 12	Giants	6–5	**Vázquez** (2–0)	Watson (1–2)	—	27,502	23–16	W5
40	May 13	Giants	0–5	Holland (2–4)	**Nova** (2–3)	—	22,649	23–17	L1
41	May 15	White Sox	7–0	**Williams** (5–2)	López (0–3)	—	11,847	24–17	W1
42	May 16	White Sox	3–2	**Santana** (1–0)	Soria (0–2)	**Vázquez** (8)	20,286	25–17	W2
43	May 17	Padres	5–4	**Santana** (2–0)	Strahm (0–1)	**Vázquez** (9)	11,404	26–17	W3
44	May 18	Padres	2–3	Ross (3–3)	**Nova** (2–4)	Hand (13)	18,920	26–18	L1
45	May 19	Padres	2–6	Richard (3–5)	**Kingham** (2–1)	—	20,578	26–19	L2
46	May 20	Padres	5–8	Yates (3–0)	**Vázquez** (2–1)	Hand (14)	17,783	26–20	L3
47	May 22	@ Reds	2–7	Harvey (1–2)	**Taillon** (2–4)	—	16,144	26–21	L4
48	May 23	@ Reds	5–4 (12)	**Brault** (4–1)	Floro (1–1)	**Crick** (1)	18,659	27–21	W1
49	May 24	@ Reds	4–5	Castillo (4–4)	**Nova** (2–5)	Hughes (2)	14,853	27–22	L1
50	May 25	Cardinals	8–1	**Musgrove** (1–0)	Gant (1–2)	—	22,629	28–22	W1
51	May 26	Cardinals	1–4	Flaherty (2–1)	**Williams** (5–3)	Norris (10)	22,133	28–23	L1
52	May 27	Cardinals	4–6	Tuivailala (1–0)	**Feliz** (0–2)	Norris (11)	19,608	28–24	L2
53	May 28	Cubs	0–7	Montgomery (1–1)	**Kuhl** (4–3)	—	19,382	28–25	L3
54	May 29	Cubs	6–8	Lester (5–2)	**Santana** (2–1)	Morrow (12)	11,475	28–26	L4
55	May 30	Cubs	2–1	**Musgrove** (2–0)	Hendricks (4–4)	**Vázquez** (10)	14,126	29–26	W1
56	May 31	@ Cardinals	8–10	Mayers (2–0)	**Vázquez** (2–2)	—	40,832	29–27	L1

June: 10–16 (Home: 4–8; Away: 6–8)

#	Date	Opponent	Score	Win	Loss	Save	Attendance	Record	Streak
57	June 1	@ Cardinals	4–0	**Taillon** (3–4)	Mikolas (6–1)	—	47,135	30–27	W1
58	June 2	@ Cardinals	2–3	Norris (2–1)	**Rodríguez** (1–2)	—	44,492	30–28	L1
59	June 3	@ Cardinals	0–5	Wacha (7–1)	**Kingham** (2–2)	—	44,432	30–29	L2
60	June 5	Dodgers	0–5	Stripling (4–1)	**Musgrove** (2–1)	—	12,879	30–30	L3
61	June 6	Dodgers	11–9	**Brault** (5–1)	Hudson (1–2)	**Vázquez** (11)	14,327	31–30	W1
62	June 7	Dodgers	7–8	Báez (3–3)	**Taillon** (3–5)	Jansen (15)	19,713	31–31	L1
63	June 8	@ Cubs	1–3	Montgomery (2–1)	**Kuhl** (4–4)	Strop (1)	40,097	31–32	L2
64	June 9	@ Cubs	0–2	Lester (7–2)	**Kingham** (2–3)	Cishek (2)	41,045	31–33	L3
65	June 10	@ Cubs	7–1	**Nova** (3–5)	Hendricks (4–6)	—	40,735	32–33	W1
66	June 11	@ Diamondbacks	5–9	Bradley (2–1)	**Crick** (0–1)	—	20,927	32–34	L1
67	June 12	@ Diamondbacks	8–13	Salas (4–4)	**Williams** (5–4)	—	22,488	32–35	L2
68	June 13	@ Diamondbacks	5–4	**Taillon** (4–5)	Greinke (5–5)	**Vázquez** (12)	32,803	33–35	W1
69	June 15	Reds	3–2	**Kuhl** (5–4)	Harvey (1–5)	**Vázquez** (13)	23,007	34–35	W2
70	June 16	Reds	6–2	**Nova** (4–5)	Castillo (4–8)	—	27,479	35–35	W3
71	June 17	Reds	6–8	DeSclafani (2–1)	**Musgrove** (2–2)	Iglesias (10)	23,042	35–36	L1
72	June 18	Brewers	1–0	**Williams** (6–4)	Chacín (6–2)	**Vázquez** (14)	10,672	36–36	W1
73	June 19	Brewers	2–3	Peralta (2–0)	**Taillon** (4–6)	Knebel (7)	14,152	36–37	L1
—	June 20	Brewers	PPD, RAIN; rescheduled for July 14						
74	June 21	Diamondbacks	3–9	Godley (8–5)	**Kuhl** (5–5)	—	20,554	36–38	L2
75	June 22	Diamondbacks	1–2 (13)	Chafin (1–2)	**Glasnow** (1–2)	McFarland (1)	28,843	36–39	L3
76	June 23	Diamondbacks	2–7	Greinke (7–5)	**Musgrove** (2–3)	—	21,121	36–40	L4
77	June 24	Diamondbacks	0–3	Buchholz (2–1)	**Williams** (6–5)	Boxberger (17)	19,207	36–41	L5
78	June 25	@ Mets	6–4	**Taillon** (5–6)	Lugo (2–3)	**Vázquez** (15)	22,135	37–41	W1
79	June 26	@ Mets	3–4 (10)	Peterson (1–0)	**Brault** (5–2)	—	24,501	37–42	L1
80	June 27	@ Mets	5–3	**Vázquez** (3–2)	Familia (3–4)	—	24,506	38–42	W1
81	June 29	@ Padres	6–3	**Musgrove** (3–3)	Lauer (3–5)	**Vázquez** (16)	27,083	39–42	W2
82	June 30	@ Padres	3–4	Lucchesi (4–3)	**Williams** (6–6)	Hand (23)	32,418	39–43	L1

July: 17–9 (Home: 11–5; Away: 6–4)

#	Date	Opponent	Score	Win	Loss	Save	Attendance	Record	Streak
83	July 1	@ Padres	7–5	**Crick** (1–1)	Ross (5–6)	**Vázquez** (17)	32,099	40–43	W1
84	July 2	@ Dodgers	1–17	Wood (5–5)	**Kingham** (2–4)	Ferguson (1)	45,207	40–44	L1
85	July 3	@ Dodgers	3–8	Kershaw (2–4)	**Nova** (4–6)	—	48,819	40–45	L2
86	July 4	@ Dodgers	4–6	Hill (2–3)	**Holmes** (0–1)	Jansen (23)	53,139	40–46	L3
87	July 6	Phillies	5–17	Ramos (3–0)	**Williams** (6–7)	—	24,846	40–47	L4
88	July 7	Phillies	2–3	Arrieta (6–6)	**Taillon** (5–7)	Arano (2)	28,150	40–48	L5
89	July 8	Phillies	4–1	**Kingham** (3–4)	Anderson (0–1)	**Vázquez** (18)	19,542	41–48	W1
90	July 9	Nationals	6–3	**Nova** (5–6)	Rodríguez (0–1)	**Vázquez** (19)	14,073	42–48	W2
91	July 10	Nationals	1–5	Hellickson (3–1)	**Musgrove** (3–4)	—	17,103	42–49	L1
92	July 11	Nationals	2–0	**Williams** (7–7)	González (6–6)	**Vázquez** (20)	21,083	43–49	W1
93	July 12	Brewers	6–3	**Taillon** (6–7)	Miley (1–1)	**Vázquez** (21)	17,858	44–49	W2
94	July 13	Brewers	7–3	**Kingham** (4–4)	Guerra (6–6)	**Crick** (2)	21,431	45–49	W3
95	July 14	Brewers	2–1	**Rodríguez** (2–2)	Anderson (6–7)	**Vázquez** (22)	24,474	46–49	W4
96	July 14	Brewers	6–2	**Holmes** (1–1)	Suter (8–6)	**Vázquez** (23)	24,474	47–49	W5
97	July 15	Brewers	7–6 (10)	**Anderson** (1–0)	Jennings (3–3)	—	17,583	48–49	W6
**89th All-Star Game in Washington, D.C.**
98	July 20	@ Reds	12–1	**Taillon** (7–7)	Mahle (7–8)	—	20,726	49–49	W7
99	July 21	@ Reds	6–2	**Kingham** (5–4)	DeSclafani (4–3)	—	23,244	50–49	W8
100	July 22	@ Reds	9–2	**Nova** (6–6)	Harvey (5–6)	—	23,615	51–49	W9
101	July 23	@ Indians	7–0 (6)	**Williams** (8–7)	Kluber (12–6)	—	24,925	52–49	W10
102	July 24	@ Indians	9–4	**Musgrove** (4–4)	Bieber (5–2)	—	26,414	53–49	W11
103	July 25	@ Indians	0–4	Bauer (9–6)	**Taillon** (7–8)	Hand (25)	31,682	53–50	L1
104	July 26	Mets	6–12	Matz (5–8)	**Kingham** (5–5)	—	21,981	53–51	L2
105	July 27	Mets	5–4	**Vázquez** (4–2)	Peterson (2–2)	—	26,356	54–51	W1
106	July 28	Mets	5–0	**Williams** (9–7)	deGrom (5–6)	—	35,900	55–51	W2
107	July 29	Mets	0–1	Wheeler (5–6)	**Musgrove** (4–5)	Swarzak (3)	23,749	55–52	L1
108	July 31	Cubs	5–4	**Taillon** (8–8)	Lester (12–4)	**Vázquez** (24)	18,972	56–52	W1

August: 10–17 (Home: 3–8; Away: 7–9)

#	Date	Opponent	Score	Win	Loss	Save	Attendance	Record	Streak
109	August 1	Cubs	2–9	Hamels (6–9)	**Kingham** (5–6)	—	18,600	56–53	L1
110	August 3	Cardinals	7–6	**Crick** (2–1)	Hicks (3–3)	**Vázquez** (25)	26,773	57–53	W1
111	August 4	Cardinals	4–8	Hudson (2–0)	**McRae** (0–1)	—	32,473	57–54	L1
112	August 5	Cardinals	1–2	Flaherty (5–6)	**Williams** (9–8)	Norris (21)	19,376	57–55	L2
113	August 6	@ Rockies	0–2	Freeland (10–7)	**Musgrove** (4–6)	Davis (32)	34,471	57–56	L3
114	August 7	@ Rockies	10–2	**Taillon** (9–8)	Bettis (5–2)	—	31,649	58–56	W1
115	August 8	@ Rockies	4–3	**Archer** (4–5)	Márquez (9–9)	**Vázquez** (26)	35,702	59–56	W2
116	August 9	@ Giants	10–5	**Nova** (7–6)	Suárez (4–8)	—	40,035	60–56	W3
117	August 10	@ Giants	10–13	Holland (6–8)	**Holmes** (1–2)	—	41,762	60–57	L1
118	August 11	@ Giants	4–0	**Williams** (10–8)	Blach (6–7)	—	41,209	61–57	W1
119	August 12	@ Giants	3–4	Rodríguez (6–1)	**Musgrove** (4–7)	Smith (8)	41,980	61–58	L1
120	August 14	@ Twins	2–5	Odorizzi (5–7)	**Taillon** (9–9)	Hildenberger (2)	28,515	61–59	L2
121	August 15	@ Twins	4–6	Moya (3–0)	**Santana** (2–2)	Hildenberger (3)	26,191	61–60	L3
122	August 16	Cubs	0–1	Lester (13–5)	**Nova** (7–7)	Strop (10)	21,783	61–61	L4
123	August 17	Cubs	0–1	Hamels (8–9)	**Williams** (10–9)	Chavez (2)	24,298	61–62	L5
124	August 18	Cubs	3–1	**Musgrove** (5–7)	Chatwood (4–6)	**Vázquez** (27)	35,100	62–62	W1
125	August 19	Cubs	2–1 (11)	**Rodríguez** (3–2)	Kintzler (1–3)	—	24,283	63–62	W2
126	August 20	Braves	0–1	Wilson (1–0)	**Archer** (4–6)	Winkler (2)	16,445	63–63	L1
127	August 21	Braves	1–6	Gausman (8–9)	**Nova** (7–8)	—	13,280	63–64	L2
128	August 22	Braves	1–2	Teherán (9–7)	**Crick** (2–2)	Venters (2)	14,249	63–65	L3
129	August 24	@ Brewers	6–7 (15)	Lyles (3–4)	**Holmes** (1–3)	—	32,694	63–66	L4
130	August 25	@ Brewers	9–1	**Taillon** (10–9)	Chacín (13–5)	—	40,622	64–66	W1
131	August 26	@ Brewers	4–7	Anderson (9–7)	**Archer** (4–7)	Jeffress (7)	39,607	64–67	L1
132	August 28	@ Cardinals	2–5	Flaherty (8–6)	**Nova** (7–9)	Norris (28)	35,258	64–68	L2
133	August 29	@ Cardinals	2–0	**Williams** (11–9)	Mikolas (13–4)	**Vázquez** (28)	33,448	65–68	W1
134	August 30	@ Cardinals	0–5	Gant (6–5)	**Musgrove** (5–8)	—	38,561	65–69	L1
135	August 31	@ Braves	3–2	**Taillon** (11–9)	Brach (2–4)	**Vázquez** (29)	36,650	66–69	W1

September: 16–10 (Home: 9–2; Away: 7–8)

#	Date	Opponent	Score	Win	Loss	Save	Attendance	Record	Streak
136	September 1	@ Braves	3–5	Venters (3–1)	**Kela** (3–4)	Minter (12)	33,705	66–70	L1
137	September 2	@ Braves	1–5	Venters (4–1)	**Brault** (5–3)	—	37,475	66–71	L2
138	September 3	Reds	5–1	**Williams** (12–9)	Harvey (6–8)	—	13,843	67–71	W1
139	September 4	Reds	7–3	**Musgrove** (6–8)	Reed (0–2)	—	8,855	68–71	W2
140	September 5	Reds	3–2	**Taillon** (12–9)	Bailey (1–14)	**Vázquez** (30)	9,560	69–71	W3
141	September 7	Marlins	5–3	**Rodríguez** (4–2)	Guerrero (1–3)	**Vázquez** (31)	19,515	70–71	W4
142	September 8	Marlins	5–1	**Nova** (8–9)	Chen (6–10)	—	16,110	71–71	W5
–	September 9	Marlins	CANCELLED, RAIN; will not be made up						
143	September 10	@ Cardinals	7–8	Brebbia (2–3)	**Santana** (2–3)	Martínez (3)	33,566	71–72	L1
144	September 11	@ Cardinals	5–11	Mikolas (15–4)	**Musgrove** (6–9)	—	37,187	71–73	L2
145	September 12	@ Cardinals	4–3	**Taillon** (13–9)	Poncedeleon (0–2)	**Vázquez** (32)	39,606	72–73	W1
146	September 14	@ Brewers	4–7	Burnes (5–0)	**Archer** (4–8)	Jeffress (12)	39,482	72–74	L1
147	September 15	@ Brewers	3–1	**Nova** (9–9)	Davies (2–6)	**Vázquez** (33)	37,358	73–74	W1
148	September 16	@ Brewers	3–2	**Williams** (13–9)	Chacín (14–8)	**Vázquez** (34)	32,180	74–74	W2
149	September 17	Royals	7–6	**Santana** (3–3)	Lively (0–3)	—	10,316	75–74	W3
150	September 18	Royals	2–1 (11)	**Crick** (3–2)	Smith (1–5)	—	11,566	76–74	W4
151	September 19	Royals	2–1	**Archer** (5–8)	Fillmyer (3–2)	**Vázquez** (35)	13,073	77–74	W5
152	September 21	Brewers	3–8	Burnes (6–0)	**Santana** (3–4)	—	19,243	77–75	L1
153	September 22	Brewers	3–0	**Williams** (14–9)	Davies (2–7)	**Vázquez** (36)	23,070	78–75	W1
154	September 23	Brewers	6–13	Knebel (3–3)	**Kingham** (5–7)	—	20,623	78–76	L1
155	September 24	@ Cubs	5–1	**Taillon** (14–9)	Hamels (9–11)	—	34,570	79–76	W1
156	September 25	@ Cubs	6–0	**Archer** (6–8)	Montgomery (5–6)	—	33,443	80–76	W2
157	September 26	@ Cubs	6–7 (10)	Kintzler (3–3)	**Rodríguez** (4–3)	—	32,874	80–77	L1
158	September 27	@ Cubs	0–3	Lester (18–6)	**Williams** (14–10)	Chavez (5)	38,415	80–78	L2
159	September 28	@ Reds	8–4	**Brault** (6–3)	DeSclafani (7–8)	—	19,689	81–78	W1
160	September 29	@ Reds	0–3	Lorenzen (4–2)	**Taillon** (14–10)	Iglesias (30)	42,630	81–79	L1
161	September 30	@ Reds	6–5 (10)	**Feliz** (1–2)	Stephens (2–3)	**Vázquez** (37)	25,091	82–79	W1

Legend: = Win = Loss = Postponement
Bold = Pirates team member

== Roster ==
2018 Pittsburgh Pirates
Roster
Pitchers: 52 Tanner Anderson; 24 Chris Archer; 43 Steven Brault; 57 Nick Burdi; 30 Kyle Crick; 45 Michael Feliz; 24 Tyler Glasnow; 68 Clay Holmes; 35 Keone Kela; 49 Nick Kingham; 70 George Kontos; 39 Chad Kuhl; 51 Alex McRae; 59 Joe Musgrove; 66 Dovydas Neverauskas; 46 Iván Nova; 48 Richard Rodríguez; 72 Enny Romero; 65 Casey Sadler; 37 Edgar Santana; 53 Josh Smoker; 50 Jameson Taillon; 73 Felipe Vázquez; 34 Trevor Williams	Catchers: 29 Francisco Cervelli; 32 Elías Díaz; 58 Jacob Stallings; Infielders: 55 Josh Bell; 26 Adam Frazier; 23 David Freese; 5 Josh Harrison; 15 Adeiny Hechavarria; 16 Jung-ho Kang; 44 Kevin Kramer; 10 Jordy Mercer; 19 Colin Moran; 38 Max Moroff; 27 Kevin Newman; 36 José Osuna; 3 Sean Rodriguez	Outfielders: 44 Chris Bostick; 12 Corey Dickerson; 47 Jordan Luplow; 6 Starling Marté; 17 Austin Meadows; 25 Gregory Polanco; 15 Pablo Reyes; Other batters: 63 Ryan Lavarnway	Manager: 13 Clint Hurdle; Coaches: 86 Heberto Andrade (bullpen catcher); 18 Kimera Bartee (first base); 2 Jeff Branson (hitting); 89 Jordan Comadena (bullpen catcher); 28 Joey Cora (third base); 85 Dave Jauss (coach); 75 Jeff Livesey (assistant hitting); 87 Justin Meccage (assistant pitching); 14 Tom Prince (bench); 56 Euclides Rojas (bullpen); 54 Ray Searage (pitching)

=== Opening Day lineup ===
Opening Day Starters
Name	Position
Adam Frazier	DH
Josh Harrison	2B
Gregory Polanco	RF
Josh Bell	1B
Corey Dickerson	LF
Starling Marte	CF
Francisco Cervelli	C
Colin Moran	3B
Jordy Mercer	SS
Iván Nova	SP

== Player stats ==
=== Batting ===
Note: G = Games played; AB = At bats; R = Runs; H = Hits; 2B = Doubles; 3B = Triples; HR = Home runs; RBI = Runs batted in; SB = Stolen bases; BB = Walks; AVG = Batting average; SLG = Slugging average

Player	G	AB	R	H	2B	3B	HR	RBI	SB	BB	AVG	SLG
Starling Marte	145	559	81	155	32	5	20	72	33	35	.277	.460
Corey Dickerson	135	504	65	151	35	7	13	55	8	21	.300	.474
Josh Bell	148	501	74	131	31	4	12	62	2	77	.261	.411
Gregory Polanco	130	461	75	117	32	6	23	81	12	61	.254	.499
Colin Moran	144	415	49	115	19	1	11	58	0	39	.277	.407
Jordy Mercer	117	394	43	99	29	2	6	39	2	32	.251	.381
Josh Harrison	97	344	41	86	13	1	8	37	3	18	.250	.363
Francisco Cervelli	104	332	39	86	15	3	12	57	2	51	.259	.431
Adam Frazier	113	318	52	88	23	2	10	35	1	29	.277	.456
Elías Díaz	82	252	33	72	12	0	10	34	0	21	.286	.452
David Freese	94	241	29	68	10	1	9	42	0	18	.282	.444
Austin Meadows	49	154	16	45	8	2	5	13	4	8	.292	.468
Sean Rodriguez	66	150	21	25	5	1	5	19	1	22	.167	.313
José Osuna	51	106	14	24	9	0	3	11	0	3	.226	.396
Jordan Luplow	37	92	16	17	1	3	3	7	2	10	.185	.359
Kevin Newman	31	91	7	19	2	0	0	6	0	4	.209	.231
Max Moroff	26	59	7	11	1	0	3	9	0	7	.186	.356
Pablo Reyes	18	58	9	17	2	0	3	7	0	5	.293	.483
Adeiny Hechavarria	15	43	2	10	4	0	1	3	0	3	.233	.395
Jacob Stallings	14	37	2	8	0	0	0	5	0	3	.216	.216
Kevin Kramer	21	37	5	5	0	0	0	4	0	2	.135	.135
Ryan Lavarnway	6	6	1	4	1	0	0	1	0	0	.667	.833
Jung-ho Kang	3	6	0	2	0	0	0	0	0	0	.333	.333
Christopher Bostick	2	2	0	0	0	0	0	0	0	0	.000	.000
Pitcher totals	161	285	11	26	6	0	0	8	0	5	.091	.112
Team totals	161	5447	692	1381	290	38	157	665	70	474	.254	.407

=== Pitching ===
Note: W = Wins; L = Losses; ERA = Earned run average; G = Games pitched; GS = Games started; SV = Saves; IP = Innings pitched; H = Hits allowed; R = Runs allowed; ER = Earned runs allowed; BB = Walks allowed; SO = Strikeouts

Player	W	L	ERA	G	GS	SV	IP	H	R	ER	BB	SO
Jameson Taillon	14	10	3.20	32	32	0	191.0	179	69	68	46	179
Trevor Williams	14	10	3.11	31	31	0	170.2	146	64	59	55	126
Iván Nova	9	9	4.19	29	29	0	161.0	171	82	75	35	114
Joe Musgrove	6	9	4.06	19	19	0	115.1	113	56	52	23	100
Steven Brault	6	3	4.61	45	5	0	91.2	84	51	47	57	82
Chad Kuhl	5	5	4.55	16	16	0	85.0	89	47	43	33	81
Nick Kingham	5	7	5.21	18	15	0	76.0	79	50	44	26	69
Felipe Vázquez	4	2	2.70	70	0	37	70.0	63	24	21	24	89
Richard Rodríguez	4	3	2.47	63	0	0	69.1	55	19	19	19	88
Edgar Santana	3	4	3.26	69	0	0	66.1	61	25	24	12	54
Kyle Crick	3	2	2.39	64	0	2	60.1	45	18	16	23	65
Tyler Glasnow	1	2	4.34	34	0	0	56.0	47	28	27	34	72
Chris Archer	3	3	4.30	10	10	0	52.1	53	27	25	18	60
Michael Feliz	1	2	5.66	47	0	0	47.2	49	33	30	23	55
Dovydas Neverauskas	0	0	8.00	25	0	0	27.0	30	25	24	10	27
Clay Holmes	1	3	6.84	11	4	0	26.1	30	21	20	23	21
George Kontos	2	3	5.03	21	0	1	19.2	23	12	11	5	9
Keone Kela	0	1	2.93	16	0	0	15.1	10	5	5	5	22
Tanner Anderson	1	0	6.35	6	0	0	11.1	15	10	8	8	6
Alex McRae	0	1	5.68	2	0	0	6.1	8	4	4	5	5
Josh Smoker	0	0	11.12	7	0	0	5.2	11	7	7	5	2
Casey Sadler	0	0	8.31	2	0	0	4.1	9	7	4	3	3
Enny Romero	0	0	4.50	2	0	0	4.0	7	5	2	3	5
Nick Burdi	0	0	20.25	2	0	0	1.1	3	4	3	2	2
Team totals	82	79	4.00	161	161	40	1434.0	1380	693	637	497	1336

=== Disabled lists ===
==== 7-day disabled list ====
Player	Injury	Placed	Activated
Francisco Cervelli	Concussion	June 22, 2018	July 1, 2018
Francisco Cervelli	Concussion	July 14, 2018	July 26, 2018

==== 10-day disabled list ====
Player	Injury	Placed	Activated
A. J. Schugel	Right Shoulder Injury	March 26, 2018	June 27, 2018
Joe Musgrove	Right Shoulder Strain	April 2, 2018	May 25, 2018
Josh Harrison	Fracture of 5th Metacarpal Bone in Left Hand	April 16, 2018	May 20, 2018
Enny Romero	Left Shoulder Impingement	April 26, 2018	July 2, 2018
Starling Marte	Right Oblique Strain	May 16, 2018	May 26, 2018
Iván Nova	Right Ring Finger Sprain	May 25, 2018	June 10, 2018
Richard Rodríguez	Right Shoulder Inflammation	June 8, 2018	June 18, 2018
Michael Feliz	Right Shoulder Inflammation	June 24, 2018	July 7, 2018
Sean Rodriguez	Right Quadriceps Strain	June 25, 2018	July 20, 2018
Chad Kuhl	Right Forearm Strain	June 27, 2018	July 31, 2018
Francisco Cervelli	Concussion	July 1, 2018	July 8, 2018
Joe Musgrove	Right Index Finger Infection	July 3, 2018	July 10, 2018
Josh Bell	Left Oblique Strain	July 28, 2018	August 8, 2018
Corey Dickerson	Strained Left Hamstring	July 28, 2018	August 4, 2018
Sean Rodriguez	Left Abdomen Strain	August 6, 2018	August 24, 2018
Jordy Mercer	Left Calf Strain	August 15, 2018	August 29, 2018
Gregory Polanco	Dislocated Left Shoulder and Bone Bruise on Left Knee	September 15, 2018	October 2, 2018

==== 60-day disabled list ====
Player	Injury	Placed	Activated
Nick Burdi	Recovery from Tommy John Surgery	February 20, 2018	September 1, 2018
A. J. Schugel	Right Shoulder Injury	June 27, 2018	August 25, 2018
Nik Turley	Left Elbow Sprain	June 28, 2018	October 4, 2018
Chad Kuhl	Right Forearm Strain	July 31, 2018	November 2, 2018

== Notable achievements ==
=== Awards ===
National League Player of the Week

- Jameson Taillon (April 2-April 8)

National League Rookie of the Month

- Austin Meadows (May)

2018 Major League Baseball All-Star Game

- Felipe Vázquez, P

== Transactions ==
The Pirates were involved in the following transactions during the 2018 season:

=== Trades ===
November 20, 2017	To Toronto Blue Jays: Gift Ngoepe	To Pittsburgh Pirates: Player To Be Named Later or Cash
December 14, 2017	To Philadelphia Phillies: Future Considerations	To Pittsburgh Pirates: Nick Burdi
January 13, 2018	To Houston Astros: Gerrit Cole	To Pittsburgh Pirates: Colin Moran; Jason Martin; Joe Musgrove; Michael Feliz
January 15, 2018	To San Francisco Giants: Andrew McCutchen	To Pittsburgh Pirates: Kyle Crick; Bryan Reynolds; Future Considerations
January 17, 2018	To Atlanta Braves: Shane Carle	To Pittsburgh Pirates: Player To Be Named Later or Cash
January 31, 2018	To New York Mets: Daniel Zamora; Cash Considerations	To Pittsburgh Pirates: Josh Smoker
February 20, 2018	To Boston Red Sox: Cash	To Pittsburgh Pirates: Bryce Brentz
February 22, 2018	To Tampa Bay Rays: Daniel Hudson; Tristan Gray; Cash	To Pittsburgh Pirates: Corey Dickerson
April 27, 2018	To Chicago White Sox: Todd Cunningham	To Pittsburgh Pirates: Player To Be Named Later
July 31, 2018	To Texas Rangers: Taylor Hearn; Sherten Apostel	To Pittsburgh Pirates: Keone Kela
July 31, 2018	To Tampa Bay Rays: Austin Meadows; Tyler Glasnow; Shane Baz	To Pittsburgh Pirates: Chris Archer
August 6, 2018	To Tampa Bay Rays: Matt Seelinger	To Pittsburgh Pirates: Adeiny Hechavarria
August 31, 2018	To Los Angeles Dodgers: David Freese	To Pittsburgh Pirates: Jesus Manuel Valdez
August 31, 2018	To New York Yankees: Adeiny Hechavarria	To Pittsburgh Pirates: Player To Be Named Later or Cash

=== Free agents ===
Player	Acquired from	Lost to	Date	Contract terms
Todd Cunningham	Los Angeles Dodgers		December 7, 2017	Minor league contract
Richard Rodríguez	Baltimore Orioles		December 7, 2017	Minor league contract
Bo Schultz	Toronto Blue Jays		January 5, 2018	Minor league contract
Tyler Jones	New York Yankees		January 5, 2018	Minor league contract
John Stilson	Toronto Blue Jays		January 10, 2018	Minor league contract
Linse Carvajal	None		January 20, 2018	Minor league contract
Yeison Ceballo	None		January 20, 2018	Minor league contract
Miguel Peralta	None		January 20, 2018	Minor league contract
Oliver Mateo	None		January 20, 2018	Minor league contract
Ryan Lavarnway	Oakland Athletics		January 22, 2018	Minor league contract
Edgar Barrios	None		January 24, 2018	Minor league contract
Valentin Linarez	None		January 25, 2018	Minor league contract
Joelvis Del Rosario	None		January 25, 2018	Minor league contract
Mariano Dotel	None		January 25, 2018	Minor league contract
Estalin Ortiz	None		February 3, 2018	Minor league contract
Daniel Nava	Philadelphia Phillies		February 6, 2018	Minor league contract
Chris Stewart		Atlanta Braves	February 14, 2018	1 year
Michael Saunders	Toronto Blue Jays		February 21, 2018	Minor league contract
Kevin Siegrist	Philadelphia Phillies		February 24, 2018	Minor league contract

=== Waivers ===
Player	Claimed from	Lost to	Date
Nik Turley	Minnesota Twins		November 6, 2017
Sam Moll	Oakland Athletics		November 27, 2017
Sam Moll		Seattle Mariners	November 30, 2017
Engelb Vielma	Philadelphia Phillies		December 11, 2017
Jordan Milbrath	Cleveland Indians		December 14, 2017
Shane Carle	Colorado Rockies		January 4, 2018
Johnny Barbato		Detroit Tigers	January 11, 2018
Engelb Vielma		San Francisco Giants	January 18, 2018
Bryce Brentz		New York Mets	March 26, 2018
Jack Leathersich		Cleveland Indians	March 27, 2018
Jordan Milbrath		Cleveland Indians	March 27, 2018
Jesús Liranzo	Los Angeles Dodgers		April 5, 2018
Enny Romero	Washington Nationals		April 14, 2018

=== Signings ===
Name	Date	Details
Felipe Vázquez	January 19, 2018	4 years/$22 million

=== Other ===
Name	Date	Details
Justin Meccage	December 1, 2017	Named Assistant Pitching Coach

== Farm system ==
List of minor leagues staff:

Level	Team	League	Manager
AAA	Indianapolis Indians	International League	Brian Esposito
AA	Altoona Curve	Eastern League	Michael Ryan
A	Bradenton Marauders	Florida State League	Gera Alvarez
A	West Virginia Power	South Atlantic League	Wyatt Toregas
Short-Season A	West Virginia Black Bears	New York–Penn League	Kieran Mattison
Rookie	Bristol Pirates	Appalachian League	Miguel Pérez
Rookie	GCL Pirates	Gulf Coast League	Dave Turgeon
Rookie	DSL Pirates	Dominican Summer League	Gavi Nivar
