= Nick Kingham =

American baseball player (born 1991)

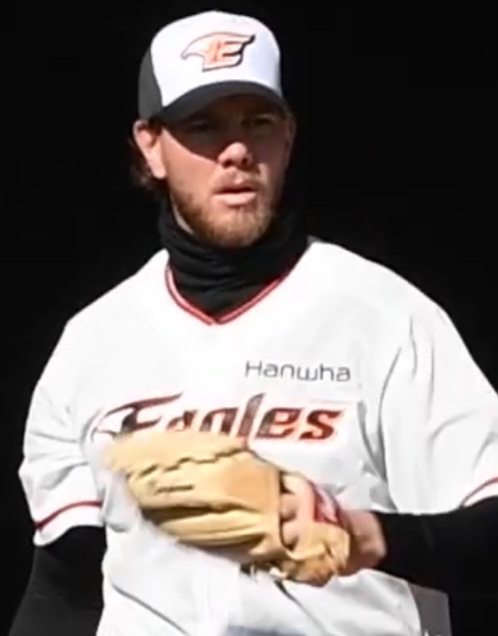
- Kingham with the Hanwha Eagles
- Pitcher
- Born: November 8, 1991 (age 34); Houston, Texas, U.S.
- Batted: Right Threw: Right

Professional debut
- MLB: April 29, 2018, for the Pittsburgh Pirates
- KBO: May 5, 2020, for the SK Wyverns
- CPBL: May 30, 2023, for the CTBC Brothers

Last appearance
- MLB: August 2, 2019, for the Toronto Blue Jays
- KBO: April 16, 2022, for the Hanwha Eagles
- CPBL: June 28, 2023, for the CTBC Brothers

MLB statistics
- Win–loss record: 9–9
- Earned run average: 6.08
- Strikeouts: 115

KBO statistics
- Win–loss record: 11–12
- Earned run average: 3.37
- Strikeouts: 155

CPBL statistics
- Win–loss record: 3–0
- Earned run average: 7.71
- Strikeouts: 13
- Stats at Baseball Reference

Teams
- Pittsburgh Pirates (2018–2019); Toronto Blue Jays (2019); SK Wyverns (2020); Hanwha Eagles (2021–2022); CTBC Brothers (2023)

Nicholas Gordon Kingham (born November 8, 1991) is an American former professional baseball pitcher. He played in Major League Baseball (MLB) for the Pittsburgh Pirates and the Toronto Blue Jays, in the KBO League for the SK Wyverns and Hanwha Eagles, and in the Chinese Professional Baseball League (CPBL) for the CTBC Brothers.

== Career ==
=== Pittsburgh Pirates ===
Kingham attended Sierra Vista High School in Las Vegas, Nevada. In 2010, his senior season, he was 8–3 with a 2.01 ERA in 13 games. After his senior year, he was drafted by the Pittsburgh Pirates in the fourth round of the 2010 Major League Baseball draft out of Sierra Vista High School in Las Vegas, Nevada. He signed with the Pirates for a signing bonus worth $480,000, forgoing his commitment to play college baseball at the University of Oregon. He made his professional debut in August 2010 with the Gulf Coast League Pirates. He spent the 2011 season with the State College Spikes and the 2012 season with the West Virginia Power.

Kingham started the 2013 season with the High-A Bradenton Marauders and was promoted to Double-A Altoona Curve during the season. He was voted to the 2013 Florida State League All-Star Game. He spent the 2014 season with Altoona and the Triple-A Indianapolis Indians. Kingham was added to the 40-man roster on November 20, 2014.

Prior to the 2015 season, Kingham was ranked as the 67th best prospect in baseball by Baseball Prospectus. Kingham underwent Tommy John surgery in May 2015. He would miss the rest of the 2015 season before returning to make rehab starts in July 2016. Kingham finished the 2016 season with 10 starts across the rookie, Single-A and Double-A levels. In 2017, Kingham suffered an ankle injury during spring training which delayed his season debut until May.

Kingham began the 2018 season with Indianapolis. He was named International League Pitcher of the Week on April 16, 2018. Kingham made his major league debut on April 29, 2018, against the St. Louis Cardinals. During his debut, Kingham took a perfect game through 6 2/3 innings before allowing a single to Paul DeJong. Kingham went on to record his first career win as the Pirates won 5–0.

On April 30, 2018, Pirates manager Clint Hurdle announced that Kingham would remain in the Pirates rotation, with Steven Brault moving to the bullpen to make room. In 18 games (15 starts), he finished 5–7 with an ERA of 5.21 in 76 innings.

Kingham began 2019 in Pittsburgh's bullpen before moving to the starting rotation. He was moved back to the bullpen in May. He was designated for assignment on June 8 after going 1–1 with a 9.87 ERA in 34 2/3 innings.

=== Toronto Blue Jays ===
Kingham was traded to the Toronto Blue Jays on June 13, 2019, in exchange for cash considerations. He was activated on June 15, but was designated by the team for assignment on July 18. Kingham cleared waivers and was sent outright to the Triple-A Buffalo Bisons on July 21. He was added back the Blue Jays' active roster on August 2. Kingham made 11 total appearances for Toronto, compiling a 3-1 record and 3.00 ERA with 14 strikeouts over 21 innings of work. On August 25, Kingham was designated for assignment by the Blue Jays. He was released by the team the following day.

=== SK Wyverns ===
On November 28, 2019, Kingham signed a one-year contract with the SK Wyverns of the KBO League. On July 2, 2020, Kingham was released by the Wyverns, having struggled to an 0-2 record and 6.75 ERA across two starts.

=== Hanwha Eagles ===
On November 28, 2020, Kingham signed a one-year contract with the Hanwha Eagles of the KBO League, worth $250,000 and a $100,000 signing bonus. He made 25 starts for Hanwha in 2021, pitching to a 10–8 record and 3.19 ERA with 131 strikeouts in 144 innings pitched.

On December 28, 2021, Kingham re-signed with the Eagles for the 2022 season for $900,000. He made 3 starts for the team, logging a 1–2 record and 2.76 ERA with 18 strikeouts in 16 1/3 innings of work. The Eagles released Kingham on June 2, 2022, due to an arm injury.

=== Diablos Rojos del México ===
On February 27, 2023, Kingham signed with the Diablos Rojos del México of the Mexican League. He made one start, giving up two earned runs in five innings pitched. On May 2, Kingham was released in order to pursue an opportunity in Asia.

=== CTBC Brothers ===
On May 3, 2023, Kingham signed with the CTBC Brothers of the Chinese Professional Baseball League (CPBL). In 5 starts for the Brothers, he went 3–0 with a 7.71 ERA and 13 strikeouts in 23 1/3 innings pitched. On July 13, Kingham was released by the club. It was subsequently reported that the release was a result of Kingham deciding to retire from professional baseball.

== Personal life ==
Nick's brother, Nolan, is also a professional baseball player.
