= 2024 Lithuanian Baseball League =

- League: Lithuanian Baseball League
- Sport: Baseball
- Number of teams: 6

2024 Lithuanian Baseball League was the 38th annual edition of the Lithuanian Baseball League, organised by the Lithuanian Baseball Association. Six teams from four cities participated in the championship. Kaunas Lituanica won the League after defeating defending champions BK Vilnius in the finals 3–0.

== Teams ==
Location of teams in 2024 Lithuanian Baseball League

2024 season teams:

- Vilniaus beisbolo akademija - "Sostinės Tauras"
- Utenos "Titanai"
- Radviliškio "Bėgiai"
- Kauno "Lituanica"
- Kauno SM "Gaja"
- BK "Vilnius"

== Regular season ==
Pos	Team	Pld	W	L
1	Kauno Lituanica	16	13	3
2	BK Vilnius	16	13	3
3	Utenos Titanai	16	10	6
4	Vilniaus beisbolo akademija - "Sostinės Tauras"	16	4	12
5	Kauno Gaja	10	2	8
6	Radviliškio Bėgiai	10	0	10

== Playoffs ==
Two best teams qualified for the 2025 CEB Federation Cup Qualifiers.

Pos	Team	Pld	W	L
1	Kauno Lituanica	2	2	0
2	BK Vilnius	2	2	0
3	Utenos Titanai	2	0	2
4	Vilniaus beisbolo akademija - "Sostinės Tauras"	2	0	2

=== Finals ===
Date	Winners	Result	Losers
21 September	Kauno Lituanica	6-1	BK Vilnius
22 September	Kauno Lituanica	9-0	BK Vilnius
28 September	Kauno Lituanica	7-3	BK Vilnius
