= Vielma =

Vielma is a surname. Notable people with the surname include:

- Engelb Vielma (born 1994), Venezuelan baseball player
- Leonel Vielma (born 1978), Venezuelan footballer
