= 2020 Lithuanian Baseball League =

- League: Lithuanian Baseball League
- Sport: Baseball
- Teams: 4

2020 Lithuanian Baseball League was the 34th annual edition of the Lithuanian Baseball League, organised by the Lithuanian Baseball Association. Due to the COVID-19 pandemic in Lithuania, only four teams participated in the championships, in comparison to usual 12 teams format. The finals were played on 12-13 September 2020.

Lukas Sirgėda representing Utenos Titanai was awarded as most valuable player of the season.

== Regular season ==
2020 m. beisbolo čempionato komandos

Pos	Team	Pld	W	L
1	Utenos Titanai	15	13	2
2	Lituanica Balta	15	8	7
3	BK Vilnius	15	8	7
4	Lituanica Žalia	15	1	14

=== Regular season best players ===
Category	Player	Club	Result
Batting Average	Lukas Sirgedas	Utenos Titanai	0.531
Home Runs	Andrius Stravinskas Jr.	Lituanica Balta	3
Runs batted in	Lukas Sirgedas	Utenos Titanai	18
Earned run average	Eimantas Zickus	Utenos Titanai	0.96
Strikeouts	Eimantas Zickus	Utenos Titanai	52
Saves	William Gordon	Lituanica Balta	1

== Finals ==
=== Bronze final ===
Date	Winners	Result	Losers
12 September	BK Vilnius	6-4	Lituanica Žalia
12 September	BK Vilnius	13-1	Lituanica Žalia

=== Golden final ===
Date	Winners	Result	Losers
12 September	Utenos Titanai	13-1	Lituanica Balta
13 September	Utenos Titanai	10-3	Lituanica Balta
