= Al Luplow =

American baseball player (1939–2017)

- Outfielder
- Born: March 13, 1939; Saginaw, Michigan, U.S.
- Died: December 28, 2017 (aged 78); Saginaw, Michigan, U.S.
- Batted: Left Threw: Right

MLB debut
- September 16, 1961, for the Cleveland Indians

Last MLB appearance
- September 26, 1967, for the Pittsburgh Pirates

MLB statistics
- Batting average: .235
- Home runs: 33
- Runs batted in: 125
- Stats at Baseball Reference

Teams
- Cleveland Indians (1961–1965); New York Mets (1966–1967); Pittsburgh Pirates (1967)

Alvin David Luplow Jr. (pronounced "LOOP-low;" March 13, 1939 – December 28, 2017) was an American professional baseball outfielder. A native of Saginaw, Michigan, he played in Major League Baseball from 1961 through 1967 for the Cleveland Indians, New York Mets and Pittsburgh Pirates.

Luplow attended Michigan State University, where he played varsity football, before signing his first pro contract with Cleveland. He batted left-handed, threw right-handed, stood 5 feet 10 inches (1.78 m) tall and weighed 175 pounds (79 kg).

Appearing in 481 games over all or parts of seven Major League seasons, Luplow collected 292 hits (including 33 home runs) in 1,243 at bats. In 1962, his first full year in MLB, Luplow attained career bests in most offensive categories, including hits (88), doubles (15), homers (14), runs batted in (45), and batting (.277). Usually serving in a reserve role, Luplow was the regular right fielder for the 1964 Indians and the 1966 Mets.

He is, however, remembered for making one of the most spectacular catches in the history of Fenway Park on June 27, 1963, off the bat of Red Sox hitter Dick Williams. With the tying runs on base, in the eighth inning, Luplow raced back to the right field bullpen wall, leapt, and made a backhanded catch as he flew over the fence, and tumbled head-first into the bullpen.

Luplow died on December 28, 2017, in Saginaw, Michigan.

His great-nephew, Jordan Luplow, is an active professional baseball player in the MLB.
