= Tahnaj Thomas =

American baseball player (born 1999)

Sioux City Explorers – No. 11
- Pitcher
- Born: 16 June 1999 (age 27); Freeport, The Bahamas
- Bats: Right Throws: Right
Medals
Men's baseball
Representing Bahamas
Caribbean Cup
Silver medal – second place	2025 Bahamas	Team

Tahnaj A'kheel Thomas (born 16 June 1999) is a Bahamian professional baseball pitcher for the Sioux City Explorers of the American Association of Professional Baseball.

== Career ==
=== Cleveland Indians ===
Thomas signed with the Cleveland Indians as an international free agent in 2016. He spent his first professional season in 2017 with the Dominican Summer League Indians and Arizona League Indians, going 0–5 with a 5.63 ERA over 38 1/3 innings, and played 2018 with the Arizona League Indians where he posted a 4.58 ERA over 19 2/3 innings.

=== Pittsburgh Pirates ===
On 14 November 2018 the Indians traded Thomas, Erik González and Dante Mendoza to the Pittsburgh Pirates in exchange for Jordan Luplow and Max Moroff. Thomas spent his first season with the Pirates organization in 2019 with the Bristol Pirates and pitched to a 2–3 record with a 3.17 ERA and 59 strikeouts over 48 1/3 innings. He did not in a game in 2020 due to the cancellation of the minor league season because of the COVID-19 pandemic. Thomas spent 2021 with the Greensboro Grasshoppers. Over 16 starts, Thomas went 3–3 with a 5.19 ERA and 62 strikeouts over 60 2/3 innings.

Thomas spent the 2022 season with the Double–A Altoona Curve. In 37 appearances for the club, he recorded a 3.02 ERA with 52 strikeouts and 3 saves across 50 2/3 innings pitched. Thomas returned to Altoona in 2023, making 36 outings and posting a 4.87 ERA with 26 strikeouts and 3 saves in 44 1/3 innings of work. He elected free agency following the season on 6 November 2023.

=== Milwaukee Milkmen ===
On 26 February 2024, Thomas signed with the Milwaukee Milkmen of the American Association of Professional Baseball. He did not make an appearance for the team during the 2024 season. Thomas pitched in 28 games for Milwaukee in 2025, recording a 5.23 ERA with 34 strikeouts over 31 innings of work.

=== Sioux City Explorers ===
On 22 August 2025, Thomas and a player to be named later were traded to the Sioux City Explorers in exchange for a player to be named later.
