= Erik González =

Dominican baseball player (born 1991)

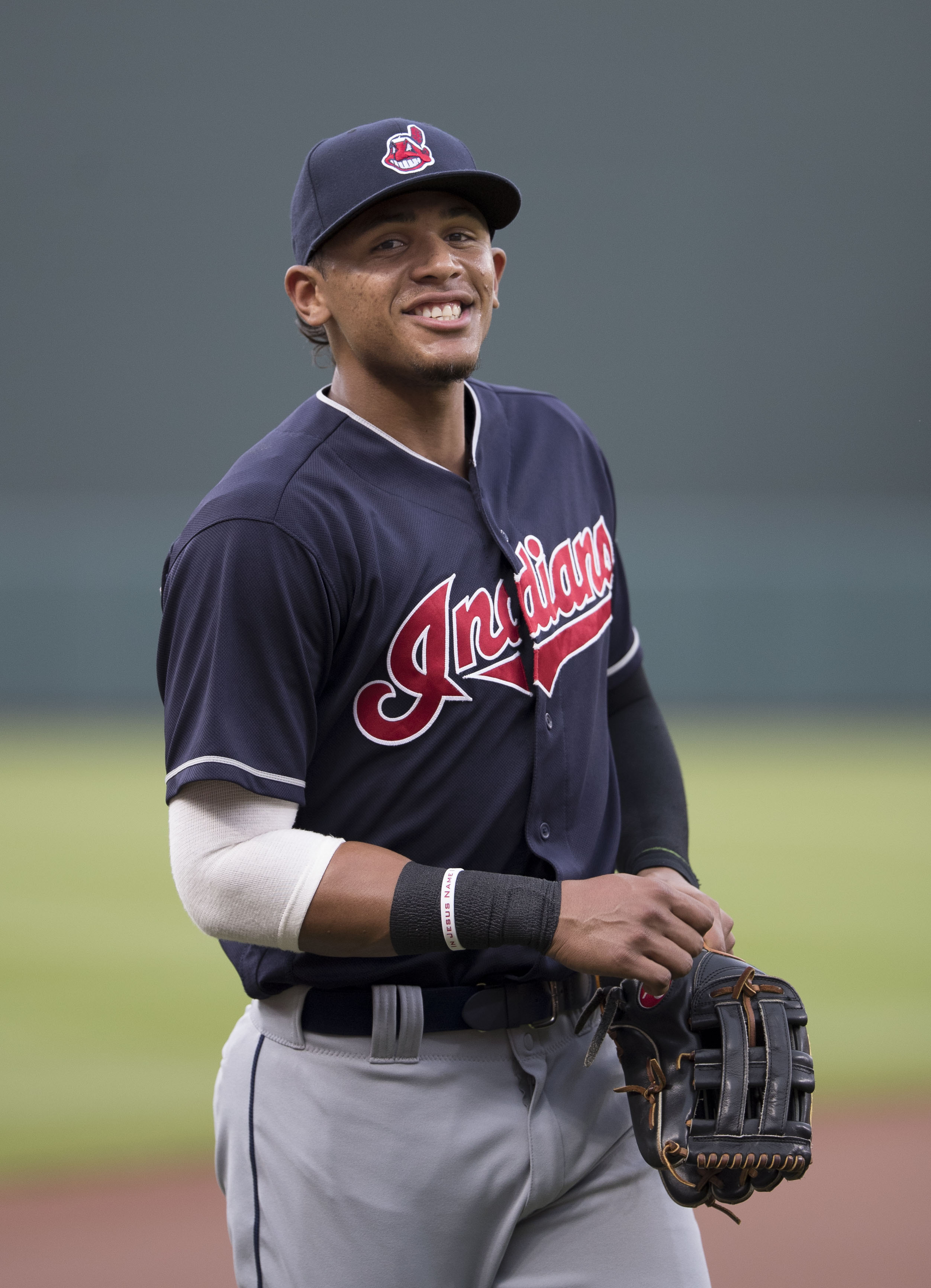
- González with the Cleveland Indians

Leones del Escogido – No. 37
- Shortstop / Third baseman
- Born: August 31, 1991 (age 35); Puerto Plata, Dominican Republic
- Bats: Right Throws: Right

MLB debut
- July 16, 2016, for the Cleveland Indians

MLB statistics (through 2022 season)
- Batting average: .242
- Home runs: 11
- Runs batted in: 77
- Stats at Baseball Reference

Teams
- Cleveland Indians (2016–2018); Pittsburgh Pirates (2019–2021); Miami Marlins (2022)

Erik González (born August 31, 1991) is a Dominican professional baseball shortstop for the Leones de Yucatán of the Mexican League. He has previously played in Major League Baseball (MLB) for the Cleveland Indians, Pittsburgh Pirates, and Miami Marlins.

== Career ==
=== Cleveland Indians ===
Originally signed by the Cleveland Indians as a free agent in 2008, he began his professional career with the rookie-level Indians squads, where he played through the 2011 season. He was promoted to the Mahoning Valley Scrappers in 2012, and finished the year with a .220 batting average in 60 games. He was then promoted to the Lake County Captains and Carolina Mudcats in 2013. After the 2013 season, MiLB.com named González the best third baseman in the Indians minor league system. He was added to the Indians' 40-man roster following the season.

In 2014, he split the season with the Mudcats and the Akron RubberDucks; with the RubberDucks he had a .357 batting average in 31 games, and was named to the Midwest League All-Star roster while with the Mudcats, hitting .289 in 74 games. In 2015, he split the season between the RubberDucks and the Columbus Clippers of the Triple–A International League. González began the 2016 season with Columbus, and appeared in the Triple-A All-Star Game. He was promoted to the major leagues on July 14, 2016. He finished the season in the major leagues with a .313 batting average in 21 games, and a .296 batting average, 11 home runs, and 12 stolen bases with the Clippers in 104 games. In 2018, González played in 81 games for the Indians as a utility infielder, averaging .265 from 136 at-bats with 1 homer and 16 runs batted in.

=== Pittsburgh Pirates ===
On November 14, 2018, González (along with minor leaguers Tahnaj Thomas and Dante Mendoza) were traded to the Pittsburgh Pirates in exchange for Max Moroff and Jordan Luplow.

In a game on April 19, 2019, González was chasing after a fly ball and collided with outfielder Starling Marte. Marte had to be carted off of the field and González suffered a fractured left clavicle, and was placed on the 60-day injured list the next day. In a shortened 2020 season due to the COVID-19 pandemic, González batted .227/.255/.359 with 3 home runs and 20 RBI in 50 games. On August 7, 2021, González was designated for assignment by the Pirates. On August 10, González cleared waivers and was outrighted to the Triple-A Indianapolis Indians. On October 13, González elected free agency.

=== Miami Marlins ===
On November 28, 2021, González signed a minor league contract with the Miami Marlins. He began the 2022 season with the Jacksonville Jumbo Shrimp and was promoted to the major leagues on May 8. In 35 plate appearances with Miami, he mustered a .194/.286/.194 batting line with 3 RBI. On May 26, González was removed from the 40-man roster and returned to Triple-A Jacksonville.

On June 26, 2022, González was selected back to the active roster and slotted in the lineup as the starting third baseman against the New York Mets. He was designated for assignment on July 1, after Billy Hamilton was added to the roster. He elected free agency on November 10.

=== Chicago White Sox ===
On December 29, 2022, González signed a minor league contract with the Chicago White Sox organization. He spent 2023 with the Triple–A Charlotte Knights, playing in 131 games and batting .272/.322/.360 with 5 home runs and 59 RBI. González elected free agency following the season on November 6.

=== Cincinnati Reds ===
On December 5, 2023, González signed a minor league contract with the Cincinnati Reds. He made 128 appearances for the Triple-A Louisville Bats, slashing .246/.287/.347 with six home runs, 55 RBI, and six stolen bases. González elected free agency following the season on November 4, 2024.

=== Leones de Yucatán ===
On November 14, 2025, González signed with the Leones de Yucatán of the Mexican League.
