= Jordan Luplow =

American baseball player (born 1993)

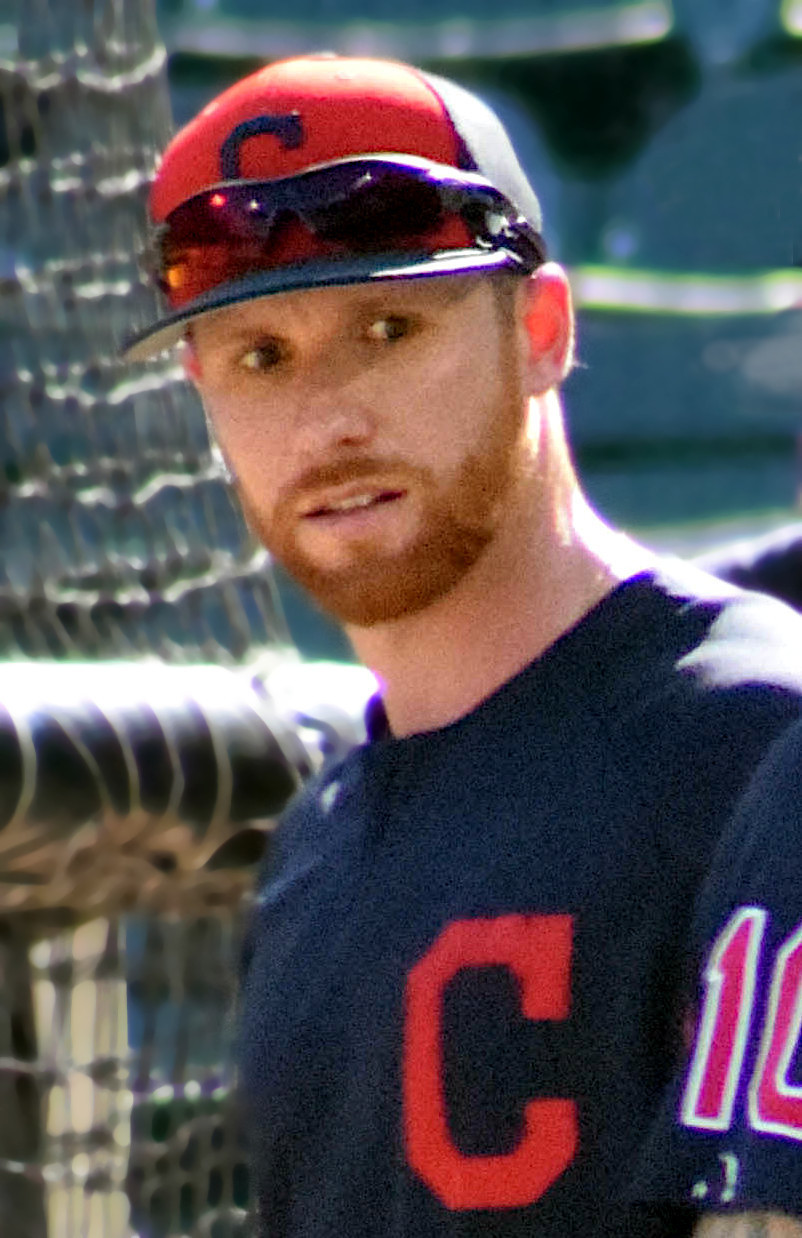
- Luplow with the Cleveland Indians in 2019

Tecolotes de los Dos Laredos – No. 47
- Outfielder
- Born: September 26, 1993 (age 32); Visalia, California, U.S.
- Bats: Right Throws: Right

MLB debut
- July 28, 2017, for the Pittsburgh Pirates

MLB statistics (through 2023 season)
- Batting average: .212
- Home runs: 47
- Runs batted in: 125
- Stats at Baseball Reference

Teams
- Pittsburgh Pirates (2017–2018); Cleveland Indians (2019–2021); Tampa Bay Rays (2021); Arizona Diamondbacks (2022); Toronto Blue Jays (2023); Minnesota Twins (2023)

Jordan Thomas Luplow (/ˈluːploʊ/ LOOP-loh; born September 26, 1993) is an American professional baseball outfielder for the Tecolotes de los Dos Laredos of the Mexican League. He has previously played in Major League Baseball (MLB) for the Pittsburgh Pirates, Cleveland Indians, Tampa Bay Rays, Arizona Diamondbacks, Toronto Blue Jays, and Minnesota Twins. He was drafted by the Pirates in the third round of the 2014 MLB draft, and made his MLB debut with them in 2017.

== Amateur career ==
Luplow attended Buchanan High School in Clovis, California, and played college baseball at Fresno State, where he was teammates with New York Yankees outfielder Aaron Judge for two seasons. Luplow was a third baseman in high school, but an injury led to Fresno State coaches converting him to an outfielder. He started all 59 games for the Bulldogs as a freshman in 2012, and was named MVP of the WAC tournament as Fresno State earned an NCAA tournament berth. Luplow appeared in 41 games as a sophomore, losing part of the season to a shoulder injury.

As a junior in 2014, he was the Mountain West Conference Player of the Year after hitting .377/.475/.609 with 9 HR and 48 RBI in 57 games as Fresno State's right fielder and primary three-hole hitter. After the season, Luplow was named to multiple All-American second and third-teams. While at Fresno State, Luplow was named to two All-Conference Academic Teams. He was also named an All-Star in both the Alaska Baseball League in 2012, and while playing for the Orleans Firebirds of the Cape Cod Baseball League in 2013.

== Professional career ==
=== Pittsburgh Pirates ===
The Pittsburgh Pirates selected Luplow in the third round of the 2014 Major League Baseball draft. He signed with the Pirates on June 17, 2014, for a signing bonus worth $500,000. Luplow made his professional debut in 2014 with Short Season Jamestown, where he hit .277 with 30 RBI in 62 games. Luplow played 2015 with the Single-A West Virginia Power, where he was asked to convert to third base, a position he hadn't played since high school. He struggled defensively with 21 errors, but he performed better offensively, hitting .264 with 64 RBI and a team high 12 HR in 106 games. Luplow spent 2016 with High-A Bradenton, where he was converted back to the outfield. In 104 games, he hit .254 with 10 HR and 54 RBI. Luplow started 2017 with Double-A Altoona, but was promoted to Triple-A Indianapolis on June 30. In 73 games with Altoona, Luplow hit .283 with 37 RBI and 16 HR, already a career-high, and was named as an Eastern League All-Star. After just 21 games with a .324 average at Triple-A, Luplow received a promotion to the major leagues, with Pirates manager Clint Hurdle describing the move as "aggressive, but it's the culmination of work we've seen at every step of the way."

On July 28, 2017, Luplow was called up by the Pittsburgh Pirates for the first time, and he made his major league debut that night against the San Diego Padres. He received the start in right field, as regular right fielder Gregory Polanco was placed on the disabled list a week prior.

On September 2, 2017, Luplow got his first career hit and career multi-run homerun, helping the Pittsburgh Pirates beat the Cincinnati Reds, 5–0.

=== Cleveland Indians ===
On November 14, 2018, Luplow and Max Moroff were traded to the Cleveland Indians in exchange for Erik González, Tahnaj Thomas and Dante Mendoza. In 85 games with the Indians in 2019, Luplow batted .276/.372/.551 with a career highs in home runs (15) and RBI (38).

Overall with the 2020 Cleveland Indians, Luplow batted .192 with two home runs and 8 RBIs in 29 games. Within a two-month span, Luplow was the final out of multiple no-hitters thrown in 2021 - the first by Carlos Rodón for the Chicago White Sox, the second by Wade Miley for the Cincinnati Reds. On June 17, 2021, Luplow was placed on the 60-day injured list with a sore left ankle.

=== Tampa Bay Rays ===
On July 30, 2021, the Indians traded Luplow and D. J. Johnson to the Tampa Bay Rays in exchange for Peyton Battenfield. He made his debut on August 6, 2021, against the Baltimore Orioles, after Randy Arozarena was placed on the COVID-19 injured list following a close contact. On October 8, 2021, he hit a grand slam in the first inning against Chris Sale of the Boston Red Sox in the ALDS at Tropicana Field.

=== Arizona Diamondbacks ===
On November 26, 2021, the Rays traded Luplow to the Arizona Diamondbacks in exchange for Ronny Simon. Luplow was designated for assignment on November 15, 2022. On November 18, he was non–tendered by the Diamondbacks and became a free agent.

=== Atlanta Braves ===
On December 19, 2022, Luplow signed a one-year, $1.4 million contract with the Atlanta Braves. Luplow was optioned to the Triple-A Gwinnett Stripers to begin the 2023 season. On April 3, 2023, Luplow was designated for assignment to clear roster space for Dylan Dodd.

=== Toronto Blue Jays ===
On April 5, 2023, Luplow was claimed off waivers by the Toronto Blue Jays and optioned to the Triple-A Buffalo Bisons. He was recalled on April 7. He got into 4 games for Toronto, going 0-for-6 with a walk, a run, and four strikeouts. On April 30, Luplow was removed from the 40-man roster and sent outright to Triple-A Buffalo. He had his contract selected back to the major league roster on July 19. In 7 more games, he went 3–for–14 with three walks and one RBI. On August 1, the Blue Jays designated Luplow for assignment.

=== Minnesota Twins ===
On August 4, 2023, Luplow was claimed off waivers by the Minnesota Twins. In 26 games for Minnesota, he batted .235/.339/.412 with 2 home runs, 4 RBI, and 2 stolen bases. On September 18, it was announced that Luplow had been designated for assignment after Michael A. Taylor was activated from the injured list. However, the DFA was rescinded and Luplow was instead optioned to the Triple–A St. Paul Saints after he consented to the demotion. Luplow was recalled to the major league roster on September 22. In 32 total games for Minnesota, he batted .206/.315/.349 with two home runs, four RBI, and two stolen bases. Following the season on October 23, Luplow was removed from the 40–man roster and sent outright to Triple–A St. Paul. However, Luplow subsequently rejected the assignment and elected free agency.

=== Philadelphia Phillies ===
On January 10, 2024, Luplow signed a minor league contract with the Braves organization. He was released on March 14 and the following day signed a minor league contract with the Philadelphia Phillies. In 62 games for the Triple–A Lehigh Valley IronPigs, he batted .255/.343/.450 with 10 home runs, 32 RBI, and 12 stolen bases. On June 24, Luplow was diagnosed with a torn ACL in his right knee and was ruled out for the remainder of the season. He elected free agency following the season on November 4.

=== High Point Rockers ===
On May 11, 2025, Luplow signed with the High Point Rockers of the Atlantic League of Professional Baseball. In 14 appearances for High Point, Luplow batted .255/.390/.574 with four home runs and 13 RBI.

=== Tecolotes de los Dos Laredos ===
On July 2, 2025, Luplow's contract was purchased by the Tecolotes de los Dos Laredos of the Mexican League. In 14 games he hit .184/.241/.204 with 0 home runs and 3 RBIs.

== Personal life ==
Luplow is the great-nephew of outfielder Al Luplow, who had a seven-year major league career with the Indians, Pirates, and New York Mets during the 1960s.
