= Lithuanian Baseball League =

Baseball League in Lithuania

- Current season, competition or edition: 2024 Lithuanian Baseball League
- Sport: Baseball
- Founded: 1988
- President: Vermidas Neverauskas
- No. of teams: 6
- Country: Lithuania
- Continent: Europe
- Most recent champion: Kaunas Lituanica (17th or 18th title)
- Most titles: Kaunas Lituanica (17 or 18 titles)

The Lithuanian Baseball Championships (Lietuvos Beisbolo Lyga, LBL) is the men's amateur league in Lithuania. Originally the first season finished in 1922 and was organized by Steponas Darius, but the second season did not occur until 1988.

== Clubs ==
2025 season teams:

- BK Vilnius
- Lituanica
- Lituanica-SM Gaja
- SM Sostines Tauras
- Titanai
- Vilties Liutai

== Lithuanian Champions ==
Lithuanian champions
Year	Team
1922	LFLS Kaunas
1988	Kaunas Auda
1989	Kaunas Auda
1990	Vilnius Žalgiris
1991	Vilnius Panerys-Deka
1992	Vilnius Panerys
1993	Vilnius Klevas
1994	Kaunas FBK
1995	Vilnius Klevas
1996	Vilnius Juodasis Vikingas
1997	Vilnius Juodasis Vikingas
1998	Kaunas FBK
1999	Vilnius Juodasis Vikingas
2000	Vilnius Juodasis Vikingas
2001	Vilnius Juodasis Vikingas
2002	Kaunas Lituanica
2003	Kaunas Lituanica
2004	Vilnius Juodasis Vikingas
2005	Kaunas Lituanica
2006	Kaunas Lituanica
2007	Kaunas Lituanica
2008	Vilnius Juodasis Vikingas
2009	Kaunas Lituanica
2010	Kaunas Lituanica
2011	Vilnius Juodasis Vikingas
2012	Kaunas Lituanica
2013	Kaunas Lituanica
2014	Vilnius Juodasis Vikingas - Sporto Vilkai
2015	Kaunas Lituanica
2016	Kaunas Lituanica
2017	BC Minsk
2018	BC Minsk
2019	BC Minsk
2020	Utena Titanai
2021	BK Vilnius
2022	BK Vilnius
2023	BK Vilnius
2024	Kaunas Lituanica
2025	Kaunas Lituanica
