= Justin Meccage =

American baseball coach (born 1980)

San Francisco Giants – No. 84
- Coach
- Born: February 10, 1980 (age 46); Billings, Montana, U.S.
- Bats: Right Throws: Right
- Stats at Baseball Reference

Teams
- As coach: Pittsburgh Pirates (2018–2024); San Francisco Giants (2026–present)

Justin Robert Meccage (\MESS-ij\) (born February 10, 1980) is an American professional baseball coach for the San Francisco Giants of Major League Baseball (MLB).

== Career ==
Meccage attended Oklahoma State University, and played college baseball for the Oklahoma State Cowboys. The New York Yankees selected him in the 32nd round of the 2002 MLB draft, and he played for the Staten Island Yankees and Cook County Cheetahs in 2002 and 2003 before shifting into coaching. He served as an assistant coach, recruiting coordinator and pitching coach for the University of Texas–Pan American from 2004 to 2007. He then served as the pitching coach for Arkansas State University from 2007 through 2010. He joined the Pittsburgh Pirates organization in 2011 and served as a pitching coach at various levels through 2016. He served as the Pirates Minor League Pitching Coordinator in 2017.

In 2018, the Pirates elevated Meccage to their major league coaching staff as the assistant pitching coach. Meccage was made the Pirates' bullpen coach prior to the 2020 season, and was fired from that position following the conclusion of the 2024 season.

On February 5, 2025, the Milwaukee Brewers hired Meccage to serve as a pitching coach for their Triple-A affiliate, the Nashville Sounds.

On November 18, 2025, the San Francisco Giants named Meccage as their Major League pitching coach.

== Personal life ==
Meccage's father Bob, who was a college pitching coach, died during Justin's senior year of college. His brother Jeremy is also a college pitching coach. Meccage and his wife Stacee have three sons.
