= Edgar Santana =

Dominican baseball player (born 1991)

Pericos de Puebla – No. 51
- Pitcher
- Born: October 16, 1991 (age 34); Puerto Plata, Dominican Republic
- Bats: Right Throws: Right

MLB debut
- June 10, 2017, for the Pittsburgh Pirates

MLB statistics (through 2021 season)
- Win–loss record: 6–4
- Earned run average: 3.40
- Strikeouts: 107
- Stats at Baseball Reference

Teams
- Pittsburgh Pirates (2017–2018); Atlanta Braves (2021)

Edgar Santana Familia (born October 16, 1991) is a Dominican professional baseball pitcher for the Pericos de Puebla of the Mexican League. He has previously played in Major League Baseball (MLB) for the Pittsburgh Pirates and Atlanta Braves.

== Career ==
=== Pittsburgh Pirates ===
Santana signed with the Pittsburgh Pirates as an international free agent in October 2013. He made his professional debut in 2014 with the Dominican Summer League Pirates and spent the whole season there, going 1–3 with a 3.66 ERA in 19.2 relief innings pitched. He played 2015 with the West Virginia Black Bears and West Virginia Power where he posted a combined 1–0 record and 3.19 ERA in 22 relief appearances. In 2016 he pitched for the Bradenton Marauders, Altoona Curve and Indianapolis Indians, compiling a combined 4–1 record and 2.71 ERA in 43 appearances out of the bullpen, and after the season pitched in the Arizona Fall League.

Santana started 2017 with the Indianapolis Indians, and was called up to the Pirates on June 10. He made his MLB debut that day against the Miami Marlins, in which he pitched an inning, allowing one run on three hits and striking out two. He was recalled and optioned multiple times during the season. In 44 games for Indianapolis he was 1–3 with a 2.79 ERA, and in 19 games for the Pirates he compiled a 3.50 ERA. Santana began 2018 in Pittsburgh's bullpen, and pitched to a 3.26 ERA with 54 strikeouts in 66.1 innings of work.

Santana underwent Tommy John surgery in October 2018 after suffering a torn UCL, and missed the entire 2019 season. On June 28, 2020, Santana was suspended 80 games for testing positive for Boldenone, and missed the entire 2020 season. On April 5, 2021, Santana was designated for assignment following the waiver claim of Kyle Keller.

=== Atlanta Braves ===
On April 9, 2021, Santana was traded to the Atlanta Braves in exchange for cash considerations. On April 30, Santana made his first MLB appearance since the 2018 season, allowing 1 run in 1.0 inning. In 41 total games for Atlanta, he recorded a 3.59 ERA with 33 strikeouts across 42 2/3 innings pitched. On October 27, Santana was released by the Braves.

=== Pericos de Puebla ===
On March 4, 2024, Santana signed with the Pericos de Puebla of the Mexican League.
