= Dovydas Neverauskas =

Lithuanian baseball player (born 1993)

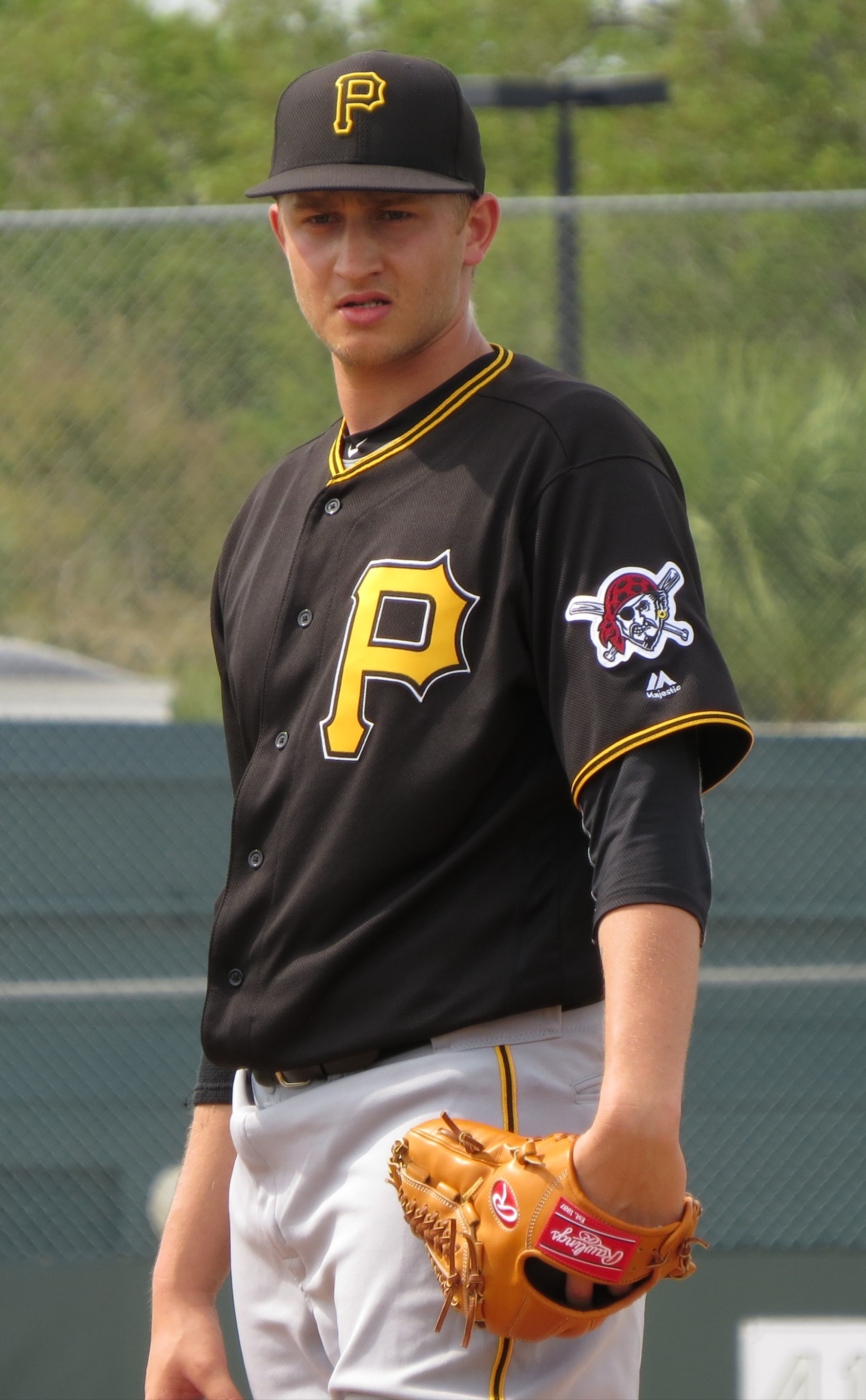
- Neverauskas pitching in 2016 Pittsburgh Pirates spring training

Free agent
- Pitcher
- Born: January 14, 1993 (age 33); Vilnius, Lithuania
- Bats: Right Throws: Right

Professional debut
- MLB: April 24, 2017, for the Pittsburgh Pirates
- NPB: May 30, 2021, for the Hiroshima Toyo Carp

MLB statistics (through 2020 season)
- Win–loss record: 1–4
- Earned run average: 6.89
- Strikeouts: 76

NPB statistics (through 2021 season)
- Win–loss record: 0–1
- Earned run average: 10.13
- Strikeouts: 2
- Stats at Baseball Reference

Teams
- Pittsburgh Pirates (2017–2020); Hiroshima Toyo Carp (2021)

Dovydas Neverauskas (born January 14, 1993) is a Lithuanian professional baseball player who is a pitcher and is a free agent. He has previously played in Major League Baseball (MLB) for the Pittsburgh Pirates, and in Nippon Professional Baseball (NPB) for the Hiroshima Toyo Carp. He was the first player from Lithuania in MLB, NPB, and LMB history.

== Career ==
=== Amateur ===
Neverauskas's father, who coaches youth baseball and national teams and promotes the sport in Lithuania, encouraged him to play baseball, despite it not being well known in the country. Neverauskas said there were no baseball fields in the country. He attended training camps in Italy to better learn the game. He attended his first MLB game in 2006 on a trip with his father. He attended MLB's European Baseball Academy in 2008 and 2009.

=== Pittsburgh Pirates ===
Neverauskas signed with the Pirates as a free agent in 2009. He was converted into a relief pitcher in 2015. He began the 2016 season with the Altoona Curve of the Double-A Eastern League and was promoted to the Indianapolis Indians of the Triple-A International League in June. He pitched a scoreless inning in the 2016 All-Star Futures Game. The Pirates added him to their 40-man roster after the season.

On April 24, 2017, Neverauskas made his Major League Baseball debut for the Pittsburgh Pirates against the Chicago Cubs. He pitched two innings, allowed one run, and had one strikeout. Neverauskas picked up his first Major League win on August 6, 2017, when the Pirates defeated the San Diego Padres in 11 innings. He pitched two scoreless innings, giving up two hits and striking out three. He finished the season for the Pirates pitching in 25 1/3 innings with a 3.91 ERA. The following season, he pitched the majority of the season at Triple-A, registering an ERA of 8 for the Pirates in 25 games. He split 2019 between the majors and minors, with a 10.61 ERA in 10 games for Pittsburgh.

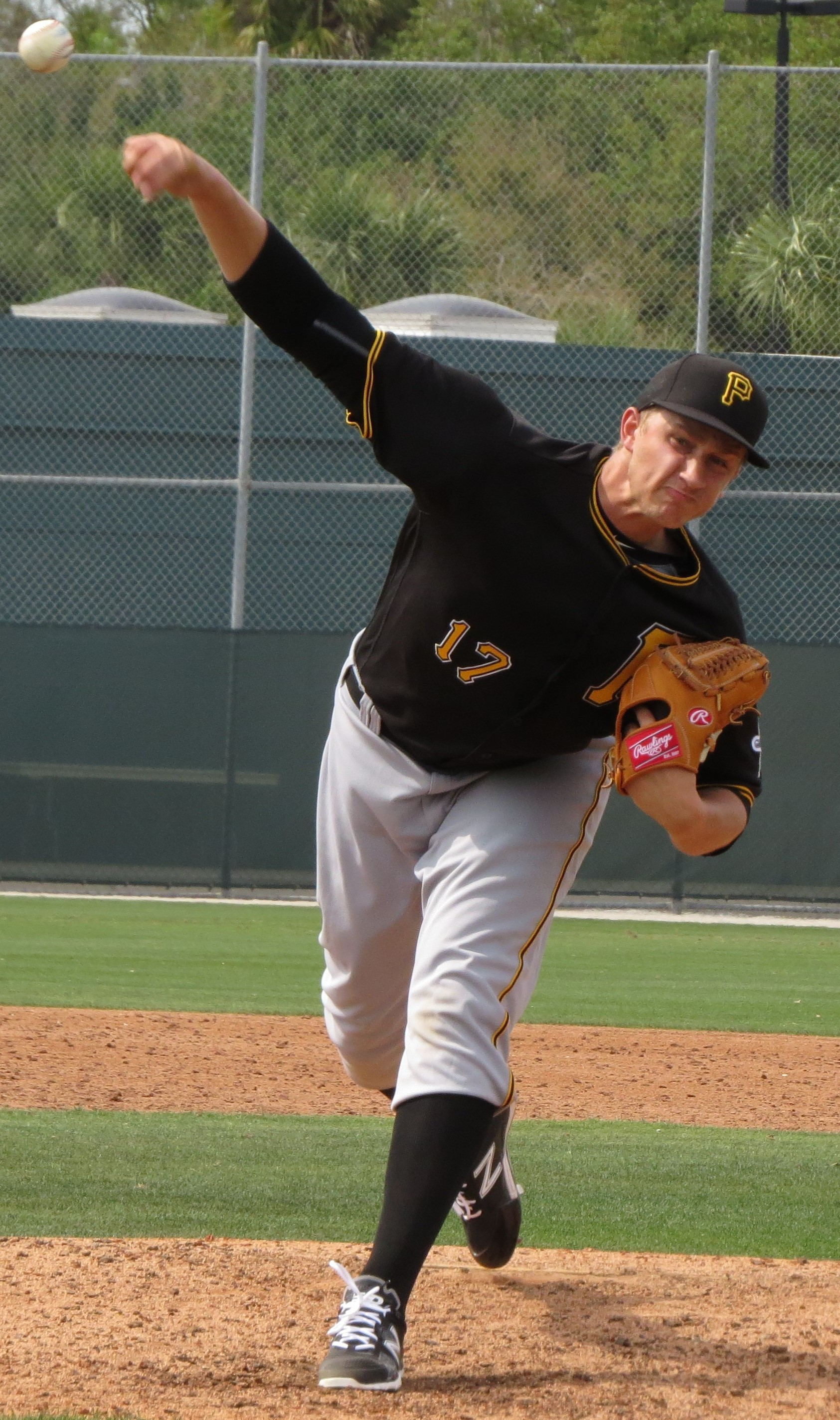
Neverauskas in spring training in 2016

Neverauskas had a 7.11 ERA in 17 games for with the Pirates in 2020, his lowest ERA in the majors since 2017. He was designated for assignment by the Pirates on November 1, 2020 and released on November 3.

=== Hiroshima Toyo Carp ===
On November 16, 2020, Neverauskas signed a one-year, $875,000 contract with the Hiroshima Toyo Carp of Nippon Professional Baseball (NPB). He was the first Lithuanian-born player to play in NPB, making his debut and only NPB appearance on May 30, 2021, taking the loss against the Chiba Lotte Marines. He also pitched 14 games in the minor-league Western League, with a 5.35 ERA. Neverauskas left Japan on October 6, and Hiroshima released him after the season.

=== Bonn Capitals ===
On March 23, 2022, Neverauskas signed with the Bonn Capitals of the German Baseball-Bundesliga. The first inning he pitched in the Bundesliga was an immaculate inning. He won the national championship with the team, being the closer in the last game of the finals series against the Paderborn Untouchables.

=== Spire City Ghost Hounds ===
On February 27, 2023, Neverauskas signed with the Spire City Ghost Hounds of the Atlantic League of Professional Baseball (ALPB). In 26 games, Neverauskas logged a 5.02 ERA with 28 strikeouts and 9 saves across 28 2/3 innings of work.

=== Charros de Jalisco ===
On November 2, 2023, Neverauskas was drafted by the Long Island Ducks in the Ghost Hounds dispersal draft. On February 23, 2024, prior to the start of the ALPB season, Neverauskas signed with the Charros de Jalisco of the Mexican Baseball League (LMB), making him the first Lithuanian player in the league. In 34 appearances for Jalisco, he compiled a 1–3 record and 5.81 ERA with 17 strikeouts across 31 innings pitched. Neverauskas was released by the Charros on April 3, 2025. However, he returned to Jalisco on May 17. In 13 games (11 starts) he threw 48 1/3 innings, going 2–2 with a 5.96 ERA with more walks (27) than strikeouts (24). On February 17, 2026, Neverauskas was released by the Charros.

=== Lithuania ===
Neverauskas pitched and played first base for the Lithuania national team in the 2025 European Baseball Championship. He had a 3.86 ERA in two games pitching and batted 2-for-5 with a double as the team lost all four of its games. He also pitched for BK Vilnius in the Lithuania Baseball Association in 2024 and 2025.
