= Max Moroff =

American baseball player (born 1993)

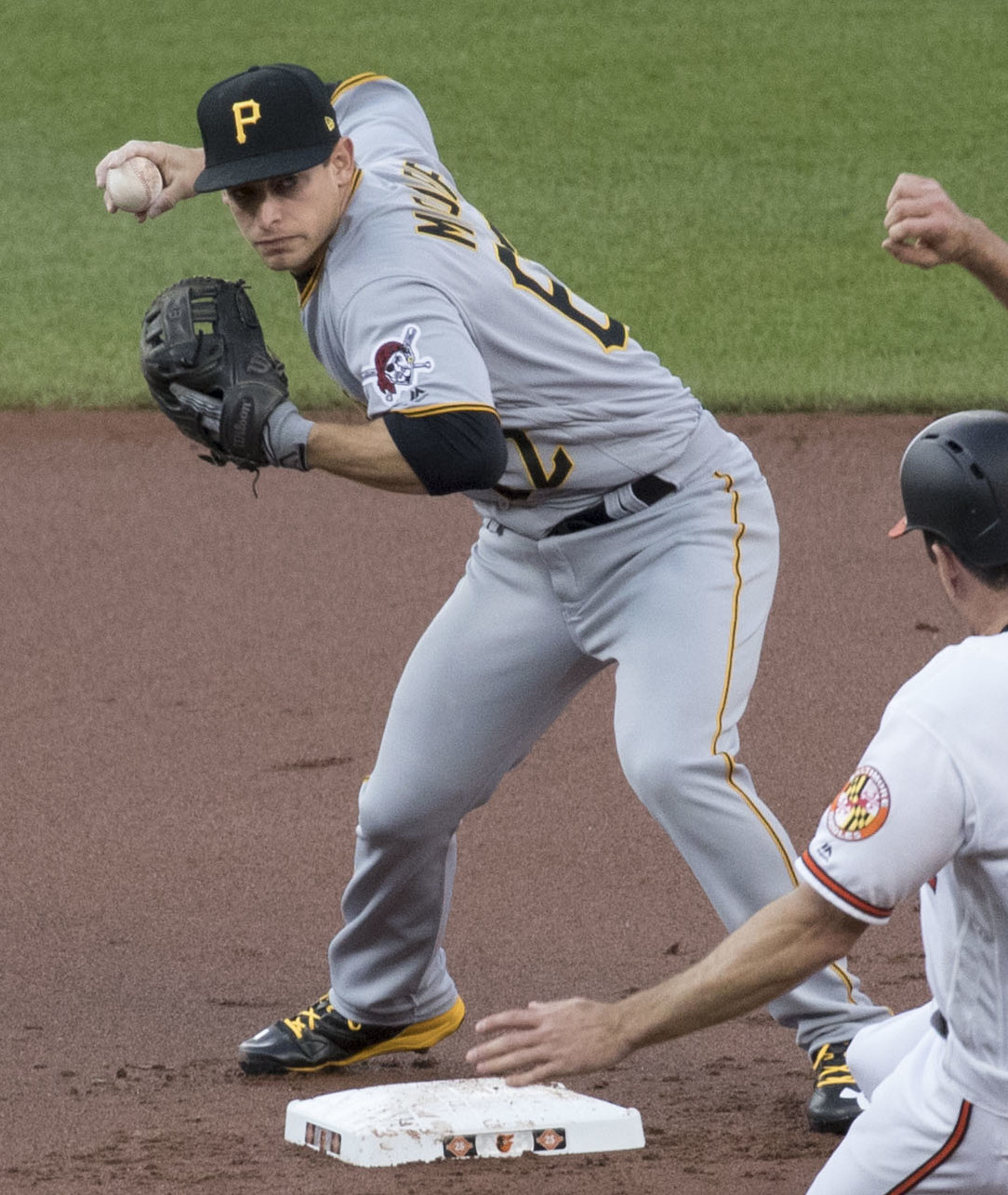
- Moroff with the Pittsburgh Pirates in 2017
- Infielder
- Born: May 13, 1993 (age 32); Winter Park, Florida, U.S.
- Batted: Switch Threw: Right

MLB debut
- July 31, 2016, for the Pittsburgh Pirates

Last MLB appearance
- May 26, 2021, for the St. Louis Cardinals

MLB statistics
- Batting average: .175
- Home runs: 7
- Run batted in: 35
- Stats at Baseball Reference

Teams
- Pittsburgh Pirates (2016–2018); Cleveland Indians (2019); St. Louis Cardinals (2021)

Maxwell Anthony Moroff (born May 13, 1993) is an American former professional baseball infielder. He played in Major League Baseball (MLB) for the Pittsburgh Pirates, Cleveland Indians, and St. Louis Cardinals.

== Career ==
Moroff was a member of the Maitland Little League team that represented Maitland, Florida and the Southeast region at the 2005 Little League World Series. He was teammates with Dante Bichette Jr., and the team's two assistant coaches were former MLB players Mike Stanley and Dante Bichette. He attended Trinity Preparatory School in Winter Park, Florida.

=== Pittsburgh Pirates ===
Moroff was drafted by the Pittsburgh Pirates in the 16th round of the 2012 Major League Baseball draft. He signed on the last day of the trade deadline for $300,000 which equated to a 4th round slot bonus. On July 24, 2012, Moroff made his professional debut with the Gulf Coast Pirates as the shortstop and leadoff hitter. He had a single, three walks and a stolen base. He has progressed a level every season, spending 2013 with the West Virginia Power and 2014 with the Bradenton Marauders.

Moroff was assigned to the Double-A Altoona Curve to begin the 2015 season. Moroff was named player of the week by the Eastern League for the week of April 20–26, batting .474 with four doubles, one triple, one homer, four RBI and two runs scored in 5 games. Moroff was then named to the Eastern League Mid-Season All-Star team where he started as the second baseman for the Western division. Towards the end of the season, Moroff was selected as a 2015 Eastern League All-Star. He finished the season breaking an Altoona Curve franchise record with 153 hits as a switch hitter, which was last set in 2002 at 142 hits. On September 11, Moroff was named by Baseball America to one of the Minor League Classification All-Star Teams, where he was selected as the AA second baseman out of the Eastern League, Texas League, and Southern League. On September 15, Moroff was named as the Pittsburgh Pirates Minor League Player of the Year, after batting .293 with 28 doubles, six triples, seven home runs, 51 RBI, 17 stolen bases, 79 runs scored and a .322 on-base percentage. He also led the Eastern League in runs scored (79) and games played (136) while also ranking second in hits (153), third in walks (70) and fourth in total bases (214). In the field, Moroff led all Eastern League second basemen in fielding percentage (.978), double plays (76) and assists (330). The Pirates added him to their 40-man roster after the season.

=== Cleveland Indians ===
On November 14, 2018, the Pirates traded Moroff and Jordan Luplow to the Cleveland Indians in exchange for Erik González, Tahnaj Thomas, and Dante Mendoza. In 20 games for the Indians, he hit .125/.176/.250 with one home run, four RBI, and one stolen base. Moroff was designated for assignment on May 5, 2019, and was subsequently outrighted to the minor leagues after clearing waivers on May 11. Moroff elected free agency following the season on November 4.

=== New York Mets ===
On December 5, 2019, Moroff signed a minor league contract with the New York Mets organization. He did not play in a game in 2020 due to the cancellation of the minor league season because of the COVID-19 pandemic. Moroff became a free agent on November 2, 2020.

=== St. Louis Cardinals ===
On December 15, 2020, Moroff signed a minor league contract with the St. Louis Cardinals organization and was invited to Spring Training. On May 14, 2021, Moroff was selected to the active roster. On June 6, it was announced that Moroff would require season-ending surgery on his left shoulder after previously suffering a shoulder subluxation. In six games for St. Louis, he batted 1-for-16 (.063) with one RBI. He was placed on the 60-day injured list on June 17. On November 5, 2021, Moroff was outrighted off of the 40-man roster. He elected free agency two days later.
