= Lithuanian Baseball Association =

Lithuanian national sports governing body

Lithuanian Baseball Association Lietuvos beisbolo asociacija
- Sport: Baseball
- Jurisdiction: Lithuania
- Abbreviation: LBA
- Founded: 1987
- Affiliation: WBSC
- Affiliation date: 1991
- Regional affiliation: WBSC Europe
- Affiliation date: 1991
- Headquarters: Vilnius, Lithuania
- President: Vermidas Neverauskas

Official website
- www.beisbolas.lt
- (Lithuania)

The Lithuanian Baseball Association (Lithuanian: Lietuvos beisbolo asociacija) is the national governing body of baseball in Lithuania. The association was established in 1987 and joined the International Baseball Federation and the Confederation of European Baseball (today WBSC Europe) in 1991.

The Lithuanian Baseball Association is responsible for the national baseball team, the coed national Baseball5 team and overseeing the Lithuanian Baseball League.

== History ==
Baseball was introduced in Lithuania by Lithuanian American pilot Steponas Darius in 1922, after returning from the United States. The first season of the Lithuanian Baseball League took place that same year and LFLS Kaunas were crowned champions. The second season of the league did not happen until 1988.

Lithuania's baseball team has never qualified for any major tournament. Whereas the national Baseball5 team is the current European runner-up after losing the inaugural Baseball5 European Championship against France.

In 2017, Dovydas Neverauskas became the first Lithuanian to play in the Major League Baseball, doing so with the Pittsburgh Pirates.

Lithuania Baseball Association's current president is Vermidas Neverauskas, Dovydas Neverauskas father.

== National teams ==
Team	Manager
Baseball	(United States) William Gordon
Baseball5	(Lithuania) Eimantas Zickus
