= Steven Brault =

American baseball player (born 1992)

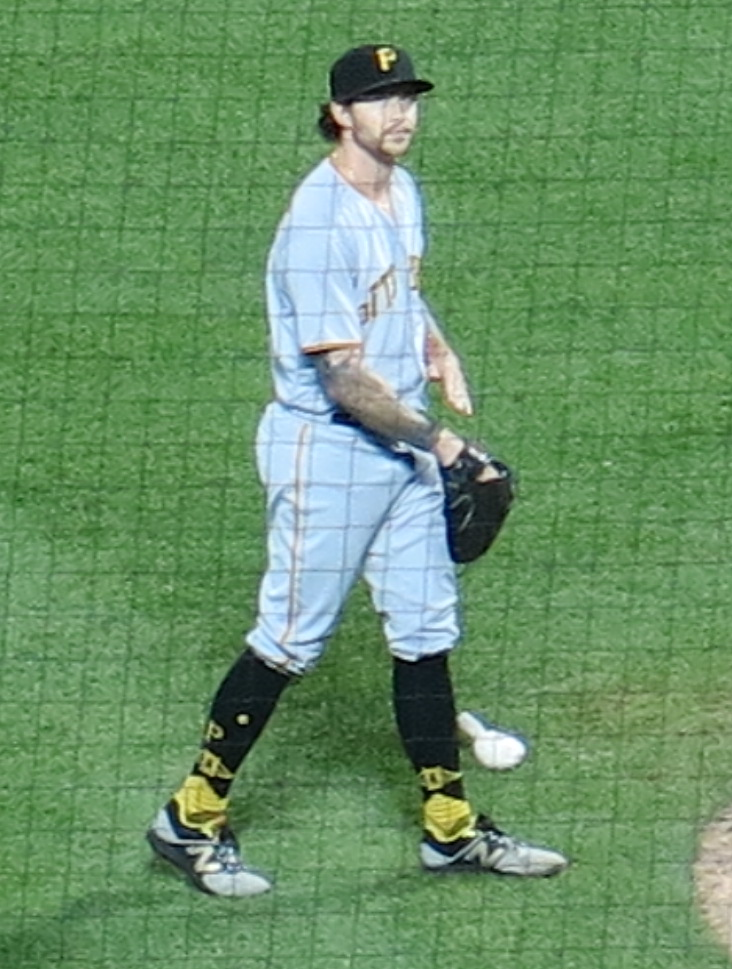
- Brault with the Pirates in 2018
- Pitcher
- Born: April 29, 1992 (age 34); La Mesa, California, U.S.
- Batted: Left Threw: Left

MLB debut
- July 5, 2016, for the Pittsburgh Pirates

Last MLB appearance
- August 23, 2022, for the Chicago Cubs

MLB statistics
- Win–loss record: 12–18
- Earned run average: 4.73
- Strikeouts: 299
- Stats at Baseball Reference

Teams
- Pittsburgh Pirates (2016–2021); Chicago Cubs (2022)

Steven Joseph Brault (born April 29, 1992) is an American MLB broadcaster for the Pittsburgh Pirates and a former professional baseball pitcher and outfielder. He played in Major League Baseball for the Pirates and the Chicago Cubs.

== Amateur career ==
Brault grew up as a fan of the San Diego Padres. He graduated from Grossmont High School in El Cajon, California. As a senior at Grossmont, he compiled an 8–1 record with a 2.56 ERA along with batting .378, playing alongside future Pittsburgh Pirates teammate Joe Musgrove. He was undrafted out of high school.

Brault played college baseball at Regis University, where he majored in vocal performance. As a junior, he started 11 games and was 8–3 with a 2.63 ERA, striking out 103 and walking only 18 in 78.2 innings.

== Professional career ==
=== Baltimore Orioles ===
The Baltimore Orioles selected Brault in the 11th round of the 2013 Major League Baseball draft. He signed with the Orioles, and made his professional debut with the Aberdeen IronBirds and spent the remainder of 2013 there, going 1–2 with a 2.09 ERA in 12 starts. He spent 2014 with the Delmarva Shorebirds and Frederick Keys, compiling a combined 11–8 record and 2.77 ERA in 25 games (24 starts).

=== Pittsburgh Pirates ===
Brault's delivery

Brault was sent from the Orioles to the Pittsburgh Pirates as the player to be named later on February 20, 2015, completing a trade from the previous month on January 27 in which Travis Snider was sent to Baltimore in exchange for Stephen Tarpley. He started his Pirates career with the Bradenton Marauders and was later promoted to the Altoona Curve. In 28 starts between both clubs, Brault pitched to a 13–4 record, a 2.43 ERA, and a 1.12 WHIP. He began 2016 with the Indianapolis Indians.

The Pirates promoted Brault to the major leagues to make his debut on July 5, 2016, at Busch Stadium against the St. Louis Cardinals. He pitched four innings in which he gave up two runs (one earned) while walking two and striking out five as Pittsburgh defeated St. Louis 5–2. He was optioned back to Indianapolis the next day. Brault was recalled and optioned multiple times during the season, with his final call-up of the year being September 2. In 16 games (15 starts), he was 2–7 with a 3.91 ERA, and in eight games (seven starts) for Pittsburgh, he was 0–3 with a 4.86 ERA. Brault began 2017 with Indianapolis. He was recalled twice before he was called up for the remainder of the season on August 22. In 21 starts for the Indians, he pitched to a 10–5 record and 1.94 ERA, and in 11 games (four starts) for the Pirates, he was 1–0 with a 4.67 ERA.

Brault began 2018 in Pittsburgh's bullpen but was moved into the starting rotation because of an injury to Joe Musgrove. However, after compiling a 5.54 ERA through five starts, he was moved into the bullpen. He ended the season with an ERA of 4.61 in 45 games (5 starts). He struck out 82 in 91 2/3 innings.

In 2019, Brault pitched in 25 games, 19 of which he started, and recorded a 5.16 ERA with a 4–6 record. Offensively, he tied with Zack Greinke for the major league lead in hits by a pitcher with 14. In 2020 for the Pirates, Brault pitched to a 3.38 ERA with 38 strikeouts in 42.2 innings pitched.

On April 1, 2021, Brault was placed on the 60-day injured list with a left lat strain. He made his 2021 Pirates debut as the starter against Milwaukee on August 4. The Pirates designated Brault for assignment on November 29, 2021.

=== Chicago Cubs ===
On March 16, 2022, Brault agreed to a major league contract with the Chicago Cubs. However, on March 21, Brault's deal was converted to a minor league contract due to Brault suffering an injury setback. The minor league deal contained an invitation to Spring Training and a July opt-out clause. In 7 games for the Triple-A Iowa Cubs, Brault struggled to a 12.00 ERA with 6 strikeouts in 6.0 innings pitched.

On July 16, 2022, Brault was selected to the active roster. He made 9 appearances for the Cubs, posting a 3.00 ERA with 8 strikeouts in 9.0 innings pitched. On August 24, Brault was placed on the injured list with a left shoulder strain, an injury that would ultimately shelve him for the remainder of the season.

On November 10, 2022, Brault was removed from the 40-man roster and sent outright to Triple-A. He elected minor league free agency the same day.

=== Spire City Ghost Hounds ===
On April 21, 2023, Brault signed with the Spire City Ghost Hounds of the Atlantic League of Professional Baseball. It was later announced that Brault would convert into a position player on a full-time basis. In 58 games for Spire City, he batted .283/.327/.465 with 7 home runs, 27 RBI, and 4 stolen bases. On September 9, Brault retired from professional baseball.

== Music career ==
At Regis University, Brault majored in music performance with a vocal performance emphasis. On June 19, 2018, Brault sang "The Star-Spangled Banner" at PNC Park before the Pirates' game against the Milwaukee Brewers. On September 8, 2019, he repeated his National Anthem performance prior to a Pirates game against the St. Louis Cardinals. He had sung the National Anthem before games in the minor leagues, and also participated in theater and choir programs in his childhood.

In November 2019, Brault recorded an album entitled A Pitch At Broadway, which was released in 2020. On it, he sings covers of songs from noted Broadway musicals, including selections from Hamilton, Wicked, The Phantom of the Opera, and Rent. Brault performed lead vocals on the 12-song album. He was accompanied on the album by drummers Vinnie Colaiuta and Kenny Aronoff, bassist Leland Sklar, guitarist Tim Pierce and keyboardist Jeff Babko. Adam Pascal and fellow Pirates player Josh Bell were special guests on the album. The album was produced by Latin GRAMMY-nominated producer, Loren Harriet, who also produced former New York Yankees outfielder Bernie Williams' two albums.

In association with his album release, Brault appeared as a special guest vocalist with the Pittsburgh Symphony Orchestra for three concerts from February 7 to 9, 2020.

Brault performed the National Anthem at the 2024 "Turnpike Series" between the Pittsburgh Pirates and Philadelphia Phillies on July 20, 2024.

== Broadcasting career ==
On August 9, 2024, Brault made his play-by-play debut on Pittsburgh SportsNet, filling in for long-time Pirates' announcer, Greg Brown, who was unavailable due to his son's wedding.

== Personal life ==
In the baseball off-season, Brault resides in San Diego, California. In 2018, he launched a podcast with fellow pitcher Trevor Williams called IMHO, in which they and a guest, usually connected with baseball, rank items relating to a topic outside of baseball.
