= Clint Hurdle =

American baseball player and manager (born 1957)

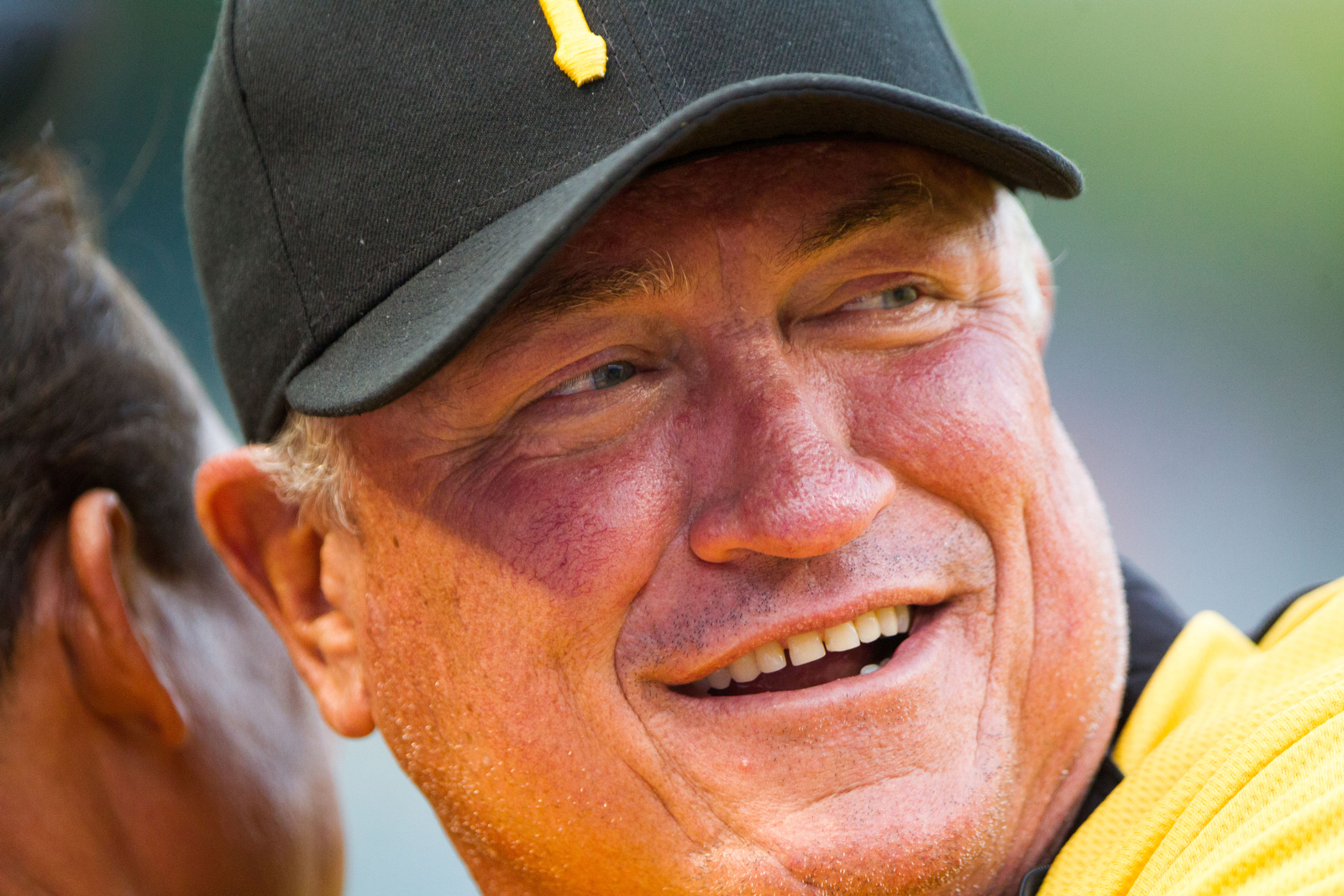
- Hurdle in 2012
- Outfielder / Manager / Coach
- Born: July 30, 1957 (age 69); Big Rapids, Michigan, U.S.
- Batted: Left Threw: Right

MLB debut
- September 18, 1977, for the Kansas City Royals

Last MLB appearance
- June 26, 1987, for the New York Mets

MLB statistics
- Batting average: .259
- Home runs: 32
- Runs batted in: 193
- Managerial record: 1,269–1,345–1
- Winning %: .485
- Stats at Baseball Reference
- Managerial record at Baseball Reference

Teams
- As player: Kansas City Royals (1977–1981); Cincinnati Reds (1982); New York Mets (1983, 1985); St. Louis Cardinals (1986); New York Mets (1987); As manager: Colorado Rockies (2002–2009); Pittsburgh Pirates (2011–2019); As coach: Colorado Rockies (1997–2002); Texas Rangers (2010); Colorado Rockies (2025)

Career highlights and awards
- NL Manager of the Year (2013)

Clinton Merrick Hurdle (born July 30, 1957) is an American former professional baseball outfielder and manager. Hurdle played for the Kansas City Royals, Cincinnati Reds, New York Mets, and St. Louis Cardinals, and previously managed the Rockies and the Pittsburgh Pirates.

Labeled a "phenom" by Sports Illustrated at age twenty, Hurdle played 515 games at the major league level. After retiring from playing baseball, Hurdle became a manager. His eight seasons with the Rockies included leading the 2007 club to the franchise's first National League (NL) pennant. On November 14, 2010, the Pirates hired him to be their manager. In 2013, Hurdle led them to their first winning season and playoff appearance since 1992. He was named the NL Manager of the Year that season. He managed the Pirates to two additional playoff appearances in 2014 and 2015 before subsequent struggles led to his dismissal after the 2019 season.

== Early life ==
Clint Hurdle is named for his father, Clinton, who played collegiate baseball for Ferris State University. When Hurdle was four years old, the family moved from Michigan to Florida so his father could take a job at the Kennedy Space Center. As a child, Hurdle was a bat boy for the Cocoa Astros of the Florida State League. Hurdle graduated from Merritt Island High School in Merritt Island, Florida. He received a scholarship from the University of Miami to play college baseball and college football as a quarterback, and was accepted to Harvard University as well, but declined both to play professional baseball instead.

== Playing career ==
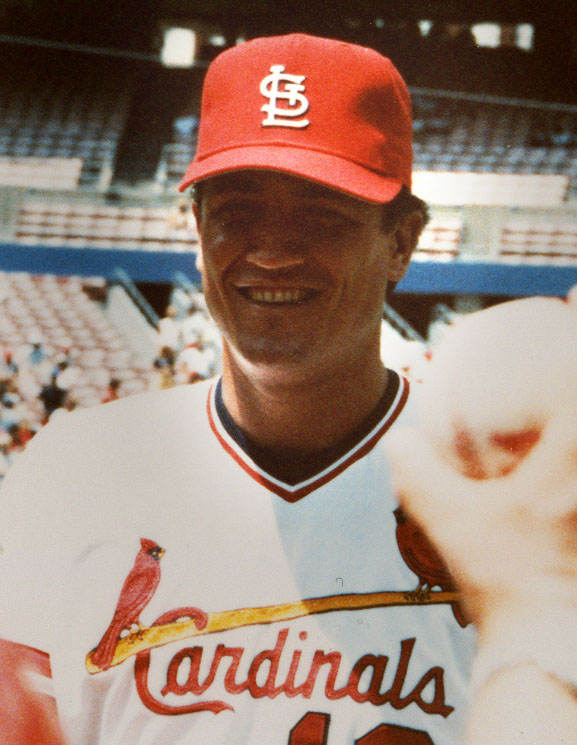
With the Cardinals in 1986

The Kansas City Royals selected Hurdle in the first round, with the ninth overall selection, of the 1975 Major League Baseball draft. He signed with the Royals, receiving a $50,000 signing bonus. He made his major league debut with the Royals in 1977, and in 1978 was featured on the cover of Sports Illustrated on March 20 with the headline: "This Year's Phenom."

Hurdle played for the Royals through 1981, but never achieved the level of play suggested by his high draft position. Hurdle had his best year in 1980 starting 109 regular season games in right field for the American League pennant winning Royals. Hurdle also started at right field in 4 games during the 1980 World Series against the Philadelphia Phillies. He was traded to the Cincinnati Reds in December 1981, and after spending 1982 with the Reds, went on waivers. In February 1983 he was signed by the Seattle Mariners before being released. In April 1983 he was signed by the New York Mets where he spent the majority of the season with their Triple-A affiliate Tidewater Tides. During the 1983 season, Hurdle set a franchise record for the Tides with 105 runs batted in. He also played in 13 games with the Mets. In 1984 he again played for the Tidewater Tides. In 1985 he played in 43 games for the Mets and in 1986 he played in 78 games for the St. Louis Cardinals. Hurdle ended his baseball career in 1987 at the age of 29 by playing in 97 games for the Tidewater Tides and 3 games for the Mets. In addition to right field, during his career he also played first base, third base, catcher, and designated hitter.

Hurdle also played three different seasons of winter ball for Tiburones de La Guaira of the Venezuelan Professional Baseball League. In his first season, 1977–78, he led the league in home runs (18) while batting .305 with 52 RBIs. He played again in 1979-80 and 1983-84. He led the Venezuelan league in walks all three seasons he played there.

== Managerial career ==
=== Early career ===
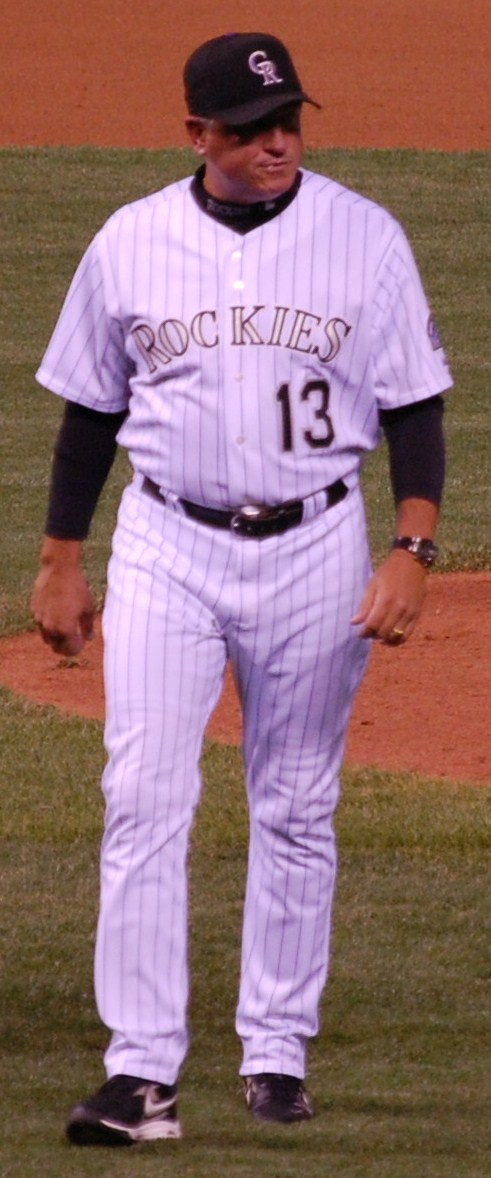
With the Rockies in 2007

After ending his playing career in 1987, Hurdle began his managerial career the next year when he was named Manager of the St. Lucie Mets of the High-A Florida State League in 1988. He also served as Manager for the Jackson Mets of the Double-A Texas League (1990), Williamsport Bills of the Double-A Eastern League (1991), and the Tidewater/Norfolk Tides of the Triple-A International League (1992–1993).

=== Colorado Rockies ===
In 1994 he joined the Colorado Rockies organization as the minor league hitting instructor, serving in that capacity until he was named the Rockies hitting coach in 1997. Hurdle was promoted to Manager in 2002 following the early-season firing of Buddy Bell. On April 2, 2006, he was given a two-year contract extension. In 2007, Hurdle managed Colorado to a record of 90-73, their best finish in the team's 15-year history; they won 13 of their last 14 games in order to force a tie-breaker game with the San Diego Padres to determine the winner of the National League Wild Card. Colorado defeated San Diego, reaching the playoffs for only the second time in Rockies history. Hurdle's Rockies then beat the Philadelphia Phillies in the Division Series, sweeping them in three games to force a match-up with their rival Arizona Diamondbacks in the NLCS. The Rockies continued their improbable streak by sweeping Arizona in four games to win the first pennant in team history and reach the 2007 World Series.

In the World Series, Colorado faced the Boston Red Sox. But the winning ways came to an end, and the Rockies were swept in four games. Injuries to several regulars caused the Rockies to fade in 2008, and after a poor start in 2009, Hurdle was fired on May 29. Although Hurdle was offered a "significant role" within the Rockies organization, he decided to join the MLB Network as a studio analyst for the remainder of 2009. He finished with a 534–625 win–loss record.

=== Texas Rangers ===
On November 4, 2009, he was hired as the hitting coach for the Texas Rangers. The Rangers hoped that Hurdle could connect with Josh Hamilton, who also suffered from substance abuse. In 2010, Hurdle helped the Rangers to their first American League pennant in franchise history before losing to the San Francisco Giants in the 2010 World Series.

=== Pittsburgh Pirates ===
After interviewing with both the Pittsburgh Pirates and New York Mets for their vacant managerial positions, Hurdle was hired by the Pirates on November 14, 2010, six weeks after John Russell had been fired, though much of the delay was attributed to the rule that the Pirates could not interview him until after the Rangers' World Series run.

At the 2011 All-Star break, Hurdle had led the Pirates to a 47–43 record, one game out of first place in the NL Central. It was the first time the Pirates had been over .500 going into the All-Star break since winning the 1992 National League East. At the 2012 All-Star break, Hurdle had led the Pirates to a 48–37 record, leading the NL Central division by one game over the Cincinnati Reds. However, both seasons ended with collapses that led to the Pirates' 19th and 20th straight losing seasons.

During parts of the 2013 season, the Pirates led the National League Central, with the best record in the major leagues, again aiming to snap the franchise's long losing streak. On September 9, 2013, with a 1–0 win over the Texas Rangers Clint Hurdle's Pittsburgh Pirates attained win number 82. On September 23, 2013, with a 2–1 win over the Chicago Cubs and a win by the St. Louis Cardinals over the Washington Nationals, the Pittsburgh Pirates secured their first playoff berth since 1992 as well as their 90th win. Under Hurdle, the Pirates would finish the 2013 season with a record of 94 wins and 68 losses, three games behind the NL Central division winning Cardinals. In the playoffs, the Pirates won the 2013 National League Wild Card Game against the Reds but would lose the deciding game five against the Cardinals in the 2013 National League Division Series. Hurdle won the National League Sporting News Manager of the Year Award in 2013.

In 2014, the Pirates would again clinch a playoff berth with a record of 88 wins and 74 losses to make a second straight appearance in the Wild Card game. The Pirates lost the 2014 National League Wild Card Game to the eventual World Series champion San Francisco Giants.

In 2015 the Pirates again made the postseason as one of the National League wild card teams with a 98–64 record, the second best record of any team that season. The Pirates lost the 2015 National League Wild Card Game to the Chicago Cubs.

In 2016 the Pirates missed the postseason for the first time since 2012 with a 78–83 record while Hurdle reached win 1,000 as a manager on June 24 against the Los Angeles Dodgers

In 2017 the Pirates missed the postseason for the second season in a row with a 75–87 record.

In 2018 the Pirates missed the postseason for the third season in a row but finished for the first time since 2015 with a winning record of 82–79. An odd quirk is that it was the first time in 30 years that the Pirates finished with a winning record without reaching the postseason.

On September 28, 2019, Hurdle was fired as manager due to a second-half slump after missing the playoffs for four straight seasons. He subsequently retired from baseball on November 12, 2019.

=== Colorado Rockies (second stint) ===
On December 9, 2021, Hurdle came out of retirement and joined the Colorado Rockies organization as a special assistant to the general manager. On April 17, 2025, Hurdle was named hitting coach for the remainder of the season after hitting coach Hensley Meulens was fired. On May 11, Hurdle was named interim bench coach, while retaining his hitting coach duties, after the firing of manager Bud Black and bench coach Mike Redmond. He was not brought back onto the staff for the 2026 season, and announced his retirement at the end of that season.

=== Managerial record ===
Team	Year	Regular season					Postseason			
Team	Year	Games	Won	Lost	Win %	Finish	Won	Lost	Win %	Result
COL	2002	140	67	73	.479	4th in NL West	–	–	–	–
COL	2003	162	74	88	.457	4th in NL West	–	–	–	–
COL	2004	162	68	94	.420	4th in NL West	–	–	–	–
COL	2005	162	67	95	.414	5th in NL West	–	–	–	–
COL	2006	162	76	86	.469	5th in NL West	–	–	–	–
COL	2007	163	90	73	.552	2nd in NL West	7	4	.636	Lost World Series (BOS)
COL	2008	162	74	88	.457	3rd in NL West	–	–	–	–
COL	2009	46	18	28	.391	(fired)	–	–	–	–
COL total		1,159	534	625	.461		7	4	.636	
PIT	2011	162	72	90	.444	4th in NL Central	–	–	–	–
PIT	2012	162	79	83	.488	4th in NL Central	–	–	–	–
PIT	2013	162	94	68	.580	2nd in NL Central	3	3	.500	Lost NLDS (STL)
PIT	2014	162	88	74	.543	2nd in NL Central	0	1	.000	Lost NLWC (SF)
PIT	2015	162	98	64	.605	2nd in NL Central	0	1	.000	Lost NLWC (CHC)
PIT	2016	162	78	83	.484	3rd in NL Central	–	–	–	–
PIT	2017	162	75	87	.463	4th in NL Central	–	–	–	–
PIT	2018	161	82	79	.509	4th in NL Central	–	–	–	–
PIT	2019	161	69	92	.429	5th in NL Central (fired before season finale)	–	–	–	–
PIT total		1,456	735	720	.505		3	5	.375	
Total		2,615	1,269	1,345	.485		10	9	.526	

== Personal life ==
Hurdle has been divorced twice. In addition to daughter Ashley (b. 1985) from a previous marriage, Hurdle and his third wife Karla (married 1999) have two children together, daughter Madison (who was born in 2002 with Prader-Willi Syndrome) and son Christian (b. 2004). Hurdle is a recovering alcoholic and an advocate of Alcoholics Anonymous and other addiction treatment programs as well as for the Prader-Willi Syndrome Association.

== See also ==
- List of Major League Baseball managers with most career wins

Sporting positions
Preceded by first manager	St. Lucie Mets Manager; 1988–1989	Succeeded by Tim Blackwell
Preceded by Steve Swisher	Jackson Mets Manager; 1990	Succeeded by last manager
Preceded by first manager	Williamsport Bills Manager; 1991	Succeeded by last manager
Preceded by Steve Swisher	Norfolk Tides Manager; 1992–1993	Succeeded by Bobby Valentine
Preceded by Ken Griffey Sr.	Colorado Rockies Hitting Coach; 1997–2002	Succeeded by Alan Cockrell
Preceded by Buddy Bell	Colorado Rockies Manager; 2002–2009	Succeeded by Jim Tracy
Preceded by Rudy Jaramillo	Texas Rangers Hitting Coach; 2010	Succeeded by Thad Bosley
Preceded by John Russell	Pittsburgh Pirates Manager; 2011–2019	Succeeded by Derek Shelton
Preceded by Hensley Meulens	Colorado Rockies Hitting Coach; 2025–present	Succeeded by TBA
Preceded by Mike Redmond	Colorado Rockies Bench Coach; 2025–present	Succeeded by TBA
