= Engelb Vielma =

Venezuelan baseball player (born 1994)

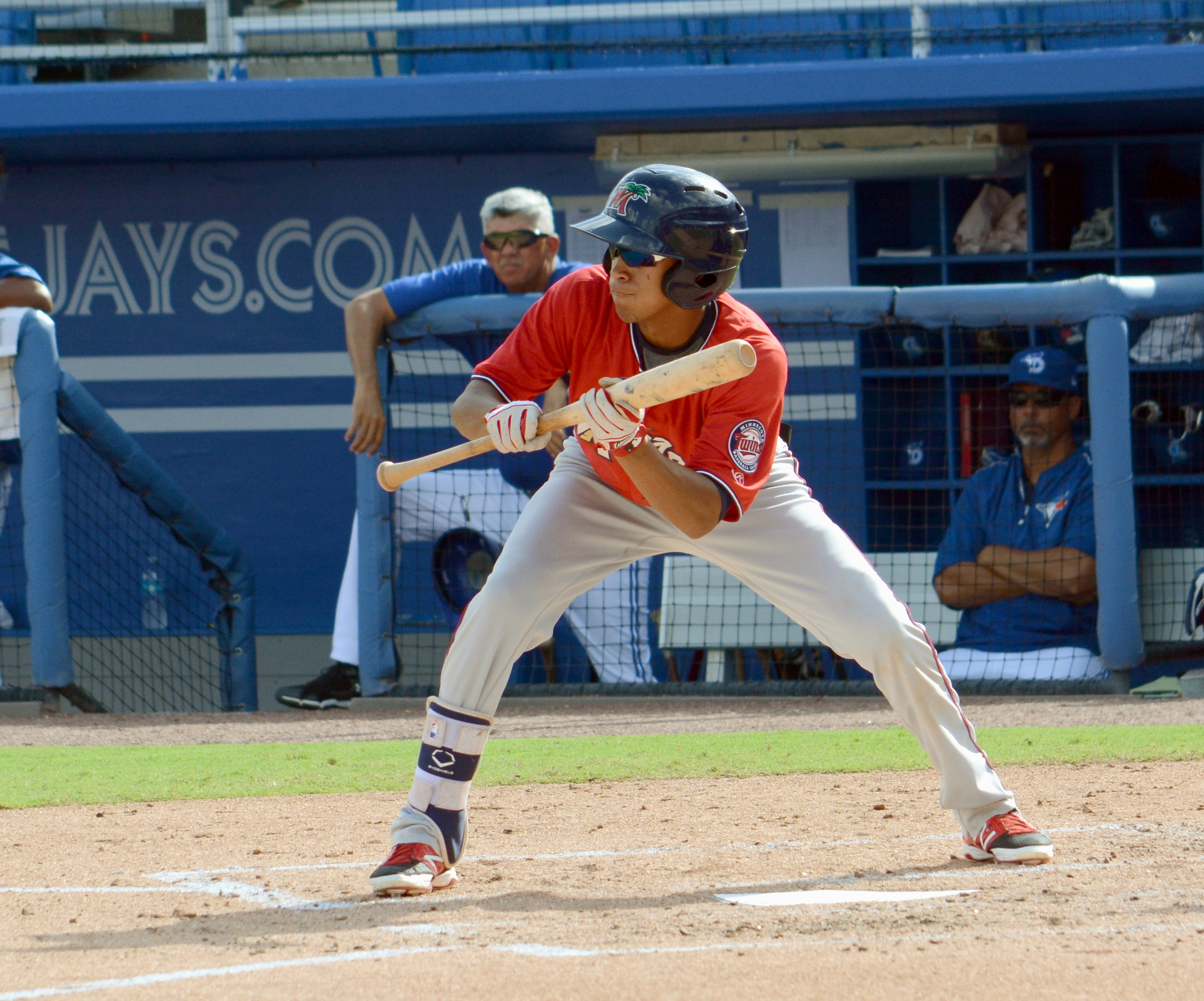
- Vielma with the Fort Myers Miracle

Delfines de La Guaira – No. 2
- Infielder
- Born: June 22, 1994 (age 32); Maracaibo, Venezuela
- Bats: Switch Throws: Right

MLB debut
- April 13, 2018, for the Baltimore Orioles

MLB statistics
- Batting average: .143
- Home runs: 0
- Runs batted in: 0
- Stats at Baseball Reference

Teams
- Baltimore Orioles (2018)

Engelb Stalin Vielma (born June 22, 1994) is a Venezuelan professional baseball infielder for the Delfines de La Guaira of the Venezuelan Major League. Vielma signed with the Minnesota Twins as an international free agent in 2011. He previously played in Major League Baseball (MLB) for the Baltimore Orioles.

== Career ==
=== Minnesota Twins ===
Vielma signed with the Minnesota Twins as an international free agent on September 8, 2011. He made his professional debut in 2012 with the Dominican Summer League Twins, logging a .268/.354/.331 slash line in 44 games. In 2013, Vielma split the season between the rookie-level Elizabethton Twins and the rookie-level GCL Twins, posting a cumulative .234/.318/.253 slash line with no home runs and 12 RBI. For the 2014 season, Vielma played for the Single-A Cedar Rapids Kernels, slashing .266/.313/.323 with his first pro home run and 33 RBI. The following year, Vielma played with the High-A Fort Myers Miracle, hitting .270/.321/.306 with 1 home run and 29 RBI. In 2016, Vielma split the year between Fort Myers and the Double-A Chattanooga Lookouts, accumulating a .265/.344/.310 batting line with 21 RBI.

The Twins added Vielma to their 40-man roster after the 2016 season. Between Chattanooga and the Triple-A Rochester Red Wings in 2017, he batted .229/.273/.280. On September 12, 2017, Vielma was designated for assignment following the selection of Gabriel Moya to the active roster.

=== Baltimore Orioles ===
On September 14, 2017, Vielma was claimed off waivers by the San Francisco Giants. On November 20, Vielma was claimed off waivers by the Philadelphia Phillies. On December 11, Vielma was again claimed off waivers by the Pittsburgh Pirates. On January 14, 2018, Vielma was designated for assignment by Pittsburgh. On January 18, Vielma was traded back to the San Francisco Giants. On January 23, the Giants designated Vielma for assignment.

On January 26, Vielma was traded to the Baltimore Orioles. He made his major league debut on April 13, 2018 against the Boston Red Sox, and was optioned down to the Triple-A Norfolk Tides on April 20. In a May 9 game in Norfolk, Vielma tripped over a mound banged his knee into a bullpen railing while attempting to catch a foul ball. It was later announced that Vielma had suffered a fractured patella that would require surgery. As a result of the injury, Vielma missed the remainder of the season. In 6 games in his rookie season, Vielma went 1-for-7 with a walk. On November 20, 2018, Vielma was designated for assignment by the Orioles.

Vielma was assigned to Norfolk to begin the 2019 season, and split the year with the Tides and the Double-A Bowie Baysox. In 40 games between the two teams, Vielma slashed .205/.312/.279 with no home runs and 10 RBI. On November 4, 2019, he elected free agency.

=== Diablos Rojos del México ===
On July 6, 2021, Vielma signed with the Diablos Rojos del México of the Mexican League. In 25 games, he slashed .212/.250/.282 with 1 home run and 8 RBIs before being released on August 17, 2021.

=== Cleburne Railroaders ===
On March 1, 2022, Vielma signed with the Cleburne Railroaders of the American Association of Professional Baseball. Vielma became a free agent after the 2023 season.

=== Caciques de Distrito ===
In Jun 2025, Vielma signed with the Caciques de Distrito of the Venezuelan Major League.

=== Delfines de La Guaira ===
In 2026, Vielma signed with the Delfines de La Guaira of the Venezuelan Major League.
