= James Boyd (novelist) =

American novelist

James Boyd (July 2, 1888 – February 25, 1944) was an American novelist, most famous for his Revolutionary War novel Drums, which was illustrated by N.C. Wyeth.

== Early life and education ==
Boyd was born in Dauphin County, Pennsylvania, into a wealthy coal and oil family. He was the son of John Yeomans Boyd and Eleanor Gilmore Herr Boyd, who were from North Carolina. He attended The Hill School. He attended Princeton University where he wrote verse and fiction for the Tiger and was its managing editor in his senior year. After graduation in 1910, he studied at Trinity College and Cambridge.

== Career ==
Boyd served overseas with the Army Ambulance Service in World War I. After World War I, he experienced ill health, and retired to Weymouth, a house his grandfather built in Southern Pines, North Carolina. The house was added to the National Register of Historic Places in 1982.

Boyd's first book, Drums, was set in Edenton, North Carolina, and has been called the best novel written about the American Revolution. Illustrated by N.C. Wyeth, Drums was included in Life Magazine's list of the 100 outstanding books of 1924–1944. He wrote five historical novels, including Bitter Creek, which were thought to have elevated the genre through greater historical accuracy, psychological and sociological awareness, and formal craftsmanship.

In 1940, Boyd organized the Free Company of Players, a group of American writers. This was a coalition of talent that, despite the powerful opposition of right-wing conservative interests (who?), produced a series of original radio plays in response to what they saw as antidemocratic attitudes prevalent in America due to the growing war in Europe. One of his major accomplishments was to bring to his hometown and Weymouth many of the finest writers of the time. Some of the writers who attended were Paul Green, Thomas Wolfe, Sherwood Anderson, William Faulkner, Struthers Burt, and John Galsworthy. In 1941, Boyd bought The Pilot, a regional newspaper.

Boyd died in 1944, at age 55, in Princeton, New Jersey, where he had traveled for a speaking engagement.

== Bibliography ==
- Drums (1925)
- Marching On (1927)
- Long Hunt (1930)
- Bitter Creek (1939)
- Roll River (1935)
- The Free Company Presents
- Eighteen Poems (1944)
- Old Pines and Other Stories
