= Dillon Maples =

American baseball pitcher (born 1992)

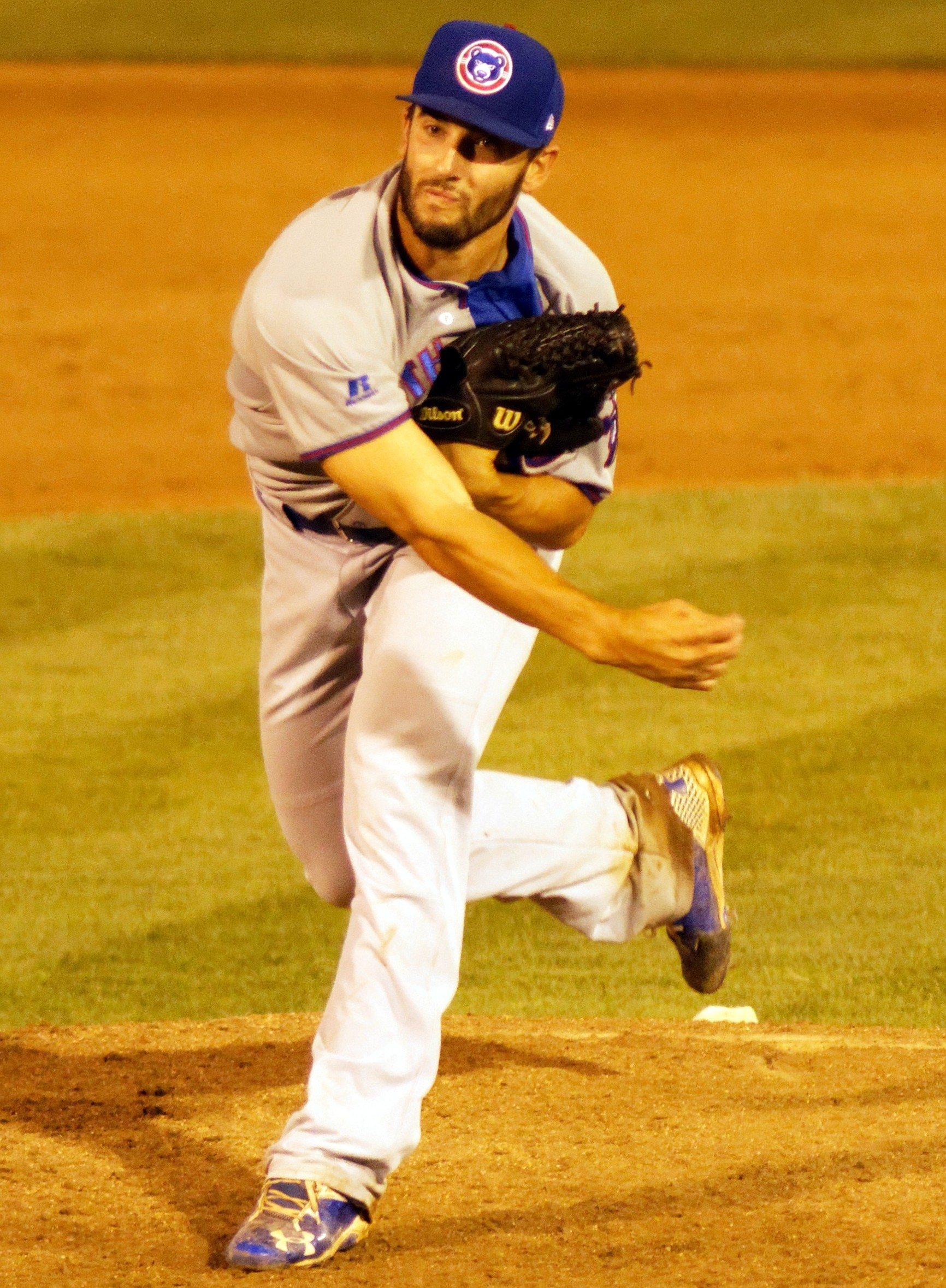
- Maples with the South Bend Cubs in 2016
- Pitcher
- Born: May 9, 1992 (age 34); Sanford, North Carolina, U.S.
- Batted: Right Threw: Right

MLB debut
- September 3, 2017, for the Chicago Cubs

Last MLB appearance
- September 17, 2021, for the Chicago Cubs

MLB statistics
- Win–loss record: 3–0
- Earned run average: 5.10
- Strikeouts: 79
- Stats at Baseball Reference

Teams
- Chicago Cubs (2017–2021)

Dillon Sean Maples (born May 9, 1992) is an American former professional baseball pitcher. He played in Major League Baseball (MLB) for the Chicago Cubs from 2017 to 2021.

== Playing career ==
=== Chicago Cubs ===
Maples attended Pinecrest High School in Southern Pines, North Carolina. He was also on the USA Baseball Under 18 team in 2010. The Chicago Cubs selected Maples in the 14th round of the 2011 Major League Baseball draft. He made his professional debut in 2012 with the Arizona League Cubs. From 2013 to 2016 he pitched for the Boise Hawks, Kane County Cougars, Arizona League Cubs, Eugene Emeralds, South Bend Cubs and Myrtle Beach Pelicans.

Maples started 2017 with Myrtle Beach and was promoted to the Tennessee Smokies and Iowa Cubs during the season. He has spent most of 2017-19 bouncing between Wrigley Field and Des Moines.

On September 14, 2019, Maples was ejected from the game in the ninth inning of a 14-1 win over the Pittsburgh Pirates for hitting two batters with pitches after warnings had been issued earlier in the game. On the season, Maples appeared in 14 games, registering a 5.40 ERA with 18 strikeouts in 11.2 innings of work. Maples only made two appearances for Chicago in 2020, recording a 18.00 ERA in 1.0 inning pitched.

In 2021, Maples made 28 appearances for the Cubs, posting a 2.59 ERA and 40 strikeouts. On September 19, 2021, Maples was designated for assignment by the Cubs.

=== Philadelphia Phillies ===
On March 15, 2022, Maples signed a minor league contract with the Philadelphia Phillies. In 19 games for the Triple–A Lehigh Valley IronPigs, he struggled to a 6.28 ERA with 18 strikeouts across 14 1/3 innings of work. On June 25, Maples was released by the Phillies organization.

== Coaching career ==
In April 2023, Maples revealed that he had returned to Pinecrest High School as an assistant coach. The decision came following shoulder surgery that repaired a labral tear and cleaned out his rotator cuff on his right shoulder.
