= Aymar Embury II =

American architect (1880–1966)

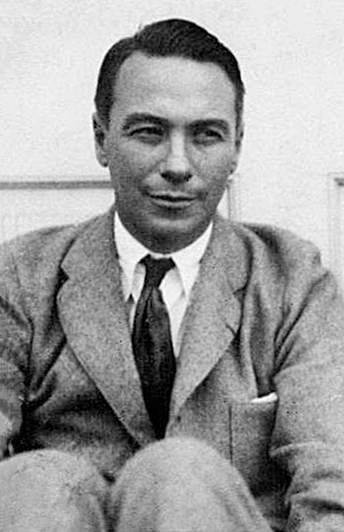
- Passport application, 1923
- Born: June 15, 1880; New York City, United States
- Died: November 15, 1966 (aged 86); Southampton, Long Island, New York
- Education: Princeton University
- Occupation: Architect
- Spouse(s): Dorothy Coe, Ruth Dean, Josephine Bound, Jane Schabbehar
- Children: Edward Coe Embury, Carl Richard Embury, Peter Aymar Embury, Mrs. Hugh Hack
- Parent(s): Aymar Embury, Fannie Miller Bates

Aymar Embury II (June 15, 1880 – November 15, 1966) was an American architect. He is best known for commissions from the City of New York from the 1930s through the 1950s when he frequently worked with Robert Moses in the latter's various city and state capacities, especially, early on, during Moses’ tenure as New York City Parks Commissioner. Many surviving examples of Embury's work are zoos, swimming pools, playgrounds, and other recreational structures in New York City parks.

== Biography ==
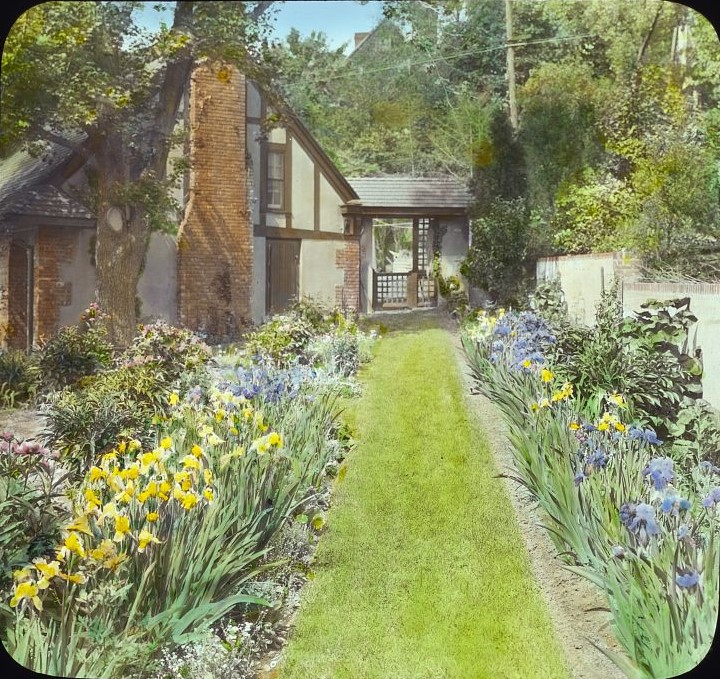
Daniel Elezer Pomeroy House, completed about 1915 on Beech Road, Englewood, New Jersey; photographed by Frances Benjamin Johnston in 1918. Aymar Embury II, architect, Ruth Bramley Dean, landscape design. (Demolished)

Embury was born in New York City to Aymar Embury and Fannie Miller Bates. Married four times, his first union was with Dorothy Coe in 1904. They later divorced, and he married Ruth Dean. Dean was a famous landscape designer who designed Grey Gardens during the marriage. The two worked out of the same office but had separate shingles for their businesses.

A widower in 1932, he married Josephine Bound in 1934, which ended in divorce. He was survived by his fourth wife, Jane Schabbehar. From the 1930s on, Embury maintained Manhattan and East Hampton, Long Island residences, and was active in East Hampton society.

== Early professional career ==
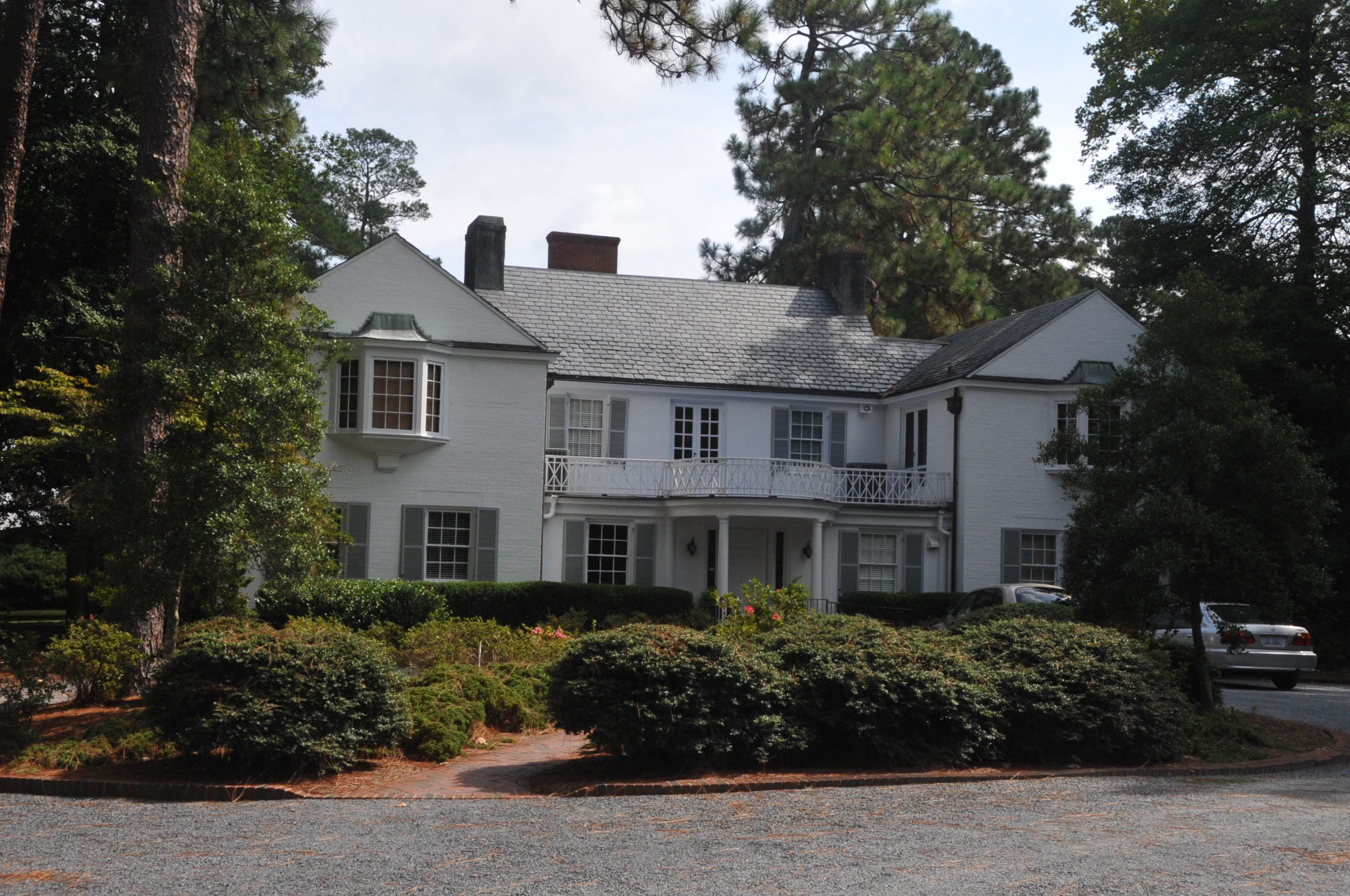
The James Boyd House (1920s), in Southern Pines, North Carolina, listed on the National Register of Historic Places

Aymar Embury graduated from Princeton University in 1900 with a degree in civil engineering and further received a Masters of Science degree in 1901. Following graduate studies, Embury taught architecture at Princeton while also working for various firms in New York City, including Cass Gilbert, George B. Post, Howells & Stokes, and Palmer and Hornbostel. During this period he developed a keen interest in the architecture of small country houses, publishing several books and pamphlets on the subject. In 1905, Embury won both the first and second prize in a design contest sponsored by the Garden City Company for a modest country house in Garden City, Long Island. This gave him visibility as a "society architect"; he acquired a reputation as a builder of country houses for the upper middle class and received many further commissions for such houses in the years surrounding World War I. He designed the James Boyd House, also known as Weymouth, at Southern Pines, North Carolina, and it was added to the National Register of Historic Places in 1977.

=== Military career ===
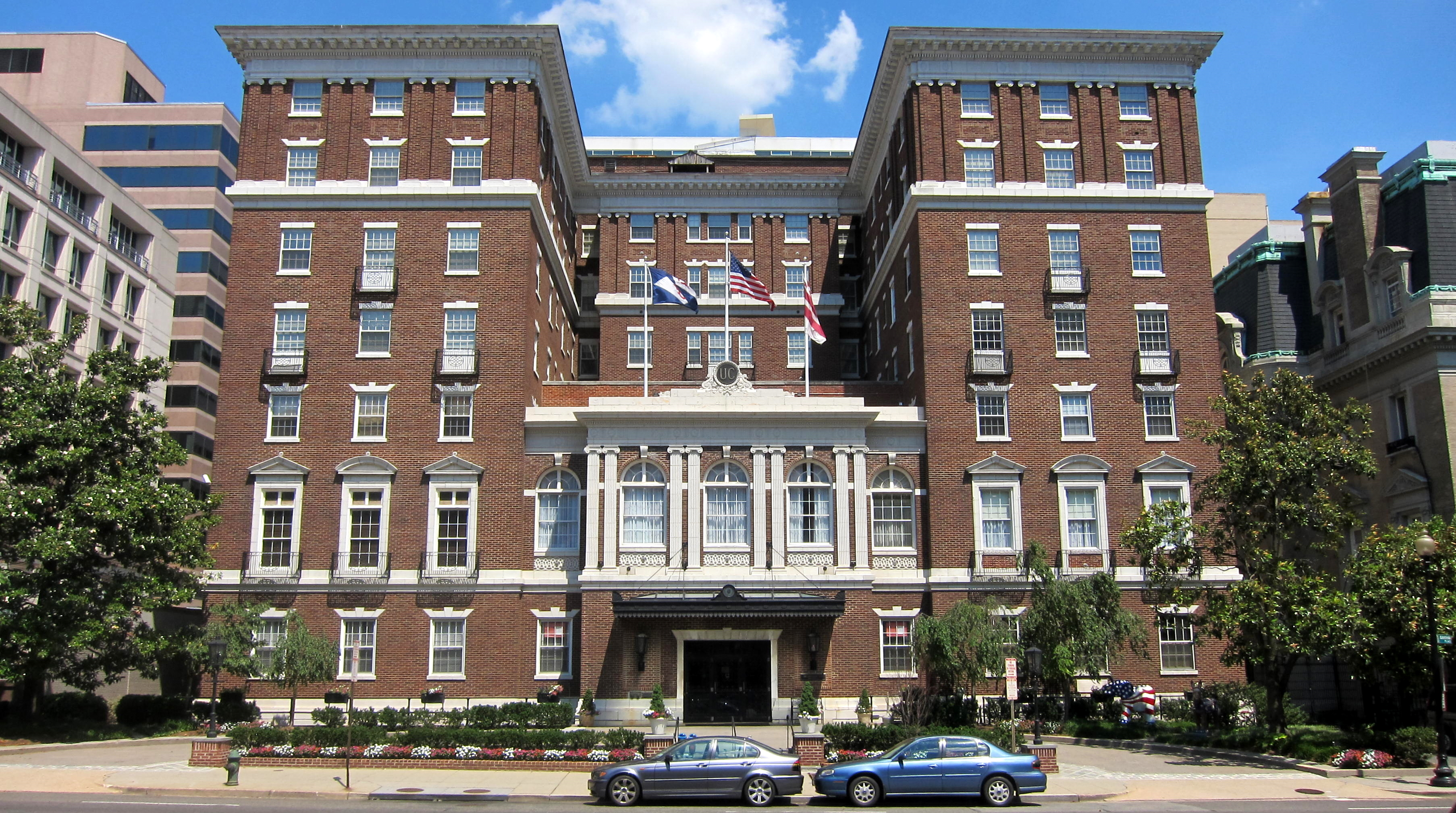
The University Club of Washington, DC (1920)

Embury served for fourteen months during World War I as a captain in the Fortieth Engineers, United States Army Corps of Engineers where he helped establish a unit of eight professional artists to document the activities of the American Expeditionary Force in France. During this time, Capt. Embury designed the Distinguished Service Cross and the Distinguished Service Medal. Later, in 1932, he became a lieutenant colonel in the Officers Reserve Corps.

=== Post-war activities ===
By the late 1920s, Embury was well-known and had received a wide range of commissions all over the east coast of the United States, entailing college buildings and social clubs in addition to residences. He designed the Players and Nassau Clubs in Princeton, New Jersey, the Princeton Club of New York, the University Club in Washington, D.C., and the Mountain Brook Country Club in Mountain Brook, Alabama He designed the Hope Valley Country Club Clubhouse at Durham, North Carolina, in 1927.

In 1930 he was appointed consulting architect by the Port of New York Authority He consulted on the Authority's Inland Terminal. As of the Authority's 1933 annual report, he was listed as Architect.

== Work with Robert Moses ==
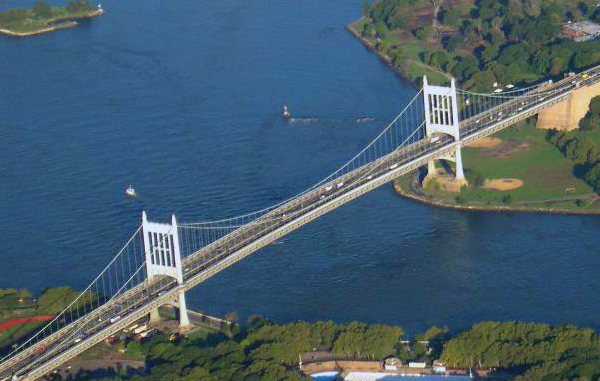
The Queens-Wards Island span of the Triborough Bridge (1936)

In 1934, Mayor Fiorello La Guardia appointed Robert Moses as sole commissioner of a newly unified Department of Parks for New York City, commencing a seven-year period of construction and renovation of city parks. Embury, along with landscape architect Gilmore D. Clarke, was a senior member of the 1,800-member design and construction team that Moses had assembled at the Arsenal in Central Park.

In the following years, Embury was chief or consulting architect for numerous projects in the New York City area. Exact figures are not available, but it is possible that Embury supervised the design of over six hundred public projects. Surviving examples include zoos such as the Central Park Zoo and Prospect Park Zoo; parks such as Bryant Park, Betsy Head Park, Crotona Park, Jacob Riis Park, McCarren Park, Red Hook Park, and Sunset Park; bridges including the Triborough Bridge and Henry Hudson Bridge; and other features including the New York City Building at the 1939 New York World's Fair (now the Queens Museum), Orchard Beach, Prospect Park Bandshell, and the Hofstra University Campus.

== Later work ==
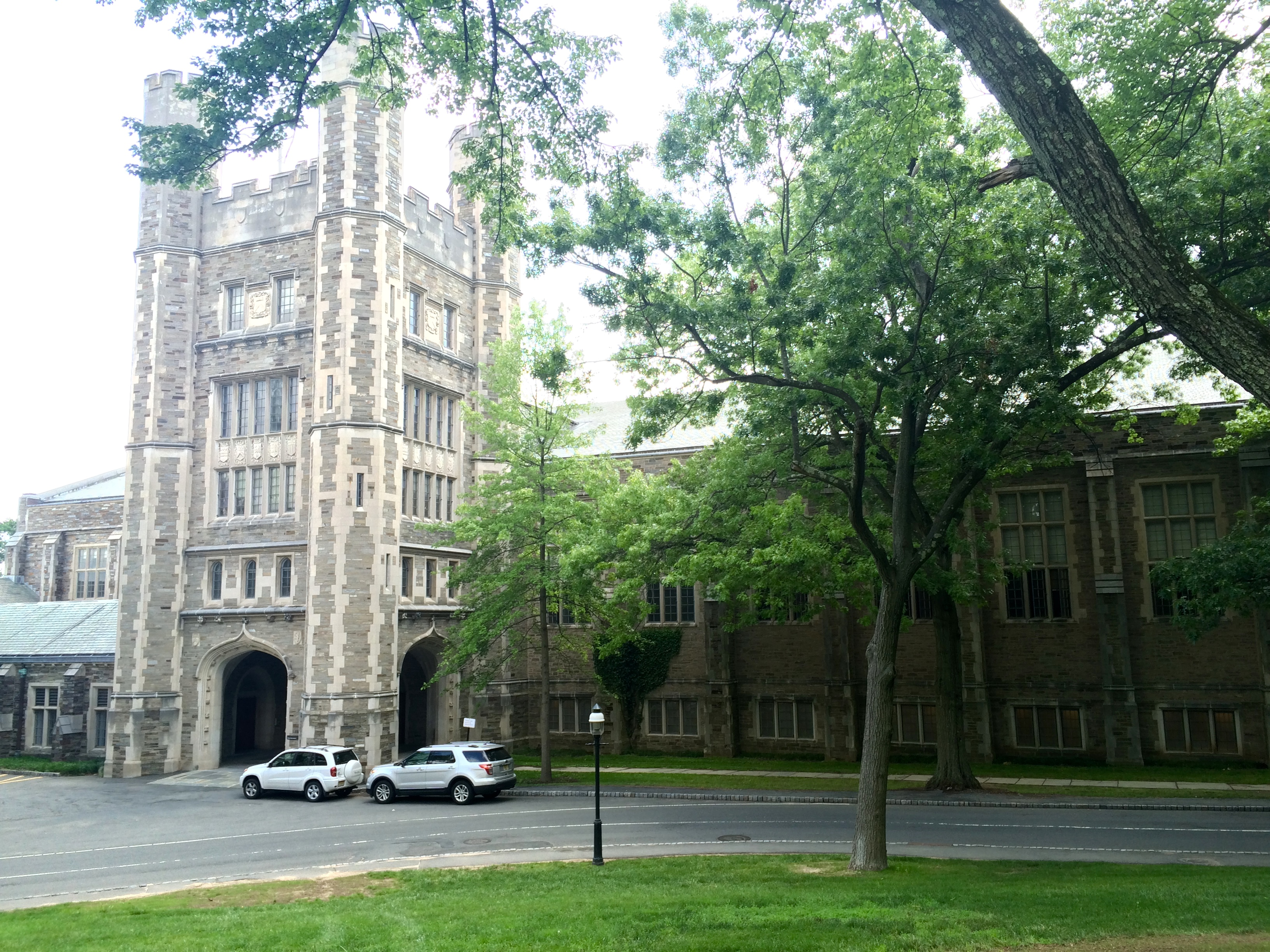
Dillon Gymnasium (1947) at Embury's alma mater, Princeton University

In 1937, Embury was commissioned by the Ladies Home Journal to design a Mount Vernon replica house. The plans were published in the October 1937 issue.

In 1947, Embury designed the Dillon Gymnasium for Princeton University after the previous gymnasium was destroyed in a fire.

The eastern shore of Conservatory Water in Central Park in Manhattan, New York City, contains the Kerbs Memorial Boathouse, designed by Embury, where patrons can rent and navigate radio-controlled and wind-powered model boats. The 1954 boathouse, in picnic Georgian taste with red brick and a green copper hip roof and steeple, outside which is a flagstone patio, houses resident model sailboats as well as the radio-controlled model yachts of the Central Park Model Yacht Club.

He remained active throughout the 1950s, turning over his firm to his son, Edward Coe Embury, in 1956. Remaining active as a consulting architect, Embury served on the architectural advisory committee for the old New York Coliseum at Columbus Circle; was a consulting architect for the New York Aquarium at Coney Island; designed the campus playhouse for Hofstra University in Hempstead, Long Island; designed the William Church Memorial Playground near Fifth Avenue; and designed the Donnell Library Center in Manhattan.

== Books by Aymar Embury II ==
- Embury, Aymar (1909). One Hundred Country Houses: Modern American Examples. The Century Company. p. 4. "One Hundred Country Houses."
- The Dutch Colonial House. McBride, Nast, and Company. 1913. LCCN 13009857.
- Embury, Aymar (1914). Early American Churches. New York: Doubleday, Page, and Company. "Embury Country Houses."
- Day, Frank Miles; Howe, Samuel; Close, Bernard Wells; Sexton, Randolph Williams; Coffin, Lewis Augustus (1915). American Country Houses of Today.
- The Livable House: Its Plan and Design. New York: Moffat, Yard and Co. 1917. LCCN 17014400.
- Houses in South Eastern Massachusetts (The White Pine Series of Architectural Monographs, Volume XIV, No. 1) New York: Russell F. Whitehead, 1928.
- The Aesthetics of Engineering Construction. 1943.
