= Charlie Engle =

Charlie Engle may refer to:

- Charlie Engle (baseball) (1903–1983), infielder for the Philadelphia Athletics and Pittsburgh Pirates
- Charlie Engle (marathoner) (born 1962), endurance runner who appeared in the documentary film Running the Sahara
