= Southern Pines Historic District =

Historic district in North Carolina, United States

- U.S. National Register of Historic Places
- U.S. Historic district
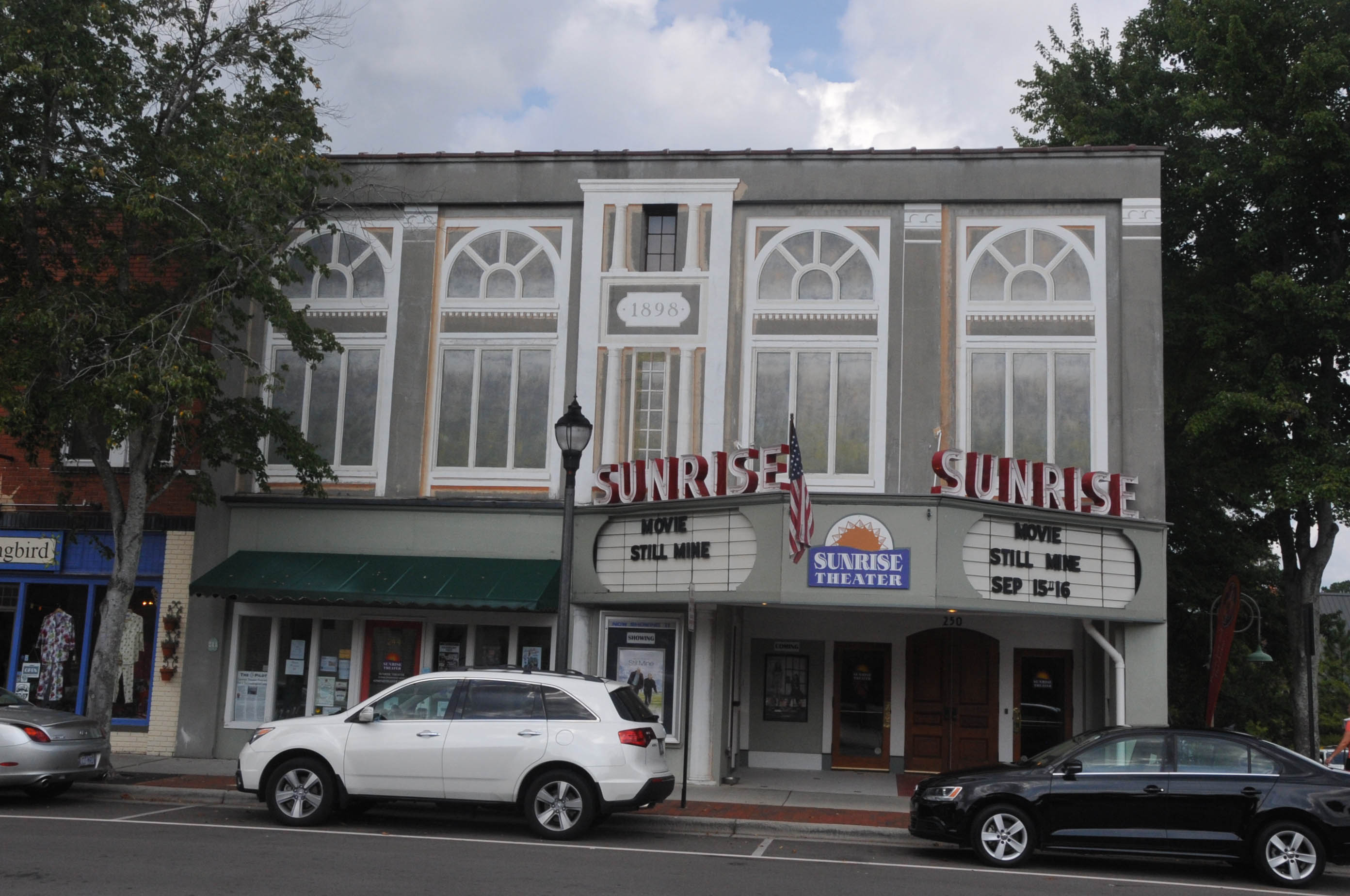

- Location within North Carolina Location within the United States
- Location: Bounded by Saylor St., New Jersey Ave., Illinois Ave. and Massachusetts Ave. Ext., Southern Pines, North Carolina
- Coordinates: 35°10′10″N 79°23′17″W
- Area: 320 acres (130 ha)
- Built: 1883
- Architect: Multiple
- Architectural style: Colonial Revival, Bungalow/craftsman, Queen Anne
- NRHP reference No.: 91001875
- Added to NRHP: December 27, 1991

Southern Pines Historic District is a historic district in Southern Pines, North Carolina. The district encompasses 490 contributing buildings, 2 contributing sites, and 3 contributing structures in the town of Southern Pines. It was developed between the 1883 and 1940 and includes notable examples of Queen Anne, Colonial Revival, and Bungalow / American Craftsman style architecture. Located in the district is the separately listed James Boyd House. Other notable buildings include Duncraig Manor, Loblolly, Seaboard Air Line Passenger Depot, Seaboard Air Line Freight Station, Sadelson Pharmacy-Tourist Building, Powell Furniture and Undertaking Building, Belvedere Hotel Building (1904), Arcade Building (1917), Princess Theatre / Carolina Theatre Building, Southern Pines Public Library (1939), U. S. Post Office (1937), First Baptist Church (1899), Church of Wide Fellowship (1927), Emmanuel Episcopal Church (1926) and First Church of Christ, Scientist (1928).

It was added to the National Register of Historic Places on December 27, 1991.
