= Church of the Advent (Southern Pines, North Carolina) =

Historic church in Southern Pines, North Carolina, United States

Coordinates: 35°10′22″N 79°23′21″W

- Location: 240 New Hampshire Avenue, Southern Pines, North Carolina
- Country: United States
- Denomination: Anglican Church in North America
- Website: thechurchoftheadvent.org

History
- Founded: 2022

Architecture
- Style: Colonial Revival
- Years built: 1928

Administration
- Diocese: Living Word

Clergy
- Rector: Michael McKinnon
- First Church of Christ, Scientist
- U.S. Historic district – Contributing property
- Part of: Southern Pines Historic District (ID91001875)
- Added to NRHP: December 27, 1991

The Church of the Advent is a historic church building in Southern Pines, North Carolina. Completed in 1928, the building is a contributing property to the Southern Pines Historic District.

== History ==
The church was built in 1928 as the home of the First Church of Christ, Scientist. The Christian Science congregation existed for 90 years until selling the building in 2018 and relocating. Initially, the building was bought by a local businessman who sought to redevelop it as office space. When a rezoning application was denied, the building was sold to a charitable foundation run by local resident Kathy Virtue bought the church with the goal of reselling it to a church plant in need of space. The building was renamed "Southern Pines Chapel" during this time and made available for weddings, prayer groups and other religious occasions.

Michael McKinnon, an Anglican Church in North America priest, had moved to Moore County and planted an ACNA congregation there called the Church of the Advent in 2022. Virtue agreed to sell the building to the Church of the Advent, which began meeting there in February 2023. The Church of the Advent completed the purchase of the building that summer, raising $103,000 for the purchase.

== Architecture ==
The 3,000 square feet (280 m^{2}) church building was designed in the Colonial Revival style. It is a brick building with a gabled slate roof with a pediment at the front. The front also features a pedimented portico supported by four Tuscan columns underneath a stucco tympanum with a lunette louver. The front double door is framed by Tuscan pilasters.

The front and side windows feature six-over-six amber glass windows with limestone sills and keystones set in the brick. At the rear of the church is a modern apsidal extension to the building.
