= Pink bat =

Baseball bat used in Mother's Day events

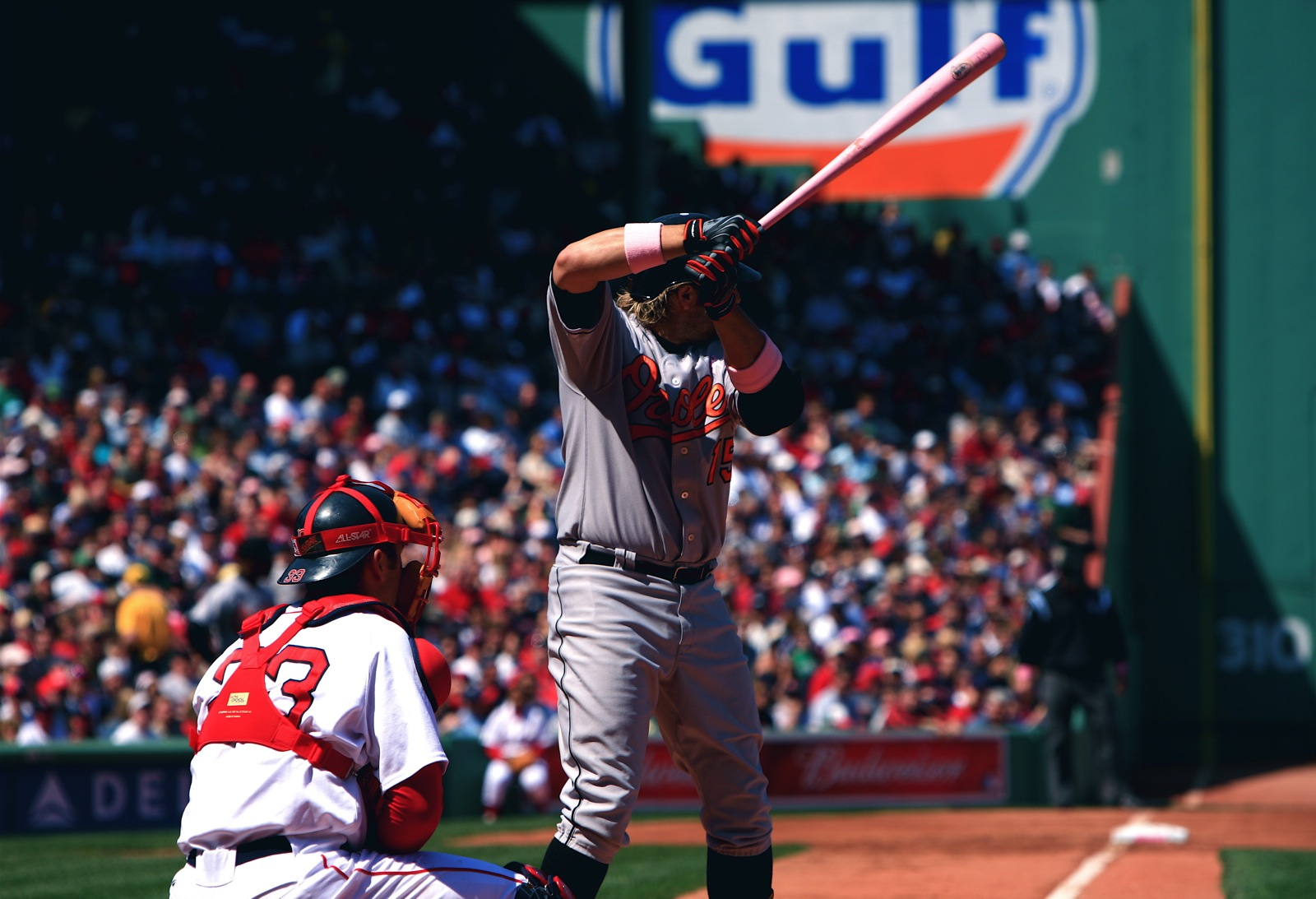
Kevin Millar readies for a pitch using a pink bat on Mother's Day 2007, playing for the Baltimore Orioles against the Boston Red Sox at Fenway Park.

In baseball, pink bats are limited-supply baseball bats manufactured by Louisville Slugger for use by select Major League Baseball players on Mother's Day, first introduced in 2006 in association with the Susan G. Komen for the Cure organization. Each year on Mother's Day, Major League Baseball authorizes the use of the specially dyed bats — temporarily suspending the regulation that restricts players to using black, brown, red, or white bats — as part of a weeklong program to benefit the Susan G. Komen for the Cure organization.

In addition to wielding the unique Sluggers, players and field-staff wear pink ribbons, pink wristbands, pink necklaces, pink bracelets, pink gloves, and pink cleats. Bases and homeplates are tagged with the breast cancer awareness logo, and line-ups are written on a pink card lineup card. All of the specially produced memorabilia is later autographed and auctioned off on MLB.com to benefit Komen for the Cure. In its debut season, "Major League Baseball and its fans collectively raised $350,000" through the program.

== Origin ==
In March 2006, John A. Hillerich IV, President and CEO of the Louisville Slugger parent-company Hillerich & Bradsby, made a visit to the Canadian-based sports company TPS Hockey, which had produced more than 400 pink hockey sticks for players in the NHL. Players including Tie Domi, Mats Sundin, Steve Yzerman, Sidney Crosby and Ed Belfour used the special sticks during the weekend of March 17, raising more than $110,000. Hillerich later presented the idea of the Pink Bat to MLB Commissioner Bud Selig and MLB President Bob DuPuy, who "both went to bat for the pink bat".

== 2006 ==
Players who brandished the distinctive bats in their inaugural season included Alex Ríos, Ryan Howard, Jimmy Rollins, Xavier Nady, Jim Thome, Carl Crawford, David Ortiz, Jim Edmonds, Toby Hall, Willy Taveras, Richie Sexson, Mark Teixeira, Travis Lee, Ken Griffey Jr., Doug Davis, Michael Young, Mark Kotsay, Jeff Francoeur, Greg Norton, Torii Hunter, Hank Blalock, Jason LaRue, Derek Jeter, Jermaine Dye, Mark Ellis, Prince Fielder, Jonny Gomes, Kevin Mench, Carl Everett, Joe Borchard, David Eckstein, Marcus Giles, Damon Hollins, Manny Ramírez, Adam Dunn, Bill Hall, Albert Pujols, Tomás Pérez, Craig Biggio, Doug Mientkiewicz, Vernon Wells, and Lance Berkman. Rios, Dye, Thome, Kotsay, LaRue, Bill Hall, and Berkman hit some of the few Pink Bat home runs with Hall's being a walk-off shot against the Mets, with his mother in the stands.

Other players, including Geoff Blum, Khalil Greene and Mike Cameron, flatly refused to use the unorthodox bats.

== 2007 ==
In its second year, the program outfitted more than 200 batters with the specialty Mother's Day bats, including Biggio, Blalock, Berkman, Dye, Hunter, Griffey, Young, Teixeira, Hall, Rollins, Albert Pujols, Rafael Furcal, Juan Uribe, David DeJesus, Mark Loretta, Brian Roberts, Estéban Germán, B. J. Upton, Pablo Ozuna, Kenny Lofton, Nick Markakis, Vernon Wells, Mike Sweeney, Carlos Lee, Delmon Young, Aubrey Huff, Shane Costa, Milton Bradley, Mark Teahen, Royce Clayton, Sammy Sosa, John Buck, Jay Payton, Jason Lane, Michael Cuddyer, Lyle Overbay, Joe Crede, Alex Gordon, Ramón Hernández, Julio Lugo, Brad Wilkerson, Dioner Navarro, Coco Crisp, Hunter Pence, Carlos Beltrán, J. D. Drew, Aaron Hill, Adam Everett, Reggie Willits, Kevin Youkilis, Gerald Laird, Brad Ausmus, Jason Varitek, Jason Phillips, Craig Monroe, Eric Hinske, Rocco Baldelli, Casey Kotchman, Tony Peña Jr., Morgan Ensberg, Nelson Cruz, Sean Casey, Alex Cora, Ryan Sweeney, Erick Aybar, Orlando Palmeiro, Curtis Granderson, Ian Kinsler, Dan Uggla, Paul Konerko, Ryan Zimmerman, Shea Hillenbrand, Brandon Inge, Robby Hammock, Mike Napoli, Luis Castillo, Cristian Guzmán, Gustavo Molina, Justin Morneau, Raúl Ibañez, Derrek Lee, Daryle Ward, Cliff Floyd, Aramis Ramírez, Aaron Rowand, Chase Utley, Ty Wigginton, Ryan Garko and David Wright.

Bill Hall, Hillenbrand, Beltran, Guzmán, Cuddyer, Teahen, Napoli hit some of the few Pink Bat home runs, while Biggio used a Pink Bat to go 2-for-4, collecting his 2,965th and 2,966th career hits (his 648th and 649th career doubles) for Houston. Griffey also hit a "pink homer", the 570th of his career to surpass Rafael Palmeiro and take sole possession of ninth place on the all-time career home runs list. And Hunter hit two Pink Bat home runs for the Twins — a three-run shot in the first inning and a two-run long ball in the eighth — and set a new career high for RBI in a game with seven.

Pitcher Mike Myers of the New York Yankees ordered a pink glove. Myers said he would ignore the rule and face a fine. Ultimately there was no issue since Myers did not appear in the game.

== 2008 ==
In its third year, the program offered pink wristbands and pink titanium necklaces made by MLB licensee Phiten. Ryan Braun and Craig Monroe each hit two Pink Bat homers for the Brewers and Twins, respectively. Carlos Beltrán and Ryan Church hit back-to-back homers with the Pink Bats for the Mets. Nick Swisher of the Chicago White Sox also dyed his goatee pink in honor of his deceased grandmother Betty.

== 2009 ==
In its fourth year, the pink bat was used on May 10 by, among others: Alex Ríos, José Bautista, Aaron Hill, Marco Scutaro, Adam Lind, Rod Barajas, Kevin Millar, Scott Rolen, Juan Pierre, Rafael Furcal, James Loney, Mark Loretta, Matt Kemp, Brad Ausmus, Mark Teahen, Evan Longoria, Carl Crawford, Ian Kinsler, Jimmy Rollins, Pedro Feliz, Shane Victorino, Chris Davis, Rickie Weeks, Jason Kendall, Corey Hart, J. J. Hardy, Bill Hall, Ken Griffey Jr., Justin Morneau, Nick Punto, Michael Cuddyer, Joe Mauer, Johnny Damon, Mark Teixeira, Nick Swisher, David Ortiz, and Carlos Beltrán.

Rios, Crawford, Weeks, Griffey, Damon, and Teixeira each hit "pink home runs", Pierre collected three hits; Orlando Hudson wore specially designed cleats bearing a pink Nike swoosh and pink laces.

Additionally, Major League Baseball ran the Honorary Bat Girl contest, "a campaign to recognize incredible MLB fans who are going to bat against breast cancer in their daily lives." Some of the contest winners included:

- Anne Fairchild for the Arizona Diamondbacks
- Cathy Greer for the Baltimore Orioles
- Mary Eno for the Washington Nationals
- Traci Clancy for the Cincinnati Reds
- Kathy Abel for the Philadelphia Phillies
- Dorothy Mucciarone for the Boston Red Sox
- Mary Murphy for the Chicago White Sox
- Traci Clancy for the Cincinnati Reds
- Jennifer Torok for the Cleveland Indians
- Reverend Kathy Bird DeYoung for the Colorado Rockies
- Karissa Ma for the Houston Astros
- Rebecca Hultquist for the Los Angeles Angels of Anaheim
- Julie Garfinkel for the Los Angeles Dodgers
- Jill Newman for the Milwaukee Brewers
- Ann Parriott for the Minnesota Twins
- Patricia Colella for the New York Mets

== 2010 ==
In its fifth year, the pink bat was used on May 9 by, among others: Ken Griffey Jr., Dioner Navarro, Gabe Kapler, Chris Coghlan, Jorge Cantú, Cody Ross, John Baker, Omar Infante, Martín Prado, Troy Glaus, Brian McCann, Matt Diaz, Brooks Conrad, Nate McLouth, Eric Hinske, Joe Mather, and Josh Hamilton.

Coghlan also plans on giving the bat he used to his mother, after having recorded his first three-hit game of the season with it.
