= Carl Everett =

American baseball player (born 1971)

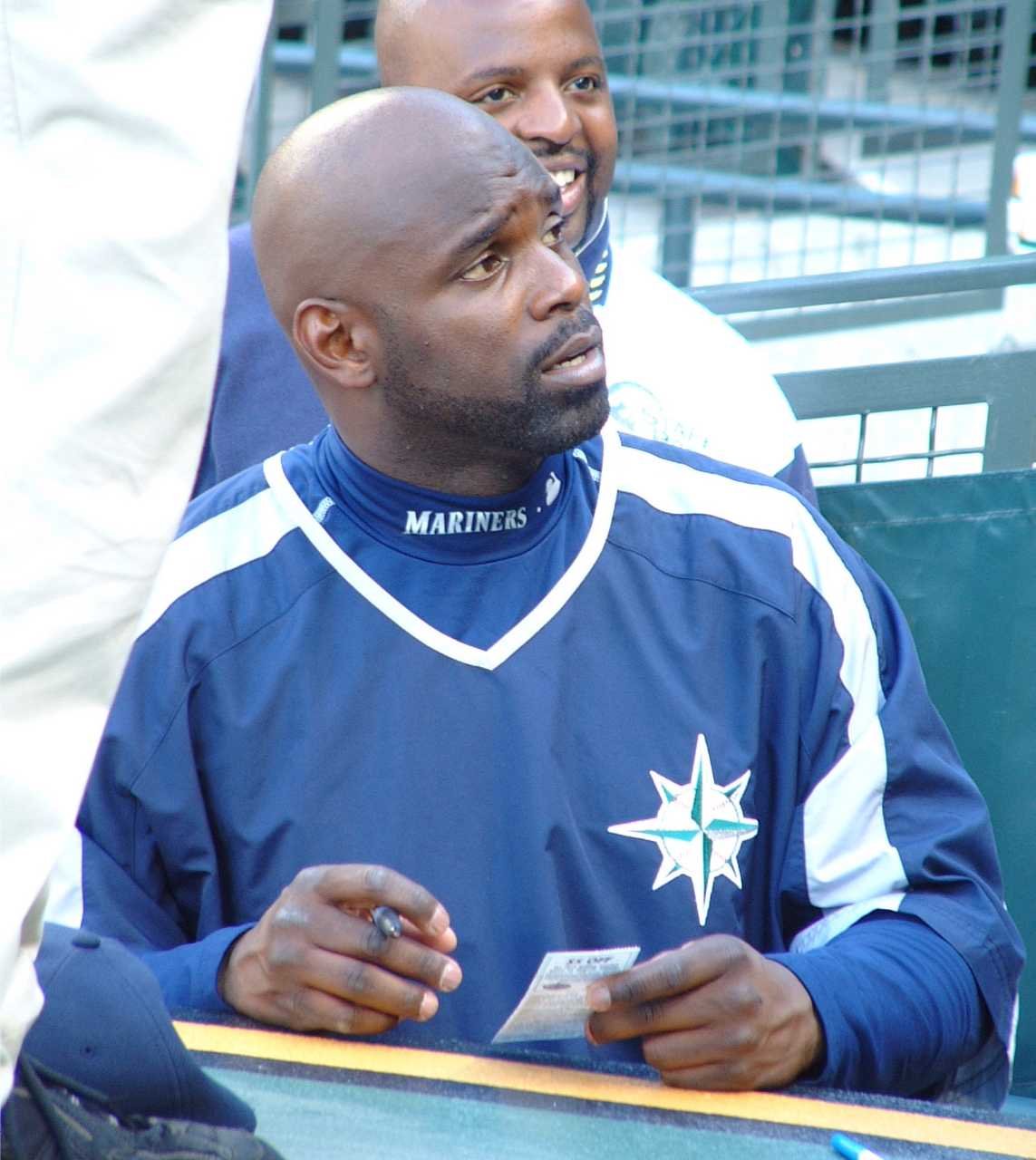
- Outfielder / Designated hitter
- Born: June 3, 1971 (age 55); Tampa, Florida, U.S.
- Batted: Switch Threw: Right

MLB debut
- July 1, 1993, for the Florida Marlins

Last MLB appearance
- July 25, 2006, for the Seattle Mariners

MLB statistics
- Batting average: .271
- Home runs: 202
- Runs batted in: 792
- Stats at Baseball Reference

Teams
- Florida Marlins (1993–1994); New York Mets (1995–1997); Houston Astros (1998–1999); Boston Red Sox (2000–2001); Texas Rangers (2002–2003); Chicago White Sox (2003); Montreal Expos (2004); Chicago White Sox (2004–2005); Seattle Mariners (2006)

Career highlights and awards
- 2× All-Star (2000, 2003); World Series champion (2005)

Carl Edward Everett III (born June 3, 1971) is an American former Major League Baseball outfielder. A switch hitter, he played for eight teams over the course of a 14-year career. He was a member of the Chicago White Sox when they won the 2005 World Series. He threw right-handed and played all outfield positions, and occasionally designated hitter.

== Early life ==
Everett attended Hillsborough High School in Tampa, Florida, and was a letterman in football, baseball, and track. In football, he garnered 948 rushing yards as a senior. He ran the 100 meters in 10.5 seconds.

== Playing career ==
The New York Yankees selected Everett with the 10th overall pick in the 1990 Major League Baseball (MLB) draft. After two minor league seasons, he was selected by the Florida Marlins in the 1992 MLB expansion draft. He made his major league debut with the Marlins on July 1, 1993.

Everett was traded to the New York Mets after the 1994 season for Quilvio Veras. He had his first full season in 1997. He hit .248 with a .420 slugging percentage in 142 game.

After the 1997 season, Everett was traded to the Houston Astros for John Hudek. He hit .325 with 27 stolen bases in 1999. His .571 slugging percentage was in the top 10 in the league.

After being traded on December 14, 1999, to the Boston Red Sox for minor leaguers Adam Everett and Greg Miller, Everett had a career high 34 home runs in 2000. In July, Everett was suspended for 10 days for bumping into umpire Ron Kulpa. The following August, Everett was fined for grabbing his crotch while yelling at Seattle Mariners pitcher Jamie Moyer after hitting a home run. He struggled in 2001, with a shoulder injury hampering his performance, and ongoing controversy with the Boston media serving as a distraction to the team. One of the few bright spots for Everett that season came on September 2, 2001, when Everett came into the game as a pinch hitter and broke up a potential perfect game by Mike Mussina of the New York Yankees. Mussina had retired the first 26 Boston Red Sox and gotten two strikes on Everett before he hit a soft single to left field. Everett was suspended later in September for arriving late to a team workout.

On December 12, 2001, Everett was traded to the Texas Rangers for Darren Oliver. His nine home runs in April 2003 matched a team record, shared with Iván Rodríguez (2000), Alex Rodriguez (2002) and later Ian Kinsler (2007), Josh Hamilton (2012), and Joey Gallo (2019).

Everett was traded to the Chicago White Sox during the 2003 season for Frank Francisco, Josh Rupe and Anthony Webster. He signed as a free agent with the Montreal Expos for the 2004 season, but was traded back to the White Sox on July 18, 2004, for Gary Majewski and Jon Rauch.

In October 2005, Everett won his first and only World Series championship with the White Sox. Everett stepped in as the starting DH for most of that season for the White Sox after an early season injury to Frank Thomas.

On December 14, 2005, Everett was signed by the Mariners off the free agent market to a one-year contract for the 2006 season with a vesting option for 2007. On Mother's Day, May 14, 2006, Everett was one of many hitters who brandished a pink bat to benefit the Breast Cancer Foundation. With the Mariners, Everett was primarily a designated hitter, rarely playing the field as a back up corner outfielder. He played in 92 games before the Mariners designated Everett for assignment on July 26. At the time of his release, Larry Stone wrote in the Seattle Times that he was 85th out of 86 AL players with qualifying at bats in batting average, at .227.

In 2007, Everett played for the Long Island Ducks of the Atlantic League of Professional Baseball. In 2007, he hit .312 with 25 home runs and 97 RBI. In 2008, he hit .327 with 29 home runs and 100 RBI in 115 games. In 2009, Everett was the designated hitter for the Newark Bears of the Atlantic League. He played for the Bears in 2010, as well. He batted .310 with 87 home runs in 422 games in his four seasons in the Atlantic League, Everett officially retired in 2011.

== Personal life ==
During his playing career, Everett was quite outspoken with his beliefs, and his remarks proved controversial on several occasions. Perhaps the best-known of these was his denial of the existence of dinosaurs. He was quoted as saying, "God created the sun, the stars, the heavens and the earth, and then made Adam and Eve. The Bible never says anything about dinosaurs. You can't say there were dinosaurs when you never saw them. Somebody actually saw Adam and Eve eating apples. No one ever saw a Tyrannosaurus rex." He also derided fossils of dinosaur bones as man-made fakes. In reference to these comments, Boston Globe columnist Dan Shaughnessy dubbed Everett "Jurassic Carl." Everett, in turn, referred to Shaughnessy as the "curly-haired boyfriend" of Globe beat writer Gordon Edes.

Everett, in an interview with Shaughnessy, questioned the validity of the Apollo Moon Landing.

Everett frequently got into altercations with umpires during his career in the US and in Venezuela. Some of these tirades have resulted in suspensions and fines. Everett's longest suspension came during the 2000 season after an incident in which he bumped heads with umpire Ron Kulpa while arguing Kulpa's ruling that Everett's batting stance was illegal. Everett was suspended for 10 games and fined $5,000. He also got into a postgame shouting match with Mariners manager Mike Hargrove after a loss to the Los Angeles Angels on July 5, 2006.

Everett has also made controversial remarks about homosexuality. He once said that if he had an openly gay teammate that he would consider retiring, or, at the very least, "set him straight." In the 2005 season, he told Maxim that he has had gay teammates and accepted them, but, "Gays being gay is wrong. Two women can't produce a baby, two men can't produce a baby, so it's not how it's supposed to be. ... I don't believe in gay marriages. I don't believe in being gay."

In 1997, Everett temporarily lost custody of two of his children when a worker at Shea Stadium noticed his five-year-old daughter covered in bruises. A family court judge found enough evidence to suggest child neglect on behalf of Everett and his wife, the latter of whom "inflicted excessive corporal punishment" on the children that Everett did nothing to stop. The Everetts did not admit to abuse or neglect, and a settlement was reached where they could be reunited with their children after undergoing therapy and attending parenting classes.

In April 2011, Everett was arrested at his home in Tampa on charges of aggravated assault with a deadly weapon and tampering with a witness. Everett held a handgun to the head of his wife. He was held at a $5,500 bond and ordered no violent contact with his wife, who asked for his release so he could take care of their three children. In September 2011, he was arrested again, for assaulting a family member.
