= Damon Hollins =

American baseball player & coach (born 1974)

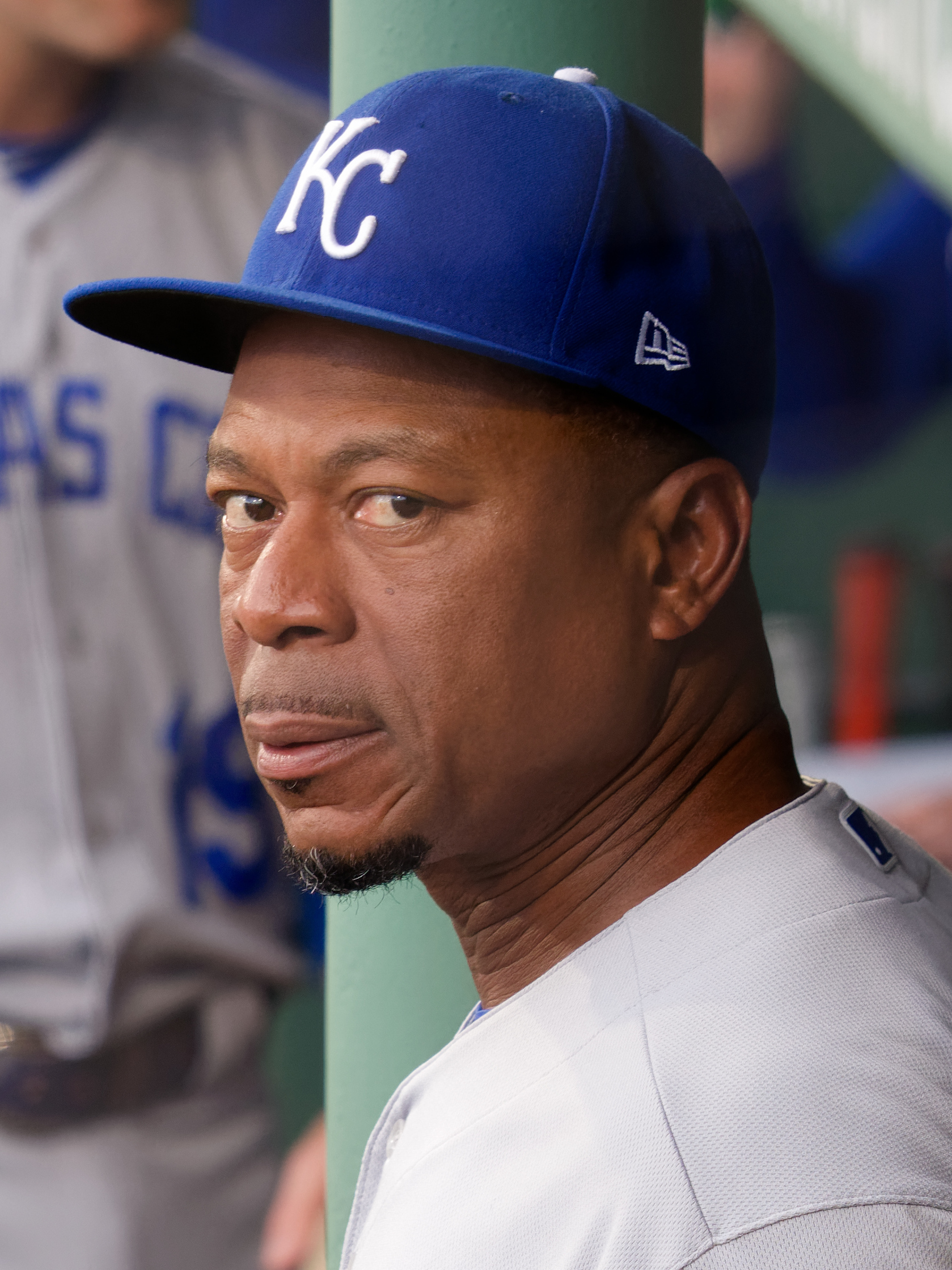
- Hollins with the Kansas City Royals in 2023

Kansas City Royals – No. 39
- Outfielder / Coach
- Born: June 12, 1974 (age 51); Fairfield, California, U.S.
- Batted: Right Threw: Left

Professional debut
- MLB: April 24, 1998, for the Atlanta Braves
- NPB: 2007, for the Yomiuri Giants

Last appearance
- MLB: October 1, 2006, for the Tampa Bay Devil Rays
- NPB: 2007, for the Yomiuri Giants

MLB statistics
- Batting average: .242
- Home runs: 28
- Runs batted in: 86

NPB statistics
- Batting average: .257
- Home runs: 12
- Runs batted in: 45
- Stats at Baseball Reference

Teams
- Atlanta Braves (1998); Los Angeles Dodgers (1998); Atlanta Braves (2004); Tampa Bay Devil Rays (2005–2006); Yomiuri Giants (2007); As Coach: Kansas City Royals (2020, 2022–present)

Damon Jamall Hollins (born June 12, 1974) is an American former professional baseball outfielder and current coach. Hollins played in Major League Baseball (MLB) for the Atlanta Braves, Los Angeles Dodgers, and Tampa Bay Devil Rays. His only regular major league playing time was in Tampa Bay, where he manned all three outfield positions. He is currently the first base coach for the Kansas City Royals.

== Early life ==
Hollins was born in Fairfield, California and grew up near Oakland–Alameda County Coliseum where he attended Oakland Athletics games as a child. He was the oldest child of his mother, Deborah Watson.

In 1991, Hollins played in the PONY Baseball and Softball Palomino World Series.

Hollins played baseball for Vallejo High School in Vallejo, California. He was drafted by the Atlanta Braves in the fourth round of the 1992 MLB draft.

== Professional career ==
Hollins began his professional career in the Gulf Coast League in 1992, the day after his high school graduation. In 1993, Baseball America ranked Hollins the best prospect in the Appalachian League.

Hollins made his Major League debut on April 24, 1998 at Turner Field, recording a hit against Brian Anderson of the Arizona Diamondbacks. He appeared in three games for the Braves that season before being traded to the Los Angeles Dodgers on September 9, 1998.

From 1999 to 2003, Hollins played in the minor league systems of the Cincinnati Reds, Milwaukee Brewers, Minnesota Twins and Braves. He briefly returned to the major leagues with the Braves in 2004. In 2005 and 2006, Hollins saw regular playing time for the first time in his career after joining the Tampa Bay Devil Rays.

On Mother's Day, May 14, 2006, Hollins was one of more than 50 hitters who brandished a pink bat to benefit the Susan G. Komen for the Cure.

On December 27, 2006, he signed with the Yomiuri Giants of Nippon Professional Baseball for the 2007 season. Hollins played in 124 games, batted .257 with 12 home runs (two of which were game-ending) and 45 RBI.

After playing in the Kansas City Royals organization in 2008, Hollins signed a minor league contract with the Philadelphia Phillies in January 2009, but was released during spring training.

On December 22, 2009, Hollins signed a minor league contract with the Kansas City Royals.

== Coaching career ==
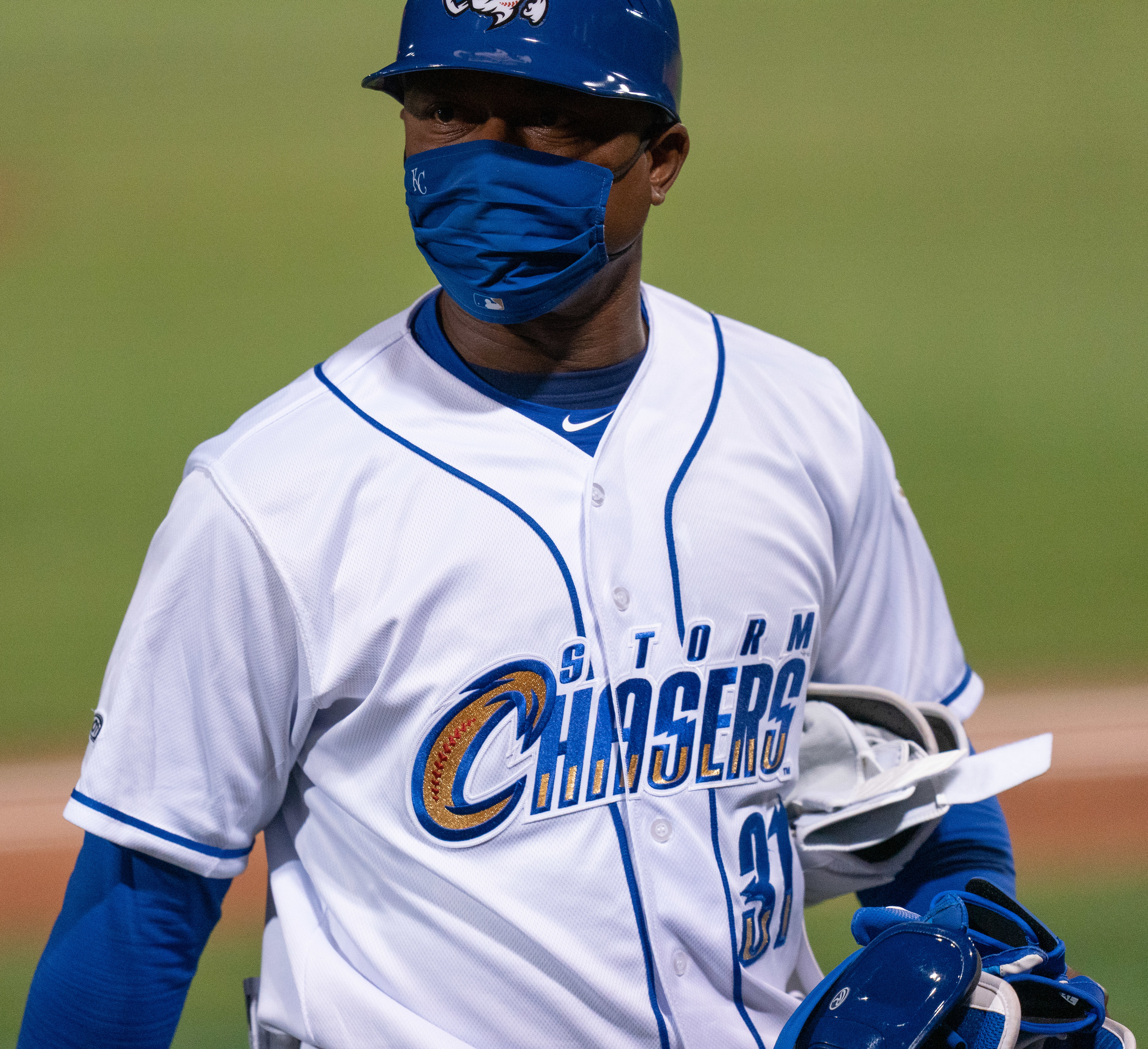
Hollins with the Omaha Storm Chasers in 2021

Hollins became the hitting coach of the Burlington Royals in 2010. In 2011, he served as a coach with the Kane County Cougars. In 2012, he served as a coach with the Wilmington Blue Rocks. In 2013, Hollins was named the hitting coach of the Idaho Falls Chukars. He served in that role for two years before joining the Lexington Legends as a hitting coach in 2015. In 2019, in addition to serving as a coach for the Chukars, he was named an outfield, base running and bunting coordinator for the Kansas City Royals organization.

Prior to the 2020 season, Hollins was named the first base coach of the Royals, replacing Rusty Kuntz who opted out of the season due to COVID-19 concerns. When Kuntz returned to the team for the 2021 season, Hollins resumed his role as a minor league instructor. In November 2021, Hollins was named first base coach for the Royals for the 2022 season.

== Personal life ==
In July 2006, Hollins' then-fiancée, Patrice, gave birth to their first child, a daughter named Tahari. As of 2016, he and Patrice were married and living in Litchfield Park, Arizona with their three children.
