= Tomás Pérez =

Venezuelan baseball player and coach (born 1973)

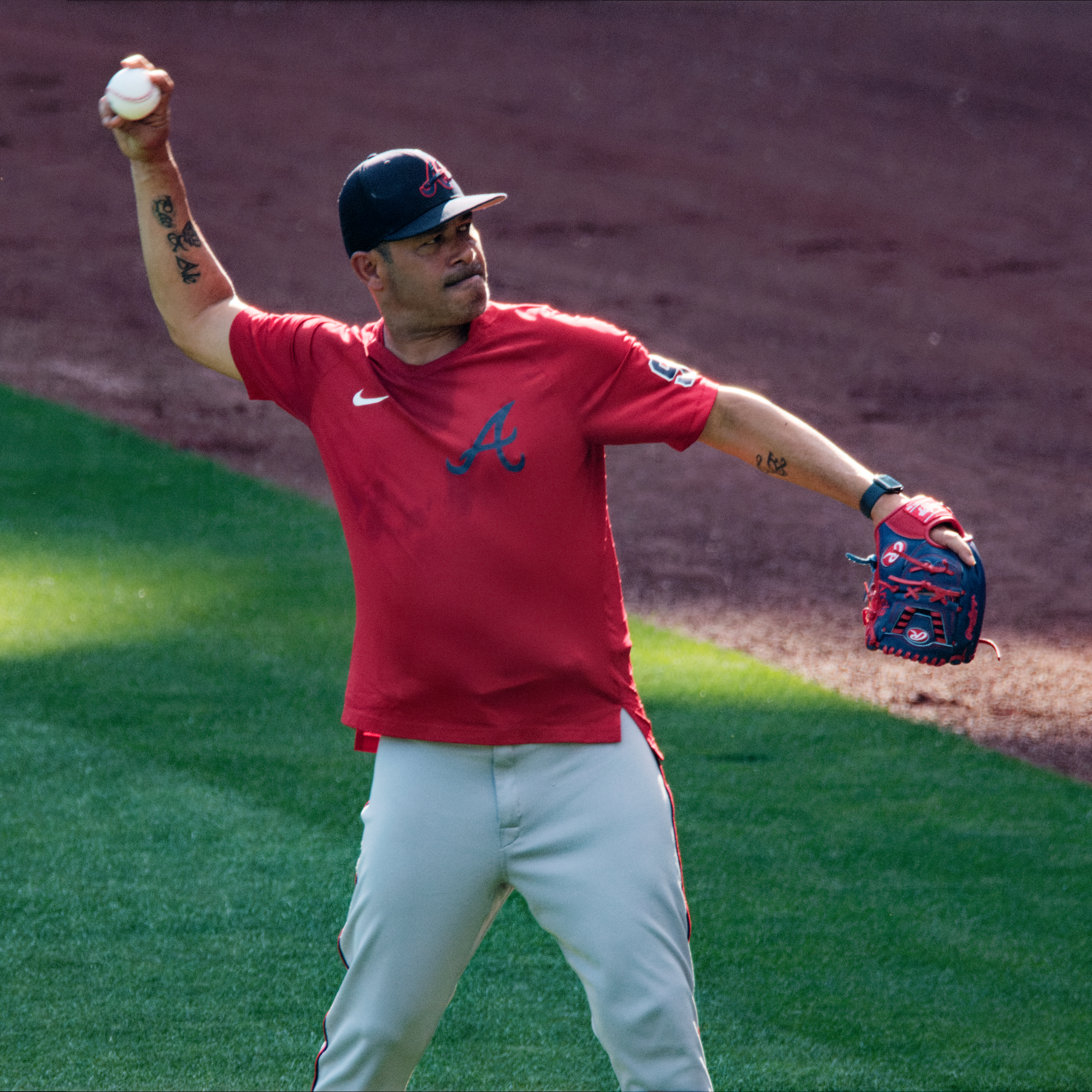
- Pérez with the Braves in 2022

Atlanta Braves – No. 98
- Infielder
- Born: December 29, 1973 (age 52); Barquisimeto, Lara State, Venezuela
- Batted: Switch Threw: Right

MLB debut
- May 3, 1995, for the Toronto Blue Jays

Last MLB appearance
- April 21, 2008, for the Houston Astros

MLB statistics
- Batting average: .240
- Home runs: 24
- Runs batted in: 180
- Stats at Baseball Reference

Teams
- As player: Toronto Blue Jays (1995–1998); Philadelphia Phillies (2000–2005); Tampa Bay Devil Rays (2006); Houston Astros (2008); As coach: Atlanta Braves (2020–present)

Career highlights and awards
- World Series champion (2021)

Member of the Venezuelan

Baseball Hall of Fame
- Induction: 2026
- Vote: 75%
- Election method: Contemporary Committee

Tomás Orlando Pérez Garcia (born December 29, 1973) is a Venezuelan former professional baseball infielder and current batting practice pitcher for the Atlanta Braves of Major League Baseball (MLB). Pérez was a utility infielder who throws right-handed and switch hits.

Before landing in Philadelphia in 2000, Pérez had played for the Toronto Blue Jays from 1995 to 1998, where he was selected under the provisions of the Rule 5 draft. He has also played for the Tampa Bay Devil Rays and the Houston Astros at the MLB level. Pérez is considered to be versatile because of his ability to play all four infield positions.

== Professional career ==
Pérez had his best year in 2003. Shifted between third base, second base, first base, shortstop, right field, and also as an emergency pitcher, Pérez was an asset off the bench. Known for throwing shaving cream pies, Pérez was a popular player with both fans and teammates alike in his six years in Philadelphia.

Despite being signed through 2006, Pérez was released by the Phillies on April 2, 2006; he signed a contract with the Tampa Bay Devil Rays on April 6. On Mother's Day, May 14, Pérez was one of more than 50 hitters who brandished a pink bat to benefit the Breast Cancer Foundation. In 2006, he became the fourth player in Tampa Bay history to have four extra-base hits in a game, a feat that wasn't again matched by a Rays player until Sam Fuld did so on April 12, 2011.

On May 30, 2007, Pérez was traded from the Los Angeles Dodgers to the Chicago White Sox in exchange for Dwayne Pollok. Through 2008, Pérez was a .240 hitter with 24 home runs and 180 RBI in 789 games. On November 22, 2007, Pérez signed a minor league contract with the Houston Astros that included an invitation to spring training. He was added to the 25-man roster by the end of spring training. Pérez played eight games in the majors for Houston and became a free agent at the end of the season.

Pérez signed with the Colorado Rockies in March 2009 but was released by the organization a month later.

On February 9, 2011, Pérez signed a one-year contract with BBC Grosseto of the Italian Baseball League, but he was waived on March 6 due to an elbow injury.

== Coaching career ==
On March 27, 2018, Pérez was hired to serve as the infield coach for the Florida Fire Frogs, the High-A affiliate of the Atlanta Braves.

== See also ==
- List of Major League Baseball players from Venezuela
