= Pinecrest High School =

American public school in North Carolina

Location
- 250 Voit Gilmore Lane; Southern Pines, North Carolina 28387; United States; 35°11′17″N 79°26′02″W

Information
- Type: Public 4-year
- Established: 1969 (57 years ago)
- CEEB code: 343670
- Principal: Matthew McLean
- Faculty: 106.73 (FTE)
- Enrollment: 2,310 (2023-2024)
- Student to teacher ratio: 21.64
- Colors: Green and gold
- Athletics: NCHSAA 8A
- Athletics conference: Mid-South 7A/8A
- Mascot: Patriots
- Newspaper: The Patriot
- Yearbook: Spectrum
- Website: pchs.ncmcs.org

Pinecrest High School (PHS) is a high school located in Southern Pines, North Carolina, United States, built in 1969. It is one of three high schools in the Moore County School District.

Pinecrest High School is ranked 105th within North Carolina. Students are able to take Advanced Placement coursework and exams; the AP participation rate is 40%. The total minority enrollment is 38% and 24% of students are economically disadvantaged..

== History ==
Pinecrest High School opened in 1969, following the consolidation of seven high schools in southern Moore County and the merger of three administrative school units.

On September 3, 1969, Pinecrest opened to its initial intake of around 1,600 students. Rather than the traditional six-period day, their schedules were divided into 21 blocks called mods.

When the school opened, its physical plant consisted of three two-story classroom buildings. In the spring of 1974, the music program moved into the newly completed music building. In the fall of 1974, Pinecrest played its first homecoming game on its own athletic field. A new gymnasium was opened in 1975. The school finished construction of the major facilities on February 15, 1976. In addition to the classroom building, a music building, a cafeteria, a gymnasium and a football field, the plant included a baseball field, tennis courts, a student common building, and paved parking areas.

Pinecrest offered an IB Diploma track until 2009, when the program was cancelled due to budgetary concerns and lack of student interest.

On March 14, 2020, North Carolina Governor Roy Cooper closed all schools March 16 through May 16 due to the COVID-19 pandemic. On April 25, he closed all schools for the rest of the school year. In June 2020, he announced a plan for all students to go back to school, around half on Monday and Tuesday, and the other half on Thursday and Friday, while Wednesday was used to sanitize. On March 12, 2021, Moore County Schools announced resumption of five-day-a-week classes.

== Campus ==
Pinecrest is composed of nine buildings. Pinecrest's buildings 1–3 are the original buildings that were built in 1969. Building 4 is a more recent building that connects with the cafeteria and gym. Building 9 is the newest building, completed before the second semester of the 2006–07 school year. Pinecrest has a gymnasium along with a field house that houses the Home and Visitors locker rooms for its athletic teams. The Butler building houses a room for PC's Exceptional Education program. The R.E. Lee Auditorium is located on the west side of the school and houses the school's music ensembles.

== The Patriot ==
The Patriot, Pinecrest's school paper, was published from the school's founding in 1969 until 2016.

Pinecrest High School courtyard during homecoming week 2008

== Athletics ==
Pinecrest High School is a member of the North Carolina High School Athletic Association (NCHSAA) and are classified as a 8A school. They are a part of the Mid-South 7A/8A Conference. The school colors are green and gold, and its team name is the Patriots.

The John Williams Athletic Complex (a former athletic director and football coach at Pinecrest), includes a lighted 4,500 seat football/soccer stadium and an eight lane track. A planned renovation for the summer of 2010 was the resurfacing of the field with artificial turf.

The John Williams Baseball Field which is lighted and seats 500. (The new stadium has been completed. Future additions include an enclosed press box, a snack bar, and a new storage building).

The James Moore Gymnasium is the home of basketball, volleyball, and wrestling, and seats 1,400.

The remainder of the athletic facilities includes a lighted softball field, which seats 250; a practice football field, a practice soccer field, a lighted ROTC practice area (turned into parking lot before the 2007–08 school year), and six hard court tennis courts. There are many trails through the woods behind the school which are used by the cross country and track teams.

=== Baseball ===
The Pinecrest baseball team won the NCHSAA 4A state championship in 1979.

=== Cross country ===
The Pinecrest men's cross country team won the NCHSAA 4A state championship in 2004, and was runner-up to Chapel Hill High School by one point in 2005.

=== Track and field ===
The Pinecrest women's outdoor track team won the 1979 NCHSAA all classification state championship. The men's outdoor track team tied for the NCHSAA 4A state championship in 1998.

=== Wrestling ===
In 2012, the Pinecrest wrestling team won the NCHSAA 4A state tournament team championship, beating out Parkland High School, who had won five straight state tournament championships, for the state title.

=== Golf ===
The Pinecrest men's golf team were the NCHSAA 4A state champions in 2008, 2013, 2015, 2016, 2017, 2021, 2023, 2024 and 2025.

The men's golf team posted a team score of 562 at the 2024 NCHSAA 4A state championships, setting the NCHSAA team record for lowest score.

The Pinecrest women's golf team were the NCHSAA all classes state champions in 1987 and 2001, and the 4A state champions in 2016, 2019, 2022, 2023 and 2024. The women's golf team were the 8A state champions in 2025.

== Notable alumni ==
- James Baldwin, former MLB pitcher and All-Star selection in 2000
- James L. Boles Jr., member of the North Carolina House of Representatives
- Jeff Capel II, college basketball head coach and NBA assistant coach
- Bobby Collins, college basketball head coach
- Henry Douglas, former American football wide receiver
- Charlie Engle, ultramarathon runner and author
- Seth Maness, former MLB pitcher for the Saint Louis Cardinals and Kansas City Royals
- Dillon Maples, MLB pitcher for the Chicago Cubs
- Steve Marshall, attorney general of Alabama
- Richard T. Morgan, former member of the North Carolina General Assembly
