= Firleigh Farms =

Historic house in North Carolina, United States

- U.S. National Register of Historic Places
- Location within North Carolina Location within the United States
- Location: 252 Fir Leigh Rd., near Southern Pines, North Carolina
- Coordinates: 35°10′16″N 79°21′17″W
- Area: 25.33 acres (10.25 ha)
- Built: 1923-1924
- Architectural style: Colonial Revival
- NRHP reference No.: 14000229
- Added to NRHP: May 19, 2014

Firleigh Farms is a historic equine and fox hunting estate located near Southern Pines, Moore County, North Carolina. Firleigh was built in 1923–1924, and is a two-story, Colonial Revival style frame dwelling. It consists of a five-bay main block and a two-story ell forming an L-shaped plan. It was built as a winter-season hunting box for Augustine Healy and his wife, Jeanette Reid Healy. Also on the property is a contributing three-vehicle garage/servants's quarters.

It was added to the National Register of Historic Places in 2014.
