= Winant Sidle =

United States Army general

- Born: 7 September 1916; Springfield, Ohio, US
- Died: 15 March 2005 (aged 88); Southern Pines, North Carolina, US
- Burial place: Arlington National Cemetery
- Military career
- Allegiance: United States of America
- Branch: United States Army
- Service years: 1940–1975
- Rank: Major General
- Conflicts: World War II; Korean War; Vietnam War

Winant Sidle (September 7, 1916, in Springfield, Ohio – March 15, 2005, in Southern Pines, North Carolina) was a major general in the United States Army.

== Biography ==
Sidle was born on September 7, 1916, in Springfield, Ohio, and was raised in Lansdowne, Pennsylvania. He graduated from Hamilton College in 1938 and obtained a master's degree in journalism from the University of Wisconsin-Madison in 1949. Sidle married Anne Brown in 1942. They had five children. He died on March 15, 2005, in Southern Pines, North Carolina, and is interred with Anne at Arlington National Cemetery.

== Career ==
Sidle originally joined the Pennsylvania Army National Guard in 1940. During World War II, he served in a number of battles, including Operation Shingle. Following the war, he joined the regular Army and served in the Korean War. During the Vietnam War, he was the Chief of Information for the Army in Saigon from 1967 to 1969 before becoming the Chief of Information for the Army from 1969 to 1973. He was Deputy Assistant Secretary of Defense for Public Affairs from 1974 until his retirement the following year.
