= 2000 Major League Baseball All-Star Game =

2000 American baseball competition

	1	2	3	4	5	6	7	8	9	R	H	E
American League	0	0	1	2	0	0	0	0	3	6	10	2
National League	0	0	1	0	1	0	0	0	1	3	9	2
- Date: July 11, 2000
- Venue: Turner Field
- City: Atlanta, Georgia
- Managers: Joe Torre (NYY); Bobby Cox (ATL)
- MVP: Derek Jeter (NYY)
- Attendance: 51,323
- Ceremonial first pitch: Hank Aaron
- Television: NBC (United States); MLB International (International)
- TV announcers: Bob Costas and Joe Morgan (NBC); Gary Thorne and Ken Singleton (MLB International)
- Radio: ESPN
- Radio announcers: Charley Steiner and Dave Campbell

The 2000 Major League Baseball All-Star Game was the 71st playing of the midsummer classic between the all-stars of the American League (AL) and National League (NL), the two leagues comprising Major League Baseball. The game was held on July 11, 2000 at Turner Field in Atlanta, Georgia, home of the Atlanta Braves of the National League.

The result of the game was the American League defeating the National League by a score of 6–3. The game is remembered for Chipper Jones' home run off James Baldwin. This was also the most recent MLB All-Star Game to be broadcast on NBC. Brandy sang "The Star-Spangled Banner", while Canadian singer Chantal Kreviazuk sang "O Canada".

== Venue selection ==
The Florida Marlins were originally awarded the 2000 All-Star Game in July 1995, but due to concerns over the chronically low attendance figures at Pro Player Stadium and the long-term viability of the South Florida market, National League president Len Coleman revoked the game from Miami in December 1998. The Marlins finally got to host the 2017 All-Star Game.

Coleman announced Atlanta would be the replacement host of the game, giving the Braves the chance to host their first All-Star Game since the 1972 edition. Turner Field, which opened in 1997, played a factor in Coleman's decision to award the game to Atlanta, citing Major League Baseball's desire to have the All-Star Game played in newer venues as a way to showcase the ballparks. This was the only All-Star Game to be played at Turner Field, as the Braves left for Truist Park at the end of the 2016 season.

== Rosters ==
Players in italics have since been inducted into the National Baseball Hall of Fame.

=== American League ===
Elected starters
Position	Player	Team	All-Star Games
C	Iván Rodríguez	Rangers	9
1B	Jason Giambi	Athletics	1
2B	Roberto Alomar	Indians	11
3B	Cal Ripken Jr.	Orioles	18
SS	Alex Rodriguez	Mariners	3
OF	Jermaine Dye	Royals	1
OF	Manny Ramirez	Indians	4
OF	Bernie Williams	Yankees	4

Pitchers
Position	Player	Team	All-Star Games
P	James Baldwin	White Sox	1
P	Chuck Finley	Indians	5
P	Tim Hudson	Athletics	1
P	Jason Isringhausen	Athletics	1
P	Todd Jones	Tigers	1
P	Derek Lowe	Red Sox	1
P	Pedro Martínez	Red Sox	5
P	Mariano Rivera	Yankees	3
P	Aaron Sele	Mariners	2
P	David Wells	Blue Jays	3

Reserves
Position	Player	Team	All-Star Games
C	Jorge Posada	Yankees	1
1B	Carlos Delgado	Blue Jays	1
1B	Fred McGriff	Devil Rays	5
1B	Mike Sweeney	Royals	1
2B	Ray Durham	White Sox	2
3B	Tony Batista	Blue Jays	1
3B	Travis Fryman	Indians	5
3B	Troy Glaus	Angels	1
SS	Mike Bordick	Orioles	1
SS	Nomar Garciaparra	Red Sox	3
SS	Derek Jeter	Yankees	3
OF	Darin Erstad	Angels	2
OF	Carl Everett	Red Sox	1
OF	Matt Lawton	Twins	1
OF	Magglio Ordóñez	White Sox	2
DH	Edgar Martínez	Mariners	5

- Baltimore Orioles 3B Cal Ripken Jr. was selected to start by the fans but unable to play due to injury.
- Seattle Mariners SS Alex Rodriguez was selected to start by the fans but unable to play due to a head injury.
- Cleveland Indians RF Manny Ramírez was selected to start by the fans but unable to play due to injury.

=== National League ===
Elected starters
Position	Player	Team	All-Star Games
C	Mike Piazza	Mets	8
1B	Mark McGwire	Cardinals	12
2B	Jeff Kent	Giants	2
3B	Chipper Jones	Braves	4
SS	Barry Larkin	Reds	11
OF	Barry Bonds	Giants	9
OF	Ken Griffey Jr.	Reds	11
OF	Sammy Sosa	Cubs	4

Pitchers
Position	Player	Team	All-Star Games
P	Kevin Brown	Dodgers	5
P	Ryan Dempster	Marlins	1
P	Tom Glavine	Braves	7
P	Danny Graves	Reds	1
P	Trevor Hoffman	Padres	3
P	Randy Johnson	Diamondbacks	7
P	Darryl Kile	Cardinals	3
P	Al Leiter	Mets	2
P	Greg Maddux	Braves	8
P	Shane Reynolds	Astros	1
P	Bob Wickman	Brewers	1

Reserves
Position	Player	Team	All-Star Games
C	Joe Girardi	Cubs	1
C	Jason Kendall	Pirates	3
C	Mike Lieberthal	Phillies	2
1B	Todd Helton	Rockies	1
1B	Andrés Galarraga	Braves	5
2B	Edgardo Alfonzo	Mets	1
2B	José Vidro	Expos	1
SS	Édgar Rentería	Cardinals	2
3B	Jeff Cirillo	Rockies	2
OF	Jim Edmonds	Cardinals	2
OF	Steve Finley	Diamondbacks	2
OF	Brian Giles	Pirates	1
OF	Vladimir Guerrero	Expos	2
OF	Jeffrey Hammonds	Rockies	1
OF	Andruw Jones	Braves	1
OF	Gary Sheffield	Dodgers	6

- New York Mets C Mike Piazza was selected to start by the fans but unable to play due to injury.
- St. Louis Cardinals 1B Mark McGwire was selected to start by the fans but unable to play due to injury.
- San Francisco Giants LF Barry Bonds was selected to start by the fans but unable to play due to a thumb injury.
- Cincinnati Reds CF Ken Griffey, Jr. was selected to start by the fans but unable to play due to injury, but did participate in the home run derby. He did not attend the All-Star Game.

== Game ==
=== Umpires ===
Home Plate	Mike Reilly
First Base	Mark Hirschbeck
Second Base	Wally Bell
Third Base	Paul Schrieber
Left Field	Brian O'Nora
Right Field	Laz Díaz

=== Starting lineups ===
American League				National League			
Order	Player	Team	Position	Order	Player	Team	Position
1	Roberto Alomar	Indians	2B	1	Barry Larkin	Reds	SS
2	Derek Jeter	Yankees	SS	2	Chipper Jones	Braves	3B
3	Bernie Williams	Yankees	CF	3	Vladimir Guerrero	Expos	LF
4	Jason Giambi	Athletics	1B	4	Sammy Sosa	Cubs	RF
5	Carl Everett	Red Sox	LF	5	Jeff Kent	Giants	2B
6	Iván Rodríguez	Rangers	C	6	Andrés Galarraga	Braves	1B
7	Jermaine Dye	Royals	RF	7	Jim Edmonds	Cardinals	CF
8	Travis Fryman	Indians	3B	8	Jason Kendall	Pirates	C
9	David Wells	Blue Jays	P	9	Randy Johnson	Diamondbacks	P

=== Game summary ===
Tuesday, July 11, 2000 8:35 pm (EDT) at Turner Field in Atlanta, Georgia
Team	1	2	3	4	5	6	7	8	9	R	H	E
American League	0	0	1	2	0	0	0	0	3	6	10	2
National League	0	0	1	0	1	0	0	0	1	3	9	2
WP: James Baldwin (1-0) LP: Al Leiter (0-1); Home runs: AL: None; NL: Chipper Jones (1)

The 2000 All-Star Game was one of the few occurrences in which the manager of the host team also managed the home team of the game, as Bobby Cox had led the Braves to the World Series the previous year, earning the right to manage the National League team in the All-Star Game.

== Home Run Derby ==
Turner Field, Atlanta—N.L. 41, A.L. 21
Player	Team	Round 1	Semis	Finals	Total
Sammy Sosa	Chicago (N)	6	11	9	26
Ken Griffey Jr.	Cincinnati	6	3	2	11
Carl Everett	Boston	6	6	–	12
Carlos Delgado	Toronto	5	1	–	6
Edgar Martínez	Seattle	2	–	–	2
Chipper Jones	Atlanta	2	–	–	2
Vladimir Guerrero	Montreal	2	–	–	2
Iván Rodríguez	Texas	1	–	–	1

Semifinals
1	Ken Griffey Jr.	3
4	Carlos Delgado	1
2	Carl Everett	6
3	Sammy Sosa	11

Finals
1	Ken Griffey Jr.	2
3	Sammy Sosa	9
