= Moore County Hunt Lands and Mile-Away Farms =

Historic farm in North Carolina, United States

- U.S. National Register of Historic Places
- U.S. Historic district
- Location within North Carolina Location within the United States
- Location: 1745 N. May St., near Southern Pines, North Carolina
- Coordinates: 35°11′14″N 79°22′00″W
- Area: 2,852 acres (1,154 ha)
- Built: 1929-1963
- Architect: Moss, William Ozelle; Delehanty, John Bradley Washington
- NRHP reference No.: 13000700
- Added to NRHP: September 9, 2013

Moore County Hunt Lands and Mile-Away Farms, also known as Mile-Away Farms, is a national historic district located near Southern Pines, Moore County, North Carolina. It encompasses 13 contributing buildings, 4 contributing sites, and 5 contributing structures on recreational hunt lands and an assemblage of equine farms and facilities near Southern Pines. They include the Moore County Hunt Lands (c. 1929–1963), a System of Fire Lanes (c. 1934) by the Civilian Conservation Corps, a System of Hunt Trails (c. 1929–1963), a System of Jumps and Fences (c. 1942–1963), a System of Earths (Man-made Fox Dens) (c. 1942–1963), Mile-Away Farms (c. 1942–1963), Mile-Away Farms (c. 1937–1963) including the Moss Residence, Brewster Barn Complex (c. 1948–1963), and The Paddock Jr. (c. 1950–1963).

It was added to the National Register of Historic Places in 2013.
