= Ruth Dean (landscape architect) =

Landscape architect

- Other name: Mrs. Aymar Embury

Ruth Bramley Dean (1889 - 1932) was a landscape architect at a time when it was difficult for women to work in the field. She laid out her ideas in her 1927 book The Livable House, Its Garden. Amongst her ideas she stressed the importance of linking the house and garden, placing the house in the context of sun, wind and outlook, and using native plants.

== Early life and education ==
Dean was born in Wilkes-Barre, Pennsylvania in November 1889. After graduating from Wilkes-Barr High School, she studied various subjects including botanical ecology and landscape gardening at the University of Chicago from 1908 until 1910. She left the university to work in the office of landscape architect, Jens Jensen. After a brief period working for Rand McNally, she moved to New York City and started her own office in 1915.

== Career ==
Dean is most known for her work designing private residential gardens. She particularly focused on making the landscape attractive, but remaining mindful that the garden must be an appropriate setting for the house. Her other projects included rooftop gardens and the grounds of the Knickerbocker Country Club, Tenafly, New Jersey. In 1929 Dean had 15 projects in her office and employed five women. In 1932, two of her gardens were included in a set of gardens exhibited by the American Society of Landscape Architects.

== Awards and honors ==
In 1921 she was elected to the American Society of Landscape Architects and in 1929 she was awarded the Gold Medal for Landscape Architecture of the Architectural League of New York, the first woman to do so. She received the award for three gardens she designed in Grosse Pointe, Michigan.

== Personal life ==
Dean worked on several projects with Aymar Embury II, whom she married in 1923. They had one daughter, Judith Dean Embury. Dean died on May 27, 1932.
