= Shaw House (Southern Pines, North Carolina) =

Historic house in North Carolina, United States

- U.S. National Register of Historic Places
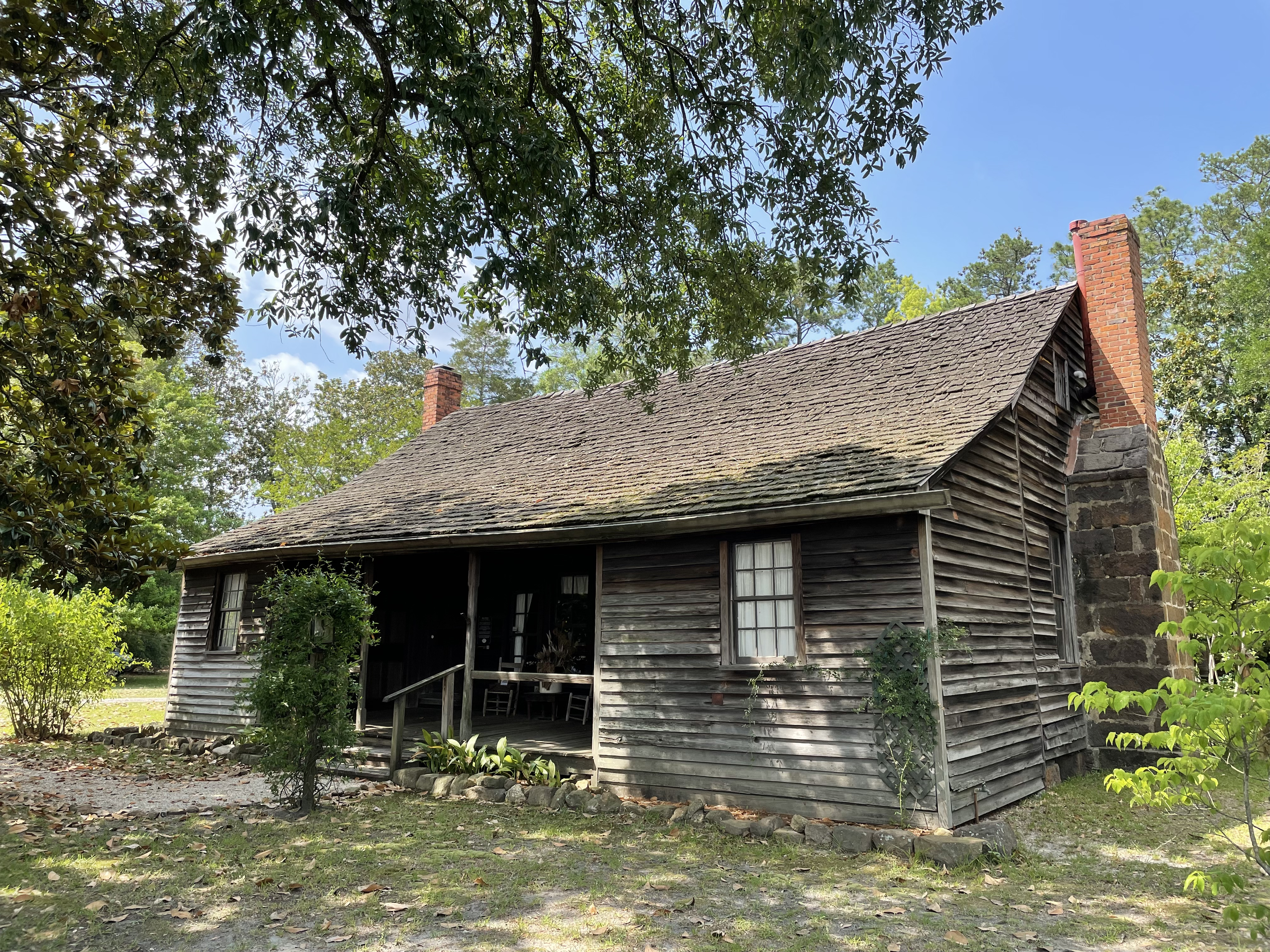

- Location within North Carolina Location within the United States
- Location: 780 SW. Broad St., near Southern Pines, North Carolina
- Coordinates: 35°10′5″N 79°24′6″W
- Area: 1.2 acres (0.49 ha)
- Built: 1842
- Architectural style: Vernacular, farmhouse
- NRHP reference No.: 93000542
- Added to NRHP: June 17, 1993

Shaw House, also known as the Old Shaw Homestead, is a historic home located near Southern Pines, Moore County, North Carolina.Dating back to the early 19th century, it is a 1 1/2-story, three-bay, frame dwelling that features design elements from the Federal and Greek Revival styles.

The house is notable for its massive, single-shoulder, dressed sandstone and brick end chimneys, a gable roof, and full-width engaged front porch. A rear ell was added in the late 19th or early 20th century. Shaw House is believed to be one of the oldest surviving houses in Moore County.

It was added to the National Register of Historic Places in 1993.
