= Nassau Club =

- Formation: 23 November 1889
- Founder: Woodrow Wilson
- Type: Private Club
- Members: 700 resident 800 non-resident (2006)
- Website: nassauclub.com
- Nassau Club
- U.S. Historic district – Contributing property
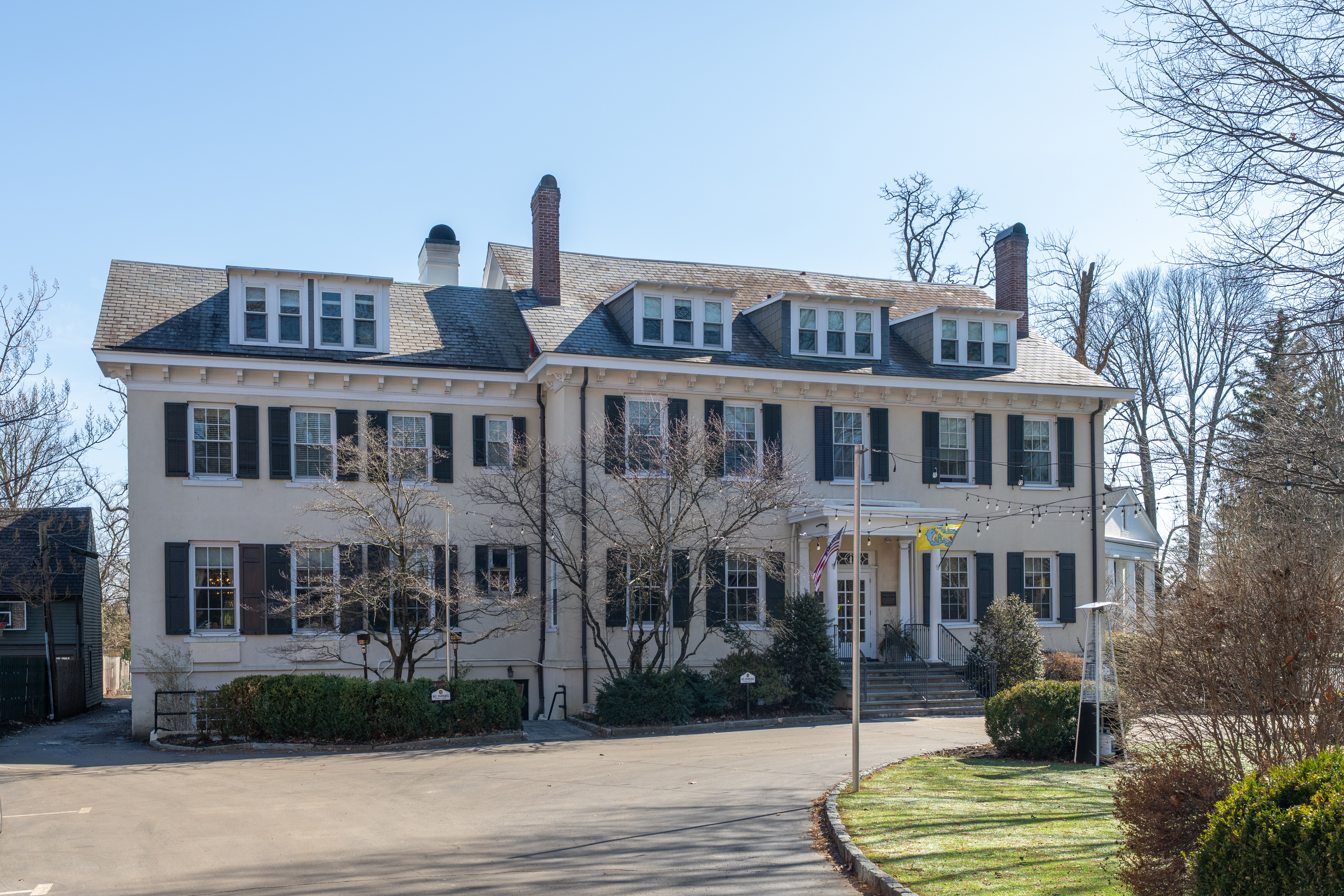

- Location within Mercer County, New Jersey
- Location: 6 Mercer Street, Princeton, NJ
- Coordinates: 40°20′52.5″N 74°39′48.3″W
- Built: 1813-14
- Architect: Aymar Embury II (1911)
- Part of: Princeton Historic District (ID75001143)
- Designated CP: 27 June 1975

The Nassau Club of Princeton, New Jersey, founded in 1889 by, among others, Woodrow Wilson as a town-and-gown club to bring the townspeople and the University faculty together, is now a private social club. It moved into its current location in 1903. The clubhouse was originally built in 1813-14 as the home of Samuel Miller, the second professor of the Princeton Theological Seminary, on land belonging to his father-in-law, Continental Congressman Jonathan Dickinson Sergeant. Sergeant had built a large house on the site shortly before the American Revolution but it was burned down during the British occupation prior to the Battle of Princeton.

The club is organized under United States laws for 501(c)(7) Social and Recreation Clubs. In 2024, it claimed total revenue of $3,603,929 and total assets of $6,108,657.

The club provides dining and social spaces, as well as guest rooms for visiting members. Originally formed as a men's club, it has allowed both male and female members for several decades. The clubhouse was expanded in 1911, by architect Aymar Embury II, and in 1969 a banquet dining room was added, with extensive renovations in 1992.

In popular culture, the Nassau Club was referenced in the lyrics of the 1981 hit song The American by Scottish rock group Simple Minds.

== Notable Members ==
- Grover Cleveland
- Woodrow Wilson
