= WEEB =

- Southern Pines, North Carolina; United States
- Frequency: 990 kHz

Programming
- Format: News/Talk
- Affiliations: Compass Media Networks; Premiere Networks; Salem Radio Network; Townhall News; Westwood One

Ownership
- Owner: Pinehurst Broadcasting

History
- First air date: August 8, 1947
- Former call signs: WSTS (1947–1950*); WEEB (1950–1982); WCEL (1982–1985)

Technical information
- Licensing authority: FCC
- Facility ID: 52643
- Class: D
- Power: 10,000 watts day 5,000 watts critical hours 30 watts night
- Translators: 97.3 W247CE (Southern Pines); 104.1 W281BZ (Southern Pines)

Links
- Public license information: Public file; LMS
- Webcast: Listen Live
- Website: weeb990.com

WEEB (990 AM) is a radio station licensed to Southern Pines, North Carolina, United States, broadcasting a news/talk format. The station is currently owned by Pinehurst Broadcasting Corporation.

== History ==
WEEB as it exists today was formed from the 1950 merger of two stations which started in the same year in the same town. The first station, WSTS, signed on at 990 kHz with 250 watts during the day, increased to 1,000 watts in December 1948. It was approved for operation by the Sandhills Broadcasting Corporation on March 27, 1947, going on the air on August 8. Just three months later, a second station went on the air in the same town. WEEB operated with 1,000 watts on 1360 kHz and programming from the Mutual Broadcasting System and was owned by Sandhills Community Broadcasters. WSTS sued WEEB before it launched for slander, claiming that WEEB officials made false statements to advertisers to dissuade them from purchasing air time on WSTS. However, after a management change at WSTS, the new operators opted not to pursue the lawsuit.

On December 1, 1950, the two stations consolidated with WEEB's programming and Mutual hookup on WSTS's studio and transmitter facilities, stripping Southern Pines (population 3,500) of its reported distinction as the smallest U.S. town with two radio stations; the owners of WSTS then purchased WWGP at nearby Sanford. WEEB increased power to 5,000 watts in 1959.

The station briefly held the call sign WCEL from 1982 to 1985 after the Southern Dandy Corporation purchased it from Sandhills, which was led by Jack S. Younts.

In 1990, after WSTS in Laurinburg changed from gospel music to Top 40, WEEB changed from "older and milder rock music" to gospel. Jerry Stout, the former WSTS program director and morning host, moved to those same positions at WEEB. The next year, Stephen Adams purchased the station from Richardson Broadcasting Group and converted it to a news/talk format.

Logo before 104.1 translator sign on

In 2016, WEEB added the first of two FM translators, W247CE (97.3 FM), to bring its signal to the FM band.
