= Michael G. Walsh =

Irish horseracing trainer

Michael Gerard Walsh (8 September 1906 – 16 August 1993) was an Irish Steeplechase trainer and founder of the Stoneybrook steeplechase in Southern Pines, North Carolina. Uncle of hall of fame jockey Thomas M. Walsh.

== Personal life ==
He was born in Kildorrery, County Cork, Ireland on 8 September 1906 to Thomas and Regina Walsh, owners of the Walsh Corner House Pub in Kildorrery. Walsh immigrated from Ireland to the United States in 1925 after a falling out with his father, Thomas. He died on 16 August 1993 at his home in Southern Pines after a 50 year career in the horse industry. Walsh is also related to famed Irish horse trainer Ted Walsh and his son, National Hunt Champion Ruby Walsh.

He is a member of the 1997 class of inductees to the National Museum of Racing and Hall of Fame.

== List of achievements ==
- Trainer of Steeplechase champion King Commander, 1954
- Leading race-winning steeplechase trainer, 1953–55
- Leading money-winning steeplechase trainer, 1953–54 and 1960
- Third steeplechase trainer to win $1 million
- Founder of the Stoneybrook Races in Southern Pines, N.C.

F. Ambrose Clark Award Inducted into national horse racing hall of fame 1997, saratoga springs ny 1977 inducted into north carolina sports hall of fame 1995 inducted into show horse hall of fame { only one in racing and show hall of fames}
