= James Baldwin (baseball) =

American baseball pitcher (born 1971)

- Pitcher
- Born: July 15, 1971 (age 55); Southern Pines, North Carolina, U.S.
- Batted: Right Threw: Right

MLB debut
- April 30, 1995, for the Chicago White Sox

Last MLB appearance
- September 29, 2005, for the Baltimore Orioles

MLB statistics
- Win–loss record: 79–74
- Earned run average: 5.01
- Strikeouts: 844
- Stats at Baseball Reference

Teams
- Chicago White Sox (1995–2001); Los Angeles Dodgers (2001); Seattle Mariners (2002); Minnesota Twins (2003); New York Mets (2004); Texas Rangers (2005); Baltimore Orioles (2005)

Career highlights and awards
- All-Star (2000)

James J. Baldwin, Jr. (born July 15, 1971) is an American former professional baseball pitcher. He played in Major League Baseball (MLB) for the Chicago White Sox, Los Angeles Dodgers, Seattle Mariners, Minnesota Twins, New York Mets, Texas Rangers and Baltimore Orioles. Baldwin batted and threw right-handed.

== Career ==
=== Playing career ===
Drafted by the Chicago White Sox in the fourth round of the 1990 MLB draft, Baldwin made his MLB debut on April 30, 1995, for the White Sox. In spring training of that same season, Baldwin was the first pitcher to face Michael Jordan, in an intrasquad game in spring training. In 2000, Baldwin made the All-Star Game as a member of the White Sox. He pitched the third inning of that game, giving up Chipper Jones' second hit of the game, that being the only home run of the night, which ignited a short-lived National League comeback. On January 24, 2006, Baldwin signed a minor league contract with the Toronto Blue Jays, but was released on April 22.

=== Coaching career ===
Baldwin served as the pitching coach for the baseball team at Pinecrest High School in Southern Pines, North Carolina. He joined the Cincinnati Reds organization and served as a rehabilitation coach at their Arizona complex from 2016 through 2019. He was named the pitching coach for the Louisville Bats prior to the 2020 season.

== Family ==
His son, James Baldwin III, a center fielder from Pinecrest High School, was drafted in the fourth round and signed in 2010 by the Los Angeles Dodgers.
