= James Boyd House =

Historic house in North Carolina, United States

- U.S. National Register of Historic Places
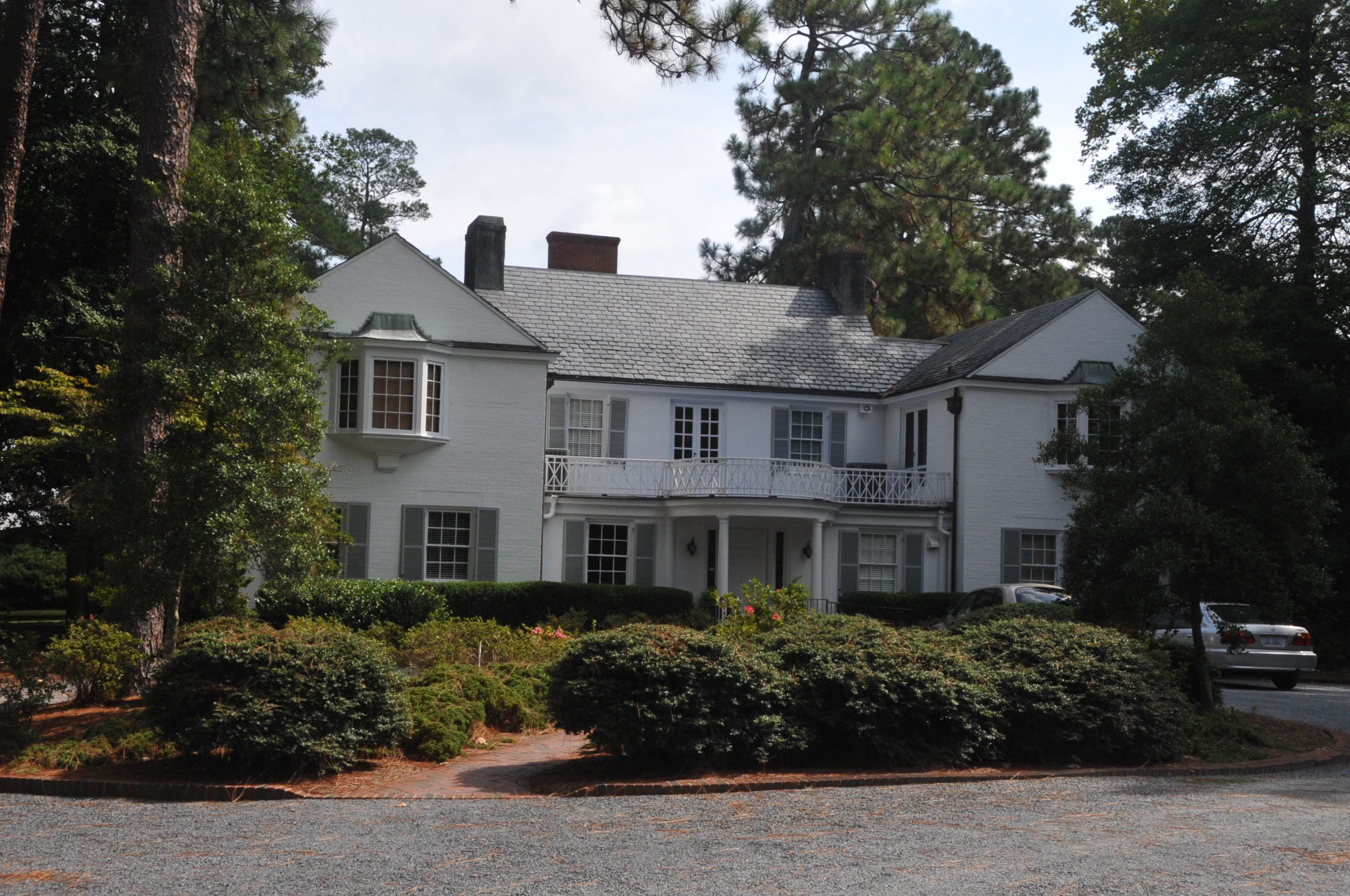
- James Boyd House, March 2007

- Location within North Carolina Location within the United States
- Location: Ridge Rd. and Connecticut Ave., Southern Pines, North Carolina
- Coordinates: 35°10′14″N 79°23′00″W
- Area: 40 acres (16 ha)
- Built: 1920
- Architect: Embry, Aymur
- Architectural style: Colonial Revival
- NRHP reference No.: 77001005
- Added to NRHP: May 12, 1977

James Boyd House, also known as Weymouth, is a historic home located at Southern Pines, Moore County, North Carolina. It was designed by architect Aymar Embury II and built in the 1920s. It is a large, rambling Colonial Revival style brick dwelling. It consists of a five-bay, two-story central block flanked by two-story hyphens and wings. It was built by historical novelist James Boyd after World War I. Since 1979, the building has housed the Weymouth Center for the Arts and Humanities.

It was added to the National Register of Historic Places in 1977.
