= Charlie Engle (marathoner) =

American ultramarathon runner and author

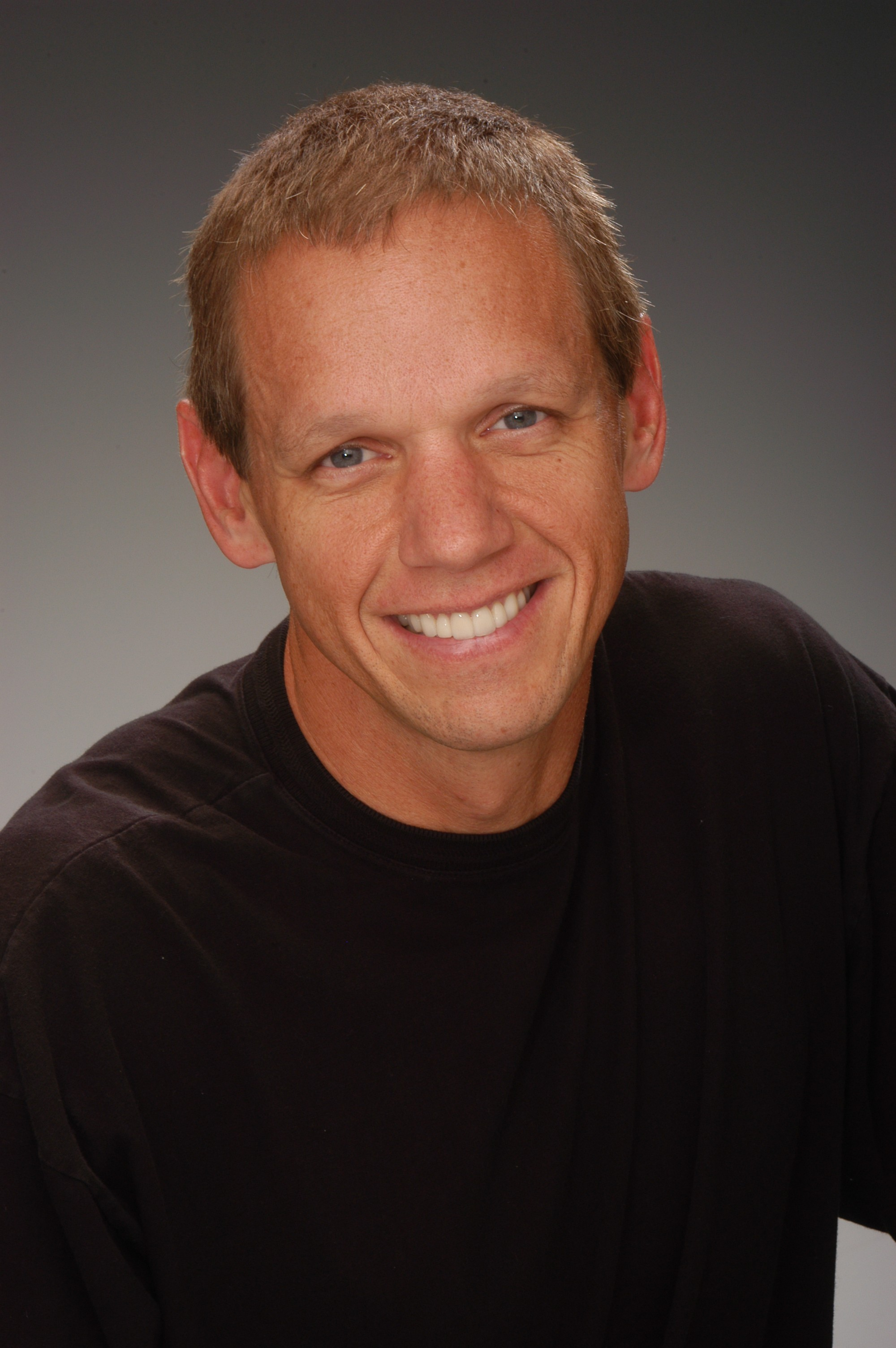
Charlie Engle

Charlie Engle (born September 20, 1962) is an American ultramarathon runner and author.

== Early life and education ==
Charlie Engle was born on September 20, 1962 to mother Rebecca Ranson and father Richard Engle. His parents were students at University of North Carolina at Chapel Hill (UNC) when Engle was born. In eighth grade, Engle ran one mile in under five minutes for the first time. After living in California for a time, he moved to Southern Pines, North Carolina with his father and stepmother in 1976 and began attending Pinecrest High School.

Engle enrolled in UNC but soon began to have problems with alcohol and cocaine, which caused him to falter in his academics. During Engle's junior year, his father, who was then living in Seattle, Washington came to pick Engle up after a concerned call from one of Engle's fraternity members. After departing UNC, Engle started to spiral, bouncing from job to job as he battled his addiction to drugs and alcohol.

In July 1992 while Engle was working in Wichita, Kansas, one of his cocaine binges ended with his car being shot at with a spray of bullets. Engle began regularly attending a local Alcoholics Anonymous meeting that day. He mentions that day as helping motivate him, stating to Runner's World: "That was my lowest low. The day when I woke up."

== Career ==
Engle started running marathons in 1989. His first was the Big Sur marathon, and he ran in several more marathons, including the Boston Marathon, before getting sober. Engle entered his first Ultramarathon by accident in Brisbane, Australia in 1996, thinking he was entering a shorter-distance event. He still managed to win the men's division and began entering endurance competitions around the world. After seeing an Eco-Challenge on the Discovery Channel, Engle registered to participate in one of the events. He described himself as a "documentary filmmaker" despite having limited experience, in the hopes that the statement would be self-fulfilling. When Engle was accepted into the Borneo Eco-Challenge, he was asked by CBS to shoot footage of the event for the series 48 Hours, which ended up using eleven minutes of footage that Engle shot. Following the Borneo challenge, Engle went on several weeks later to complete the annual Ironman Triathlon in Hawaii.

His camera work for 48 Hours helped Engle get a job as part of the camera crew for Extreme Makeover: Home Edition and eventually he became a producer for the show. During his time with the show, Engle continued doing work in car dent repair and continued competing in endurance events. The contacts he had developed in the entertainment industry from working on Extreme Makeover helped Engle get director James Moll to film a documentary of a 2007 run across the Sahara Desert. The Sahara run covered over 4,300 miles in 111 days. Engle published a memoir, Running Man, in 2016.

== Legal issues ==
In 2010, Engle was convicted of 12 counts of mortgage fraud, and served 16 months in federal prison in Beckley, West Virginia before being released to a halfway house.
