= Southern Pines, North Carolina =

- Town
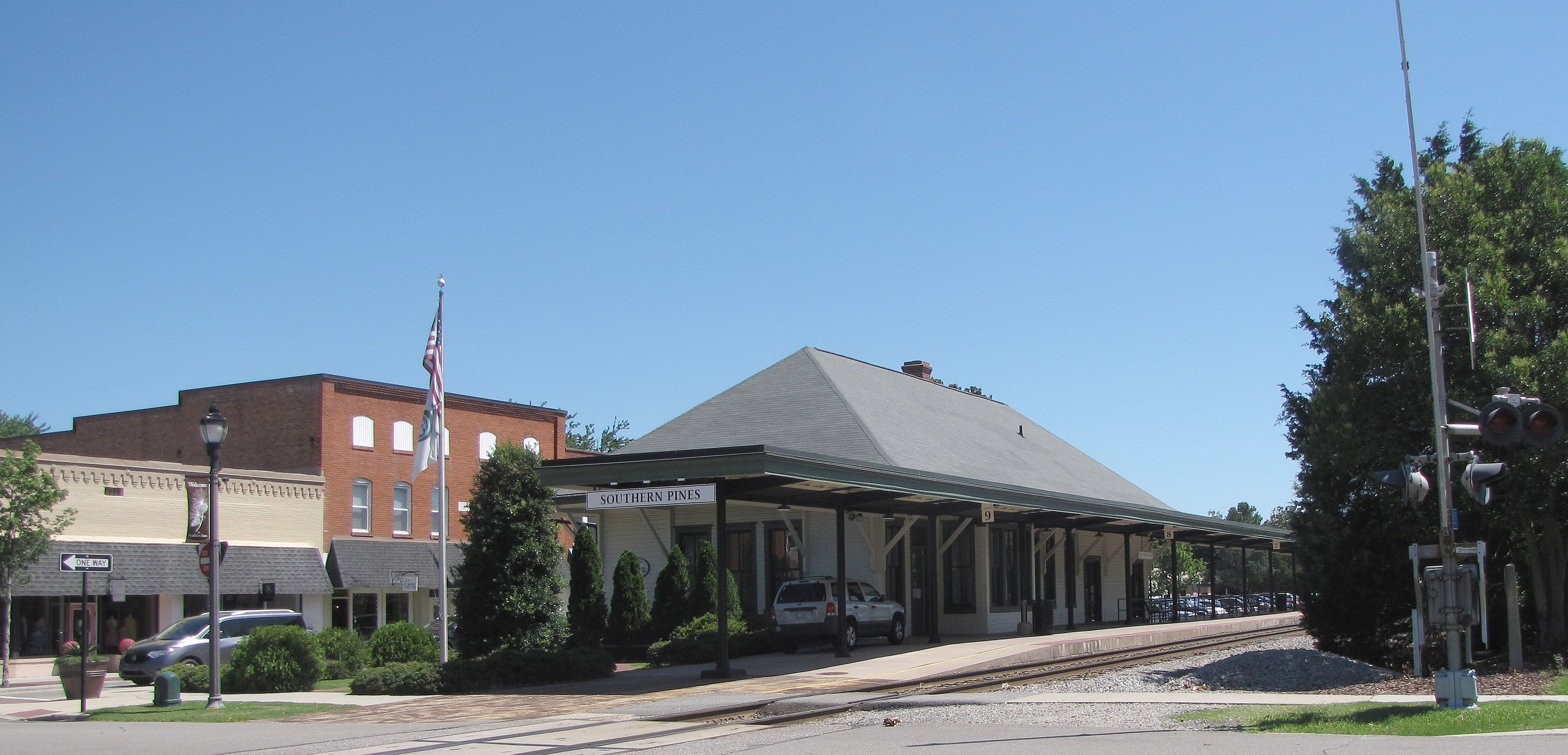
- Southern Pines train station

- Seal

- Location in Moore County (bottom) and the state of North Carolina (top)
- Coordinates: 35°11′36″N 79°24′14″W
- Country: United States
- State: North Carolina
- County: Moore
- Established: 1887
- Named for: Its location on the edge of the longleaf pine belt

Government
  - Mayor: Taylor Clement

Area
  - Town: 18.6 sq mi (48 km^{2})
  - Land: 18.4 sq mi (48 km^{2})
  - Water: 0.2 sq mi (0.52 km^{2})
- Elevation: 512 ft (156 m)

Population (2020)
  - Town: 15,545
  - Density: 846.4/sq mi (326.8/km^{2})
  - Urban: 50,319 (Pinehurst–Southern Pines) (US: 505th)
  - Urban density: 1,059.6/sq mi (409.1/km^{2})
- Time zone: UTC−5 (Eastern (EST))
  - Summer (DST): UTC−4 (EDT)
- ZIP Codes: 28387-28388 (Southern Pines); 28374 (Pinehurst); 28327 (Carthage)
- Area codes: 910, 472
- FIPS code: 37-63120
- GNIS feature ID: 2407374
- Website: www.southernpines.net

Southern Pines is a town in Moore County, North Carolina, United States. Its population was 15,545 as of the 2020 census, up from 12,334 in 2010.

== History ==
Founded as a winter health resort for Northerners, land for the establishment of a town was purchased in 1884 and the town was incorporated on March 7, 1887.

As of 1898, it was a sundown town where African Americans were not allowed to reside or conduct business.

The James Boyd House, Shaw House, Southern Pines Historic District, Firleigh Farms, and Moore County Hunt Lands and Mile-Away Farms are listed on the National Register of Historic Places. The Southern Pines Golf Club, one of Donald Ross' earliest courses, was founded in 1906.

== Geography ==
Southern Pines is in southern Moore County in the Sandhills Region of North Carolina. It is bordered to the south by Aberdeen, to the west by Pinehurst, and to the north by Carthage and Whispering Pines.

U.S. Route 1 (Sandhills Boulevard) is the primary road through Southern Pines, passing northwest of the downtown area. US-1 leads northeast 26 miles (42 km) to Sanford and southwest through Aberdeen 30 miles (48 km) to Rockingham. North Carolina Highway 2 has its eastern terminus in Southern Pines and leads west 5 miles (8 km) to the center of Pinehurst. NC 22 has its southern terminus in Southern Pines and leads north 11 miles (18 km) to Carthage, the Moore county seat.

According to the U.S. Census Bureau, the town of Southern Pines has a total area of 18.6 square miles (48 km^{2}), of which 0.2 sq mi (0.5 km^{2}), or 1.02%, is covered by water. The center of Southern Pines sits on high ground that drains west toward Aberdeen Creek, a south-flowing tributary of Drowning Creek (the Lumber River), and east and north toward tributaries of the Little River, part of the Cape Fear River watershed.

== Demographics ==
Historical population
Census	Pop.	Note	%±
1900	517		—
1910	542		4.8%
1920	743		37.1%
1930	2,524		239.7%
1940	3,225		27.8%
1950	4,272		32.5%
1960	5,198		21.7%
1970	5,937		14.2%
1980	8,620		45.2%
1990	9,129		5.9%
2000	10,918		19.6%
2010	12,334		13.0%
2020	15,545		26.0%
U.S. Decennial Census

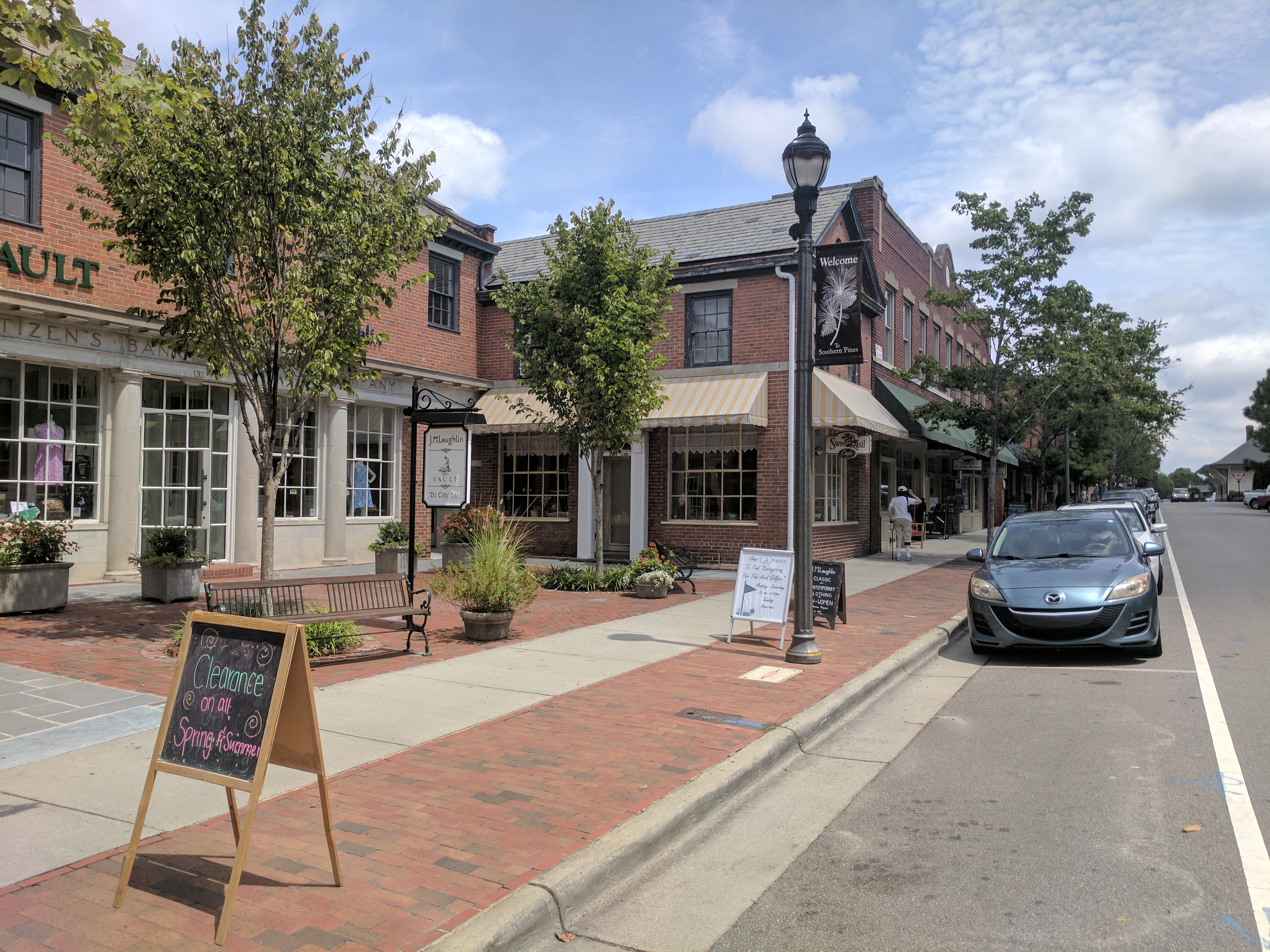
Shops along North Broad Street

=== 2020 census ===
As of the 2020 census, Southern Pines had a population of 15,545. The median age was 44.5 years. 19.0% of residents were under the age of 18 and 28.8% were 65 years of age or older. For every 100 females, there were 85.5 males, and for every 100 females age 18 and over, there were 82.5 males age 18 and over.

94.5% of residents lived in urban areas, while 5.5% lived in rural areas.

There were 7,322 households in Southern Pines, of which 22.5% had children under the age of 18 living in them. Of all households, 42.2% were married-couple households, 19.1% were households with a male householder and no spouse or partner present, and 34.6% were households with a female householder and no spouse or partner present. About 38.7% of all households were made up of individuals, and 20.4% had someone living alone who was 65 years of age or older.

There were 8,364 housing units, of which 12.5% were vacant. The homeowner vacancy rate was 2.1% and the rental vacancy rate was 11.6%.

Southern Pines racial composition
Race	Number	Percentage
White (non-Hispanic)	11,126	71.57%
Black or African American (non-Hispanic)	2,609	16.78%
Native American	64	0.41%
Asian	232	1.49%
Pacific Islander	13	0.08%
Other/multiracial	683	4.39%
Hispanic or Latino	818	5.26%

=== 2010 census ===
As of the 2010 census, 12,334 people, 5,866 households, and 3,304 families lived in the town. The population density was 806 inhabitants per square mile (311/km^{2}). The 6,859 housing units had an average density of 371 per square mile (143.24/km^{2}). The racial makeup of the town was 71.7% White, 24.0% African American, 0.6% Native American, 0.8% Asian, 0.1% Pacific Islander, 1.3% from other races, and 1.4% from two or more races. Hispanics or Latinos of any race were 1.4% of the population.

Of the 5,866 households, 21% had children under 18 living with them, 40.6% were married couples living together, 13% had a female householder with no husband present, 2.7 had a male householder with no female present, and 38.9% were not families. The average household size was 2.07 and the average family size was 2.75.

In the town, the age distribution was 21.9% 19 and younger, 4.7% from 20 to 24, 20.8% from 25 to 44, 25.2% from 45 to 64, and 27.5% who were 65 or older. The median age was 47. For every 100 females, there were 82 males. For every 100 females 18 and over, there were 78.2 males.

=== Income and poverty ===
The median income in 2011 in the town for a household was $41,297 and for a family was $60,683. Males had a median income of $29,855 versus $23,920 for females. The per capita income for the town was $30,886. Of families, 9.26% were below the poverty level, along with 12.4% of the population poverty line, including 23.0% of those under 18 and 9.6% of those 65 or over.

== Education ==
- Pinecrest High School
- Sandhills Community College
- North Moore High School
- Union Pines High School

== Media ==
- The Pilot
- PineStraw Magazine
- Moore County News
- WEEB Talk Radio 990 AM and 97.3 FM
- WIOZ Star 102.5 FM
- WMGU Magic 106.9 FM

The metro area has TV broadcasting stations that serve the Raleigh-Durham designated market area as defined by Nielsen Media Research.

== Infrastructure ==
- Camp Mackall, U.S. Army training facility
- Moore County Airport
- Southern Pines station, served by Amtrak

== Notable people ==
- James Baldwin, former All-Star pitcher for the Chicago White Sox
- P. T. Barnum, co-founder of Ringling Bros. and Barnum & Bailey Circus, built a home for his family in Southern Pines at 285 N. Bethesda Road.
- Peggy Kirk Bell, golf instructor and founding member of the LPGA
- Jeff Capel II, NBA assistant coach and college basketball head coach
- Bobby Collins, college basketball coach
- Sarah Dessen, novelist
- Denny Emerson, equestrian
- Charlie Engle, ultramarathon runner and author
- Augustus M. Gurney, U.S. Army brigadier general, retired in Southern Pines
- James Holshouser Jr., former Republican governor of North Carolina
- Patricia Hollingsworth Holshouser, former first lady of North Carolina
- Richard Hudson, U.S. representative
- Sandy Koufax, Hall of Fame pitcher for the Los Angeles Dodgers, owned a home in Southern Pines.
- Julien J. LeBourgeois, vice admiral of the United States Navy
- Carwood Lipton, member 101st Airborne Division in World War II, portrayed in Band of Brothers, spent his retirement years in Southern Pines.
- James Russell McGregor (James 3X Shabazz), a leader of the Nation of Islam and an associate of Malcolm X
- Armelia McQueen, actress
- D. Jeffrey Mims, artist and founder of Academy of Classical Design
- Shannon Moore, professional wrestler
- Richard T. Morgan, North Carolina state legislator, businessman, and farmer
- Winant Sidle, U.S. Army major general
- John Frank Stevens, railroad builder, discoverer of Stevens Pass, and lead engineer for the Panama Canal
- Michael Walsh, horse trainer, National Horse Racing Hall of Fame inductee, founder of the Stoneybrook Steeplechase
- Toni Lynn Washington, blues singer

== Sister city ==
Southern Pines has one sister city, as designated by Sister Cities International:

- Newry/Mourne, County Down, Northern Ireland, United Kingdom

== See also ==
- List of sundown towns in the United States

== Works cited ==
- Town of Southern Pines Comprehensive Long Range Plan (PDF), Town of Southern Pines, March 8, 2016
