= 2022 Chicago Cubs season =

2022 Chicago Cubs
- League: National League
- Division: Central
- Ballpark: Wrigley Field
- City: Chicago
- Record: 74–88 (.457)
- Divisional place: 3rd
- Owners: Tom Ricketts
- President of baseball operations: Jed Hoyer
- General managers: Carter Hawkins
- Managers: David Ross
- Television: Marquee Sports Network (Jon "Boog" Sciambi, Jim Deshaies, Taylor McGregor, Ryan Dempster, Elise Menaker, Rick Sutcliffe, Pat Hughes, Beth Mowins, Chris Myers, Cameron Maybin, Doug Glanville), Ron Coomer
- Radio: WSCR; Chicago Cubs Radio Network (Pat Hughes, Ron Coomer, Zach Zaidman, Matt Spiegel), Beth Mowins

The 2022 Chicago Cubs season was the 151st season of the Chicago Cubs franchise, the 147th in the National League, and the Cubs' 107th season at Wrigley Field. The Cubs were managed by David Ross, in his third year as Cubs manager as members of Major League Baseball's National League Central. The Cubs began the season at home against the Milwaukee Brewers on April 1 and finished the season on the road against the Cincinnati Reds on October 5. With their loss on September 17, the Cubs were officially eliminated from playoff contention for the second consecutive season. The Cubs finished the season 74–88, 19 games out of first place.

== Previous season ==
The Cubs finished the 2021 season 71–91 to finish in fourth place in the Central Division failing to make the playoffs for only the second time since 2014. The season also marked the first time since 2014 that the Cubs finished with a losing record and the first time since 2013 that the Cubs lost at least 91 games.

== Offseason ==
=== Front office changes ===
On October 15, 2021, the Cubs announced they had hired the assistant general manager for the Cleveland Guardians, Carter Hawkins, as the team's new general manager. On October 25, the club announced they had hired Ehsan Bokhari as assistant GM.

=== Coaching changes ===
On March 11, 2022, the Cubs announced that manager David Ross had signed a three-year contract extension through the 2024 season with an option for 2025.

Hitting coach Anthony Iapoce was fired following the season. Shortly thereafter, the team hired Tampa Bay minor league hitting coordinator Greg Brown as the new hitting coach. On November 15, 2021, the Cubs announced they had parted ways with associate pitching, catching, and strategy coach Mike Borzello. Additionally, assistant director Brad Mills departed the team. The team further named Daniel Moskos as the new assistant pitching coach. Johnny Washington was later named assistant hitting coach.

=== Lockout ===
The expiration of the league's collective bargaining agreement (CBA) with the Major League Baseball Players Association occurred on December 1, 2021 with no new agreement in place. As a result, the team owners voted unanimously to lockout the players stopping all free agency and trades.

The Cubs officially signed three players, including free agent pitcher Marcus Stroman, prior to the lockout being put in place.

On March 10, 2022, the MLB and MLBPA agreed to a new collective bargaining agreement, thus ending the lockout. Although MLB previously announced that several series would be canceled due to the lockout, the agreement provides for a 162-game season, with originally canceled games to be made up via doubleheaders.

=== Rule changes ===
Pursuant to the new CBA, several new rules were instituted for the 2022 season:

- the National League will adopt the designated hitter;
- a draft lottery will be implemented;
- the postseason will expand from 10 to 12 teams; and
- advertising patches will appear on player uniforms and helmets for the first time.

Due to the shortened season as a result of the lockout, MLB instituted temporary rules for the 2022 season including increasing roster size to 28 through May 1 and starting extra innings with a runner on second base.

=== Transactions ===
==== October 2021 ====
October 5	Activated C Robinson Chirinos, C Willson Contreras, OF Jason Heyward, IF Nico Hoerner, RHP Manuel Rodríguez, and RHP Keegan Thompson from IL. Recalled IF Christopher Morel from Iowa. Recalled C Miguel Amaya, RHP Anderson Espinoza, and LHP Brailyn Márquez from Tennessee. Recalled OF Alexander Canario and RHP Alexander Vizcaíno From South Bend. C Austin Romine elected free agency.
October 18	Activated IF David Bote, OF Nick Martini, RHP Tommy Nance, and IF Patrick Wisdom from the 60-day injured list. Designated C Erick Castillo and C Tyler Payne for assignment. Outrighted RHP Joe Biagini, OF Johneshwy Fargas, and Tyler Ladendorf outright to Iowa Cubs.
October 20	Outrighted C Erick Castillo and C Tyler Payne to Iowa.

==== November 2021 ====
November 3	C Robinson Chironos, RHP Zach Davies, IF Matt Duffy, and C José Lobatón elected free agency. OF Nick Martini, OF Trayce Thompson, RHP Kohl Stewart, and RHP Jonathan Holder outrighted to Iowa.
November 4	LHP Adam Morgan elected free agency.
November 5	Claimed LHP Wade Miley off waivers from Cincinnati Reds. Activated C P. J. Higgins from 60-day IL. Outrighted IF Trent Giambrone, C P. J. Higgins, and RHP Adrian Sampson to Iowa.
November 6	Outrighted LHP Rex Brothers to Iowa.
November 7	Activated OF Michael Hermosillo, IF Nick Madrigal, IF Alfonso Rivas, and LHP Brad Wieck from 60-day IL.
November 12	Signed free agents RHP Eligio Paredes, RHP Jensi Ramirez, LHP Kevin Valdez, and RHP Yafrerlyn Vasquez to minor league contracts.
November 19	Selected the contract of RHP Ethan Roberts from Iowa. Selected the contract of OF Nelson Velazquez from Tennessee Smokies. Signed free agents RHP Jonathan Holder and C P. J. Higgins to minor league contracts.
November 22	Traded cash to Cleveland Guardians for OF Harold Ramírez.
November 28	Signed free agents OF Narciso Crook and LHP Locke St. John to minor league deals.
November 30	RHP Trevor Megill claimed off waivers by Minnesota Twins. Signed free agent RHP Jair Jimenez to a minor league contract. RHP Jason Adam elected free agency.

==== December 2021 ====
December 1	Signed free agents OF Clint Frazier, C Yan Gomes, OF Michael Hermosillo, and RHP Marcus Stroman.
December 3	Signed free agent LHP Stephen Gonsalves to a minor league contract
December 15	Signed free agent RHP Mark Leiter Jr. to a minor league contract.
December 29	Signed free agent 2B Dixon Machado to a minor league contract.

==== January 2022 ====
January 24	Signed free agent RHP Eric Yardley to a minor league contract.
January 31	Signed free agent C John Hicks to a minor league contract.

==== February 2022 ====
February 8	Signed free agent LHP Matt Dermody to a minor league contract.
February 23	Signed free agent RHP Kevin McCarthy to a minor league contract.

==== March 2022 ====
March 14	Signed free agent RHP Jesse Chavez to a minor league contract.
March 15	Signed free agent SS Andrelton Simmons. Activated Simmons.
March 16	Signed free agent RHP David Robertson. Signed free agents LHPs Brandon Leibrandt and Eric Stout to minor league contracts.
March 17	Placed LHP Brad Wieck on the 60-day injured list. Signed free agent RHP Chris Martin. Assigned C Pablo Aliendo, OF D.J. Artis, 1B Bryce Ball, C Moises Ballesteros, OF Bradlee Beesley, RHP Hunter Bigge, IF Grayson Byrd, RHP Yovanny Cabrera, OF Owen Caissie, C Erick Castillo, OF Pete Crow-Armstrong, OF Brennen Davis, CF Zach Davis, CF Donnie Dewees, 2B Christian Donahue, RHP Manuel Espinoza, C Miguel Fabrizio, SS Edwin Figuera, OF Christian Franklin, 2B Trent Giambrone, LHP Stephen Gonsalves, RHP Jose Miguel Gonzalez, C Ethan Hearn, C John Hicks, C P.J. Higgins, OF Darius Hill, SS Ed Howard, RHP Jonathan Holder, LHP Ben Holmes, SS Josue Huma, SS Levi Jordan, LHP Adam Laskey, RHP Ben Leeper, LHP Brandon Leibrandt, RHP Mark Leiter Jr., 2B Dixon Machado, SS Kevin Made, OF Nelson Maldonado, LHP Conner Menez, OF Jordan Nwogu, SS Miguel Pabon, RHP Daniel Palencia, 2B Yonathan Perlaza, RHP Bailey Reid, C Tyler Payne, 2B Carlos Sepulveda, LHP Eric Stout, 2B Chase Strumpf, C Tim Susnara, 2B Andy Weber, RHP Cayne Ueckert, 2B Ildemaro Vargas, CF Jacob Wetzel, LHP Jordan Wicks, RHP Eric Yardley, 2B Jared Young, and 2B Delvin Zinn to Chicago Cubs.
March 18	Signed free agent OF Seiya Suzuki. Optioned RHP Alexander Vizcaino to Tennessee Smokies. Assigned OF Narciso Crook, RHP James Bourque, LHP Matt Dermody, RHP Aneuris Rosario, LHP Locke St. John, 3B David Villar, and C Harrison Wenson to Chicago Cubs.
March 19	Placed IF David Bote on 60-day injured list. Signed free agents LHP Daniel Norris, LHP Drew Smyly, and SS Jonathan Villar. Signed free agent Adrian Sampson to minor league contract. Assigned LHP Bryan Duson, RHP Scott Kobos, RHP Kevin McCarthy, RHP Walker Powell, and 2B Bryce Windham to Chicago Cubs.
March 20	Signed free agent OF Robel Garcia to a minor league contract. Assigned RHP Matt Swarmer and Jardo Wright to Chicago Cubs.
March 21	Signed free agent RHP Robert Gsellman to a minor league contract. Assigned LHP Wyatt Short and RHP Erich Uelmen to Chicago Cubs.
March 22	Signed free agent LHP Steve Brault to a minor league contract.
March 23	Designated SS Sergio Alcantara for assignment. Signed free agent RHP Mychal Givens.
March 24	Assigned IFs Cam Balego, Reginald Preciado, and James Triantos to Chicago Cubs.
March 25	Traded OF Harold Ramirez to Tampa Bay Rays for IF Esteban Quiroz. Optioned RHP Cory Abbott and 1B Greg Deichmann to Iowa. Optioned RHP Anderson Espinoza and LHP Brailyn Marquez to Tennessee. Designated RHP Tommy Nance for assignment. Assigned OF Brandon Hughes to Chicago Cubs.
March 26	Assigned RHP Javier Assad and OF Edmond American to Chicago Cubs.
March 27	Traded SS Sergio Alcantara to Arizona Diamondbacks for cash.
March 28	Optioned C Miguel Amaya to Tennessee. Assigned C Caleb Knight to Chicago Cubs.
March 29	Assigned RHP Kyle Johnson, SS Scott McKeon, IF BJ Murray Jr., and C Jake Washer to Chicago Cubs.
March 30	Assigned OF Ezequiel Pagan, RHP Eury Ramos, and IF Luis Verdugo to Chicago Cubs.

==== April 2022 ====
April 1	Assigned IF Christopher Morel, If Christian Olivo, IF Pedtro Ramirez, LHP Dalton Stambaugh, and OF Nelson Velazquez to Chicago Cubs.
April 2	Selected the contract of RHP Jesse Chaves from Iowa.
April 3	Optioned RHP Manuel Rodriguez to Iowa. Assigned OF Kevin Alcantara, OF Ismael Mena, and If Luis Vazquez to Chicago Cubs.
April 4	Assigned SS Jake Slaughter to Chicago Cubs.
April 5	Assigned Of Cole Roederer, C Ronnier Quintero, and IF Bryan Serra to Chicago Cubs.

== Regular season ==
=== Game log ===
Due to the 2021–22 Major League Baseball lockout, several games were initially canceled, but it was later announced that the games would be made up both through the use of doubleheaders and by delaying the end date of the regular season from October 2 to October 5.

2022 regular season game log: 74–88 (Home: 37–44; Away: 37–44)
April: 8–13 (Home: 4–6; Away: 4–7)

#	Date	Opponent	Score	Win	Loss	Save	Attendance	Record	Box/ Streak
1	April 7	Brewers	5–4	**Martin** (1–0)	Ashby (0–1)	**Robertson** (1)	35,112	1–0	W1
—	April 8	Brewers	Postponed (inclement weather); Makeup: May 30						
2	April 9	Brewers	9–0	**Steele** (1–0)	Woodruff (0–1)	—	30,369	2–0	W2
3	April 10	Brewers	4–5	Boxberger (1–0)	**Norris** (0–1)	Hader (1)	32,858	2–1	L1
4	April 12	@ Pirates	2–1	**Smyly** (1–0)	Quintana (0–1)	**Robertson** (2)	34,458	3–1	W1
5	April 13	@ Pirates	2–6	Peters (1–0)	**Hendricks** (0–1)	Crowe (1)	9,122	3–2	L1
6	April 14	@ Rockies	5–2	**Thompson** (1–0)	Freeland (0–2)	**Givens** (1)	24,444	4–2	W1
7	April 15	@ Rockies	5–6	Blach (1–0)	**Stroman** (0–1)	Bard (3)	35,450	4–3	L1
8	April 16	@ Rockies	6–9	Senzatela (1–0)	**Leiter Jr.** (0–1)	Bard (4)	37,476	4–4	L2
9	April 17	@ Rockies	6–4	**Wick** (1–0)	Gomber (0–1)	**Robertson** (3)	36,391	5–4	W1
10	April 18	Rays	4–2	**Thompson** (2–0)	Adam (0–1)	**Robertson** (4)	26,615	6–4	W2
11	April 19	Rays	5–6	Fleming (2–1)	**Steele** (1–1)	Kittredge (2)	26,568	6–5	L1
12	April 20	Rays	2–8 (6)	Beeks (1–0)	**Stroman** (0–2)	—	26,167	6–6	L2
13	April 21	Pirates	3–4	Crowe (1–0)	**Roberts** (0–1)	Stratton (1)	32,341	6–7	L3
14	April 22	Pirates	2–4	De Jong (1–0)	**Smyly** (1–1)	Stratton (2)	25,005	6–8	L4
15	April 23	Pirates	21–0	**Hendricks** (1–1)	Thompson (0–2)	—	39,917	7–8	W1
16	April 24	Pirates	3–4	Peters (3–0)	**Steele** (1–2)	Bednar (2)	28,387	7–9	L1
17	April 26	@ Braves	1–3	Fried (2–2)	**Stroman** (0–3)	Jansen (5)	31,990	7–10	L2
18	April 27	@ Braves	6–3 (10)	**Robertson** (1–0)	Matzek (0–1)	**Wick** (1)	30,362	8–10	W1
19	April 28	@ Braves	1–5	Wright (3–0)	**Smyly** (1–2)	—	34,183	8–11	L1
20	April 29	@ Brewers	1–11	Houser (2–2)	**Hendricks** (1–2)	—	29,062	8–12	L2
21	April 30	@ Brewers	1–9	Lauer (2–0)	**Steele** (1–3)	—	37,263	8–13	L3

May: 12–16 (Home: 4–11; Away: 8–5)

#	Date	Opponent	Score	Win	Loss	Save	Attendance	Record	Box/ Streak
22	May 1	@ Brewers	2–0	**Stroman** (1–3)	Burnes (1–1)	**Robertson** (5)	35,137	9–13	W1
23	May 3	White Sox	1–3	López (3–0)	**Effross** (0–1)	Hendriks (6)	34,206	9–14	L1
24	May 4	White Sox	3–4	Giolito (1–1)	**Hendricks** (1–3)	Hendriks (7)	36,755	9–15	L2
—	May 6	Dodgers	Postponed (inclement weather); Makeup: May 7						
25	May 7 (1)	Dodgers	0–7	Kershaw (4–0)	**Smyly** (1–3)	—	37,594	9–16	L3
26	May 7 (2)	Dodgers	2–6	Anderson (3–0)	**Norris** (0–2)	—	31,520	9–17	L4
27	May 8	Dodgers	1–7	Buehler (4–1)	**Steele** (1–4)	—	31,424	9–18	L5
28	May 9	@ Padres	6–0	**Hendricks** (2–3)	Gore (2–1)	—	41,595	10–18	W1
29	May 10	@ Padres	4–5	Wilson (3–0)	**Gsellman** (0–1)	Rogers (12)	31,047	10–19	L1
30	May 11	@ Padres	7–5	**Givens** (2–0)	García (0–2)	**Wick** (2)	29,344	11–19	W1
31	May 13	@ Diamondbacks	3–4	Davies (2–1)	**Smyly** (1–4)	Melancon (7)	21,765	11–20	L1
32	May 14	@ Diamondbacks	4–1	**Givens** (3–0)	Melancon (0–5)	**Wick** (3)	25,169	12–20	W1
33	May 15	@ Diamondbacks	3–2	**Effross** (1–1)	Kennedy (2–2)	**Wick** (4)	23,309	13–20	W2
34	May 16	Pirates	9–0	**Miley** (1–0)	Peters (3–2)	—	31,119	14–20	W3
35	May 17	Pirates	7–0	**Thompson** (3–0)	Brubaker (0–4)	—	30,478	15–20	W4
36	May 18	Pirates	2–3	Keller (1–5)	**Smyly** (1–5)	Bednar (8)	31,631	15–21	L1
37	May 19	Diamondbacks	1–3	Gallen (3–0)	**Stroman** (1–4)	Melancon (8)	32,631	15–22	L2
38	May 20	Diamondbacks	6–10	Castellanos (3–1)	**Hendricks** (2–4)	—	31,235	15–23	L3
39	May 21	Diamondbacks	6–7 (10)	Kennedy (3–2)	**Wick** (1–1)	Melancon (9)	32,269	15–24	L4
40	May 22	Diamondbacks	5–4	**Thompson** (4–0)	Kennedy (3–3)	—	32,606	16–24	W1
41	May 23	@ Reds	7–4	**Smyly** (2–5)	Gutiérrez (0–6)	**Robertson** (6)	12,029	17–24	W2
42	May 24	@ Reds	11–4	**Stroman** (2–4)	Mahle (2–5)	**Gsellman** (1)	14,386	18–24	W3
43	May 25	@ Reds	3–4	Castillo (1–2)	**Hendricks** (2–5)	Strickland (1)	11,417	18–25	L1
44	May 26	@ Reds	5–20	Greene (2–6)	**Steele** (1–5)	—	13,578	18–26	L2
45	May 28	@ White Sox	5–1	**Thompson** (5–2)	Cueto (0–1)	—	37,820	19–26	W1
46	May 29	@ White Sox	4–5 (12)	Foster (1–0)	**Gsellman** (0–2)	—	38,080	19–27	L1
47	May 30 (1)	Brewers	6–7	Sánchez (1–1)	**Norris** (0–3)	Hader (17)	39,305	19–28	L2
48	May 30 (2)	Brewers	1–3	Ashby (1–3)	**Espinoza** (0–1)	Hader (18)	28,620	19–29	L3
49	May 31	Brewers	8–7	**Givens** (4–0)	Boxberger (1–1)	**Robertson** (7)	30,596	20–29	W1

June: 10–17 (Home: 7–9; Away: 3–8)

#	Date	Opponent	Score	Win	Loss	Save	Attendance	Record	Box/ Streak
50	June 1	Brewers	4–3 (10)	**Leiter Jr.** (1–1)	Milner (2–1)	—	33,398	21–29	W2
51	June 2	Cardinals	7–5	**Thompson** (6–0)	Liberatore (1–1)	—	30,466	22–29	W3
52	June 3	Cardinals	5–14	Mikolas (4–3)	**Stroman** (2–5)	Thompson (1)	32,482	22–30	L1
53	June 4 (1)	Cardinals	6–1	**Swarmer** (1–0)	Oviedo (0–1)	—	32,792	23–30	W1
54	June 4 (2)	Cardinals	4–7 (10)	Gallegos (1–2)	**Rucker** (0–1)	—	31,673	23–31	L1
55	June 5	Cardinals	3–5 (11)	Cabrera (3–1)	**Norris** (0–4)	—	31,424	23–32	L2
56	June 7	@ Orioles	3–9	Baker (2–3)	**Thompson** (6–1)	—	11,509	23–33	L3
—	June 8	@ Orioles	Postponed (inclement weather); Makeup: August 18						
57	June 10	@ Yankees	1–2 (13)	Marinaccio (1–0)	**Mills** (0–1)	—	43,446	23–34	L4
58	June 11	@ Yankees	0–8	Montgomery (2–1)	**Swarmer** (1–1)	—	38,043	23–35	L5
59	June 12	@ Yankees	4–18	Taillon (7–1)	**Thompson** (6–2)	Bañuelos (1)	39,114	23–36	L6
60	June 13	Padres	1–4	Darvish (6–3)	**Wick** (1–2)	Rogers (19)	31,629	23–37	L7
61	June 14	Padres	5–12	Tyler (1–0)	**Effross** (1–2)	—	29,233	23–38	L8
62	June 15	Padres	5–19	Stammen (1–0)	**Kilian** (0–1)	—	31,570	23–39	L9
63	June 16	Padres	4–6	Musgrove (8–0)	**Swarmer** (1–2)	Rogers (20)	30,096	23–40	L10
64	June 17	Braves	1–0	**Martin** (1–0)	Minter (2–1)	**Robertson** (8)	35,676	24–40	W1
65	June 18	Braves	6–3	**Steele** (2–5)	Wright (7–4)	—	40,755	25–40	W2
66	June 19	Braves	0–6	Anderson (6–3)	**Hendricks** (2–6)	—	40,369	25–41	L1
67	June 20	@ Pirates	1–12	Brubaker (1–7)	**Kilian** (0–2)	—	11,312	25–42	L2
68	June 21	@ Pirates	1–7	Contreras (2–1)	**Swarmer** (1–3)	—	11,254	25–43	L3
69	June 22	@ Pirates	14–5	**Thompson** (7–2)	Eickhoff (0–1)	—	14,083	26–43	W1
70	June 23	@ Pirates	7–8 (10)	Stratton (4–3)	**Effross** (1–3)	—	14,529	26–44	L1
71	June 24	@ Cardinals	3–0	**Hendricks** (3–6)	Pallante (2–3)	**Robertson** (9)	46,524	27–44	W1
72	June 25	@ Cardinals	3–5	Helsley (3–0)	**Leiter Jr.** (1–2)	—	45,159	27–45	L1
73	June 26	@ Cardinals	6–5 (10)	**Robertson** (2–0)	Thompson (1–1)	—	44,824	28–45	W1
74	June 28	Reds	3–5	Castillo (3–4)	**Thompson** (7–3)	Strickland (4)	32,732	28–46	L1
75	June 29	Reds	8–3	**Steeele** (3–5)	Greene (3–9)	—	28,987	29–46	W1
76	June 30	Reds	15–7	**Hendricks** (4–6)	Ashcraft (4–2)	—	32,318	30–46	W2

July: 11–14 (Home: 5–6; Away: 6–8)

#	Date	Opponent	Score	Win	Loss	Save	Attendance	Record	Box/ Streak
77	July 1	Red Sox	6–5	**Hughes** (1–0)	Robles (1–3)	**Robertson** (10)	34,931	31–46	W3
78	July 2	Red Sox	3–1	**Leiter Jr.** (2–2)	Winckowski (3–2)	**Robertson** (11)	40,298	32–46	W4
79	July 3	Red Sox	2–4 (11)	Diekman (3–0)	**Wick** (1–3)	—	40,185	32–47	L1
80	July 4	@ Brewers	2–5 (10)	Boxberger (3–1)	**Effross** (1–4)	—	41,981	32–48	L2
81	July 5	@ Brewers	8–3	**Swarmer** (2–3)	Alexander (2–1)	—	30,561	33–48	W1
82	July 6	@ Brewers	2–1	**Givens** (5–0)	Hader (0–2)	**Robertson** (12)	32,696	34–48	W2
83	July 7	@ Dodgers	3–5	Gonsolin (11–0)	**Leiter Jr.** (2–3)	Vesia (1)	52,072	34–49	L1
84	July 8	@ Dodgers	3–4 (10)	Phillips (3–3)	**Wick** (1–4)	—	44,158	34–50	L2
85	July 9	@ Dodgers	2–4	Kershaw (6–2)	**Wick** (1–5)	Kimbrel (15)	45,198	34–51	L3
86	July 10	@ Dodgers	9–11	Bickford (1–1)	**Leiter Jr.** (2–4)	Graterol (3)	41,824	34–52	L4
87	July 12	Orioles	2–4	Lyles (6–7)	**Sampson** (0–1)	López (17)	31,079	34–53	L5
88	July 13	Orioles	1–7	Watkins (3–1)	**Steele** (3–6)	—	29,529	34–54	L6
89	July 14	Mets	0–8	Carrasco (10–4)	**Thompson** (7–4)	Williams (1)	34,051	34–55	L7
—	July 15	Mets	Postponed (inclement weather); Makeup: July 16						
90	July 16 (1)	Mets	1–2 (11)	Ottavino (4–2)	**Givens** (5–1)	Díaz (20)	39,219	34–56	L8
91	July 16 (2)	Mets	3–4 (10)	López (1–0)	**Givens** (5–2)	—	34,366	34–57	L9
92	July 17	Mets	3–2	**Wick** (2–5)	Smith (1–3)	**Robertson** (13)	34,424	35–57	W1
ASG	July 19	AL @ NL	3–2	Valdez (1–0)	Gonsolin (0–1)	Clase (1)	52,518	N/A	N/A
93	July 22	@ Phillies	15–2	**Steele** (4–6)	Gibson (5–4)	—	27,775	36–57	W2
94	July 23	@ Phillies	6–2 (10)	**Robertson** (3–0)	Alvarado (3–2)	—	38,542	37–57	W3
95	July 24	@ Phillies	4–3	**Smyly** (3–5)	Falter (0–3)	**Robertson** (14)	29,079	38–57	W4
96	July 25	Pirates	3–2	**Givens** (6–2)	De Los Santos (0–2)	**Effross** (1)	37,342	39–57	W5
97	July 26	Pirates	4–2	**Thompson** (8–4)	Wilson (1–6)	**Givens** (2)	30,978	40–57	W6
98	July 28	@ Giants	2–4	Wood (7–8)	**Steele** (4–7)	Doval (13)	32,259	40–58	L1
99	July 29	@ Giants	4–2	**Stroman** (3–5)	Cobb (3–5)	—	30,376	41–58	W1
100	July 30	@ Giants	4–5	Rogers (2–3)	**Smyly** (3–6)	Leone (3)	40,971	41–59	L1
101	July 31	@ Giants	0–4	Rodón (9–6)	**Sampson** (0–2)	—	33,622	41–60	L2

August: 15–15 (Home: 8–6; Away: 7–9)

#	Date	Opponent	Score	Win	Loss	Save	Attendance	Record	Box/ Streak
102	August 2	@ Cardinals	0–6	Wainwright (8–8)	**Thompson** (8–5)	—	44,344	41–61	L3
—	August 3	@ Cardinals	Postponed (inclement weather); Makeup: August 4						
103	August 4 (1)	@ Cardinals	3–4	Helsley (6–1)	**Uelmen** (0–1)	—	41,734	41–62	L4
104	August 4 (2)	@ Cardinals	2–7	Hicks (3–5)	**Castro** (0–1)	—	44,669	41–63	L5
105	August 5	Marlins	2–1	**Wick** (3–5)	Floro (0–1)	—	35,689	42–63	W1
106	August 6	Marlins	4–0	**Smyly** (4–6)	López (7–7)		36,787	43–63	W2
107	August 7	Marlins	0–3	Luzardo (3–4)	**Sampson** (0–3)	Scott (15)	30,177	43–64	L1
108	August 8	Nationals	6–3	**Thompson** (9–5)	Sánchez (0–5)	**Wick** (5)	30,904	44–64	W1
109	August 9	Nationals	5–6	Finnegan (3–2)	**Leiter Jr.** (2–5)	Edwards Jr. (1)	37,193	44–65	L1
110	August 10	Nationals	4–2	**Rucker** (1–1)	Cishek (1–3)	**Wick** (6)	29,019	45–65	W1
111	August 11	vs. Reds (Field of Dreams game)	4–2	**Smyly** (5–6)	Lodolo (3–4)	**Wick** (7)	7,823	46–65	W2
112	August 13	@ Reds	7–2	**Newcomb** (1–0)	Ashcraft (5–3)	—	33,301	47–65	W3
113	August 14	@ Reds	5–8	Kuhnel (2–1)	**Espinoza** (0–2)	Díaz (5)	23,959	47–66	L1
114	August 15	@ Nationals	4–5	Edwards Jr. (4–3)	**Hughes** (1–1)	Finnegan (5)	25,467	47–67	L2
115	August 16	@ Nationals	7–5 (11)	**Hughes** (2–1)	Arano (1–1)	**Leiter Jr.** (1)	26,362	48–67	W1
116	August 17	@ Nationals	3–2	**Uelmen** (1–1)	McGee (1–3)	**Wick** (8)	28,302	49–67	W2
117	August 18	@ Orioles	3–2	**Sampson** (1–3)	Watkins (4–3)	**Hughes** (1)	19,454	50–67	W3
118	August 19	Brewers	8–7	**Rucker** (2–1)	Milner (3–2)	**Hughes** (2)	39,962	51–67	W4
119	August 20	Brewers	6–5 (11)	**Uelmen** (2–1)	Strzelecki (1–1)	—	35,994	52–67	W5
120	August 21	Brewers	2–5	Suter (5–3)	**Wick** (3–6)	Rogers (29)	34,525	52–68	L1
121	August 22	Cardinals	0–1	Montgomery (7–3)	**Smyly** (5–7)	—	29,719	52–69	L2
122	August 23 (1)	Cardinals	2–0	**Rucker** (3–1)	Wainwright (9–9)	**Hughes** (3)	27,273	53–69	W1
123	August 23 (2)	Cardinals	3–13	Woodford (3–0)	**Sampson** (1–4)	—	28,163	53–70	L1
124	August 24	Cardinals	7–1	**Wick** (4–6)	Mikolas (10–10)	—	32,012	54–70	W1
125	August 25	Cardinals	3–8	Hudson (7–6)	**Stroman** (3–6)	—	28,803	54–71	L1
126	August 26	@ Brewers	4–3 (10)	**Newcomb** (2–0)	Williams (4–3)	**Rodríguez** (1)	33,549	55–71	W1
127	August 27	@ Brewers	0–7	Rogers (2–6)	**Wick** (4–7)	—	40,901	55–72	L1
128	August 28	@ Brewers	7–9	Lauer (10–5)	**Newcomb** (2–1)	Williams (9)	39,035	55–73	L2
129	August 29	@ Blue Jays	4–5 (11)	García (3–4)	**Leiter Jr.** (2–6)	—	26,473	55–74	L3
130	August 30	@ Blue Jays	3–5	Gausman (10–9)	**Little** (0–1)	Romano (28)	33,759	55–75	L4
131	August 31	@ Blue Jays	7–5	**Rodríguez** (1–0)	White (1–5)	**Wick** (9)	28,572	56–75	W1

September: 15–11 (Home: 7–6; Away: 8–5)

#	Date	Opponent	Score	Win	Loss	Save	Attendance	Record	Box/ Streak
132	September 2	@ Cardinals	0–8	Montgomery (8–3)	**Sampson** (1–5)	—	44,491	56–76	L1
133	September 3	@ Cardinals	4–8	Wainwright (10–9)	**Smyly** (5–8)	—	47,816	56–77	L2
134	September 4	@ Cardinals	0–2	Mikolas (11–10)	**Hughes** (2–2)	Helsley (13)	46,642	56–78	L3
135	September 6	Reds	9–3	**Wesneski** (1–0)	Gibaut (1–1)	—	27,600	57–78	W1
136	September 7	Reds	1–7	Minor (4–10)	**Assad** (0–1)	—	27,945	57–79	L1
137	September 8	Reds	3–4	Díaz (6–2)	**Leiter Jr.** (2–7)	Gibaut (1)	23,910	57–80	L2
138	September 9	Giants	4–2	**Smyly** (6–8)	Rodón (12–8)	**Hughes** (4)	31,309	58–80	W1
139	September 10	Giants	2–5	Webb (13–8)	**Stroman** (3–7)	Doval (21)	40,086	58–81	L1
140	September 11	Giants	2–4	Littell (3–3)	**Wesneski** (1–1)	Doval (22)	30,004	58–82	L2
141	September 12	@ Mets	5–2	**Assad** (1–1)	Bassitt (13–8)	**Hughes** (5)	28,081	59–82	W1
142	September 13	@ Mets	4–1	**Sampson** (2–5)	deGrom (5–2)	—	26,435	60–82	W2
143	September 14	@ Mets	6–3	**Smyly** (7–8)	Peterson (7–5)	**Leiter Jr.** (2)	28,522	61–82	W3
144	September 16	Rockies	2–1	**Stroman** (4–7)	Márquez (8–11)	**Rodríguez** (2)	31,775	62–82	W4
145	September 17	Rockies	1–3	Estévez (4–4)	**Alzolay** (0–1)	Bard (31)	34,530	62–83	L1
146	September 18	Rockies	3–4	Feltner (3–8)	**Assad** (1–2)	Bard (32)	35,627	62–84	L2
147	September 19	@ Marlins	3–10	Cabrera (6–3)	**Miley** (1–1)	—	8,315	62–85	L3
148	September 20	@ Marlins	2–1	**Alzolay** (1–1)	Okert (5–4)	**Hughes** (6)	7,972	63–85	W1
149	September 21	@ Marlins	4–3	**Thompson** (10–5)	Okert (5–5)	—	8,753	64–85	W2
150	September 22	@ Pirates	3–2	**Wesneski** (2–1)	Keller (5–12)	**Leiter Jr.** (3)	9,166	65–85	W3
151	September 23	@ Pirates	6–5	**Rodríguez** (2–0)	Ramírez (1–1)	**Uelmen** (1)	11,987	66–85	W4
152	September 24	@ Pirates	0–6	Oviedo (4–2)	**Miley** (1–2)	—	17,273	66–86	L1
153	September 25	@ Pirates	8–3	**Sampson** (3–5)	Ortiz (0–1)	**Hughes** (7)	16,192	67–86	W1
154	September 27	Phillies	2–1	**Stroman** (5–7)	Brogdon (2–2)	**Rodríguez** (3)	32,069	68–86	W2
155	September 28	Phillies	4–2	**Wesneski** (3–1)	Nola (10–13)	**Rodríguez** (4)	29,368	69–86	W3
156	September 29	Phillies	2–0	**Assad** (2–2)	Suárez (10–6)	**Thompson** (1)	23,425	70–86	W4
157	September 30	Reds	6–1	**Sampson** (4–5)	Ashcraft (5–5)	—	24,297	71–86	W5

October: 3–2 (Home: 2–0; Away: 1–2)

#	Date	Opponent	Score	Win	Loss	Save	Attendance	Record	Box/ Streak
158	October 1	Reds	2–1	**Miley** (2–2)	Law (2–3)	**Hughes** (8)	31,256	72–86	W6
159	October 2	Reds	8–1	**Stroman** (6–7)	Anderson (2–4)	—	30,029	73–86	W7
160	October 3	@ Reds	1–3	Greene (5–13)	**Wesneski** (3–2)	Díaz (10)	11,291	73–87	L1
161	October 4	@ Reds	2–3	Díaz (7–3)	**Hughes** (2–3)	—	13,738	73–88	L2
162	October 5	@ Reds	15–2	**Alzolay** (2–1)	Ashcraft (5–6)	—	12,437	74–88	W1

Legend: = Win = Loss = Postponement
Bold = Cubs team member

=== Season standings ===
==== National League Central ====
NL Central
Team	W	L	Pct.	GB	Home	Road
St. Louis Cardinals	93	69	.574	—	53‍–‍28	40‍–‍41
Milwaukee Brewers	86	76	.531	7	46‍–‍35	40‍–‍41
Chicago Cubs	74	88	.457	19	37‍–‍44	37‍–‍44
Pittsburgh Pirates	62	100	.383	31	34‍–‍47	28‍–‍53
Cincinnati Reds	62	100	.383	31	33‍–‍48	29‍–‍52

==== National League Wild Card ====
Division leaders
Team	W	L	Pct.
Los Angeles Dodgers	111	51	.685
Atlanta Braves	101	61	.623
St. Louis Cardinals	93	69	.574

Wild Card teams (Top 3 teams qualify for postseason)
Team	W	L	Pct.	GB
New York Mets	101	61	.623	+14
San Diego Padres	89	73	.549	+2
Philadelphia Phillies	87	75	.537	—
Milwaukee Brewers	86	76	.531	1
San Francisco Giants	81	81	.500	6
Arizona Diamondbacks	74	88	.457	13
Chicago Cubs	74	88	.457	13
Miami Marlins	69	93	.426	18
Colorado Rockies	68	94	.420	19
Pittsburgh Pirates	62	100	.383	25
Cincinnati Reds	62	100	.383	25
Washington Nationals	55	107	.340	32

=== Record vs. opponents ===
2022 National League record Source: MLB Standings Grid – 2022
Team	AZ	ATL	CHC	CIN	COL	LAD	MIA	MIL	NYM	PHI	PIT	SD	SF	STL	WSH	AL
Arizona	—	2–4	4–3	3–4	9–10	5–14	5–1	4–3	2–4	3–3	4–3	5–14	10–9	2–5	4–3	12–8
Atlanta	4–2	—	3–3	4–3	6–1	2–4	13–6	3–3	10–9	11–8	7–0	3–4	4–3	4–3	14–5	13–7
Chicago	3–4	3–3	—	11–8	3–4	0–7	4–2	10–9	4–3	6–0	10–9	2–5	2–5	6–13	4–2	6–14
Cincinnati	4–3	3–4	8–11	—	2–4	0–7	4–3	6–13	1–5	1–6	7–12	0–6	4–2	7–12	3–4	12–8
Colorado	10–9	1–6	4–3	4–2	—	8–11	2–4	3–4	2–5	2–5	3–3	10–9	5–14	2–4	3–4	9–11
Los Angeles	14–5	4–2	7–0	7–0	11–8	—	6–1	4–3	3–4	3–4	1–5	14–5	15–4	4–2	3–3	15–5
Miami	1–5	6–13	2–4	3–4	4–2	1–6	—	4–3	6–13	7–12	4–3	3–4	3–4	2–4	15–4	8–12
Milwaukee	3–4	3–3	9–10	13–6	4–3	3–4	3–4	—	2–4	2–4	11–8	3–4	3–4	9–10	3–3	15–5
New York	4–2	9–10	3–4	5–1	5–2	4–3	13–6	4–2	—	14–5	6–1	2–4	4–3	5–2	14–5	9–11
Philadelphia	3–3	8–11	0–6	6–1	5–2	4–3	12–7	4–2	5–14	—	6–1	4–3	1–5	4–3	16–3	9–11
Pittsburgh	3–4	0–7	9–10	12–7	3–3	5–1	3–4	8–11	1–6	1–6	—	2–4	1–5	6–13	4–3	4–16
San Diego	14–5	4–3	5–2	6–0	9–10	5–14	4–3	4–3	4–2	3–4	4–2	—	13–6	2–4	4–3	8–12
San Francisco	9–10	3–4	5–2	2–4	14–5	4–15	4–3	4–3	3–4	5–1	5–1	6–13	—	3–4	4–2	10–10
St. Louis	5–2	3–4	13–6	12–7	4–2	2–4	4–2	10–9	2–5	3–4	13–6	4–2	4–3	—	4–3	10–10
Washington	3–4	5–14	2–4	4–3	4–3	3–3	4–15	3–3	5–14	3–16	3–4	3–4	2–4	3–4	—	8–12

Updated with the results of all games through October 5, 2022.

=== Opening Day starters ===
Thursday, April 7, 2022 vs. Milwaukee Brewers at Wrigley Field

Name	Pos.
Rafael Ortega	DH
Nick Madrigal	2B
Willson Contreras	C
Ian Happ	LF
Frank Schwindel	1B
Seiya Suzuki	RF
Jason Heyward	CF
Patrick Wisdom	3B
Nico Hoerner	SS
Kyle Hendricks	P

=== Season summary ===
==== April ====
- **April 2** – The Cubs announced that Kyle Hendricks would be the Opening Day starting pitcher for the third consecutive season.
- **April 7** – The Cubs opened the season at Wrigley Field against division rival Milwaukee. Ian Happ had three hits and drove in two runs while Nico Hoerner hit his first home run since 2019 as the Cubs beat the Brewers 5–4. Kyle Hendricks allowed one run in 5.1 innings while David Robertson got the save.
- **April 9** – Following a rain out the day before, the Cubs faced the Brewers in the second game of the series. Justin Steele pitched five scoreless innings and three relievers held the Brewers hitless as the Cubs won 9–0. New Cub Seiya Suzuki drove in three runs while Happ had two hits and two RBI in the win. The Brewers hit three Cub batters in the game leading to Cub pitcher Keegan Thompson retaliating and hitting Andrew McCutchen. This led to the benches clearing and Thompson getting ejected.
- **April 10** – In the final game of the series, new Cub Marcus Stroman pitched five innings and allowed only one run. The Cubs scored three runs in the first on a three-run SeiyaSuzuki home run. However, the Cub bullpen struggled, giving up a 3–1 lead and the go-ahead run after the Cubs had tied the game at four. The 5–4 loss marked the Cubs' first loss of the season.
- **April 12** – After an off day, the Cubs traveled to face the Pirates in Pittsburgh. Seiya Suzuki hit two solo home runs while Drew Smyly continued the Cubs' starting pitchers success, allowing no runs in five innings. The Pirates managed only one run as the Cubs held on for the 2–1 win.
- **April 13** – The Cubs' string of good starting pitching ended as Kyle Hendricks gave up six runs in 3.2 innings. Willson Contreras homered and Seiya Suzuki drove in a run, but the Cubs could do nothing further as they lost to the Pirates 6–2.
- **April 14** – The Cubs traveled to Denver to face the Rockies for a four-game series. Seiya Suzuki drove in a run with an RBI double to extend his hit streak to six games while Frank Schwindel homered and drove in two runs as the Cubs beat the Rockies 5–2. Justin Steele allowed two runs in 4.1 innings, but Keegan Thompson pitched 3.1 scoreless innings of relief to earn the win. Mychal Givens pitched the ninth to earn his first save in the win.
- **April 15** – In game two of the series against the Rockies, the Cubs jumped to an early 3–0 lead on RBI singles by Alfonso Rivas and Rafael Ortega. Willson Contreras also drove in a run on a double. However, Marcus Stroman gave up five runs in the fourth and the Rockies went on to win 6–5.
- **April 16** – Needing a fifth starter for the first time on the season, Mark Leiter Jr. was called up for the start and surrendered seven runs in 3.1 innings as the Cubs fell behind big to the Rockies. Jonathan Villar drove in three runs as the Cubs narrowed the lead with four runs in the seventh, but it was not enough as the Cubs lost 9–6 to drop to .500 for the first time on the season.
- **April 17** – In the finale of the four-game series against the Rockies, Willson Contreras and Seiya Suzuki homered for the Cubs while Nico Hoerner drove in two as the Cubs won the game 6–4. Drew Smyly pitched well in 4.2 innings, allowing no runs in the win.
- **April 18** – The Cubs returned to Wrigley to face the Tampa Bay Rays. Kyle Hendricks allowed two runs in 4.1 innings while Keegan Thompson pitched 3.2 scoreless innings. Patrick Wisdom hit a two-run homer in the second, his first of the season, and Frank Schwindel also homered as the Cubs won 4–2. Seiya Suzuki added two hits and extended his hitting streak to nine games in the win. David Robertson earned his fourth save of the season.
- **April 19** – Justin Steele gave up four runs in 2.2 innings as the Cubs fell behind 4–0. However, they rallied behind Patrick Wisdom's second home run of the year, a pinch-hit homer in the fourth, to draw within one run. Cub reliever Chris Martin gave up two runs in the seventh meaning Nico Hoerner's run-scoring triple in the seventh left the Cubs behind by two. Hoerner would score on a wild pitch, but the Cubs could muster no more, losing 6–5 to the Rays.
- **April 20** – In the final game of the series against the Rays, Marcus Stroman gave up eight runs in 4.1 innings as the Cubs lost 8–2 in a game shortened to six innings due to rain. Seiya Suzuki's hitting streak ended at nine games, but he did extend his on-base streak to 12 (in his first 12 games in MLB).
- **April 21** – The Cubs took an early 3–0 lead against the Pirates at Wrigley, but Mark Leiter Jr., making his second start, gave up two runs in four innings while Ethan Roberts gave up two runs in just 2/3 of inning of relief as the Cubs lost their third in a row 4–3. The loss dropped the Cubs under .500 for the first time on the season.
- **April 22** – In a game whose start was delayed over six hours due to expected thunderstorms, the Cubs were held to two runs in a 4–2 loss to the Pirates. Drew Smyly gave up four runs in five innings in the loss, the Cubs' fourth in a row.
- **April 23** – Kyle Hendricks and two relievers shut out the Pirates and the Cub offense exploded for 21 runs while hitting only one home run. Alfonso Rivas drove in five runs while three other Cubs drove in three runs in the 21–0 blowout. The Cubs had 23 hits in the game, 18 of which were singles.
- **April 24** – Despite the prior days' offensive explosion, the Cubs only managed three runs and lost the third game of the series against the Pirates despite outscoring them by 15 in the series. The 4–3 loss was the Cubs' fifth loss in the prior six games.
- **April 26** – After an off day, the Cubs traveled to Atlanta to face the Braves. Marcus Stroman pitched six innings while allowing only two unearned runs, but the Cubs were only able to score on an Ian Happ solo home run as they lost 3–1. The loss dropped the Cubs to three games under .500 on the season.
- **April 27** – In game two of the series against Atlanta, the Cubs jumped to an early 3–0 lead. However, the Cub bullpen surrendered the lead in the bottom of the eighth and the game went into extra innings tied at three. In the first extra inning game of the year for the Cubs, Willson Contreras drove in the starting runner from second in the top of the 10th and Patrick Wisdom hit a two-run home run to give the Cubs the 6–3 win.
- **April 28** – In the final game of the series, the Cubs only mustered one run again while the Braves scored three times in the eighth to secure the 5–1 win.
- **April 29** – The Cubs next travelled to Milwaukee to face the Brewers. In game one of the series, Kyle Hendricks allowed six runs in 4.1 innings as the Cubs were blow out 11–1.
- **April 30** – In game two of the series, the Cubs were blown out again by the Brewers, losing 9–1. The Cubs managed only one run for the third straight game and for the fourth time in the prior five games. The loss dropped the Cubs to 8–13 on the season.

==== May ====
- **May 1** – In the finale of the series against the Brewers, Marcus Stroman threw seven scoreless innings and the Cub bullpen pitched two innings of scoreless relief as they won 2–0.
- **May 3** – After an off day, the Cubs returned to Wrigley to face the Chicago White Sox. Scott Effross made the start for the Cubs and allowed two runs in 1.1 innings. The Cub bullpen allowed only one run in relief, but again the Cubs managed only one run, losing the game 3–1.
- **May 4** – In the final game of the short two-game series, the Cubs took an early 3–1 lead on homers by Nico Hoerner and Patrick Wisdom, but Kyle Hendricks surrendered four runs in 5.2 innings and the Cubs lost to the White Sox 4–3.
- **May 7** – After a scheduled off day and a rainout of the first game of the series, the Cubs faced the Los Angeles Dodgers in doubleheader. In game one of the series, the Cubs were held scoreless by Clayton Kershaw and the Dodger bullpen. Drew Smyly gave up three runs in 4.1 innings while Robert Gsellman gave up five runs in 3.2 innings as the Cubs lost 7–0. In game two of the doubleheader, the Cubs were blown out again, losing 6–2. Daniel Norris got the start for the Cubs and allowed three runs in 1.1 innings in the loss.
- **May 8** – In the finale of the series, the Cubs lost their fifth straight, getting blown out again 7–1. Justin Steele, making an emergency start as Marcus Stroman was placed on the IL before the game, gave up two runs in four innings, but Michael Rucker surrendered three runs in just three innings in the loss. The loss dropped the Cubs to nine games under .500 on the season.
- **May 9** – The Cubs traveled to San Diego to face the Padres for a three-game series. Kyle Hendricks pitched 8.2 innings of scoreless ball as the Cubs won 6–0. Ian Happ doubled and drove in two runs in the win.
- **May 10** – In game two of the series, the Padres took a 2–0 lead off of Wade Miley who made his Cub debut. Alfonso Rivas homered in the third to tie the game, but Miley allowed another run to give the Padres a 3–2 lead. The Cub bullpen surrendered two more runs as the Cubs lost 5–4.
- **May 11** – In the finale of the three-game series against the Padres, Willson Contreras homered and Frank Schwindel drove in two runs, but the game remained tied in the eighth when Alfonso Rivas hit a two-run single to give the Cubs the lead. Rowan Wick pitched two scoreless innings for the save as the Cubs won 7–5.
- **May 13** – After an off day, the Cubs traveled to Arizona to face the Diamondbacks. Drew Smyly allowed fours runs in six innings of work while Ildemaro Vargas drove in two runs for the Cubs. However, it was not enough as the Cubs lost 4–3.
- **May 14** – Kyle Hendricks followed his stellar performance against the Padres by going 5.1 innings and allowing only one run and leaving with the game tied at one. The Cubs pushed across three runs in the top of the ninth including Yan Gomes second RBI of the night to give the Cubs the 4–2 win over the Diamondbacks.
- **May 15** – Justin Steele allowed only two runs in six innings, but the Cubs were still tied entering the ninth. Fran Schwindel drove in the go-ahead run on a single and Rowan Wick pitched the ninth for the 3–2 win over the Diamondbacks.
- **May 16** – Returning home to face the Pirates, Willson Contreras hit a grand slam, his 100th career homer while Wade Miley pitched seven scoreless innings as the Cubs won easily 9–0.
- **May 17** – The Cubs shut out the Pirates for the second consecutive day as the Cub pitching staff allowed only five hits in the 7–0 win. Infielder Christopher Morel hit a pinch hit home run in his first major league at bat as the Cubs won easily.
- **May 18** – Drew Smyly allowed three runs in 4.1 innings and the Cub offense was held in check for the first time in the series, managing only two runs in the 3–2 loss to the Pirates.
- **May 19** – Marcus Stroman returned from a bout of COVID-19 to make the start for the Cubs against the Diamondbacks and allowed three runs in five innings of work. The Cubs managed only one run in the 3–1 loss.
- **May 20** – In game two of the series against Arizona, Kyle Hendricks allowed four home runs and seven runs in eight innings. Each Cub relief pitcher allowed a home run as well as the D-backs hit seven on the day. The Cubs hit four homers, but it was not enough as they lost 10–6.
- **May 21** – The Cubs jumped out to a 4–0 lead in the game against Arizona and held the lead until the D-backs tied it in the eighth. In the 10th, Arizona scored three runs, two unearned to take at 7–4 lead. The Cubs scored two in the bottom of the 10th, but lost their fourth straight, 7–6. Patrick Wisdom and Frank Schwindel hit back-to-back home runs in the loss.
- **May 22** – In the finale of the four-game series against the D-backs, the Cubs again jumped to an early lead, this time 3–0 on a P. J. Higgins bases-clearing triple. However, once again, the Diamondbacks rallied to tie the game and took the lead in the seventh. However, for the second consecutive game, Patrick Wisdom and Frank Schwindel hit back-to-back home runs to give the Cubs the 5–4 win. It marked the first time Cub players had hit back-to-back home runs in consecutive games since Ernie Banks and Jim Hickman did it in 1969.
- **May 23** – Ian Happ hit his 14th career home run in Cincinnati as the Cubs traveled to face the Reds. Patrick Wisdom also homered for the fourth consecutive game as the Cubs beat the Reds 7–4.
- **May 24** – In the second game of the series against the Reds, Frank Schwindel hit two home runs and drove in three runs. Three other Cubs drove in two runs apiece as the Cubs won easily 11–4.
- **May 25** – Kyle Hendricks gave up four runs in four innings, but the Cub bullpen shut the Reds out for the rest of the game, limiting the Reds to only two more hits. However, the Cub offense could manage only three runs despite having the tying run on third in the ninth. As a result, the Cubs lost 4–3.
- **May 26** – Justin Steele gave up seven runs in two innings while the Cub bullpen surrendered eight runs. Shortstop Andrelton Simmons pitched the eighth inning for the Cubs and surrendered an additional five runs as the Cubs were blown out by the Reds 20–5.
- **May 28** – After an off day, the Cubs returned home to face the White Sox at Guaranteed Rate Field. Frank Schwindel hit two solo home runs and Patrick Wisdom also homered as the Cubs beat the Sox 5–1. Keegan Thompson started for the Cubs and allowed only one run in five innings.
- **May 29** – In the final game of the season against the White Sox, the game remained scoreless into the seventh before the Cubs pushed across a run on a Sox error to take the 1–0 lead. Marcus Stroman held the Sox to no runs in his seven innings. However, the Sox tied it on a wild pitch in the bottom of the ninth to send the game to extra innings. Both teams scored two in the 10th, but the Cubs could only manage one run in the 11th, while the Sox pushed across two for the 5–4 win.
- **May 30** – The Cubs returned to Wrigley for a doubleheader against the Brewers. In game one of the doubleheader, Matt Swarmer pitched well in his major league debut, allowing only one earned run in six innings, but Daniel Norris allowed three runs as the Cubs lost 7–6. In the second game, the Cubs could only manage one run as they lost to the Brewers 3–1.
- **May 31** – In game three of the series, the Cubs fell behind 3–1, but tied it in the fourth. The Brewers again took the lead in the sixth, but the Cubs rallied again in the bottom of the sixth, scoring four runs to take a 7–6 lead. The Brewers tied the game in the seventh before Patrick Wisdom hit a solo home run in the eighth to give the Cubs the 8–7 win.

==== June ====
- **June 1 –** In the final game of the series against the Brewers, the Cubs took an early 2–0 lead, but the Brewers retook the lead in the fifth. The Cubs tied it on an RBI-single by Willson Contreras in the fifth, but the game went to extra innings. In the 10th, Christopher Morel hit a sacrifice fly to drive in the winning run as the Cubs won 4–3.
- **June 2** – The Cubs welcomed the St. Louis Cardinals to Wrigley for a four-game series. Keegan Thompson started for the Cubs and pitched 5.1 innings while allowing three runs. Willson Contreras, Ian Happ, and Frank Schwindel homered for the Cubs as they held on for a 7–5 win.
- **June 3** – In game two of the series against the Cardinals, Marcus Stroman surrendered nine runs in four innings while the Cub bullpen surrendered an additional five runs as the Cubs were blown out 14–5.
- **June 4** – In game one of a doubleheader with the Cardinals, Matt Swarmer again pitched well for the Cubs, pitching six innings and allowing only one run. Frank Schwindel homered and drove in two runs while Ian Happ also drove in two as the Cubs won 6–1. In game two of the doubleheader, top pitching prospect Caleb Kilian allowed three runs in five innings of work. The Cubs were able to tie it in the sixth, but Michael Rucker surrendered four runs in the 10th and the Cubs lost 7–4.
- **June 5** – In the final game of the five-game series against the Cardinals, the Cubs again were able to force extra innings. But, once again the Cub bullpen struggled in extras, allowing two runs as the Cubs lost 5–3.
- **June 7** – After an off day, the Cubs visited the Orioles in Baltimore. Christopher Morel homered on the first pitch of the game, extending his streak of reaching base safely in his first 21 games of his career which also extended his Cubs' record. However, it was all downhill after that. Keegan Thompson surrendered seven runs in three innings and Alec Mills, making his season debut, allowed two runs in five innings of relief as the Cubs were blown out 9–3.
- **June 10** – After a rainout and a scheduled off day, the Cubs traveled to New York to face the Yankees. The game stayed tied at one until the 13th when the Yankees scored a run to knock off the Cubs 2–1.
- **June 11** – In game two of the series against the Yankees, Matt Swarmer gave up six solo home runs, including one by former Cub Anthony Rizzo as the Cubs were blown out 8–0.
- **June 12** – In the final game of the series against the Yankees, five Cub pitchers gave up at least two runs while Frank Schwindel only allowed one run in one inning of work on the mound as the Cubs were blown out again 18–4.. The loss was the Cubs sixth loss in a row.
- **June 13** – Opening a four-game series against the Padres at Wrigley, the Cubs lost their seventh game in a row as former Cub Yu Darvish pitched well for the Padres in the 4–1 loss.
- **June 14** – Kyle Hendricks allowed one run in five plus innings, but the Cub bullpen surrendered 11 runs as the Padres won easily 12–5.
- **June 15** – The Cubs were thrashed again by the Padres, losing 19–5 in game three of the series. The loss was the Cubs ninth straight.
- **June 16** – In the finale of the four-game series against the Padres, Matt Swarmer allowed four runs in 3.2 innings as the Cubs lost their 10th straight game, 6–4.
- **June 17** – Riding a 10-game losing streak, the Braves, who had won 14 in a row, next visited Wrigley Field. The Cubs became the first team in 23 years to stop a losing streak of 10 or more while ending the opponents winning streak of 10 or more by beating the Braves 1–0. Keegan Thompson and three relievers combined to allow only two hits in the win.
- **June 18** – Willson Contreras, playing in a game against his brother, William Contreras, for the first time, had three hits while Jonathan Villar drove in two runs as the Cubs won their second straight game, beating the Braves 6–3.
- **June 19** – In the finale of the three-game series against the Braves, Kyle Hendricks allowed six runs in 4.1 innings as the Cubs were shut out 6–0.
- **June 20** – The Cubs next visited the Pirates for a four-game series. In the first game, Caleb Kilian allowed seven runs in 2.1 innings while Alec Mills, making his season debut, allowed five runs in 4.1 innings as the Cubs were blown out 12–1.
- **June 21** – In game two of the series against the Pirates, Matt Swarmer allowed five runs in four innings and the Cubs lost their third in a row, 7–1.
- **June 22** – Patrick Wisdom homered and drove in four runs while Alfonso Rivas homered and drove in five runs as the Cubs routed the Pirates 14–5.
- **June 23** – In the finale of the series against the Pirates, the Cubs trailed 6–2, but scored five runs in the eighth to take a 7–6 lead. However, David Roberston allowed a homer in the bottom of the eighth and, in extra innings, Scott Effross allowed a run as the Cubs lost 8–7.
- **June 24** – The Cubs next travelled to face the Cardinals in St. Louis. After losing four of their previous five games, Kyle Hendricks pitched 7.1 innings of shutout baseball while Nico Hoerner homered and drove in two. The Cub bullpen pitched 1.2 innings of perfect baseball to give the Cubs the 3–0 win.
- **June 25** – The Cubs trailed for the majority of the game, but scored two runs in the eighth to tie it. However, the Cub bullpen quickly surrendered the lead in the bottom half of the eight as the Cubs lost to the Cardinals 5–3.
- **June 26** – In the finale of the three-game series against the Cardinals, the Cubs fell behind by five as the Cardinals hit three solo homers in the third. However, in the fourth, the Cubs rallied to tie the game at five as Rafael Ortega and Willson Contreras drove in two runs each. In the 10th, Contreras drove in a run David Robertson finished out the game for the 6–5 win.
- **June 28** – After an off day, the Cubs returned home to face the Reds for a three-game series. Keegan Thompson pitched well for six innings, but surrendered three runs in the seventh as the Cubs lost 5–3.
- **June 29** – Justin Steele allowed only one run in five-plus innings and Willson Contreras and Christopher Morel homered as the Cubs beat the Reds easily 8–3.
- **June 30** – Patrick Wisdom hit a grand slam and drove in six runs as the Cubs won 15–7 against the Reds. Christopher morel had five hits in the easy win.

==== July ====
- **July 1** – With the Red Sox visiting Wrigley for the first time since 2012, the Cubs trailed early, but scored three in the fifth and another three in the sixth to take the 6–5 lead. The Cub bullpen shut out the Sox as the Cubs held on for the win, their third straight.
- **July 2** – In game two of the series against the Red Sox, Alec Mills left with a back injury after facing just two batters. Mark Leiter pitched well in relief, allowing only one run in 5.1 innings. David Robertson secured the win a four-out save as the Cubs won 3–1.
- **July 3** – In the finale of the three-game series against the Red Sox, Patrick Wisdom hit a home run in the bottom of the eighth to tie the game at two. However, the Red Sox scored twice in the 11th as the Cubs lost 4–2.
- **July 4** – On Independence Day, the Cubs traveled to Milwaukee to face the Brewers. Tied at one in the top of the ninth, Seiya Suzuki, in his first game since May 20, hit an inside-the-park home run to give the Cubs the 2–1 lead. David Robertson walked in the tying run in the bottom of the ninth to force extra innings. Former Cub Víctor Caratini, who has struck out in all four previous plate appearances, hit a three-run homer in the bottom of the 10th to give the Brewers the 5–2 win.
- **July 5** – In game two of the series, Seiya Suzuki homered again and drove in three runs as the Cubs beat the Brewers 8–3. Kyle Hendricks left the game after three innings with a sore shoulder, but the Cub bullpen surrendered only one run in six innings of relief.
- **July 6** – Trailing 1–0 in the eighth, Rafael Ortega drove in the tying run and PJ Higgins doubled in the go-ahead run in the ninth as the Cubs came from behind to beat the Brewers 2–1.
- **July 7** – Traveling to Los Angeles to face the Dodgers, Mark Leiter Jr. allowed four runs in five innings while Christopher Morel homered and Seiya Suzuki drove in a run, but it was not enough as the Cubs lost 5–3.
- **July 8** – Keegan Thompson allowed only one run, an unearned run, in 5.2 innings, and the Cubs led 3–2 going into the bottom of the ninth. But, David Robertson walked in the tying run to send the game to extra innings and Rowan Wick allowed a run in the bottom of the 10th as the Cubs lost to the Dodgers 4–3.
- **July 9** – Marcus Stroman returned from the injured list, and pitched four innings without allowing a run, The Cubs scored two runs off Dodger starter Clayton Kershaw, but Rowan Wickk allowed three runs in the seventh as the Cubs lost again 4–2.
- **July 10** – PJ Higgins hit a grand slam in the first inning and the Cubs jumped out to 5–0 and 8–3 leads, but the Cubs' pitching allowed 11 runs as the Dodgers won 11–9 to complete the sweep.
- **July 12** – After an off day, the Cubs returned home to face the Baltimore Orioles. The Cubs again took an early lead, but could manage only two runs as they lost 4–2. The loss marked their fifth straight.
- **July 13** – Justin Steele allowed three earned runs in six innings, but the Cubs managed only one run against the Orioles. the Cub bullpen allowed three more runs as the Cubs lost 7–1.
- **July 14** – With the first-place New York Mets in town, Keegan Thompson allowed five runs in 4.1 innings as the Cubs were shut out 8–0, marking their seventh straight loss.
- **July 16** – After a rainout the previous day, the Cubs faced the Mets in a doubleheader. In the first game, the game went to extra innings tied at one. Neither team scored in the 10th before Pete Alonso hit a sacrifice fly to give the Mets the 2–1 victory. In game two of the doubleheader, the game again went to extras. The Mets scored two in the 10th off Michael Givens and the Cubs could manage only one run in the bottom half to fall again, 4–3. The loss marked the Cubs ninth straight loss.
- **July 17** – In the finale of the first half, the Cubs trailed 2–1 before Ian Happ drove in a run on a groundout in the eighth. Two batters later, Nico Hoerner drove in the go-ahead run on a single. David Robertson pitched the ninth to earn his 13th save of the season as the Cubs ended their nine-game losing streak with a 3–2 win over the Mets. The Cubs entered the All-Star break with a 35–57 record.
- **July 22** – After the All-Star break, the Cubs traveled to Philadelphia to face the Phillies for a three-game series. Nelson Velasquez hit two home runs and drove in five runs while Willson Contreras and Seiya Suzuki also homered as the Cubs routed the Phillies 15–2.
- **July 23** – In game two of the series against the Phillies, the game went to extra innings tied at one. In the 10th, the Cubs scored five runs helped by a throwing error by the Phillies and won 6–2.
- **July 24** – In the finale of the three-game series, Yan Gomes hit two home runs and the Cubs held on to win 4–3 to sweep the Phillies.
- **July 25** – The Cubs returned home to face the Pirates in Chicago. Adrian Sampson allowed two runs in seven innings of work while Nico Hoerner drove in two runs as the Cubs won 3–2.
- **July 26** – In the second game of the series and the final home game before the trade deadline, Ian Happ drove in two runs while Willson Contreras doubled as the Cubs beat the Pirates 4–2 marking their sixth straight win. The game may have been the final home game for Contreras and Happ who were rumored to be traded by the trade deadline.
- **July 28** – After an off day, the Cubs traveled to San Francisco to face the Giants. The Cubs were held without a hit until the seventh and managed only two runs as they lost 4–2, ending their six-game winning streak.
- **July 29** – In game two of the series, Patrick Wisdom hit a homer for the second consecutive game and Marcus Stroman pitched six scoreless innings as the Cubs beat the Giants 4–2.
- **July 30** – Drew Smyly allowed five runs in four innings and the Cubs trailed 5–1 entering the ninth. The Cubs pushed across three runs in the top of the ninth, but could not tie the game as they lost to the Giants 5–4.
- **July 31** – In the finale of the four-game series against the Giants and the final game before the trade deadline, the Cubs managed only four hits and were shut out by the Giants 4–0.

==== August ====
- **August 2** – After an off day, the Cubs traveled to face the Cardinals. In the first game after the trade deadline, Willson Contreras, who was not traded, tripled in his second at bat and reached base two other times after being hit by pitches. Keegan Thompson allowed five runs on 10 hits as the Cubs were shut out 6–0.
- **August 4** – Following a rainout, the Cubs took on the Cardinals in a doubleheader. In game one, The Cubs led until the seventh, when Marcus Stroman surrendered three runs to tie the game in at three. In the bottom of the ninth, the Cardinals pushed across the winning run to win 4–3. In the second game, the Cubs were limited to only two runs by newly-acquired (and former Cub) José Quintana and lost to the Cardinals 7–2.
- **August 5** – The Cubs returned home to face the Miami Marlins at Wrigley. Willson Contreras hit a two-run homer in the bottom of the eighth and Rowan Wick pitched 1.1 innings to earn the win as the Cubs won 2–1.
- **August 6** – In the second game of the series against the Marlins, Nico Hoerner had three hits and drove in a run as the Cubs beat the Marlins 4–0. Drew Smyly pitched 6.2 scoreless innings while Mark Leiter Jr. pitched 2.1 perfect innings of relief.
- **August 7** – In the finale of the series against the Marlins, the Cubs were shut out 3–0. Adrian Sampson allowed three runs in six innings, but the Cub offense was held to only two hits in the loss.
- **August 8** – The Cubs next faced the Nationals at Wrigley. Keegan Thompson pitched six innings while allowing only one run in the game. Nelson Velasquez and Christopher Morel homered for the Cubs as they won 6–3.
- **August 9** – Trailing 4–1 in the seventh, the Cubs rallied to take the lead on singles by Rafael Ortega, Willson Contreras, newly-acquired Franmil Reyes, and Nico Hoerner. However, Mark Leiter Jr. allowed a two-run homer in the eighth as the Cubs lost to the Nationals 6–5.
- **August 10** – The Cubs again scored four in the seventh inning after trailing the Nationals, but the bullpen held on to the lead as the Cubs won 4–2.
- **August 11** – The Cubs next traveled to Dyersville, Iowa to play the Reds in the Field of Dreams game. Drew Smyly pitched five scoreless innings and the Cubs took an early 3–0 lead. The Cub bullpen was able to hold the lead as the Cubs won 4–2.
- **August 13** – After an off day, the Cubs returned to Cincinnati to finish the series against the Reds. Willson Contreras, Rafael Ortega, and Ian Happ homered for the Cubs as the won easily 7–2.
- **August 14** – In the finale of the series against the Reds, Keegan Thompson allowed four runs in 1.2 innings and the Cub bullpen surrendered four more as they lost 8–5.
- **August 15** – The Cubs travelled to Washington to face the Nationals. Marcus Stroman allowed four runs in 4.2 innings, but the Cubs tied the game in the seventh on a Seiya Suzuki single. However, Brandon Hughes allowed a homer in the eighth as the Cubs lost 5–4.
- **August 16** – Justin Steele allowed one unearned run in six innings, but the Cub bullpen surrendered a 4–1 lead and the game went to extra innings. Both teams scored a run in the 10th before Patrick Wisdom doubled to score a run in the 11th and Seiya Suzuki singled in another run as the Cubs won 7–5 over the Nationals.
- **August 17** – With the game tied at two in the seventh, Yan Gomes drove in the go-ahead run and Rowan Wick pitched a perfect ninth for the save as the Cubs beat the Nationals 3–2.
- **August 18** – In a makeup game of an earlier rainout, the Cubs travelled to Baltimore to face the Orioles. Adrian Sampson pitched 5.2 scoreless innings while Willson Contreras homered twice to give the Cubs the 3–2 win.
- **August 19** – The Cubs then returned home for a three-game series with the Brewers. Patrick Wisdom hit a two-run homer, but the Cubs still trailed in the sixth. Christopher Morel hit a two-run homer in the sixth to give the Cubs the 7–6 win, their fourth win in a row.
- **August 20** – Rowan Wick allowed a two-run homer in the eighth to put the Cubs behind 3–2. In the ninth, Nick Madrigal singled to tie the game at three and force extra innings. Both teams scored in the 10th. After the Brewers pushed the lead to 5–4 in the 11th, Patrick Wisdom doubled in the tying run and Willson Contreras singled to give the Cubs the 6–5 win.
- **August 21** – The Cubs took an early lead on home runs by Ian Happ, his 100th career homer, and Seiya Suzuki. However, the Cub bullpen surrendered five runs after Justin Steele had pitched six scoreless innings and the Cubs lost to the Brewers 5–2.
- **August 22** – Beginning a five-game series against the Cardinals at Wrigley, the Cubs were shut out 1–0. Drew Smyly allowed only one run in seven innings in the loss.
- **August 23** – In game one of a doubleheader with the Cardinals, newly called-up Javier Assad got the start for the Cubs and pitched four innings without allowing a run. The Cub bullpen combined for five innings of scoreless baseball as the Cubs won 2–0. In game two of the doubleheader, the Cubs were blown out by the Cardinals 13–3.
- **August 24** – In the fourth game of the series, Luke Farrell got the start and pitched four scoreless innings while Zach McKinstry homered and drove in three runs as the Cubs won 7–1.
- **August 25** – In the finale of the series against the Cardinals, Marcus Stroman allowed five runs and 11 hits in five innings as the Cardinals won 8–3.
- **August 26** – The Cubs next faced the Brewers in Milwaukee. Ian Happ hit two two-run home runs, accounting for the only Cub hits in the game, as the Cubs beat the Brewers 4–3 in 10 innings.
- **August 27** – In game two, the Cubs were shut out by the Brewers 7–0 despite Drew Smyly pitching six scoreless innings.
- **August 28** – In the season finale against the Brewers, the Cubs again received good starting pitching as Adrian Sampson allowed only one run in 3.1 innings. However, the Cub bullpen surrendered eight runs and the Cubs lost 9–7.
- **August 29** – The Cubs next travelled to Toronto to face the Blue Jays. Javier Assad again pitched well, throwing five scoreless innings and left with a 4–0. However, the Cub bullpen quickly surrendered the lead and the game went to extras, tied at four. After neither team scored in the 10th, Danny Jansen homered in the 11th to give the Blue Jays the 5–4 win.
- **August 30** – Marcus Stroman allowed only one run in five innings, but the Cub bullpen again struggled, allowing four runs as the Cubs lost 5–3. Willson Contreras and Christopher Morel homered for the Cubs in the loss.
- **August 31** – In game three of the series against the Blue Jays, the Cubs jumped to an early 5–0 lead and held on for the 7–5 win.

==== September ====
- **September 2** – After an off day, the Cubs played the Cardinals in St. Louis. Adrian Sampson allowed two runs in five innings, but reliever Sean Newcomb allowed five runs in the seventh and eighth as the Cubs were shutout 8–0.
- **September 3** – Drew Smyly allowed seven runs in 2.1 innings as the Cubs again lost to the Cardinals 8–4.
- **September 4** – In the finale of the season series against the Cardinals, Marcus Stroman pitched seven scoreless innings, but the Cubs were again shutout, losing 2–0.
- **September 6** – After another off day, Hayden Wesneski, acquired from the Yankees at the trade deadline, made his major league debut, pitching five innings of shutout ball in relief of Wade Miley to earn the win. Seiya Suzuki drove in three runs in the 9–3 win over the Reds at Wrigley.
- **September 7** – Javier Assad allowed four runs in 5.1 innings and the Cubs managed only one run as they lost to the Reds 7–1.
- **September 8** – In the finale of the series, the Cubs took a 3–2 lead in the eighth on a Seiya Suzuki homer. However, the Reds scored two runs in the ninth to win the game 4–3.
- **September 9** – The Giants next came to Wrigley Field and Drew Smyly allowed only one run in seven innings of work. Yan Gomes and Nico Hoerner each hit two-run homers as the Cubs won 4–2.
- **September 10** – Marcus Stroman allowed four runs in four innings while the Cubs lost to the Giants 5–2.
- **September 11** – In the finale of the season series against the Giants, Heyden Wesneski allowed three runs in 3.2 innings of relief to earn his first loss. Seiya Suzuki homered for the Cubs in the 4–2 loss.
- **September 12** – The Cubs returned to the road to face the NL East-leading Mets. Javier Assad allowed only one run in six innings to earn his first win while Rafael Ortega and Zach McKinstry homered in the 5–2 win.
- **September 13** – Adrian Sampson pitched six scoreless innings and the Cub bullpen allowed only one run as the Cubs beat the Mets again 4–1. Ian Happ and David Bote homered for the Cubs in the win.
- **September 14** – The Cubs completed the three-game sweep against the Mets as they scored six runs in the first inning. Drew Smyly allowed two runs in five innings as the Cubs won 6–3.
- **September 16** – After an off day, the Cubs returned home to face the Rockies. Marcus Stroman earned his first win at Wrigley, allowing only one run in seven innings. The Cubs held on for the 2–1 win.
- **September 17** – Heyden Wesneski pitched seven innings and allowed only one run and left with the game tied at one. Adbert Alzolay, making his season debut, allowed two runs in two innings as the Cubs lost to the Rockies 3–1. The Cubs were officially eliminated from playoff competition with the loss.
- **September 18** – Javier Assad allowed four runs in two innings as the Cubs lost to the Rockies 4–3.
- **September 19** – The Cubs returned to the road to face the Marlins in Miami. Wade Miley allowed seven runs in three innings as the Cubs were blown out 10–3.
- **September 20** – David Bote drove in two runs with a homer and a sacrifice fly while Adrian Sampson allowed only one run in six innings. The Cub bullpen held the Marlins scoreless as the Cubs won 2–1.
- **September 21** – Trailing the Marlins 3–0 in the seventh, Patrick Wisdom homered to draw the game within two. The Cubs tied it in the eighth and Ian Happ's sacrifice fly gave the Cubs a 4–3 win. Keegan Thompson pitched three innings of scoreless relief to earn the win.
- **September 22** – Hayden Wisneski pitched 6.1 innings and allowed only two runs as the Cubs faced the Pirates in Pittsburgh. Christopher Morel drove in two runs as the Cubs won 3–2.
- **September 23** – Patrick Wisdom homered and drove in two runs while newly-called up infielder Esteban Quiroz drove in two runs including the go-ahead run in the eighth as the Cubs beat the Pirates 6–5.
- **September 24** – Wade Miley allowed three runs in four innings while Adbert Alzolay allowed three in three innings as the Cubs were shut out by the Pirates 6–0.
- **September 25** – In the finale of the season series with the Pirates, Adrian Sampson allowed only one run in six innings while Patrick Wisdom hit his 25th homer of the season and drove in three runs as the Cubs won 8–3.
- **September 27** – After an off day, the Cubs returned home for their final homestand of the season. Facing the Phillies who were in the wild card hunt, Marcus Stroman allowed one run in four innings while the Cub bullpen shut out the Phillies. Christopher Morel homered and Yan Gomes drove in the go-ahead run in the seventh as the Cubs won 2–1.
- **September 28** – Hayden Wisneski allowed only one run in five innings and Christopher Morel hit a three-run homer as the Cubs beat the Phillies 4–2.
- **September 29** – In the season finale against the Phillies, Javier Assad pitched five scoreless innings as the Cubs shut out the Phillies 2–0 to sweep the season series.
- **September 30** – In the final home series of the season Adrian Sampson continued to pitch well, allowing only one run in seven innings while Nico Hoerner drove in three runs. The 6–1 win marked the Cubs' fifth win in a row and their ninth win in their last 10 games.

==== October ====
- **October 1** – Seiya Suzuki homered to give the Cubs the lead in the seventh while the Cub bullpen held the Reds without a run as the Cubs won their sixth straight, 2–1.
- **October 2** – In the final game of the season at Wrigley Field, Willson Contreras, playing perhaps his last home game at Wrigley, received several standing ovations. Marcus Stroman earned his second straight win by throwing six scoreless innings while Nelson Velasquez drove in four runs as the Cubs won 8–1.
- **October 3** – In the final series of the year, the Cubs managed only two hits as they lost to the Red in Cincinnati 3–1. The loss ended the Cubs' seven-game winning streak.
- **October 4** – Leading 2–0 in the seventh, the Reds hit a two-run homer off of Keegan Thompson and pushed across the winning run in the ninth off of Brandon Hughes. The 3–2 loss was the second straight for the Cubs.
- **October 5** – In the season finale, the Cubs blew out the Reds 15–2 marking the Reds' 100th loss of the season. David Bote homered and drove in five runs in the win as the Cubs finished the season 74–88. The Cubs had a promising 39-31 record for the second half of the season despite having a 35-57 record at the All Star break.

=== Transactions ===
==== April ====
April 7	Activated RHP Ethan Roberts
April 11	Activated IF Alfonso Rivas.
April 15	RHP Keegan Thompson roster status changed (suspended two games).
April 16	Optioned IF Alfonso Rivas to Iowa. Selected the contract of RHP Mark Leiter Jr. and LHP Locke St. John from Iowa. Designated RHP Cory Abbott and IF Greg Deichmann for assignment.
April 17	Activated RHP Keegan Thompson.
April 21	Traded RHP Jesse Chavez and cash to Atlanta Braves for LHP Sean Newcomb. Traded RHP Cory Abbott to San Francisco Giants.
April 22	Placed OF Clint Frazier on 10-day injured list. Recalled IF Alfonso Rivas from Iowa. Sent IF Greg Deichmann outright to Iowa. Signed free agents C Yoanis Aleksandrov and C Dilver Gomez to minor league contracts.
April 30	Optioned RHP Mark Leiter Jr. to Iowa. Recalled LHP Locke St. John from Iowa.

==== May ====
May 2	Placed RHP Ethan Roberts on 10-day IL retroactive to April 30. Optioned LHP Locke St. John to Iowa.
May 3	Placed LHP Drew Smyly on the bereavement list. Designated LHP Locke St. John for assignment. Selected the contract of RHP Robert Gsellman from Iowa.
May 7	Activated LHP Drew Smyly from the bereavement list.
May 8	Optioned 1B Frank Schwindel to Iowa. Selected the contract of RHP Adrian Sampson from Iowa. Placed RHP Marcus Stroman on 10-day IL. Signed free agent LHP Luke Farrell to a minor league contract.
May 9	Placed RHP David Robertson on 10-day IL. Recalled 1B Frank Schwindel from Iowa. Optioned RHP Adrian Sampson to Iowa. Selected the contract of LHP Conner Menez from Iowa.
May 10	Placed OF Michael Hermosillo and IF Nick Madrigal on 10-day IL. Activated LHP Wade Miley. Selected the contract of IF Ildemaro Vargas from Iowa. Designated RHP Adrian Sampson for assignment.
May 11	Placed LHP Sean Newcomb on the 15-day IL. Recalled RHP Mark Leiter Jr. from Iowa.
May 15	Placed IF Nico Hoerner on the 10-day IL. Activated IF Andrelton Simmons.
May 17	Recalled IF Christopher Morel from Iowa. Optioned LHP Connor Menez to Iowa. Placed OF Jason Heyward on 10-day IL. Selected the contract of LHP Brandon Hughes from Iowa.
May 18	Activated RHP David Robertson from 10-day IL. Optioned RHP Mark Leiter Jr. to Iowa. Signed free agents OF Erbin Jaque and RHP Alfredo Romero to minor league contracts.
May 19	Activated RHP Marcus Stroman. Placed RHP Michael Rucker on 10-day IL. Placed RHP Alec Mills on 60-day IL.
May 22	Selected the contract of C P. J. Higgins from Iowa. Designated IF Ildemaro Vargas for assignment.
May 25	Activated IF Nico Hoerner from the 10-day IL. Placed C Yan Gomes on the 10-day IL.
May 28	Optioned LHP Brandon Hughes to Iowa. Activated OH Clint Frazier.
May 29	Placed RHP Chris Martin on bereavement list. Recalled RHP Mark Leiter Jr. from Iowa.
May 30	Placed OF Seiya Suzuki and IF Jonathan Villar on 10-day IL retroactive to May 27. Transferred RHP from the 10-day IL to the 60-day IL. Selected the contracts of LHP Brandon Hughes and RHP Matt Swarmer from Iowa. Recalled RHP Anderson Espinoza and OF Nelson Velázquez from Iowa. Designated RHP Robert Gsellman for assignment.
May 31	Activated IF Nick Madrigal. Optioned RHP Anderson Espinoza to Iowa. Signed free agent RHP Adrian Sampson to a minor league contract.

==== June ====
June 1	Optioned OF Nelson Velázquez to Iowa. Activated OF Jason Heyward and RHP Michael Rucker. Placed LHP Drew Smyly on 15-day IL retroactive to May 31. Placed RHP Manuel Rodrigues on 60-day IL.
June 2	Sent RHP Robert Gsellman outright to Iowa.
June 3	Signed free agent RHPs Stanley Guzman, Fraimin Marte, and Abel Moya to minor league contracts.
June 4	Optioned RHP Mark Leiter Jr. to Iowa. Selected the contract of RHP Caleb Kilian from Iowa. Recalled RHP Anderson Espinoza from Iowa. Designated LHP Conner Menez for assignment.
June 5	Optioned RHP Caleb Kilian to Iowa. Placed RHP Chris Martin on the restricted list. Sent LHP Connor Menez outright to Iowa.
June 6	Sent LHP Connor Menez outright to Iowa.
June 7	Activated RHP Alec Mills from the 60-day IL. Optioned RHP Anderson Espinoza to Tennessee.
June 10	Activated LHP Wade Miley from the 15-day IL. Activated Yan Gomes and IF Jonathan Villar from the 10-day IL. Activated RHP Chris Martin from the restricted list. Placed RHP Marcus Stroman on the 15-day IL retroactive to June 7. Designated OF Clint Frazier for assignment. Optioned IF Alfonso Rivas and RHP Michael Rucker to Iowa.
June 11	Placed LHP Wade Miley on 15-day IL. Recalled RHP Michael Rucker from Iowa.
June 12	Activated LHP Sean Newcomb. Optioned RHP Michael Rucker to Iowa.
June 13	Designated LHP Sean Newcomb for assignment. Selected the contract of LHP Eric Stout from Iowa
June 15	Recalled RHP Caleb Kilian from Iowa. Placed IF Nick Madrigal on the 10-day IL.
June 16	Selected the contract RHP of Adrian Sampson from Iowa. Designated LHP Eric Stout for assignment.
June 17	Sent OF Clint Frazier outright to Iowa.
June 18	Placed IF Frank Schwindel on the 10-day IL. Recalled IF Alfonso Rivas from Iowa.
June 20	Recalled OF Nelson Velazquez from Iowa. Optioned RHP Adrian Sampson to Iowa. Seng LHP Sean Newcomb outright to Iowa.
June 21	Traded LHP Eric Stout to Pittsburgh Pirates for cash. Recalled RHP Mark Leiter Jr from Iowa. Optioned RHP Caleb Kilian to Iowa.
June 23	Placed LHP Daniel Norris on 15-day IL. Recalled RHP Adrian Sampson from Iowa.
June 24	Activated IF David Bote from IL. Designated IF Jonathan Villar for assignment.
June 28	Released IF Jonathan Villar.
June 30	Selected the contract of OF Narciso Crook from Iowa. Placed OF Jason Heyward on 10-day IL retroactive to June 27. Transferred OF Michal Hermosillo to 60-day IL.

==== July ====
July 3	Placed RHP Alec Mills on 15-day IL. Recalled RHP Michael Rucker from Iowa.
July 4	Activated OF Seiya Suzuki from 10-day IL. Optioned OF Narciso Crook to Iowa.
July 5	Signed free agent RHP Charbel Gonzalez to a minor league contract.
July 6	Placed RHP Kyle Hendricks on 15-day IL. Recalled RHP Anderson Espinoza from Tennessee.
July 9	Activated RHP Marcus Stroman. Placed LHP Justin Steele on paternity list. Optioned RHP Michael Rucker to Iowa.
July 10	Activated LHP Drew Smyly. optioned RHP Michael Rucker to Iowa.
July 12	Optioned RHP Anderson Espinoza to Iowa. Activated LHP Justin Steele from paternity list.
July 13	Optioned RHP Matt Swarmer to Iowa. Activated LHP Daniel Norris.
July 14	Activated IF Franks Schwindel. Placed IF Andrelton Simmons on 10-day IL retroactive to July 11.
July 16	Recalled RHP Anderson Espinoza from Iowa. Optioned RHP Mark Leiter Jr. to Iowa. Selected the contract of LHP Steven Brault from Iowa. Designated RHP Matt Swarmer for assignment.
July 17	Designated LHP Daniel Norris for assignment. Optioned RHP Anderson Espinoza to Iowa. Selected the contract of RHP Erich Uelmen from Iowa.
July 21	Sent RHP Matt Swamer outright to Iowa.
July 22	Released LHP Daniel Norris.
July 23	Signed free agent RHP Nick Hull to a minor league contract. Signed RHP Connor Noland, SS Christopher Paciolla, RHP Will Frisch, RHP Brody McCullough, RHP Mason McGwire, RHP Cade Horton, and RHP Brandon Birdsell.
July 30	Traded RHP Chris Martin to Los Angeles Dodgers for IF Zach McKinstry. Recalled RHP Mark Leiter Jr. from Iowa. Signed RHP JP Wheat, LHP Branden Noriega, RHP Shane Marshall, RHP Mathew Peters, C Haydn McGeary, OF Ke'Shun Collier, RHP Nazier Mule, RHP Luis Rujano, OF Andy Garriola, and RHP Garrett Brown.
July 31	Traded IF Dixon Machado to San Francisco Giants for RHP Raynel Espinal. Optioned IF Alfonos Rivas to Iowa. Activated IF Zach McKinstry.

==== August ====
August 1	Traded RHP Scott Effross to New York Yankees for RHP Hayden Wesneski.
August 2	Traded RHP David Robertson to Philadelphia Phillies for RHP Ben Brown. Traded RHP Mychal Givens to New York Mets for RHP Saul Gonzalez. Placed LHP Steven Brault on 10-day IL. Activated IF Nick Madrigal from 10-day IL. Recalled RHP Anderson Espinoza from Iowa.
August 3	Recalled RHP Kervin Castro from Iowa.
August 4	Activated LHP Sean Newcomb. Selected the contract of LHP Sean Newcomb from Iowa. optioned IF David Bote to Iowa. Recalled LHP Matt Dermody from Iowa.
August 5	Optioned RHP Matt Dermody to Iowa.
August 6	Activated IF Andrelton Simmons. Designated IF Andrelton Simmons for assignment.
August 7	Released IF Andrelton Simmons.
August 8	Claimed OF Franmil Reyes off waivers from Cleveland Guardians.
August 9	Optioned IF Frank Schwindel to Iowa. Activated OF Franmil Reyes.
August 11	Recalled IF Alfonso Rivas from Iowa.
August 12	Optioned IF Alfonso Rivas to Iowa.
August 17	Optioned RHP Anderson Espinoza to Iowa. Activated LHP Steven Brault from 10-day IL.
August 20	Placed RHP Keegan Thompson on 15-day IL. Recalled RHP Anderson Espinoza from Iowa.
August 23	Optioned RHP Kervin Castro to Iowa. Selected the contract of RHP Nicholas Padilla from Iowa. Selected the contract of RHP Javier Assad from Iowa. Transferred OF Jason Heyward from the 10-day IL to the 60-day IL.
August 24	Selected the contract of RHP Luke Farrell from Iowa. Recalled RHP Kervin Castro from Iowa. Optioned RHP Anderson Espinoza to Iowa. Reassigned RHP Nicholas Padilla to minor leagues. Placed LHP Steven Brault on the 15-day IL. Transferred RHP Kyle Hendricks from the 15-day IL to the 60-day IL.
August 26	Optioned RHP Kervin Castro to Iowa. Activated RHP Manuel Rodriguez from the 60-day IL. Transferred RHP Alec Mills from the 15-day IL to the 60-day IL.
August 27	Placed IF Patrick Wisdom on 10-day IL retroactive to August 26. Recalled IF Alfonso Rivas from Iowa.
August 29	Placed RHP Adrian Sampson and LHP Justin Steele on the restricted list. Selected the contract of LHP Brendon Little.
August 30	Selected the contract of RHP Jeremiah Estrada from Iowa.

==== September ====
September 1	Recalled IF David Bote from Iowa. Activated RHP Adrian Sampson and LHP Justin Steele from restricted list. Placed LHP Wade Miley on the 60-day IL. Returned RHP Jeremiah Estrada and LHP Brendon Little to Iowa.
September 5	Designated RHP Kervin Castro for assignment. Selected the contract of RHP Hayden Wesneski from Iowa.
September 6	Activated OF Michael Hermosillo and LHP Wade Miley from the 60-day IL. Designated RHPs Luke Farrell and Nicholas Padilla for assignment. Placed C Willson Contreras on 10-day IL retroactive to September 3.
September 9	Sent RHP Kervin Castro outright to Iowa.
September 10	Activated IF Patrick Wisdom from 10-day IL.
September 14	Placed OF Rafael Ortega on the 60-day IL. Selected the contract of IF Jared Young from Iowa.
September 17	Placed OF Seiya Suzuki on the paternity list. Activated RHP Adbert Alzolay from the 60-day IL. Selected the contract of IF Esteban Quiroz from Iowa. Designated LHP Sean Newcomb and IF Frank Schwindel for assignment.
September 18	Released IF Frank Schwindel.
September 18	Sent LHP Sean Newcomb outright to Iowa.
September 21	Activated RHP Keegan Thompson from 15-day IL. Optioned RHP Jeremiah Estrada to Iowa.
September 27	Activated OF Seiya Suzuki from the restricted list. Activated C Willson Contreres from the 10-day IL. Designated OF Michael Hermosillo for assignment. Optioned IF Jared Young to Iowa.
September 30	Sent OF Michael Hermiosillo outright to Iowa.

== Roster ==
2022 Chicago Cubs
Roster
Pitchers: 73 Adbert Alzolay; 72 Javier Assad; 25 Steven Brault; 74 Kervin Castro; 43 Jesse Chavez; 64 Matt Dermody; 57 Scott Effross; 51 Anderson Espinoza; 56 Jeremiah Estrada; 60 Luke Farrell; 60 Mychal Givens; 43 Robert Gsellman; 28 Kyle Hendricks; 47 Brandon Hughes; 45 Caleb Kilian; 62 Mark Leiter Jr.; 57 Brendon Little; 58 Chris Martin; 65 Conner Menez; 20 Wade Miley; 30 Alec Mills; 15 Sean Newcomb; 49 Daniel Norris; 58 Nicholas Padilla; 21 Ethan Roberts; 37 David Robertson; 39 Manuel Rodríguez; 59 Michael Rucker; 41 Adrian Sampson; 11 Drew Smyly; 45 Locke St. John; 35 Justin Steele; 46 Eric Stout; 0 Marcus Stroman; 67 Matt Swarmer; 71 Keegan Thompson; 46 Erich Uelmen; 19 Hayden Wesneski; 50 Rowan Wick	Catchers: 40 Willson Contreras; 7 Yan Gomes; 48 P. J. Higgins; Infielders: 13 David Bote; 2 Nico Hoerner; 1 Nick Madrigal; 6 Zach McKinstry; 43 Esteban Quiroz; 36,67 Alfonso Rivas; 18 Frank Schwindel; 19 Andrelton Simmons; 4 Ildemaro Vargas; 24 Jonathan Villar; 16 Patrick Wisdom; 74 Jared Young	Outfielders: 24 Narciso Crook; 77 Clint Frazier; 8 Ian Happ; 32,37 Michael Hermosillo; 22 Jason Heyward; 5 Christopher Morel; 66 Rafael Ortega; 32 Franmil Reyes; 27 Seiya Suzuki; 4 Nelson Velázquez	Manager: 3 David Ross; Coaches: 88 Greg Brown (hitting); 63 Juan Cabreja (staff assistant); 81 Craig Driver (game strategy/catching); 91 Kyle Evans (data and development); 29 Andy Green (bench); 33 Willie Harris (third base); 68 Tommy Hottovy (pitching); 85 Garrett Lloyd (bullpen catcher); 53 Daniel Moskos (assistant pitching); 90 Jonathan Mota (staff assistant); 55 Mike Napoli (first base); 82 Johnny Washington (assistant hitting); 54 Chris Young (bullpen)

== Statistics ==
=== Batting ===
(final statistics)
Note: G = Games played; AB = At bats; R = Runs; H = Hits; 2B = Doubles; 3B = Triples; HR = Home runs; RBI = Runs batted in; SB = Stolen bases; BB = Walks; K = Strikeouts; AVG = Batting average; OBP = On-base percentage; SLG = Slugging percentage; TB = Total bases

Player	G	AB	R	H	2B	3B	HR	RBI	SB	BB	K	AVG	OBP	SLG	TB
David Bote	41	116	15	30	8	0	4	12	1	6	45	.259	.315	.431	50
Willson Contreras	113	416	65	101	23	2	22	55	4	45	103	.243	.349	.466	194
Narciso Crook	4	8	1	2	1	0	0	2	0	0	3	.250	.222	.375	3
Clint Frazier	19	37	4	8	3	0	0	1	1	7	11	.216	.356	.297	11
Yan Gomes	86	277	23	65	12	0	8	31	2	8	47	.235	.260	.365	101
Ian Happ	157	573	72	155	42	2	17	72	9	58	149	.271	.342	.440	252
Michael Hermosillo	31	61	7	7	2	0	0	4	1	7	27	.115	.250	.148	9
Jason Heyward	48	137	15	28	5	1	1	10	1	11	32	.204	.278	.277	38
P. J. Higgins	74	201	23	46	11	1	6	30	0	22	58	.229	.310	.383	77
Nico Hoerner	135	481	60	135	22	5	10	55	20	28	57	.281	.327	.410	197
Nick Madrigal	59	209	19	52	7	0	0	7	3	14	27	.249	.305	.282	59
Zach McKinstry	47	155	17	32	6	3	4	12	7	13	48	.206	.272	.361	56
Christopher Morel	113	379	55	89	19	4	16	47	10	38	137	.235	.308	.433	164
Rafael Ortega	118	316	35	76	14	1	7	35	12	44	74	.241	.331	.358	113
Esteban Quiroz	14	40	3	11	0	0	0	0	1	4	9	.275	.370	.275	11
Franmil Reyes	48	175	19	41	8	2	5	19	0	16	53	.234	.301	.389	68
Alfonso Rivas	101	251	27	59	5	2	3	25	6	29	87	.235	.322	.307	77
David Robertson	2	1	0	0	0	0	0	0	0	0	1	.000	.000	.000	0
Frank Schwindel	75	271	23	62	11	0	8	36	0	19	58	.229	.277	.358	97
Andrelton Simmons	34	75	8	13	1	0	0	7	4	7	13	.173	.244	.187	14
Seiya Suzuki	111	397	54	104	22	2	14	46	9	42	110	.262	.336	.433	172
Ildemaro Vargas	10	23	4	3	0	1	1	4	0	3	2	.130	.231	.348	8
Nelson Velázquez	77	185	20	38	7	3	6	26	5	19	65	.205	.286	.373	69
Jonathan Villar	46	153	19	34	6	2	2	15	6	11	42	.222	.271	.327	50
Patrick Wisdom	134	469	67	97	28	0	25	66	8	53	183	.207	.298	.426	200
Jared Young	6	19	2	5	2	0	0	1	0	3	7	.263	.364	.368	7
TEAM TOTALS	162	5425	657	1293	265	31	159	620	111	507	1448	.238	.311	.387	2097

=== Pitching ===
(final statistics)
Note: W = Wins; L = Losses; ERA = Earned run average; G = Games pitched; GS = Games started; SV = Saves; IP = Innings pitched; H = Hits allowed; R = Runs allowed; ER = Earned runs allowed; BB = Walks allowed; K = Strikeouts

Player	W	L	ERA	G	GS	SV	IP	H	R	ER	BB	K
Adbert Alzolay	2	1	3.38	6	0	0	13.1	9	5	5	2	19
Javier Assad	2	2	3.11	9	8	0	37.2	35	14	13	20	30
Steven Brault	0	0	3.00	9	0	0	9.0	8	4	3	5	8
Kervin Castro	0	1	7.59	8	0	0	10.2	11	9	9	5	7
Jesse Chavez	0	0	6.35	3	0	0	5.2	7	4	4	2	3
Matt Dermody	0	0	18.00	1	0	0	1.0	2	2	2	2	1
Scott Effross	1	4	2.66	47	1	1	44.0	36	19	13	11	50
Anderson Espinoza	0	2	5.40	7	0	0	18.1	14	11	11	16	19
Jeremiah Estrada	0	0	3.18	5	0	0	5.2	6	2	2	3	8
Luke Farrell	0	0	4.09	4	2	0	11.0	12	5	5	3	9
Mychal Givens	6	2	2.66	40	0	2	40.2	32	15	12	19	51
Robert Gsellman	0	2	4.70	8	0	1	15.1	17	10	8	3	9
Kyle Hendricks	4	6	4.80	16	16	0	84.1	85	45	45	24	66
Brandon Hughes	2	3	3.12	57	0	8	57.2	42	22	20	21	68
Caleb Kilian	0	2	10.32	3	3	0	11.1	11	15	13	12	9
Mark Leiter Jr.	2	7	3.99	35	4	3	67.2	52	32	30	25	73
Brendon Little	0	1	40.50	1	0	0	0.2	2	3	3	1	0
Chris Martin	1	0	4.31	34	0	0	31.1	38	16	15	4	40
Conner Menez	0	0	0.00	1	0	0	1.0	1	0	0	0	1
Wade Miley	2	2	3.16	9	8	0	37.0	31	0	13	14	28
Alec Mills	0	1	9.68	7	2	0	17.2	28	20	19	3	11
Sean Newcomb	2	1	9.13	17	1	0	22.2	26	24	23	15	24
Daniel Norris	0	4	6.90	27	1	0	30.0	23	28	23	21	43
Nicholas Padilla	0	0	5.40	1	0	0	1.2	2	1	2	2	1
Franmil Reyes	0	0	0.00	1	0	0	2.0	2	1	0	1	1
Ethan Roberts	0	1	8.22	9	0	0	7.2	10	7	7	6	9
David Robertson	3	0	2.23	36	0	14	40.1	23	10	10	19	51
Manuel Rodríguez	2	0	3.29	14	0	4	13.2	10	6	5	9	8
Michael Rucker	3	1	3.95	41	0	0	54.2	50	25	24	20	50
Adrian Sampson	4	5	3.11	21	19	0	104.1	101	40	36	27	73
Frank Schwindel	0	0	18.00	3	0	0	3.0	8	6	6	4	0
Andrelton Simmons	0	0	45.00	1	0	0	1.0	5	5	5	1	0
Drew Smyly	7	8	3.47	22	22	0	106.1	101	46	41	26	91
Locke St. John	0	0	13.50	1	0	0	2.0	3	3	3	0	4
Justin Steele	4	7	3.18	24	24	0	119.0	111	53	42	50	126
Eric Stout	0	0	4.91	2	0	0	3.2	3	2	2	1	6
Marcus Stroman	6	7	3.50	25	25	0	138.2	123	61	54	36	119
Matt Swarmer	2	3	5.03	11	5	0	34.0	33	26	19	20	36
Keegan Thompson	10	5	3.76	29	17	1	115.0	103	54	48	43	108
Erich Uelmen	2	1	4.67	25	0	1	27.0	25	14	14	12	21
Hayden Wesneski	3	2	2.18	6	4	0	33.0	24	9	8	7	33
Rowan Wick	4	7	4.22	64	0	9	64.0	79	37	30	29	69
TEAM TOTALS	74	88	4.00	162	162	44	1443.2	1342	734	642	540	1393

== Farm system ==
First baseman Matt Mervis, who led the minor leagues in RBIs and was third with 36 home runs, was named the Cubs 2022 Minor League Player of the Year.

In 2022, the Cubs managers in their farm system were as follows.

Level	Team	League	Manager	Location	Ballpark
AAA	Iowa Cubs	International League	Marty Pevey	Des Moines, Iowa	Principal Park
AA	Tennessee Smokies	Southern League	Michael Ryan	Knoxville, Tennessee	Smokies Stadium
High-A	South Bend Cubs	Midwest League	Lance Rymel	South Bend, Indiana	Four Winds Field at Coveleski Stadium
Single-A	Myrtle Beach Pelicans	Carolina League	Buddy Bailey	Myrtle Beach, South Carolina	TicketReturn.com Field
Rookie	ACL Cubs	Arizona Complex League	Edgar Pérez	Mesa, Arizona	Sloan Park
Rookie	DSL Cubs	Dominican Summer League	Enrique Wilson; Carlos Ramirez	Boca Chica, Dominican Republic	Baseball City Complex
