= Carter Hawkins =

American baseball executive (born c. 1984)

Chicago Cubs
- General Manager
- Born: August 7, 1984 (age 42); Atlanta, Georgia, U.S.

Teams
- Cleveland Indians (2009–2021); Chicago Cubs (2022–present)

Carter Hawkins (born circa 1984) is an American baseball executive. His Major League Baseball career began with the Cleveland Indians, as a scout. He became general manager of the Chicago Cubs in October 2021.

== Early life and education ==
Hawkins earned a bachelor's degree in 2007 from Vanderbilt University, where he also played baseball as a catcher.

== Baseball career ==
In 2008, Hawkins joined the Cleveland Indians baseball team as an advance scouting intern. He took a full-time role as a scout for the organization in 2009.

Hawkins was reported to be the scout that found perennial all star Jose Ramirez. On 7/1/2025, while being interviewed on 670am out of Chicago, Hawkins said that he did not discover Ramirez. Hawkins was named the team's assistant director of player development in 2010 and the director of player development in 2015. He was named the Indians' assistant general manager in 2016. He was named Sports Illustrated top young up and coming baseball executive in 2015.

On October 15, 2021, the Chicago Cubs hired Hawkins as their general manager.

== Personal life ==
Hawkins is married to his wife, Lindsay.
