= Locke St. John =

American baseball player (born 1993)

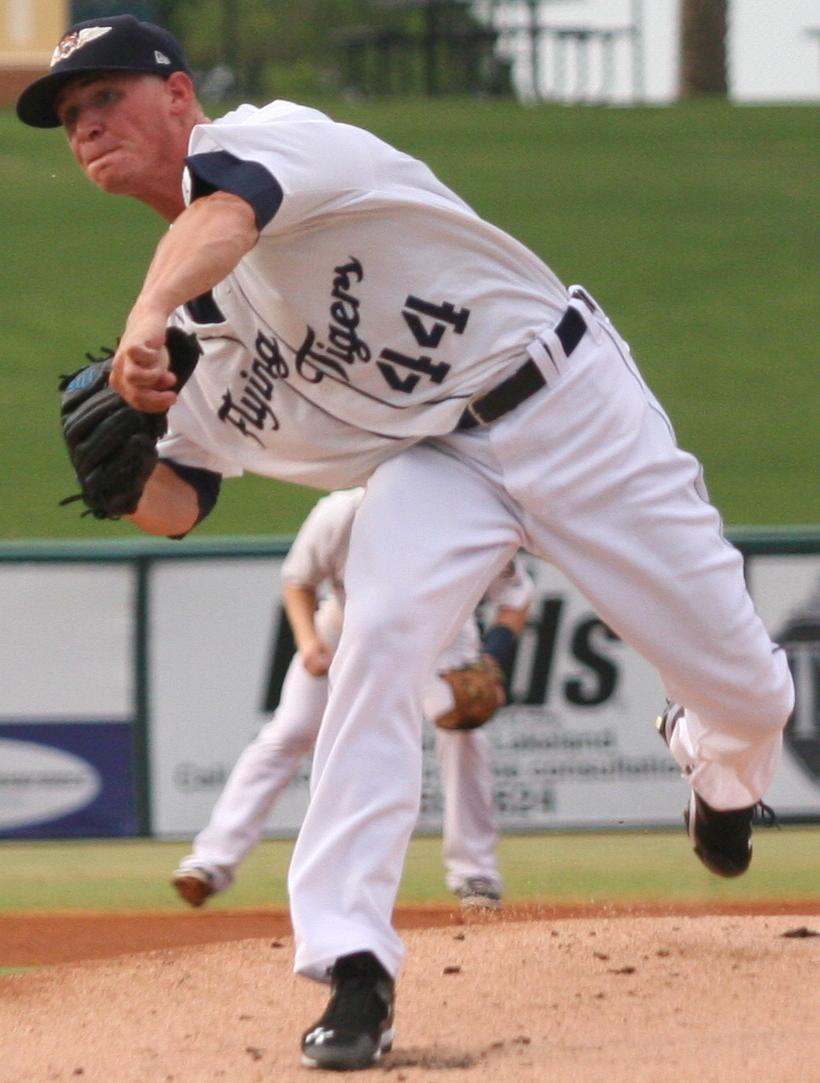
- St. John with the Lakeland Flying Tigers in 2014
- Relief pitcher
- Born: January 31, 1993 (age 33); Pell City, Alabama, U.S.
- Batted: Left Threw: Left

MLB debut
- June 25, 2019, for the Texas Rangers

Last MLB appearance
- April 30, 2022, for the Chicago Cubs

MLB statistics
- Win–loss record: 0–0
- Earned run average: 7.27
- Strikeouts: 9
- Stats at Baseball Reference

Teams
- Texas Rangers (2019); Chicago Cubs (2022)

Kenton Locke St. John (born January 31, 1993) is an American former professional baseball relief pitcher. He has previously played in Major League Baseball (MLB) for the Texas Rangers and Chicago Cubs.

== Career ==
St. John attended Pell City High School in Pell City, Alabama. He played college baseball at Southern Union Community College for two years and then transferred to the University of South Alabama for one season. He was drafted by the Detroit Tigers in the 32nd round, with the 970th overall selection, of the 2014 MLB draft.

=== Detroit Tigers ===
St. John spent the 2014 through 2017 seasons in the Tigers organization. During his time with them, he played for the GCL Tigers, Connecticut Tigers, West Michigan Whitecaps, and Lakeland Flying Tigers. During the 2017 season, he converted from a conventional over the top pitcher into a side-armer.

=== Texas Rangers ===
On December 14, 2017, St. John was selected by the Texas Rangers in the minor league phase of the Rule 5 draft. He split the 2018 season between the Down East Wood Ducks of the High–A Carolina League and the Frisco RoughRiders Double–A Texas League, going a combined 6–3 with a 2.67 ERA in 60 2/3 innings. He opened the 2019 season back with Frisco, and on June 6 he was promoted to the Nashville Sounds of the Triple–A Pacific Coast League. Between the two affiliates, St. John went 5–4 with a 4.38 ERA in 48 innings.

On June 20, 2019, St. John had his contract selected and he was promoted to the major leagues for the first time. He made his major league debut on June 25, retiring the two batters he faced. On September 1, St. John was designated for assignment after posting a 5.40 ERA and 5 strikeouts over 6 2/3 innings. He was removed from the 40–man roster and was sent outright to Nashville on September 3.

St. John did not play in a game in 2020 due to the cancellation of the minor league season because of the COVID-19 pandemic. He became a free agent on November 2, 2020.

=== Detroit Tigers (second stint) ===
On January 4, 2021, St. John signed a minor league contract with the Detroit Tigers. Over 36 games for the Toledo Mud Hens in 2021, he posted a 2.58 ERA.

=== Chicago Cubs ===
On November 29, 2021, St. John signed a minor league contract with the Chicago Cubs. He was assigned to the Triple-A Iowa Cubs to begin the season, posting a 5.14 ERA across five appearances. On April 16, 2022, the Cubs selected St. John's contract. St. John appeared in 1 game for Chicago, but surrendered 3 runs off of 2 home runs against the Milwaukee Brewers. He was designated for assignment on May 3 following the promotion of Robert Gsellman.

=== New York Mets ===
On May 10, 2022, St. John was claimed off waivers from the Chicago Cubs by the New York Mets, who designated him for assignment. The team opened up a spot on the 40-man roster for St. John when Jacob deGrom was transferred to the 60-day IL. He didn’t appear in a major league game for New York before he was designated for assignment on June 26. He cleared waivers and was sent outright to the Triple-A Syracuse Mets on July 1. He spent the remainder of the season with Syracuse, struggling to a 2-5 record and 6.00 ERA with 25 strikeouts in 42.0 innings pitched across 29 appearances. On October 14, St. John elected to become a free agent.

=== Minnesota Twins ===
On February 3, 2023, St. John signed a minor league contract with the Minnesota Twins organization. St. John was released by the organization on March 24.

== See also ==
- Rule 5 draft results
