= Nicholas Padilla =

American baseball player (born 1996)

Staten Island FerryHawks – No. 17
- Pitcher
- Born: December 24, 1996 (age 29); The Bronx, New York, U.S.
- Bats: Right Throws: Right

MLB debut
- August 23, 2022, for the Chicago Cubs

MLB statistics (through 2023 season)
- Win–loss record: 0–1
- Earned run average: 5.68
- Strikeouts: 7
- Stats at Baseball Reference

Teams
- Chicago Cubs (2022); Chicago White Sox (2023)

Nicholas Gilbert Padilla (born December 24, 1996) is an American professional baseball pitcher for the Staten Island FerryHawks of the Atlantic League of Professional Baseball. He has previously played in Major League Baseball (MLB) for the Chicago Cubs and Chicago White Sox. He plays for the Puerto Rico national baseball team.

== Career ==
Padilla attended Cardinal Spellman High School in the Bronx, New York, and Grayson College.

=== Tampa Bay Rays ===
The Tampa Bay Rays in the 13th round of the 2015 MLB draft. He made his professional debut in 2016, starting 8 games for the rookie-level Gulf Coast Rays. In 2017. Padilla spent the year with the Low-A Hudson Valley Renegades, pitching to a 3-2 record and 2.38 ERA with 29 strikeouts in 34.0 innings of work across 11 games (7 starts).

He spent the 2018 season split between Hudson Valley and the Single-A Bowling Green Hot Rods, registering a 4-7 record and 4.04 ERA with 53 strikeouts in 69.0 innings pitched. In 2019, Padilla spent the year with Bowling Green, logging a 7-2 record and 3.48 ERA with 76 strikeouts and 2 saves in 62.0 innings pitched. He did not play in a game in 2020 due to the cancellation of the minor league season because of the COVID-19 pandemic.

=== Chicago Cubs ===
On December 10, 2020, the Chicago Cubs selected Padilla in the minor league phase of the Rule 5 draft. He spent the 2021 season with the High-A South Bend Cubs, struggling to a 16.20 ERA in 2 appearances and missing the majority of the year due to injury. He spent time with three Cubs affiliates prior to his promotion in 2022, posting excellent results with South Bend, the Double-A Tennessee Smokies, and the Triple-A Iowa Cubs.

On August 23, 2022, Padilla was selected to the 40-man roster and promoted up to the majors for the first time. He made his major league debut that day against the St. Louis Cardinals, allowing a run in 1.2 innings pitched while recording his first career strikeout against eventual National League MVP Paul Goldschmidt. On September 6, Padilla was designated for assignment by the Cubs.

=== Chicago White Sox ===
On September 9, 2022, Padilla was claimed off waivers by the Chicago White Sox. He made seven appearances for the Triple-A Charlotte Knights to close out the year, posting a 3.00 ERA with six strikeouts in six innings pitched.

Padilla was optioned to Triple-A Charlotte to begin the 2023 season. In 3 appearances for Chicago, he recorded a 5.79 ERA with 6 strikeouts across 4 2/3 innings of work. Following the season on November 30, Padilla was removed from the roster and sent outright to Triple–A Charlotte.

In 2024, Padilla made 29 appearances split between Charlotte, the High–A Winston-Salem Dash, and rookie–level Arizona Complex League White Sox, compiling a cumulative 2.92 ERA with 46 strikeouts over 37 innings of work. He elected free agency following the season on November 4, 2024.

=== Philadelphia Phillies ===
On November 11, 2024, Padilla signed a minor league contract with the Philadelphia Phillies. In 34 appearances for the Triple-A Lehigh Valley IronPigs, he posted a 4-4 record and 5.10 ERA with 41 strikeouts across 42 1/3 innings pitched. Padilla was released by the Phillies organization on August 11, 2025.

=== Staten Island FerryHawks ===
On April 18, 2026, Padilla signed with the Staten Island FerryHawks of the Atlantic League of Professional Baseball.

== International career ==
Padilla played for the Puerto Rico national baseball team at the 2023 World Baseball Classic.

== See also ==
- Rule 5 draft results
