= Brandon Hughes (baseball) =

American baseball player (born 1995)

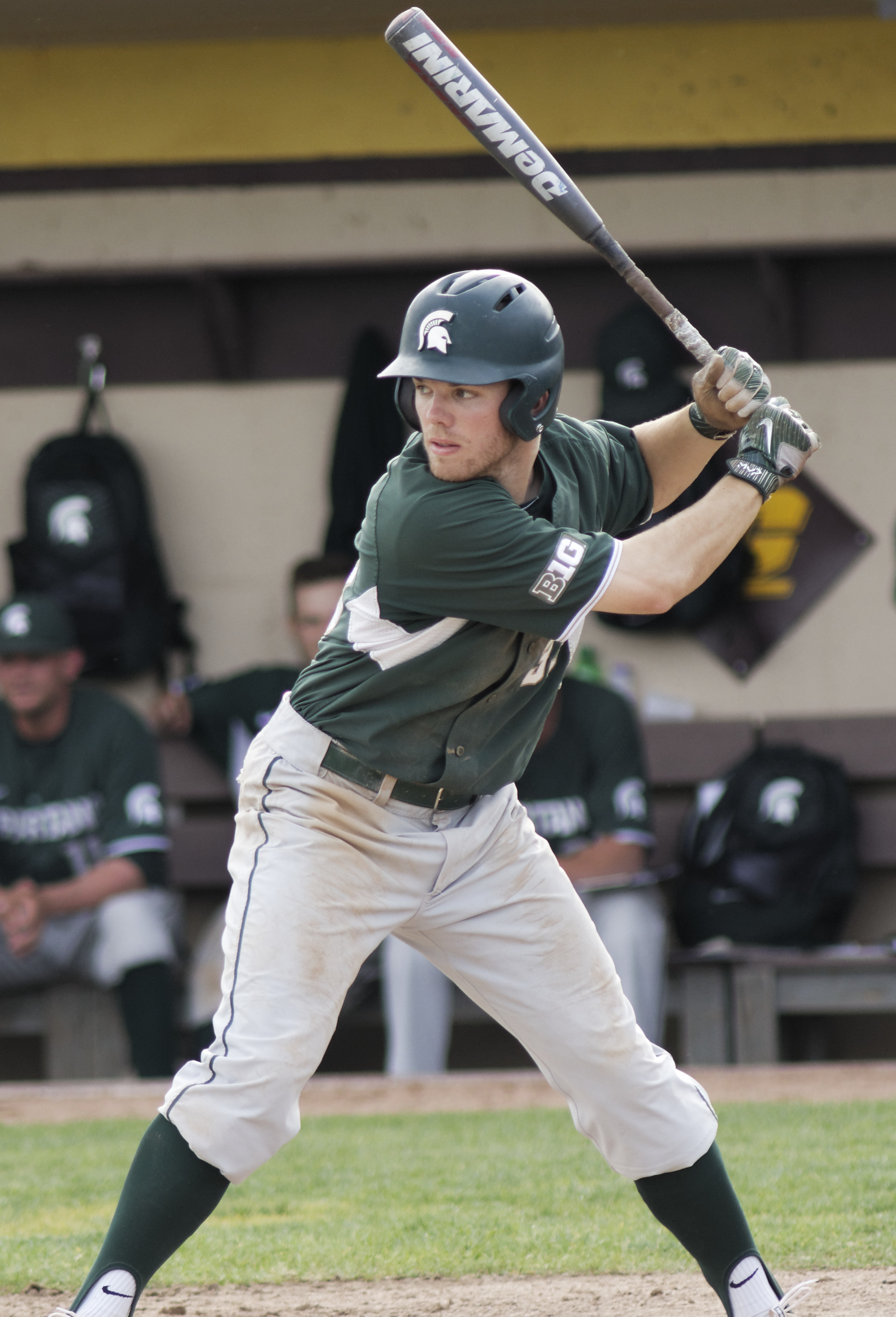
- Hughes with Michigan State in 2017

Free agent
- Pitcher
- Born: December 1, 1995 (age 30); Royal Oak, Michigan, U.S.
- Bats: Switch Throws: Left

MLB debut
- May 17, 2022, for the Chicago Cubs

MLB statistics (through 2024 season)
- Win–loss record: 2–6
- Earned run average: 4.75
- Strikeouts: 106
- Stats at Baseball Reference

Teams
- Chicago Cubs (2022–2023); Arizona Diamondbacks (2024)

Brandon Kenneth Hughes (born December 1, 1995) is an American professional baseball pitcher who is a free agent. He has previously played in Major League Baseball (MLB) for the Chicago Cubs and Arizona Diamondbacks.

== Career ==
=== Amateur career ===
Hughes attended Stevenson High School in Sterling Heights, Michigan. He then enrolled at Michigan State University, where he played college baseball for the Michigan State Spartans.

Hughes played collegiate summer baseball for the Kalamazoo Growlers of the Northwoods League in 2015.

=== Chicago Cubs ===
The Chicago Cubs selected Hughes in the 16th round of the 2017 Major League Baseball draft as an outfielder. The Cubs converted him from an outfielder into a pitcher in 2019.

Hughes was called up to the majors for the first time on May 17, 2022. He made his MLB debut that day. Hughes made five relief appearance for the Cubs, giving up two runs in 7.0 innings pitched while striking out 9 before he was removed from the 40-man roster and returned to Triple-A on May 28. On May 30, Hughes was selected back to the active roster. On August 18, Hughes earned his first career save after pitching a scoreless ninth inning against the Baltimore Orioles.

In 2023, Hughes made 17 appearances out of the Cubs' bullpen, but struggled to a 7.24 ERA with 17 strikeouts across 13 2/3 innings of work. On June 24, 2023, it was announced that Hughes would undergo a debridement surgery on his left knee, promptly ending his season. He was non-tendered and became a free agent on November 17.

=== Arizona Diamondbacks ===
On February 1, 2024, Hughes signed a minor league contract with the Arizona Diamondbacks. In 10 appearances for the Triple–A Reno Aces, he logged a 1.84 ERA with 12 strikeouts across 14 2/3 innings pitched. On April 30, the Diamondbacks selected Hughes' contract, adding him to the major league roster. On August 2, Hughes was removed from the 40–man roster and sent outright to Reno. On September 14, the Diamondbacks added Hughes back to their active roster. In 15 total appearances for the Diamondbacks, he struggled to an 8.15 ERA with 21 strikeouts across 17 2/3 innings pitched. On November 22, the Diamondbacks non–tendered Hughes, making him a free agent.

=== Chicago Cubs (second stint) ===
On January 31, 2025, Hughes signed a minor league contract with the Chicago Cubs. In 21 appearances for the Triple-A Iowa Cubs, he struggled to a 2-5 record and 6.33 ERA with 29 strikeouts and two saves over 27 innings of work. Hughes was released by the Cubs organization on July 13.
