= Matt Swarmer =

American baseball player (born 1993)

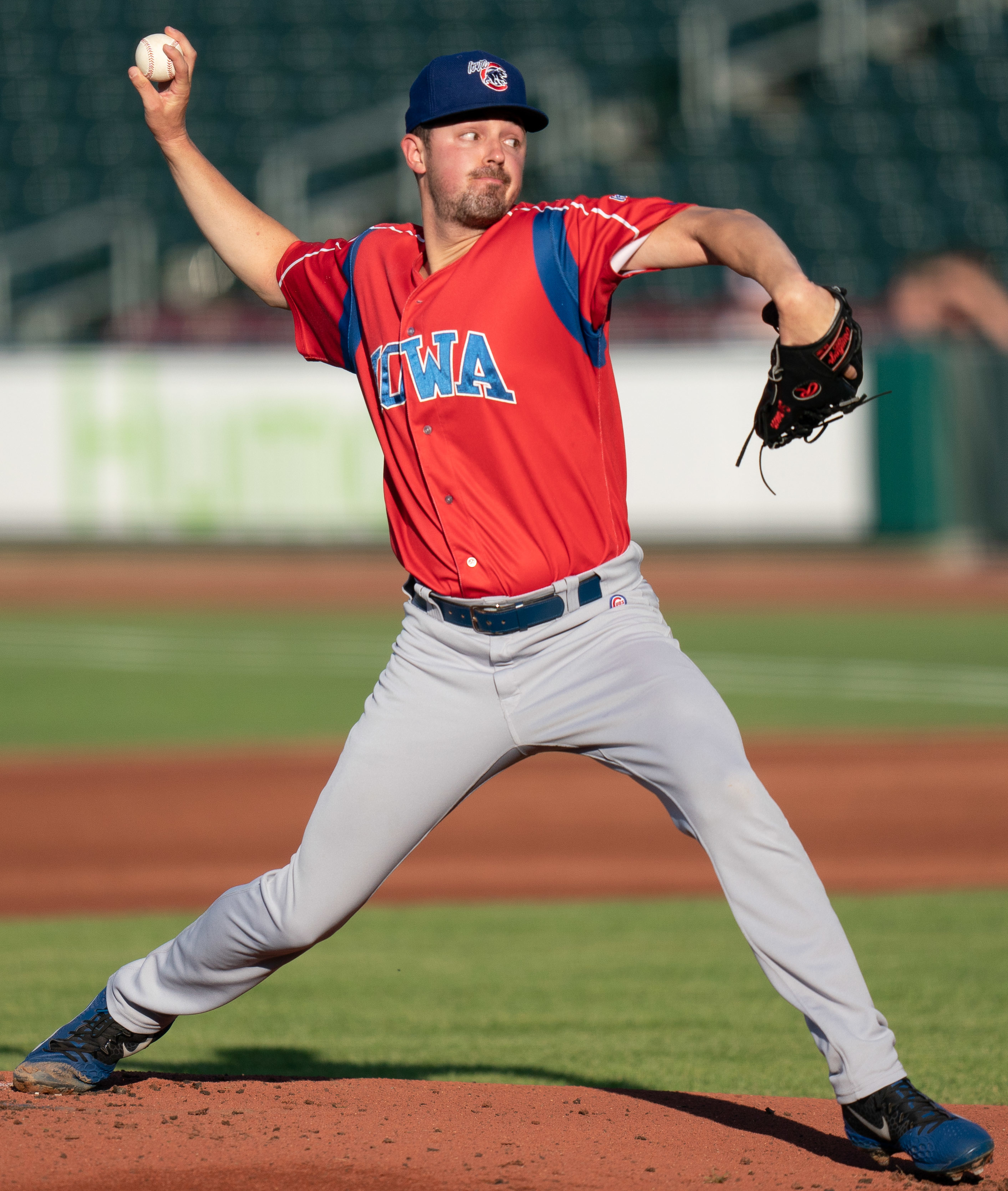
- Swarmer with the Iowa Cubs in 2021

Lancaster Stormers – No. 1
- Pitcher
- Born: September 25, 1993 (age 33); Reading, Pennsylvania, U.S.
- Bats: Right Throws: Right

MLB debut
- May 30, 2022, for the Chicago Cubs

MLB statistics (through 2022 season)
- Win–loss record: 2–3
- Earned run average: 5.03
- Strikeouts: 36
- Stats at Baseball Reference

Teams
- Chicago Cubs (2022)

Matthew Lee Swarmer (born September 25, 1993) is an American professional baseball pitcher for the Lancaster Stormers of the Atlantic League of Professional Baseball. He has previously played in Major League Baseball (MLB) for the Chicago Cubs.

== Amateur career ==
Swarmer attended Governor Mifflin Senior High School and played four years of college baseball at Kutztown University of Pennsylvania. After his senior year at Kutztown, he was selected by the Chicago Cubs in the 19th round of the 2016 Major League Baseball draft.

== Professional career ==
=== Chicago Cubs ===
Swarmer made his professional debut in 2016 with the Arizona League Cubs and worked his way through the minor league system with the Eugene Emeralds, Myrtle Beach Pelicans, South Bend Cubs, and Tennessee Smokies before reaching the Triple-A Iowa Cubs for the first time in 2017. In 2018, Swarmer split the season between Myrtle Beach and Tennessee, and was named the Cubs' Minor League Pitcher of the Year after starting 24 games and going 9–8 with a 3.22 ERA over 128 2/3 innings.

In 2019, Swarmer made 27 appearances (25 starts) for Iowa, posting a 10-11 record and 5.65 ERA with 137 strikeouts in 151 1/3 innings pitched. Swarmer did not play in a game in 2020 due to the cancellation of the minor league season because of the COVID-19 pandemic. He pitched in 24 games (starting 20) for Triple-A Iowa in 2021, logging a 3-8 record and 4.79 ERA with 120 strikeouts in 112 2/3 innings of work. Swarmer returned to Iowa to open the 2022 season.

On May 30, 2022, the Cubs selected Swarmer's contract and promoted him to the major leagues for the first time. He made his MLB debut that day as the starting pitcher in game one of a doubleheader versus the Milwaukee Brewers. He threw six innings and gave up four runs (only one earned) while striking out six batters in a 7-6 loss. On June 5, Swarmer earned his first career win, tossing six innings of one-run ball against the St. Louis Cardinals. He also became the first Cubs rookie since Gene Lillard in 1939 to throw six-plus innings and allow one or fewer runs in each of his first two big-league games.

On June 11, 2022, Swarmer tied a major-league record by allowing six solo home runs in a single game during an 8-0 loss to The Yankees. Swarmer also became the first Cubs pitcher to allow six homers in a game since Tom Lee in 1884. Swarmer had previously set another franchise record in 2019 with the Iowa Cubs, allowing 36 home runs in his 27 outings. He was designated for assignment by the Cubs on July 16. He cleared waivers and was sent outright to Triple-A Iowa on July 21. Swarmer elected free agency following the season on November 10.

=== Atlanta Braves ===
On February 25, 2023, Swarmer signed a minor league contract with the Atlanta Braves organization. In 19 games for the Triple–A Gwinnett Stripers, he struggled to an 8.07 ERA with 30 strikeouts in 32 1/3 innings pitched. On July 27, Swarmer was released by Atlanta.

=== Lancaster Barnstormers ===
On August 10, 2023, Swarmer signed with the Lancaster Barnstormers of the Atlantic League of Professional Baseball. In 7 starts for Lancaster, he posted a 4–1 record and 3.69 ERA with 52 strikeouts across 39.0 innings of work. With Lancaster, Swarmer won the Atlantic League championship. He became a free agent following the 2023 season.

=== Algodoneros de Unión Laguna ===
On May 9, 2024, Swarmer signed with the Algodoneros de Unión Laguna of the Mexican League. In 3 games for the Algodoneros, he struggled to a 13.50 ERA with 3 strikeouts across 2 2/3 innings. On May 22, Swarmer was released by Unión Laguna.

=== Lancaster Stormers (second stint) ===
On June 17, 2024, Swarmer signed with the Lancaster Stormers of the Atlantic League of Professional Baseball. In 16 starts for Lancaster, he posted a 5-4 record and 3.80 ERA with 99 strikeouts across 87 2/3 innings pitched. Swarmer became a free agent following the season.

On March 15, 2025, Swarmer re-signed with Lancaster. He made 13 appearances (including 12 starts) for the team, posting a 2–4 record and 7.91 ERA with 54 strikeouts across 46 2/3 innings pitched.

On May 29, 2026, Swarmer re-signed with Lancaster for a third consecutive season.
