= Michael Rucker (baseball) =

American baseball player (born 1994)

Seattle Mariners – No. 38
- Pitcher
- Born: April 27, 1994 (age 32); Columbus, Mississippi, U.S.
- Bats: Right Throws: Right

MLB debut
- July 30, 2021, for the Chicago Cubs

MLB statistics (through 2026 season)
- Win–loss record: 6–6
- Earned run average: 5.12
- Strikeouts: 170
- Stats at Baseball Reference

Teams
- Chicago Cubs (2021–2023); Seattle Mariners (2026–present)

Michael Patrick Rucker (born April 27, 1994) is an American professional baseball pitcher for the Seattle Mariners of Major League Baseball (MLB). He has previously played in MLB for the Chicago Cubs.

== Amateur career ==
Rucker played high school baseball while attending Auburn Riverside High School in Auburn, Washington. In 2011, as a junior, he was 8–2 with a 1.51 earned run average (ERA).

Undrafted out of high school, Rucker played college baseball for the Gonzaga Bulldogs. After his freshman year at Gonzaga, he transferred to play for the BYU Cougars. In 2016, his junior and final season at BYU, Rucker had an 11–1 record and 2.73 ERA in 102 1/3 innings, earning a spot on the All-West Coast Conference First Team.

== Professional career ==
=== Chicago Cubs ===
The Chicago Cubs selected Rucker in the 11th round of the 2016 MLB draft, and he signed with them for $180,000. He made his professional debut with the Arizona League Cubs before finishing the season with the Eugene Emeralds. In 12 2/3 relief innings pitched between both teams, he did not give up an earned run and was 3–0. He began 2017 with the South Bend Cubs, and after seven relief appearances in which he had a 1.42 ERA, he was promoted to the Myrtle Beach Pelicans, where he transitioned into a starting pitcher. In 20 games (15 starts) for Myrtle Beach, he was 5–5 with a 2.51 ERA. He spent the 2018 season with the Tennessee Smokies, going 9–6 with a 3.73 ERA in 26 starts. He returned to Tennessee to begin 2019 and was promoted to the Iowa Cubs during the season. Over 79 2/3 innings (pitched mainly in relief), Rucker compiled a 0–3 record with a 4.18 ERA and 93 strikeouts.

On December 12, 2019, the Baltimore Orioles selected Rucker in the Rule 5 draft. On March 6, 2020, the Orioles returned Rucker to the Cubs. He did not play a minor league game in 2020 due to the cancellation of the minor league season caused by the COVID-19 pandemic.

Rucker began the 2021 with Iowa. On July 30, Chicago selected his contract and promoted him to the active roster. He made his MLB debut that night against the Washington Nationals, throwing two innings of relief, giving up one run while recording one strikeout. He earned his first MLB save on September 19, retiring one batter. With the Cubs in 2021, he pitched 28 1/3 innings in relief with a 6.99 ERA and 30 strikeouts.

On April 30, 2022, Rucker struck out four batters in an inning. August 10, he earned his first MLB win after tossing a scoreless seventh inning against the Washington Nationals. He finished the year with a 3.95 ERA across 41 appearances. In 2023, Rucker pitched in 35 games for Chicago, with a 4.91 ERA and 40 strikeouts across 40 1/3 innings pitched. He was designated for assignment by the Cubs on February 1, 2024.

=== Philadelphia Phillies ===
On February 6, 2024, the Cubs traded Rucker to the Philadelphia Phillies for cash. He began the year on the injured list with a right hand arterial vasospasm, and was transferred to the 60–day injured list on June 3. Rucker was activated from the injured list on July 26. On September 3, the Phillies designated Rucker for assignment.

=== Washington Nationals ===
On September 6, 2024, Rucker was claimed off waivers by the Washington Nationals. In four appearances for the Triple-A Rochester Red Wings, he posted a 3.86 ERA with three strikeouts over 4 2/3 innings pitched. On November 4, Rucker was removed from the 40-man roster. He rejected an outright assignment and elected free agency.

=== Seattle Mariners ===
On January 8, 2026, Rucker signed a minor league contract with the Seattle Mariners. He made 22 appearances for the Triple-A Tacoma Rainiers, posting a 1–2 record and 1.59 ERA with 25 strikeouts across 22 2/3 innings pitched. On June 11, the Mariners selected Rucker's contract, adding him to their active roster. He made 37 relief appearances for the Mariners and ended the season with a 1–4 record, a 5.56 ERA, and 50 strikeouts across 43 2/3 innings.

== Personal life ==
Rucker is a convert to the Church of Jesus Christ of Latter-day Saints.

== See also ==
- Rule 5 draft results
