= Erich Uelmen =

American baseball player (born 1996)

Saraperos de Saltillo – No. 41
- Pitcher
- Born: May 19, 1996 (age 30); Las Vegas, Nevada, U.S.
- Bats: Right Throws: Right

MLB debut
- July 22, 2022, for the Chicago Cubs

MLB statistics (through 2023 season)
- Win–loss record: 2–1
- Earned run average: 5.79
- Strikeouts: 22
- Stats at Baseball Reference

Teams
- Chicago Cubs (2022); Philadelphia Phillies (2023)

Erich Uelmen (born May 19, 1996) is an American professional baseball pitcher for the Saraperos de Saltillo of the Mexican League. He has previously played in Major League Baseball (MLB) for the Chicago Cubs and Philadelphia Phillies.

== Amateur career ==
Uelmen attended Faith Lutheran High School in Las Vegas, Nevada, where he played baseball. In 2014, his senior year, he earned All-State honors after going 9–1 with a 1.19 ERA, striking out 89 batters over 58 2/3 innings alongside batting .510. Undrafted in the 2014 Major League Baseball draft, he enrolled at California Polytechnic State University where he played college baseball.

In 2015, Uelmen's freshman year at Cal Poly, he appeared in 16 games (making one start) in which he went 0–1 with a 7.08 ERA over twenty innings. That summer, he played in the Northwoods League with the Eau Claire Express. As a sophomore at Cal Poly in 2016, Uelmen went 5–3 with a 3.68 ERA, striking out seventy over 93 innings. Following the season, he played in the Cape Cod Baseball League for the Yarmouth-Dennis Red Sox, going 2–1 with a 4.87 ERA over twenty innings. In 2017, his junior season, he pitched to a 4–8 record with a 2.93 ERA over 15 starts, earning Big West Conference Second Team honors. After the season, he was selected by the Chicago Cubs in the fourth round of the 2017 Major League Baseball draft.

== Professional career ==
=== Chicago Cubs ===
Uelmen signed with the Cubs and made his professional debut with the Eugene Emeralds of the Low–A Northwest League, compiling a 2.04 ERA over 17 2/3 innings. In 2018, he began the season with the South Bend Cubs of the Single–A Midwest League before being promoted to the Myrtle Beach Pelicans of the High–A Carolina League in June. Over 21 games (twenty starts) between the two teams, he went 8–8 with a 3.83 ERA, striking out 82 over 89 1/3 innings. Uelmen returned to Myrtle Beach to begin the 2019 season before earning a promotion to the Tennessee Smokies of the Double–A Southern League in July, with whom he finished the season; over 17 starts with both clubs, he pitched to a 5–6 record with a 4.55 ERA, compiling 76 strikeouts over 91 innings. Following the season, he was selected to play in the Arizona Fall League with the Mesa Solar Sox.

Uelmen did not play a minor league game in 2020 due to the cancellation of the minor league season caused by the COVID-19 pandemic. He returned to the Smokies (now members of the Double-A South to begin the 2021 season. He moved into the bullpen during the season, and earned a promotion to the Iowa Cubs of the Triple-A East in mid-August. Over 31 games (11 starts) between the two teams, Uelmen went 2–9 with a 5.78 ERA and 88 strikeouts over 90 1/3 innings. He returned to Iowa to begin the 2022 season.

On July 17, 2022, the Cubs selected Uelmen's contract and promoted him to the major leagues. He made his MLB debut on July 22 at Wrigley Field versus the Philadelphia Phillies pitching one inning in relief, giving up one run while striking out a batter. On September 23, Uelmen allowed a hit and two walks in a scoreless inning against the Pittsburgh Pirates to earn his first career save. He was designated for assignment on December 24.

=== Philadelphia Phillies ===
On January 4, 2023, Uelmen was traded to the Philadelphia Phillies in exchange for cash considerations. Uelmen was optioned to the Triple-A Lehigh Valley IronPigs to begin the 2023 season. He made only one appearance for Philadelphia, surrendering four runs on three hits with one strikeouts across an inning of work. On September 30, Uelmen was placed on the 60–day injured list with a right flexor strain, ending his season. Following the season on November 6, Uelmen was removed from the 40–man roster and sent outright to Triple–A Lehigh Valley. He elected free agency the same day.

=== Arizona Diamondbacks ===
On June 4, 2024, Uelmen signed a minor league contract with the Arizona Diamondbacks. In 25 appearances split between the Triple-A Reno Aces and rookie-level Arizona Complex League Diamondbacks, he compiled an aggregate 1-0 record and 5.58 ERA with 28 strikeouts across 30 2/3 innings pitched. Uelmen elected free agency following the season on November 4.

=== High Point Rockers ===
On April 16, 2025, Uelmen signed with the High Point Rockers of the Atlantic League of Professional Baseball. Uelmen made 17 appearances (16 starts) for the Rockers, compiling a 6-4 record and 3.83 ERA with 65 strikeouts over 80 innings of work.

=== Saraperos de Saltillo ===
On April 18, 2026, Uelmen signed with the Saraperos de Saltillo of the Mexican League.
