= Narciso Crook =

Dominican baseball player (born 1995)

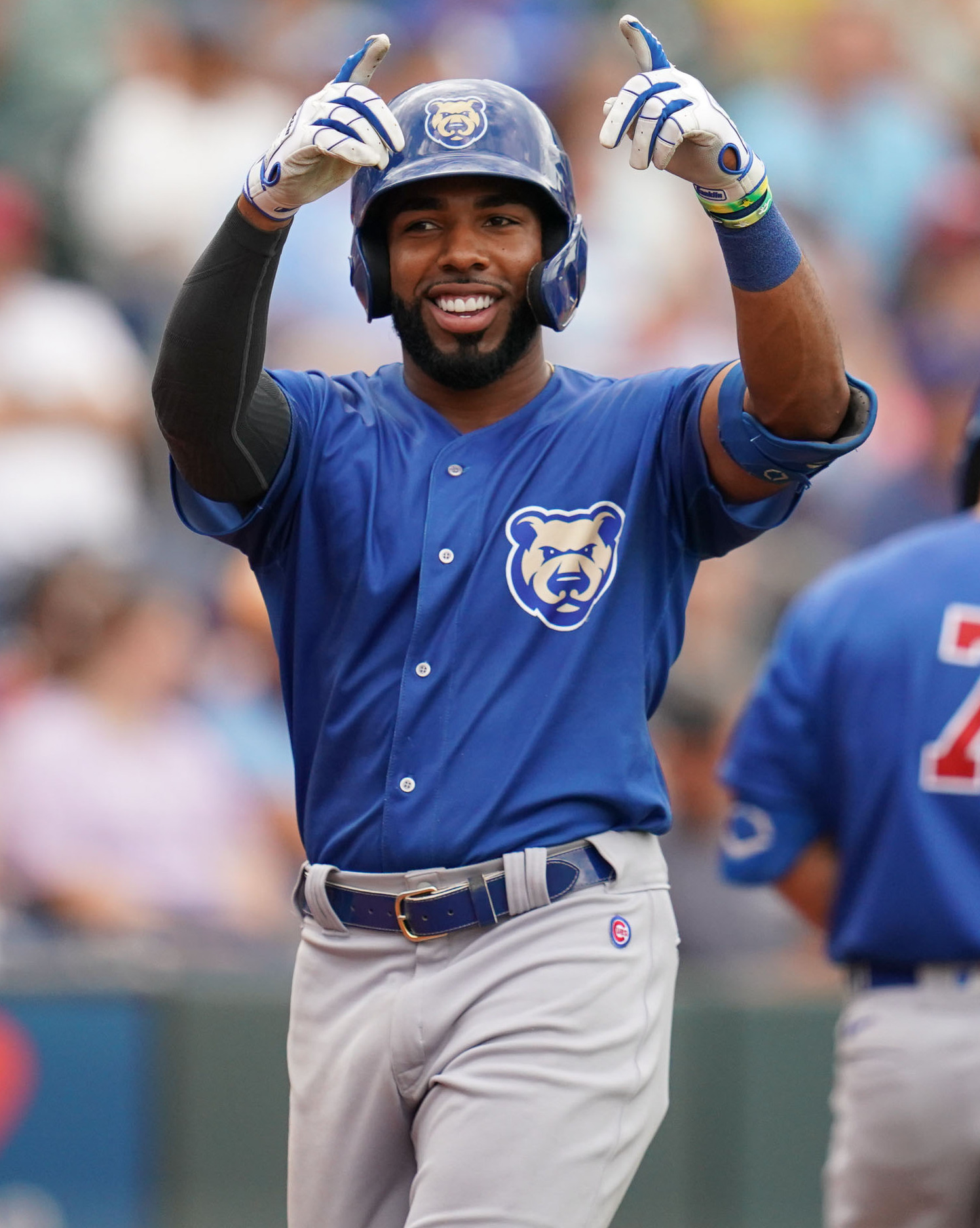
- Crook with the Iowa Cubs in 2022

Charleston Dirty Birds – No. 26
- Outfielder
- Born: July 12, 1995 (age 30); Nagua, Dominican Republic
- Bats: Right Throws: Right

MLB debut
- June 30, 2022, for the Chicago Cubs

MLB statistics (through 2022 season)
- Batting average: .250
- Home runs: 0
- Runs batted in: 2
- Stats at Baseball Reference

Teams
- Chicago Cubs (2022)

Narciso Crook (born July 12, 1995) is a Dominican professional baseball outfielder for the Charleston Dirty Birds of the Atlantic League of Professional Baseball. He has previously played in Major League Baseball (MLB) for the Chicago Cubs.

== Early life ==
Crook began playing baseball at 11 years old after moving to Trenton, New Jersey, from the Dominican Republic when his mother married former professional football player Al Darby. He played prep baseball at Trenton Central High School, from which he graduated in 2012, before moving on to Gloucester County College (since renamed as Rowan College of South Jersey).

== Career ==
=== Cincinnati Reds ===
Crook was selected by the Cincinnati Reds in the 23rd round, with the 705th overall selection, of the 2013 Major League Baseball draft. On July 5, Crook signed with the Reds. He made his professional debut in 2014 with the rookie–level Arizona League Reds, hitting .255/.313/.423 with 4 home runs, 20 RBI, and 12 stolen bases in 42 contests. He spent the 2015 season with the Single–A Dayton Dragons, playing in 105 contests and hitting .236/.270/.383 with 9 home runs, 47 RBI, and 13 stolen bases.

Crook returned to Dayton in 2016, playing in 23 games and batting .244/.311/.402 with 3 home runs and 7 RBI. On May 24, 2016, it was announced that Crook would miss the remainder of the season after undergoing surgery to repair a torn labrum in his left shoulder. He spent 2017 with the High–A Daytona Tortugas, but was limited to 36 games in which he hit .213/.275/.360 with 4 home runs and 17 RBI across 36 games. After Crook was placed on the disabled list on May 19, 2017, he did not make an appearance for the remainder of the year. Crook began the 2018 season with Dayton, progressing to Daytona and the Double–A Pensacola Blue Wahoos later in the year. In 103 games, he accumulated a .266/.344/.415 batting line with 6 home runs and 44 RBI.

In 2019, he began the year back in Double–A with the Chattanooga Lookouts, but was quickly promoted to the Triple-A Louisville Bats after 24 games. In 84 games for Louisville, he hit .273/.329/.484 with a career–high 10 home runs, 35 RBI, and 9 stolen bases. Crook did not play in a game in 2020 due to the cancellation of the minor league season because of the COVID-19 pandemic. He elected free agency following the season on November 2, 2020.

Crook re–signed with the Reds organization on a minor league contract on December 4, 2020. Returning to action in 2021, Crook split the year between Chattanooga and Louisville. In 100 total contests, he slashed .244/.355/.451 with career–highs in home runs (14) and RBI (54). He elected free agency following the 2021 season on November 7, 2021.

=== Chicago Cubs ===
On November 18, 2021, Crook signed a minor league contract with the Chicago Cubs organization. He began the 2022 season with the Triple-A Iowa Cubs, playing in 101 games, where he batted .260/.345/.492 with 19 home runs and 67 runs batted in (RBIs). On June 30, 2022, Crook was selected to the 40-man roster and promoted to the major leagues for the first time. In four games with Chicago, he went 2-for-8 with two RBI. On November 10, Crook was removed from the 40-man roster and sent outright to Triple–A Iowa; he elected free agency the same day.

=== Boston Red Sox ===
On November 22, 2022, Crook signed a minor-league contract with the Boston Red Sox organization. He was assigned to the Triple–A Worcester Red Sox to begin the 2023 season. In 93 games for Worcester, Crook batted .216/.335/.392 with 10 home runs, 36 RBI, and 11 stolen bases. He elected free agency following the season on November 6, 2023.

=== Tigres de Quintana Roo ===
On April 23, 2024, Crook signed with the Tigres de Quintana Roo of the Mexican League. In 6 games for the Tigres, he went 4–for–23 (.174) with one home run and one RBI. Crook was released by Quintana Roo on May 1.

=== Chicago Dogs ===
On May 7, 2024, Crook signed with the Chicago Dogs of the American Association of Professional Baseball. In 100 games for the Dogs, he slashed .264/.359/.534 with 26 home runs, 73 RBI, and 21 stolen bases. He became a free agent following the season.

=== Gastonia Ghost Peppers ===
On April 15, 2025, Crook signed with the Gastonia Ghost Peppers of the Atlantic League of Professional Baseball. In 61 appearances for Gastonia, Crook batted .320/.403/.604 with 14 home runs, 48 RBI, and 11 stolen bases.

=== Acereros de Monclova ===
On July 11, 2025, Crook signed with the Acereros de Monclova of the Mexican League. In 11 appearances for the Acereros, Crook batted .194/.341/.222 with four stolen bases and six walks.

=== Gastonia Ghost Peppers (second stint) ===
On August 5, 2025, Crook signed with the Gastonia Ghost Peppers of the Atlantic League of Professional Baseball. In his two combined stints with the Ghost Peppers he appeared in 96 total games, hitting .278/.372/.526 with 19 home runs, 70 RBI, and 28 stolen bases. Crook became a free agent following the season.

=== Charleston Dirty Birds ===
On April 18, 2026, Crook signed with the Charleston Dirty Birds of the Atlantic League of Professional Baseball.

== See also ==
- List of Major League Baseball players from the Dominican Republic
