= Johnny Washington (baseball coach) =

American baseball player & coach (born 1984)

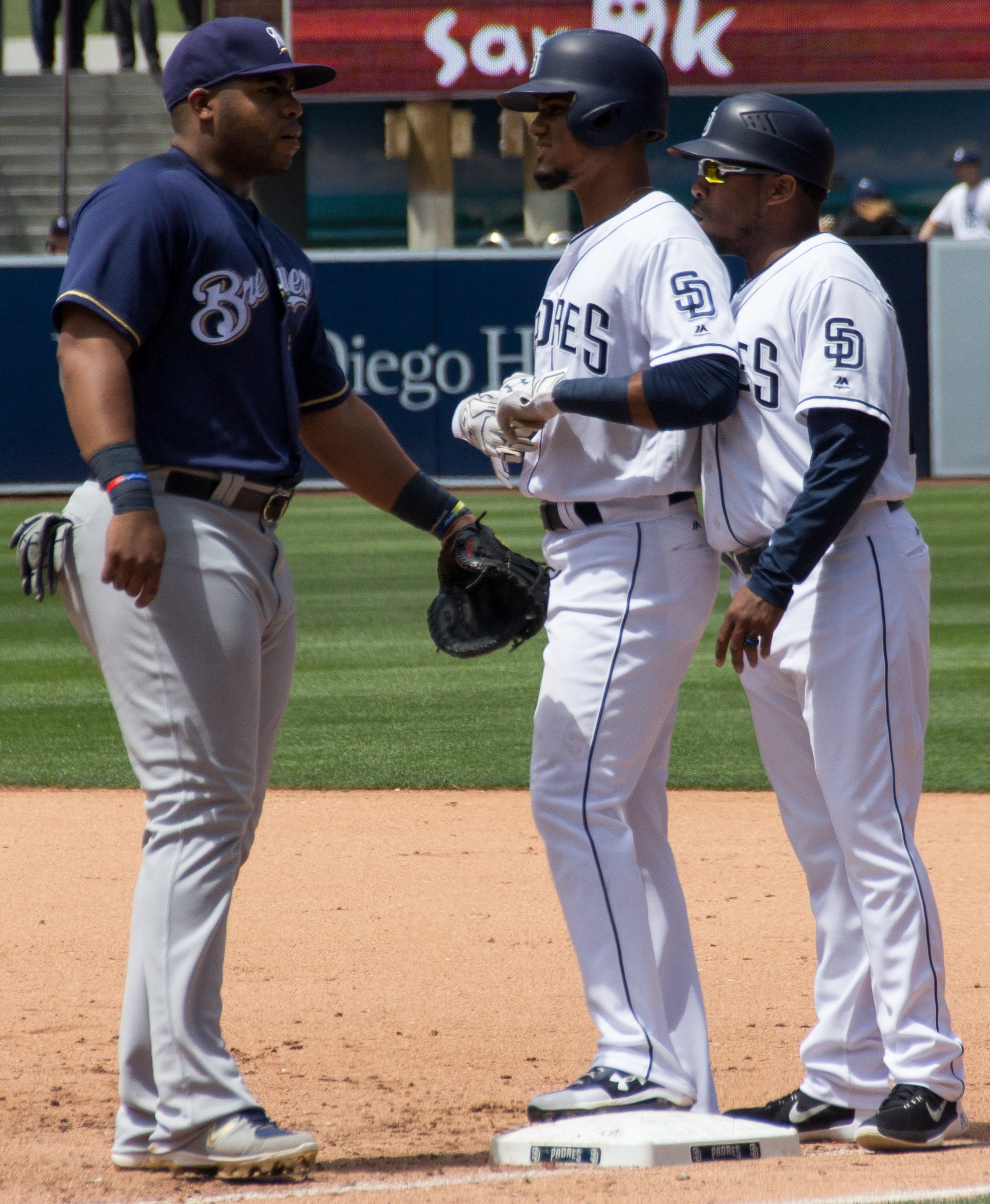
- Washington (right) with the San Diego Padres in 2017

New York Mets
- Infielder / Coach
- Born: May 6, 1984 (age 42); Long Beach, California
- Bats: Right Throws: Right
- Stats at Baseball Reference

Teams
- As coach: San Diego Padres (2017–2019); Hanwha Eagles (2021); Chicago Cubs (2022–2023); Los Angeles Angels (2024–2025); New York Mets (2027-present)

Johnny Washington (born May 6, 1984) is an American former professional baseball infielder and Major League Baseball (MLB) coach. A native of Long Beach, California, Washington was a second baseman and shortstop during his playing days. He threw and batted right-handed and was listed as 5 feet 11 inches (1.80 m) and 165 pounds (75 kg). He currently serves as the minor league hitting coordinator for the Atlanta Braves organization.

== Playing career ==
Washington attended Mt. San Jacinto College. The Texas Rangers selected him in the 27th round of the 2003 MLB draft, and he played in Minor League Baseball (MiLB) and independent league baseball for seven seasons.

== Coaching career ==
=== Los Angeles Dodgers ===
When he retired in 2009, he was hired by the Los Angeles Dodgers to coach in MiLB for the Ogden Raptors. In 2013, he coached for the Rancho Cucamonga Quakes. In 2014, he coached for the Great Lakes Loons.

=== San Diego Padres ===
He joined the San Diego Padres organization, and coached in 2016 for the San Antonio Missions. The Padres hired Washington to their MLB staff as their first base coach before the 2017 season. He was named as the Padres hitting coach for the 2019 season.

Washington interviewed for the Los Angeles Angels' managerial position following the 2019 season.

=== Hanwha Eagles ===
Washington was hired as hitting coach for the KBO League's Hanwha Eagles for the 2021 season.

=== Chicago Cubs ===
On December 13, 2021, Washington was hired by the Chicago Cubs to serve as the team's assistant hitting coach for the 2022 season.

=== Los Angeles Angels ===
On November 18, 2023, the Angels named Washington as their hitting coach. On October 23, 2025, the Angels announced that Washington would not be retained under new manager Kurt Suzuki.

=== Atlanta Braves ===
On January 14, 2026, Washington was hired to serve as the minor league hitting coordinator for the Atlanta Braves.

=== New York Mets ===
On November 5, 2026, Washington was hired to serve as the co-hitting coach for the New York Mets for the 2027 season.
