= 2021 Chicago Cubs season =

Major League Baseball season

2021 Chicago Cubs
- League: National League
- Division: Central
- Ballpark: Wrigley Field
- City: Chicago
- Record: 71–91 (.438)
- Divisional place: 4th
- Owners: Tom Ricketts
- President of baseball operations: Jed Hoyer
- General managers: Jed Hoyer
- Managers: David Ross
- Television: Marquee Sports Network (Jon "Boog" Sciambi, Jim Deshaies, Taylor McGregor, Ryan Dempster, Elise Menaker, Rick Sutcliffe, Pat Hughes, Beth Mowins, Chris Myers)
- Radio: WSCR; Chicago Cubs Radio Network (Pat Hughes, Ron Coomer, Zach Zaidman, Matt Spiegel)

The 2021 Chicago Cubs season was the 150th season of the Chicago Cubs franchise, the 146th in the National League, and the Cubs' 106th season at Wrigley Field. The Cubs were managed by David Ross, in his second year as Cubs manager, and played their home games at Wrigley Field as members of Major League Baseball's National League Central.

The Cubs began the season at home versus the Pittsburgh Pirates on April 1 and finished the season on the road on October 3 against their rivals, the St. Louis Cardinals. They finished the season 71–91 to finish in fourth place in the NL Central, 24 games out of first place. This marked only the second time the Cubs had failed to make the playoffs since 2014. The season also marked the first time since 2014 that the Cubs finished with a losing record and the first time since 2013 that the Cubs had lost 91 games.

The season marked the end of an era as the Cubs traded core members of the team that won the 2016 World Series (Javier Báez, Kris Bryant, and Anthony Rizzo) at the trade deadline. The Cubs set an MLB record for most players used in a season by a single team as 69 different players appeared for the Cubs.

== Previous season ==
The Cubs finished the 2020 season, which was limited due to the ongoing COVID-19 pandemic, with a record of 34–26 to win the Central Division by three games, marking the fifth time the Cubs had made the playoffs in the previous six years. As the No. 3 seed in the newly expanded playoffs, the Cubs were swept in the Wild Card Series by the Miami Marlins.

== COVID-19 effects on season ==
On February 9, 2021, MLB announced that the protocols in place for the season due to the continuing COVID-19 pandemic.

=== Rule changes ===
The season was similar to the prior season in that the following rules would be used due to COVID-19:

- Doubleheaders were two seven-inning games.
- In extra inning games, each team got a runner on second to start every inning.
- Active roster limit was limited to 26 and expanded to 28 in September.
- Each team was permitted to carry up to five additional taxi squad players on all road trips.

There was no universal designated hitter or expanded playoffs.

== Television broadcasts ==
On December 4, 2020, the team announced that longtime TV play-by-play broadcaster, Len Kasper, was leaving the broadcast booth to join the Chicago White Sox radio booth. Marquee Sports Network announced they would conduct a search to replace Kasper. On January 4, 2021, the Cubs announced that Jon "Boog" Sciambi would join color analyst Jim Deshaies as the play-by-play man in the Cubs booth. Due to Sciambi's national radio obligations, the team announced that Chris Myers, Beth Mowins, and Pat Hughes would act as fill-ins for Sciambi. On May 8, Mowins became the first woman to broadcast regular season games for the Cubs.

== Offseason ==
=== Front office changes ===
On November 17, 2020, President of Baseball Operations, Theo Epstein announced his resignation effective November 20. General manager Jed Hoyer took over Epstein's duties. Hoyer signed a five-year extension as the president of baseball operations on November 23. The Cubs promoted Jeff Greenberg and Craig Breslow to assistant general manager positions, but Hoyer announced the club would not hire a general manager prior to the 2021 season due to COVID-19 restrictions.

=== Transactions ===
On December 3, the Cubs announced that they would not tender a contract to OFs Kyle Schwarber and Albert Almora Jr. Schwarber later signed a one-year deal with the Washington Nationals. On December 28, the Cubs traded P Yu Darvish and C Víctor Caratini to the San Diego Padres for P Zach Davies and prospects.

==== October 2020 ====
October 3	Activated LHP Brailyn Marquez, OF Albert Almora Jr, C Miguel Amaya, LHP Rex Brothers, RHP Colin Rea, RHP Rowan Wick, RHP Dillon Maples, RHP Tyson Miller, RHP Duane Underwood Jr., RHP Tyler Chatwood, 1B Jose Martinez, and LHP Justin Steele.
October 4	Signed free agent RHP Juan Gamez to a minor league contract.
October 15	Signed free agents LHP Angel Hernandez, SS Leonel Espinoza, IF Andrews Cruz, RHP Yohan Crispin, RHP Joandy Duran, OF Jerry Torres, LHP Marino Santy, RHP Jose Romero, RHP Waimer Fabian, C Jose Herrera, and RHP Jose Lopez to minor league contracts.
October 21	Activated OF Mark Zagunis from the restricted list.
October 22	Sent OF Mark Zagunis outright to Iowa.
October 28	RHP Tyler Chatwood, IF Jason Kipnis, C Josh Phegley, LHP Jose Quintana, OF Cameron Maybin, RHP Jeremy Jeffress, OF Billy Hamilton, and LHP Andrew Chafin elected free agency.
October 30	Claimed IF Max Schrock off waivers from St. Louis Cardinals. Sent LHP Rex Brothers outright to Iowa.
October 31	IF Daniel Descalso elected free agency

==== November 2020 ====
November 2	Activated RHP Manuel Rodriguez, RHP James Norwood, and LHP Brad Wieck from the 60-day injured list.
November 5	Traded SS Ronny Simon to Arizona Diamondbacks to complete Andrew Chafin trade.
November 16	Signed free agents OF Rafael Ortega, RHP Jake Jewell, C Taylor Gushue, and LHP Jerry Vasto to minor league contracts.
November 17	Signed free agent OF Ian Miller to a minor league contract.
November 20	Selected the contract of RHP Cory Abbott and RHP Keegan Thompson from Myrtle Beach Pelicans. Selected the contract of 3B Christopher Morel from South Bend Cubs.

==== December 2020 ====
December 2	RHP Ryan Tepera, LF Kyle Schwarber, CF Albert Almora Jr., and 1B Jose Martinez elected free agency. Claimed RHP Robert Stock off waivers from Boston Red Sox.
December 10	Claimed RHP Gray Fenter off waivers from Norfolk Tides. Assigned RHP Samuel Reyes and RHP Nicholas Padilla to Cubs.
December 13	Signed free agent RHP James Bourque.
December 14	Signed free agent RHP Trevor Kelley.
December 16	Signed free agent IF Matt Duffy.
December 17	Signed free agent RHP Jonathan Holder.
December 22	Claimed OF Phillip Ervin off waivers from Seattle Mariners.
December 23	Signed free agent LHP Matt Dermody.
December 29	Traded RHP Yu Darvish, C Victor Caratini and $0 to San Diego Padres for CF Ismael Mena, SS Yelson Santana, SS Reginald Preciado, RHP Zach Davies, and OF Owen Caissie.

==== January 2021 ====
January 2	Signed free agent LF Nick Martini.
January 4	Released RHP Colin Rea.
January 5	Signed free agent 3B Patrick Wisdom.
January 15	Agreed to terms with 3B Kris Bryant, SS Javier Báez, and C Willson Contreras. Signed free agent C Carlos Ramos, P David Olivo, C Moises Ballesteros, P Welington Quintero, SS Cristian Hernandez, P Adrian Martinez, P Kenneddy Delgado, OF Daniel Ferreira, OF Oferman Hernandez, C Fredy Montenegro, P Zhiorman Imbriano, SS Pedro Ramirez, P Gabriel Agrazal, P Ronny Corniell, and P Joel Sierra.
January 21	Released LHP Matt Dermody.
January 22	Signed free agent C Austin Romine.
January 28	Signed free agent RHP Kohl Stewart.

==== February 2021 ====
February 5	Claimed SS Sergio Alcántara off waivers from Detroit Tigers. Signed free agent OF Joc Pederson, RHP Trevor Williams, LHP Andrew Chafin. Designated IF Max Schrock for assignment.
February 12	Signed free agent C José Lobatón, P Shelby Miller, and P Adam Morgan. 1B Alfonso Rivas, C P. J. Higgins, IF Trent Giambrone, P Brendon Little, P Michael Rucker, P Trevor Megill, and P Tommy Nance assigned to Chicago Cubs.
February 17	Re-signed free agent RHP Jake Arrieta. Placed LHP Kyle Ryan on 10-day injured list.
February 18	Signed free agent RHP Brandon Workman. Designated Sergio Alcántara for assignment.
February 20	Signed free agent OF Jake Marisnick. Designated OF Phillip Ervin for assignment. Sent SS Sergio Alcántara to Iowa.
February 23	Signed free agent OF Cameron Maybin.
February 26	Signed free agent P Ben Holmes.
February 27	Traded P Zach Bryant to Boston Red Sox. Signed free agent P Pedro Strop.
February 28	Activated LHP Kyle Ryan from 10-day IL. Designated P Robert Stock for assignment.

==== March 2021 ====
March 1	Assigned OF Brennen Davis, OF Cameron Maybin, C Taylor Payne, 2B Chase Strumpf, and 2B Andy Weber to Chicago Cubs. Signed free agent P Ryan Meisinger.
March 2	Sent P Robert Stock outright to Iowa. Designated RHP Duane Underwood Jr. for assignment. Signed free agent RHP Ryan Tepera.
March 5	Signed free agent 2B Eric Sogard.
March 7	Traded Duane Underwood Jr. to Pittsburgh Pirates for 1B Shendrik Apostel. Assigned P Robert Stock to Chicago Cubs.
March 12	Optioned P Cory Abbott, P Kohl Stewart, and P Tyson Miller to Iowa. Optioned P Manuel Rodriguez, SS Christopher Morel, and C Miguel Amaya to Tennessee Smokies. P Gray Fenter returned to Baltimore Orioles from Chicago Cubs.
March 15	Optioned P Keegan Thompson to Iowa.
March 19	Optioned RHP Justin Steele, RHP James Norwood, and LHP Kyle Ryan to Iowa. Optioned RHP Brailyn Marquez to Tennessee.
March 20	Assigned RHP Pedro Strop to Cubs.
March 26	Optioned LHP Brad Wieck to Iowa.
March 27	Released OF Cameron Maybin. Optioned SS Nico Hoerner to Iowa. Assigned P Ben Holmes to Cubs. Signed free agent C Erick Castillo.
March 28	Selected the contract of 2B Eric Sogard, 3B Matt Duffy, and LHP Rex Brothers from Iowa. Designated 2B Ildemaro Vargas for assignment. Released P Jerry Vasto.
March 29	OF Cameron Maybin and P Ryan Meisinger assigned to Cubs. Signed free agent SS Andrew Romine.
March 31	Signed C Tony Wolters. Designated P James Norwood for assignment. Sent 2B Ildemaro Vargas outright to Iowa.

== Regular season ==
=== Game log ===
2021 regular season game log: 71–91 (Home: 39–42; Away: 32–49)
April: 11–15 (Home: 8–7; Away: 3–8)

#	Date	Opponent	Score	Win	Loss	Save	Attendance	Record	Box/ Streak
1	April 1	Pirates	3–5	Howard (1–0)	**Hendricks** (0–1)	Rodríguez (1)	10,343	0–1	L1
2	April 3	Pirates	5–1	**Arrieta** (1–0)	Anderson (0–1)	—	10,343	1–1	W1
3	April 4	Pirates	4–3	**Davies** (1–0)	Keller (0–1)	**Kimbrel** (1)	10,343	2–1	W2
4	April 5	Brewers	5–3	**Williams** (1–0)	Anderson (0–1)	**Mills** (1)	10,343	3–1	W3
5	April 6	Brewers	0–4	Peralta (1–0)	**Alzolay** (0–1)	—	10,343	3–2	L1
6	April 7	Brewers	2–4 (10)	Hader (1–0)	**Workman** (0–1)	Boxberger (1)	10,343	3–3	L2
7	April 8	@ Pirates	4–2	**Arrieta** (2–0)	Anderson (0–2)	**Kimbrel** (2)	7,749	4–3	W1
8	April 10	@ Pirates	2–8	Keller (1–1)	**Davies** (1–1)	—	7,052	4–4	L1
9	April 11	@ Pirates	1–7	Brubaker (1–0)	**Williams** (1–1)	—	6,851	4–5	L2
10	April 12	@ Brewers	3–6	Peralta (2–0)	**Alzolay** (0–2)	Hader (1)	11,209	4–6	L3
11	April 13	@ Brewers	3–2	**Strop** (1–0)	Suter (0–1)	**Kimbrel** (3)	11,025	5–6	W1
12	April 14	@ Brewers	0–7	Burnes (1–1)	**Arrieta** (2–1)	—	10,598	5–7	L1
13	April 16	Braves	2–5	Tomlin (2–0)	**Davies** (1–2)	Smith (3)	10,343	5–8	L2
14	April 17	Braves	13–4	**Williams** (2–1)	Ynoa (0–1)	—	10,343	6–8	W1
15	April 18	Braves	4–13	Wilson (1–0)	**Hendricks** (0–2)	—	10,343	6–9	L1
16	April 20	Mets	3–1	**Arrieta** (3–1)	Walker (0–1)	**Kimbrel** (4)	10,137	7–9	W1
17	April 21	Mets	16–4	**Mills** (1–0)	Peterson (1–2)	—	10,196	8–9	W2
18	April 22	Mets	4–3 (10)	**Winkler** (1–0)	Díaz (1–1)	—	10,343	9–9	W3
19	April 23	Brewers	15–2	**Hendricks** (1–2)	Anderson (2–2)	—	10,343	10–9	W4
20	April 24	Brewers	3–4	Suter (2–1)	**Chafin** (0–1)	Hader (4)	10,343	10–10	L1
21	April 25	Brewers	0–6	Woodruff (2–0)	**Arrieta** (3–2)	—	10,343	10–11	L2
22	April 26	@ Braves	7–8	Morton (2–1)	**Workman** (0–2)	Smith (5)	17,956	10–12	L3
23	April 27	@ Braves	0–5	Anderson (2–0)	**Williams** (2–2)	—	17,603	10–13	L4
24	April 28	@ Braves	0–10	Ynoa (2–1)	**Hendricks** (1–3)	—	18,709	10–14	L5
25	April 29	@ Braves	9–3	**Alzolay** (1–2)	Wilson (1–2)	—	19,661	11–14	W1
26	April 30	@ Reds	6–8	Miley (3–2)	**Arrieta** (3–3)	Antone (1)	16,090	11–15	L1

May: 19–8 (Home: 11–3; Away: 8–5)

#	Date	Opponent	Score	Win	Loss	Save	Attendance	Record	Box/ Streak
27	May 1	@ Reds	3–2	**Brothers** (1–0)	Castillo (1–3)	**Kimbrel** (5)	17,077	12–15	W1
28	May 2	@ Reds	12–13 (10)	Hendrix (2–0)	**Kimbrel** (0–1)	—	16,755	12–16	L1
—	May 3	Dodgers	Postponed (rain, makeup May 4)						
29	May 4 (1)	Dodgers	7–1 (7)	**Hendricks** (2–3)	Kershaw (4–3)	—	10,295	13–16	W1
30	May 4 (2)	Dodgers	4–3 (9)	**Steele** (1–0)	Cleavinger (0–2)	—	10,343	14–16	W2
31	May 5	Dodgers	6–5 (11)	**Mills** (2–0)	Cleavinger (0–3)	—	10,343	15–16	W3
32	May 7	Pirates	3–2	**Davies** (2–2)	Cahill (1–4)	**Brothers** (1)	10,343	16–16	W4
33	May 8	Pirates	3–2	**Thompson** (1–0)	Howard (2–2)	**Kimbrel** (6)	10,343	17–16	W5
34	May 9	Pirates	5–6	Anderson (3–3)	**Hendricks** (2–4)	Rodríguez (6)	10,343	17–17	L1
35	May 11	@ Indians	2–3	Bieber (4–2)	**Alzolay** (1–3)	Clase (7)	8,024	17–18	L2
36	May 12	@ Indians	1–2 (10)	Karinchak (1–0)	**Thompson** (1–1)	—	8,589	17–19	L3
37	May 14	@ Tigers	4–2	**Arrieta** (4–3)	Skubal (0–6)	**Kimbrel** (7)	8,000	18–19	W1
38	May 15	@ Tigers	8–9 (10)	Fulmer (3–2)	**Kimbrel** (0–2)	—	8,000	18–20	L1
39	May 16	@ Tigers	5–1	**Hendricks** (3–4)	Boyd (2–4)	—	8,000	19–20	W1
40	May 17	Nationals	7–3	**Alzolay** (2–3)	Lester (0–2)	—	11,144	20–20	W2
41	May 18	Nationals	6–3	**Thompson** (2–1)	Harris (0–1)	**Kimbrel** (8)	11,142	21–20	W3
42	May 19	Nationals	3–4	Scherzer (4–2)	**Arrieta** (4–4)	Hand (5)	11,145	21–21	L1
43	May 20	Nationals	5–2	**Steele** (2–0)	Ross (2–4)	**Kimbrel** (9)	11,143	22–21	W1
44	May 21	@ Cardinals	12–3	**Hendricks** (4–4)	Helsley (3–2)	—	24,282	23–21	W2
45	May 22	@ Cardinals	1–2	Cabrera (1–1)	**Alzolay** (2–4)	Reyes (14)	26,027	23–22	L1
46	May 23	@ Cardinals	2–1 (10)	**Kimbrel** (1–2)	Reyes (2–1)	—	24,082	24–22	W1
47	May 25	@ Pirates	4–3	**Arrieta** (5–4)	Ponce (0–1)	**Kimbrel** (10)	6,750	25–22	W2
48	May 26	@ Pirates	4–1	**Williams** (3–2)	Crowe (0–3)	**Kimbrel** (11)	5,660	26–22	W3
49	May 27	@ Pirates	5–3	**Hendricks** (5–4)	Anderson (3–5)	**Tepera** (1)	7,202	27–22	W4
50	May 28	Reds	1–0	**Alzolay** (3–4)	Gutiérrez (0–1)	**Kimbrel** (12)	18,478	28–22	W5
51	May 29	Reds	10–2	**Thompson** (3–1)	Castillo (1–8)	—	24,275	29–22	W6
52	May 30	Reds	1–5	Mahle (4–2)	**Arrieta** (5–5)	Antone (3)	24,824	29–23	L1
53	May 31	Padres	7–2	**Stewart** (1–0)	Paddack (2–4)	—	24,824	30–23	W1

June: 12–16 (Home: 7–3; Away: 5–13)

#	Date	Opponent	Score	Win	Loss	Save	Attendance	Record	Box/ Streak
54	June 1	Padres	4–3	**Hendricks** (6–4)	Weathers (2–2)	**Kimbrel** (13)	24,824	31–23	W2
55	June 2	Padres	6–1	**Alzolay** (4–4)	Johnson (1–2)	—	24,824	32–23	W3
56	June 3	@ Giants	2–7	DeSclafani (5–2)	**Davies** (2–3)	—	10,737	32–24	L1
57	June 4	@ Giants	5–8	Menez (1–0)	**Arrieta** (5–6)	Rogers (7)	11,524	32–25	L2
58	June 5	@ Giants	3–4	Gausman (7–0)	**Stewart** (1–1)	Rogers (8)	12,792	32–26	L3
59	June 6	@ Giants	4–3	**Hendricks** (7–4)	Cueto (4–2)	**Kimbrel** (14)	14,089	33–26	W1
60	June 7	@ Padres	4–9	Weathers (3–2)	**Alzolay** (4–5)	—	15,250	33–27	L1
61	June 8	@ Padres	7–1	**Davies** (3–3)	Lamet (1–1)	—	16,207	34–27	W1
62	June 9	@ Padres	3–1	**Brothers** (2–0)	Darvish (6–2)	**Kimbrel** (15)	15,250	35–27	W2
63	June 11	Cardinals	8–5	**Nance** (1–0)	Cabrera (1–2)	**Kimbrel** (16)	35,112	36–27	W3
64	June 12	Cardinals	7–2	**Hendricks** (8–4)	Gant (4–4)	**Kimbrel** (17)	39,095	37–27	W4
65	June 13	Cardinals	2–0	**Davies** (4–3)	Martínez (3–7)	**Kimbrel** (18)	35,225	38–27	W5
66	June 14	@ Mets	2–5	Peterson (2–5)	**Arrieta** (5–7)	Díaz (13)	16,383	38–28	L1
67	June 15	@ Mets	2–3	Walker (6–2)	**Mills** (2–1)	Lugo (1)	17,804	38–29	L2
68	June 16	@ Mets	3–6	Reid-Foley (2–0)	**Stock** (0–1)	Díaz (14)	23,545	38–30	L3
69	June 17	@ Mets	2–0	**Hendricks** (9–4)	Stroman (6–5)	**Kimbrel** (19)	16,826	39–30	W1
70	June 18	Marlins	2–10	Curtiss (3–1)	**Davies** (4–4)	—	32,505	39–31	L1
71	June 19	Marlins	1–11	López (3–4)	**Arrieta** (5–8)	—	35,846	39–32	L2
72	June 20	Marlins	2–0	**Mills** (3–1)	Thompson (2–1)	**Kimbrel** (20)	37,158	40–32	W1
73	June 21	Indians	0–4	Shaw (2–2)	**Alzolay** (4–6)	—	32,934	40–33	L1
74	June 22	Indians	7–1	**Hendricks** (10–4)	Morgan (0–2)	—	35,493	41–33	W1
75	June 24	@ Dodgers	4–0	**Davies** (5–4)	Buehler (7–1)	—	52,175	42–33	W2
76	June 25	@ Dodgers	2–6	Treinen (2–3)	**Tepera** (0–1)	—	49,387	42–34	L1
77	June 26	@ Dodgers	2–3	Price (3–0)	**Thompson** (3–2)	—	45,420	42–35	L2
78	June 27	@ Dodgers	1–7	Kershaw (9–7)	**Alzolay** (4–7)	—	46,315	42–36	L3
79	June 28	@ Brewers	4–14	Williams (5–1)	**Tepera** (0–2)	—	30,251	42–37	L4
80	June 29	@ Brewers	1–2	Woodruff (7–3)	**Davies** (5–5)	Hader (20)	24,423	42–38	L5
81	June 30	@ Brewers	7–15	Richards (3–0)	**Brothers** (2–1)	—	32,193	42–39	L6

July: 9–16 (Home: 5–8; Away: 4–8)

#	Date	Opponent	Score	Win	Loss	Save	Attendance	Record	Box/ Streak
82	July 2	@ Reds	1–2	Osich (1–0)	**Mills** (3–2)	Hembree (2)	40,854	42–40	L7
83	July 3	@ Reds	2–3	Hendrix (4–1)	**Alzolay** (4–8)	Hembree (3)	36,815	42–41	L8
84	July 4	@ Reds	2–3	Warren (2–0)	**Winkler** (1–1)	Garrett (6)	29,340	42–42	L9
85	July 5	Phillies	3–13	Brogdon (5–2)	**Brothers** (2–2)	—	37,165	42–43	L10
86	July 6	Phillies	10–15	Nola (6–5)	**Arrieta** (5–9)	—	30,095	42–44	L11
87	July 7	Phillies	8–3	**Mills** (4–2)	Wheeler (6–5)	—	28,860	43–44	W1
88	July 8	Phillies	0–8	Eflin (4–6)	**Alzolay** (4–9)	—	30,727	43–45	L1
89	July 9	Cardinals	10–5	**Hendricks** (11–4)	LeBlanc (0–2)	—	36,192	44–45	W1
90	July 10	Cardinals	0–6	Kim (4–5)	**Davies** (5–6)	—	39,368	44–46	L1
—	July 11	Cardinals	Postponed (rain, makeup September 24)						
ASG	July 13	AL @ NL	5–2	Ohtani (1–0)	Burnes (0–1)	Hendriks (1)	49,184	44–46	N/A
91	July 16	@ Diamondbacks	5–1	**Hendricks** (12–4)	Bumgarner (4–6)	—	22,046	45–46	W1
92	July 17	@ Diamondbacks	4–2	**Brothers** (3–2)	Soria (1–4)	**Kimbrel** (21)	20,180	46–46	W2
93	July 18	@ Diamondbacks	4–6	Kelly (6–7)	**Winkler** (1–2)	Soria (4)	21,457	46–47	L1
94	July 19	@ Cardinals	3–8	Woodford (2–1)	**Mills** (4–3)	—	38,199	46–48	L2
95	July 20	@ Cardinals	7–6	**Maples** (1–0)	Reyes (5–4)	**Kimbrel** (22)	35,402	47–48	W1
96	July 21	@ Cardinals	2–3 (10)	McFarland (1–0)	**Kimbrel** (1–3)	—	37,008	47–49	L1
97	July 22	@ Cardinals	2–3	Kim (6–5)	**Alzolay** (4–10)	Reyes (23)	41,412	47–50	L2
98	July 23	Diamondbacks	8–3	**Davies** (6–6)	Gallen (1–5)	**Thompson** (1)	34,059	48–50	W1
99	July 24	Diamondbacks	3–7	Kelly (7–7)	**Chafin** (0–2)	—	37,190	48–51	L1
100	July 25	Diamondbacks	5–1	**Williams** (4–2)	Smith (3–7)	**Kimbrel** (23)	32,602	49–51	W1
101	July 26	Reds	6–5	**Kimbrel** (2–3)	Hembree (2–5)	—	29,215	50–51	W2
102	July 27	Reds	4–7	Gutiérrez (5–3)	**Alzolay** (4–11)	—	28,153	50–52	L1
103	July 28	Reds	2–8	Mahle (8–3)	**Davies** (6–7)	—	30,134	50–53	L2
104	July 29	Reds	4–7	Castillo (5–10)	**Mills** (4–4)	—	32,793	50–54	L3
105	July 30	@ Nationals	3–4	Espino (3–2)	**Arrieta** (5–10)	Finnegan (2)	33,882	50–55	L4
106	July 31	@ Nationals	6–3	**Hendricks** (13–4)	Ross (5–9)	**Ryan** (1)	31,444	51–55	W1

August: 7–20 (Home: 2–11; Away: 5–9)

#	Date	Opponent	Score	Win	Loss	Save	Attendance	Record	Box/ Streak
107	August 1	@ Nationals	5–6	Finnegan (4–2)	**Rodríguez** (0–1)	—	25,520	51–56	L1
108	August 3	@ Rockies	6–13	Freeland (2–6)	**Davies** (6–8)	—	38,188	51–57	L2
109	August 4	@ Rockies	3–2	**Mills** (5–4)	Gray (7–7)	**Rodríguez** (1)	36,205	52–57	W1
110	August 5	@ Rockies	5–6	Kinley (2–2)	**Jewell** (0–1)	Bard (17)	30,462	52–58	L1
111	August 6	White Sox	6–8 (10)	Hendriks (6–2)	**Rodríguez** (0–2)	—	39,539	52–59	L2
112	August 7	White Sox	0–4	Rodón (9–5)	**Alzolay** (4–12)	—	40,077	52–60	L3
113	August 8	White Sox	3–9	Cease (9–6)	**Davies** (6–9)	—	39,412	52–61	L4
—	August 9	Brewers	Postponed (rain, makeup August 10)						
114	August 10 (1)	Brewers	2–4 (7)	Peralta (9–3)	**Steele** (2–1)	Williams (2)	29,031	52–62	L5
115	August 10 (2)	Brewers	3–6 (7)	Sánchez (1–0)	**Winkler** (1–3)	—	28,674	52–63	L6
116	August 11	Brewers	0–10	Burnes (7–4)	**Arrieta** (5–11)	—	29,619	52–64	L7
117	August 12	Brewers	4–17	Strickland (1–1)	**Hendricks** (13–5)	—	32,502	52–65	L8
118	August 13	@ Marlins	10–14	Luzardo (4–5)	**Alzolay** (4–13)	—	11,728	52–66	L9
119	August 14	@ Marlins	4–5	Floro (4–4)	**Heuer** (4–2)	Bender (3)	11,225	52–67	L10
120	August 15	@ Marlins	1–4	Campbell (1–2)	**Mills** (5–5)	Floro (5)	10,262	52–68	L11
121	August 16	@ Reds	5–14	Miley (10–4)	**Steele** (2–2)	—	15,404	52–69	L12
122	August 17	@ Reds	2–1	**Hendricks** (14–5)	Gutiérrez (8–4)	**Heuer** (1)	13,989	53–69	W1
123	August 18	@ Reds	7–1	**Rodríguez** (1–2)	Mahle (10–4)	—	16,922	54–69	W2
124	August 20	Royals	2–6	Keller (8–12)	**Davies** (6–10)	—	31,835	54–70	L1
125	August 21	Royals	2–4	Bubic (4–6)	**Thompson** (3–3)	Barlow (8)	34,005	54–71	L2
126	August 22	Royals	1–9	Hernández (4–1)	**Mills** (5–6)	—	29,640	54–72	L3
127	August 23	Rockies	6–4	**Rodríguez** (2–2)	Bard (7–6)	—	25,577	55–72	W1
—	August 24	Rockies	Postponed (rain, makeup August 25)						
128	August 25 (1)	Rockies	5–2 (7)	**Heuer** (5–2)	Gomber (9–8)	**Morgan** (1)	24,161	56–72	W2
129	August 25 (2)	Rockies	10–13 (10)	Bowden (3–2)	**Jewell** (0–2)	—	24,936	56–73	L1
130	August 27	@ White Sox	13–17	López (3–1)	**Sampson** (0–1)	—	37,892	56–74	L2
131	August 28	@ White Sox	7–0	**Mills** (6–6)	Lynn (10–4)	—	38,668	57–74	W1
132	August 29	@ White Sox	1–13	Cease (11–6)	**Hendricks** (14–6)	—	38,565	57–75	L1
133	August 31	@ Twins	3–1	**Rodríguez** (3–2)	Gant (4–9)	**Wick** (1)	22,224	58–75	W1

September/October: 13–16 (Home: 6–10; Away: 7–6)

#	Date	Opponent	Score	Win	Loss	Save	Attendance	Record	Box/ Streak
134	September 1	@ Twins	3–0	**Steele** (3–2)	Ryan (0–1)	**Alzolay** (1)	21,784	59–75	W2
135	September 2	Pirates	6–5 (11)	**Heuer** (6–2)	Howard (2–3)	—	26,963	60–75	W3
136	September 3	Pirates	6–5	**Megill** (1–0)	Miller (0–1)	**Wick** (2)	24,441	61–75	W4
137	September 4	Pirates	7–6	**Effross** (1–0)	Stratton (5–1)	—	30,020	62–75	W5
138	September 5	Pirates	11–8	**Alzolay** (5–13)	Howard (2–4)	**Wick** (3)	30,155	63–75	W6
139	September 6	Reds	4–3	**Effross** (2–0)	Lorenzen (0–2)	**Morgan** (2)	27,289	64–75	W7
140	September 7	Reds	3–4	Miley (12–5)	**Sampson** (0–2)	Givens (6)	24,925	64–76	L1
141	September 8	Reds	4–1 (10)	**Heuer** (7–2)	Brach (1–2)	—	25,861	65–76	W1
142	September 10	Giants	1–6	Doval (2–1)	**Megill** (1–1)	—	29,439	65–77	L1
143	September 11	Giants	4–15	Gausman (14–5)	**Davies** (6–11)	Baragar (2)	34,723	65–78	L2
144	September 12	Giants	5–6	Webb (10–3)	**Steele** (3–3)	McGee (31)	32,021	65–79	L3
145	September 14	@ Phillies	6–3	**Sampson** (1–2)	Gibson (10–7)	**Wick** (4)	16,170	66–79	W1
146	September 15	@ Phillies	5–6	Kennedy (2–1)	**Megill** (1–2)	—	16,299	66–80	L1
147	September 16	@ Phillies	8–17	Neris (3–6)	**Rodríguez** (3–3)	—	20,208	66–81	L2
148	September 17	@ Brewers	5–8	Ashby (3–0)	**Wick** (0–1)	Hader (32)	28,483	66–82	L3
149	September 18	@ Brewers	4–6	Williams (8–2)	**Effross** (2–1)	Hader (33)	33,625	66–83	L4
150	September 19	@ Brewers	6–4	**Morgan** (1–0)	Boxberger (5–4)	**Rucker** (1)	34,213	67–83	W1
151	September 21	Twins	5–9	Barraclough (2–0)	**Mills** (6–7)	—	25,594	67–84	L1
152	September 22	Twins	4–5	Ryan (2–1)	**Hendricks** (14–7)	Colomé (15)	24,402	67–85	L2
153	September 24 (1)	Cardinals	5–8 (7)	Reyes (10–8)	**Steele** (3–4)	Gallegos (13)	29,030	67–86	L3
154	September 24 (2)	Cardinals	4–12 (7)	Hudson (1–0)	**Davies** (6–12)	—	35,020	67–87	L4
155	September 25	Cardinals	5–8	Kim (7–7)	**Heuer** (7–3)	—	32,918	67–88	L5
156	September 26	Cardinals	2–4	Cabrera (4–5)	**Heuer** (7–4)	Gallegos (14)	26,547	67–89	L6
157	September 28	@ Pirates	6–8	De Los Santos (2–1)	**Morgan** (1–1)	Stratton (7)	9,218	67–90	L7
158	September 29	@ Pirates	3–2	**Morgan** (2–1)	Shreve (3–3)	**Heuer** (2)	9,236	68–90	W1
159	September 30	@ Pirates	9–0	**Steele** (4–4)	Yajure (0–2)	—	10,152	69–90	W2
160	October 1	@ Cardinals	3–4	Gallegos (6–5)	**Nance** (1–1)	—	41,618	69–91	L1
161	October 2	@ Cardinals	6–5	**Adam** (1–0)	García (1–1)	**Wick** (5)	45,239	70–91	W1
162	October 3	@ Cardinals	3–2 (7)	**Biagini** (1–0)	Woodford (3–4)	—	46,525	71–91	W2

Legend: = Win = Loss = Postponement
Bold = Cubs team member

=== Season standings ===
NL Central
Team	W	L	Pct.	GB	Home	Road
Milwaukee Brewers	95	67	.586	—	45‍–‍36	50‍–‍31
St. Louis Cardinals	90	72	.556	5	45‍–‍36	45‍–‍36
Cincinnati Reds	83	79	.512	12	44‍–‍37	39‍–‍42
Chicago Cubs	71	91	.438	24	39‍–‍42	32‍–‍49
Pittsburgh Pirates	61	101	.377	34	37‍–‍44	24‍–‍57

Division leaders
Team	W	L	Pct.
San Francisco Giants	107	55	.660
Milwaukee Brewers	95	67	.586
Atlanta Braves	88	73	.547

Wild Card teams (Top 2 teams qualify for postseason)
Team	W	L	Pct.	GB
Los Angeles Dodgers	106	56	.654	+16
St. Louis Cardinals	90	72	.556	—
Cincinnati Reds	83	79	.512	7
Philadelphia Phillies	82	80	.506	8
San Diego Padres	79	83	.488	11
New York Mets	77	85	.475	13
Colorado Rockies	74	87	.460	15½
Chicago Cubs	71	91	.438	19
Miami Marlins	67	95	.414	23
Washington Nationals	65	97	.401	25
Pittsburgh Pirates	61	101	.377	29
Arizona Diamondbacks	52	110	.321	38

=== Record vs. opponents ===
2021 National League record Source: MLB Standings Grid – 2021
Team	AZ	ATL	CHC	CIN	COL	LAD	MIA	MIL	NYM	PHI	PIT	SD	SF	STL	WSH	AL
Arizona	—	3–4	2–4	5–1	9–10	3–16	2–5	1–6	1–5	4–3	4–2	8–11	2–17	1–6	3–4	4–16
Atlanta	4–3	—	5–2	4–3	2–4	2–4	11–8	3–3	10–9	10–9	4–3	4–2	3–3	6–1	14–5	6–14
Chicago	4–2	2–5	—	8–11	3–3	4–3	1–5	4–15	4–3	2–5	14–5	5–1	1–6	9–10	4–3	6–14
Cincinnati	1–5	3–4	11–8	—	5–2	3–3	5–2	9–10	3–3	4–2	13–6	1–6	1–6	10–9	5–2	9–11
Colorado	10–9	4–2	3–3	2–5	—	6–13	4–2	2–5	2–5	5–2	4–2	11–8	4–15	3–4	4–2	10–10
Los Angeles	16–3	4–2	3–4	3–3	13–6	—	3–4	4–3	6–1	4–2	6–0	12–7	9–10	4–3	7–0	12–8
Miami	5–2	8–11	5–1	2–5	2–4	4–3	—	3–3	9–10	10–9	2–5	3–4	3–4	0–6	8–11	3–17
Milwaukee	6–1	3–3	15–4	10–9	5–2	3–4	3–3	—	4–2	2–5	14–5	5–2	4–3	8–11	5–1	8–12
New York	5–1	9–10	3–4	3–3	5–2	1–6	10–9	2–4	—	9–10	3–4	4–3	1–5	2–5	11–8	9–11
Philadelphia	3–4	9–10	5–2	2–4	2–5	2–4	9–10	5–2	10–9	—	4–3	4–2	2–4	4–3	13–6	8–12
Pittsburgh	2–4	3–4	5–14	6–13	2–4	0–6	5–2	5–14	4–3	3–4	—	3–4	4–3	7–12	2–4	10–10
San Diego	11–8	2–4	1–5	6–1	8–11	7–12	4–3	2–5	3–4	2–4	4–3	—	8–11	3–3	4–3	14–6
San Francisco	17–2	3–3	6–1	6–1	15–4	10–9	4–3	3–4	5–1	4–2	3–4	11–8	—	2–4	5–2	13–7
St. Louis	6–1	1–6	10–9	9–10	4–3	3–4	6–0	11–8	5–2	3–4	12–7	3–3	4–2	—	2–4	11–9
Washington	4–3	5–14	3–4	2–5	2–4	0–7	11–8	1–5	8–11	6–13	4–2	3–4	2–5	4–2	—	10–10

=== Opening Day starters ===
Thursday, April 1, 2021, vs. Pittsburgh Pirates at Wrigley Field

Name	Pos.
Ian Happ	CF
Willson Contreras	C
Anthony Rizzo	1B
Kris Bryant	3B
Joc Pederson	LF
Javier Báez	SS
Jason Heyward	RF
David Bote	2B
Kyle Hendricks	P

=== Season summary ===
==== March ====
- **March 23** – The Cubs announced that Kyle Hendricks would be the Opening Day starter for the second consecutive year.

==== April ====
- **April 1** – The Cubs opened the season at home against the Pittsburgh Pirates. Cub pitching struggled as Kyle Hendricks lasted only three innings while walking three and giving up three runs. Meanwhile, seven relievers walked eight batters and gave up two more Pirate runs. The Cub offense pushed across three runs on RBIs by Anthony Rizzo, Joc Pederson, and Willson Contreras. But, it was not enough as the Cubs lost the opener 5–3.
- **April 3** – After an off day, Jake Arrieta made the start in his return to the Cubs and allowed only one run in six innings. Meanwhile, Kris Bryant and Jason Heyward hit solo home runs to provide all the offense Arrieta and the bullpen needed. Craig Kimbrel struck out the side in the ninth to secure the 5–1 win. A day after walking 11 Pirates, the Cubs walked only one while striking seven of the last nine batters of the game.
- **April 4** – Kris Bryant and Joc Pederson drove in runs in the first and Ian Happ homered in the third to stake new Cubs starter Zach Davies to an early lead. However, Davies surrendered a two-run homer in the sixth to narrow the Cub lead to 3–2. Bryant scored on an error in the sixth to extend the Cub lead to two before the bullpen allowed a run in the eighth to again narrow the lead to one. Craig Kimbrel pitched his second consecutive perfect inning to notch his second save as the Cubs beat the Pirates 4–3.
- **April 5** – With the Milwaukee Brewers in town, new Cub starter Trevor Williams pitched a perfect game into the sixth before allowing two runs in the seventh. Meanwhile, Willson Contreras hit a two-run homer in the fourth while Javier Báez and David Bote each hit solo homers in the fourth as well to give the Cubs a 4–0 lead. Leading 4–3 in the seventh, Eric Sogard tripled to drive in a run and push the Cub lead to 5–3. Alec Mills pitched a perfect ninth for the save as the Cubs won 5–3.
- **April 6** – Adbert Alzolay gave up four runs on four hits in five innings against the Brewers while the Cub offense managed only one hit, a double by Kris Bryant, losing 4–0.
- **April 7** – In the final game against the Brewers, Kyle Hendricks pitched much better, going six innings without allowing a run. Trailing 1–0 in the eighth, Joc Pederson got his first hit as a Cub, a solo home run to tie the game. Going into extra innings for the first time on the season, Lorenzo Cain homered in the 10th to give the Brewers a 4–1 lead. The Cubs managed to push across the runner starting the inning at second in the bottom of the 10th, but left the bases loaded when Ian Happ popped out to end the game with the Cubs losing 4–2.
- **April 8** – Taking to the road for the first time on the season, the Cubs traveled to Pittsburgh to face the Pirates. Jake Arrieta pitched well again for the Cubs, going six innings and allowing only two runs. For only the fifth time ever, Javier Báez, Kris Bryant, and Anthony Rizzo homered in the same game as the Cubs won 4–2. Craig Kimbrel pitched his first-ever five-out save in the regular season as the Cubs moved to a game over .500 on the season.
- **April 10** – After an off day, the Cubs offensive woes continued in game two of the series against Pittsburgh, managing only two runs. Zach Davies gave up seven runs in 1.2 innings as the Cubs were blown out 8–2. The loss dropped the Cubs back to .500 on the season.
- **April 11** – Trevor Williams gave up five runs in three innings and the Cub bullpen surrendered another two runs. Meanwhile, the Cub offense continued its season-long struggles, managing only one run on five hits as the Cubs were blown out again by the Pirates, losing 7–1.
- **April 12** – Kris Bryant homered as the Cubs traveled to Milwaukee, but the Cub offense failed to score any other runs until the ninth as the Cubs lost to the Brewers 6–3. Adbert Alzolay pitched well, before surrendering three runs in the sixth and Andrew Chafin gave up three more in the inning. Through 10 games, the Cub offense set franchise records for lows in hitting and batting average over any 10-game period in Cub history. In addition, the Cubs have struck out 100 times which is more than double their hits (49) in that time period.
- **April 13** – After placing four players on the COVID-19 list, including three relief pitchers, the Cubs scratched Kyle Hendricks from his scheduled start against the Brewers because he wasn't feeling well. Alec Mills started instead for the Cubs and pitched four innings while surrendering only two runs. The Cub bullpen held the Brewers scoreless for the rest of the game, but the Cub offense only managed one run until the eighth when Willson Contreras hit a two-run homer to give the Cubs a 3–2 lead. Craig Kimbrel walked one batter in 1.1 innings, but got the save as the Cubs moved to 5–6 on the season.
- **April 14** – In the final game of the three-game series, the Cubs' offensive troubles continued as they were shut out 7–0. Jake Arrieta gave up three runs in five innings as the Cubs managed only four hits in the loss.
- **April 15** – Major League Baseball announced that manager David Ross was suspended one game and RHP Ryan Tepera suspended three games for throwing at Brewers RHP Brandon Woodruff. Tepera appealed the suspension while Ross will serve his suspension on April 16. It was reported that Cub coach Mike Borzello was also suspended for one game.
- **April 16** – Without Ross due to the suspension, the Cubs welcomed the Braves to Wrigley Field. Zach Davies pitched four innings while surrendering four runs as the Cubs' offensive woes continued. Willson Contreras hit his third homer of the season and Eric Sogard drove in a run as the Cubs lost 5–2.
- **April 17** – Braves' starter Huascar Ynoa entered the game with 0.75 ERA, but the Cub offense finally broke out of its funk, at least for a game. Contreras hit two homers as did Kris Bryant. David Bote and Javier Báez also joined the homer parade as the Cubs scored a season-high 13 runs en route to a 13–4 win.
- **April 18** – On Sunday Night Baseball, Kyle Hendricks became the first Cub ever to allow four home runs in the first inning as the Braves blew the Cubs out 13–4. Anthony Rizzo did hit two solo home runs for the Cubs in the loss.
- **April 20** – After an off day, the New York Mets traveled to face the Cubs at Wrigley. Jake Arrieta pitched well again, allowing only one run in five innings. Meanwhile, the Cub offense, continued to struggle, but scored three runs, only one of which was on a hit. The other two runs scored on a bases loaded walk and a throwing error by Mets' third baseman J. D. Davis. Craig Kimbrel walked two and gave up a hit to force the bases loaded in the ninth, but held on for the save in the Cubs 3–1 win.
- **April 21** – The Mets took an early 2–0 lead before the Cubs scored seven runs in the fourth without a home run helped by two Met errors in the inning. The Mets narrowed the lead to 7–4 in the fifth, but the Cubs added three more in the bottom half of the fifth. Javier Báez hit a grand slam in the sixth, pushing the lead to 14–4. The Cubs added two more runs as they blew out the Mets 16–4.
- **April 22** – Willson Contreras drove in a run with an infield single and Kris Bryant doubled in two runs to give Trevor Williams a 3–0 lead in the fourth. However, the Mets chipped away at the lead, tying it at three in the seventh. In the 10th, the Mets left the bases loaded and Jason Heyward drove in the game-winning run with a pinch-hit single to give the Cubs the 4–3 win and a sweep of the series. The win moved the Cubs back to .500 on the season.
- **April 23** – The Cub offense erupted again, scoring in double figures for the third time in six games as the Cubs blew out the Brewers at Wrigley Field. Javier Báez, Willson Contreras, Jake Marisnick, and Anthony Rizzo each homered for the Cubs as Marisnick drove in five on the day in the 15–2 win that extend the Cubs' winning streak to four games.
- **April 24** – The Cubs took an early 2–0 lead on a two-run double by Nico Hoerner and Adbert Alzolay allowed only one run in 5.2 innings, but the Cub bullpen surrendered three runs as the Brewers ended the Cubs' four-game winning streak 4–3.
- **April 25** – Jake Arrieta allowed one run in six innings and the Cub bullpen kept the Brewers scoreless for two more innings before allowing six runs in the ninth. The Cubs were shut out for the first time in eight games as they lost to the Brewers 6–0. Prior to the game, Ryan Tepera's suspension was reduced to two games and he began to serve it.
- **April 26** – The Cubs traveled to Atlanta to face the Braves. After falling behind 4–0, Kris Bryant hit a grand slam to tie it in the third. The Braves quickly retook the lead and led 8–5 in the seventh before Willson Contreras homered to narrow the lead to one. However, the Cubs could manage no further, losing their third straight, 8–7.
- **April 27** – Trevor Williams pitched well, allowing only two runs in five innings, but the Cub offense reverted to its old ways, failing to score as the Cubs lost 5–0.
- **April 28** – Kyle Hendricks gave up four runs in the first inning and seven runs over 3.2 innings. Alec Mills relieved and allowed three more runs as the Cubs were blown out by the Braves 10–0.
- **April 29** – After losing five straight games, the Cubs jumped out early to a 4–0 lead on the Braves on RBIs by Kris Bryant, Javier Báez, and Jason Heyward. Heyward drove in Báez in the fifth and Nico Hoerner drove in a run as well in the fifth to push the Cub lead to 6–1. Jake Marisnick added a homer in the seventh as the Cubs won 9–3.
- **April 30** – The Cubs next traveled to faced the Reds in Cincinnati. After taking a 2–0 lead, Jake Arrieta surrendered seven runs in 3.1 innings. With the Cubs trailing 8–2, they added two runs in the seventh and two in the ninth, but could add no more, losing 8–6. Reds first baseman Joey Votto hit his 300th career home run in the game.

==== May ====
- **May 1** – Zach Davies allowed two runs, only one earned, in four innings of work. Davies also drove in a run on a sacrifice bunt while Jason Heyward and Nico Hoerner each drove in a run to give the Cubs a 3–2 lead. Craig Kimbrel gave up two hits in the ninth, but held on for his fifth save on the year as the Cubs beat the Reds 3–2. The benches cleared in the eighth when Javier Báez took exception to Amir Garrett's celebration after striking out Anthony Rizzo.
- **May 2** – In the finale of the series, each team homered five times as Kris Bryant homered twice. Anthony Rizzo, Ian Happ, and Javier Báez each homered as well as the game went to extra innings tied at 12. Craig Kimbrel gave up his first run of the year in the 10th as the Reds won 13–12. Happ left the game after a collision with Nico Heorner later in the game.
- **May 4** – After the prior night's game was rained out, the Dodgers took on the Cubs at Wrigley Field in a doubleheader. In the first game, the Cubs chased Dodger starter Clayton Kershaw after one inning, his shortest career start ever. David Bote drove in three in the inning with a bases-clearing double as the Cubs took a 4–0 lead. Jake Marisnick homered in the sixth as the Cubs pushed the lead to 7–0. Kyle Hendricks pitched a complete game (seven innings in a doubleheader) as the Cubs won 7–1. In the second game, the Cubs took the lead in the fourth on a solo home run by Jason Heyward. Still leading 1–0 in the top of the seventh, Craig Kimbrel gave up a home run to tie the game. Going into extra innings, the Dodgers scored twice in the eighth to take the lead. Down two strikes with two outs in the bottom of the eighth, Javier Báez hit a two-run, game-tying home run to send the game to the ninth inning. In the ninth, Justin Steele walked one, but did not allow a run. In the bottom half, Anthony Rizzo grounded out to move Bryant to third (who had led off the extra inning at second) and Bote singled to score Bryant and give the Cubs the 4–3 win and the doubleheader sweep.
- **May 5** – Adbert Alzolay allowed two runs in five innings and left with the game tied at two. The game remained tied at three in to the 10th where the Dodgers and Cubs each scored a run in the 10th inning. In the 11th, the Dodgers retook the lead 5–4. But, Matt Duffy singled to score Willson Contreras and Anthony Rizzo singled to score Duffy to give the Cubs the win and three-game sweep of the Dodgers, 6–5.
- **May 7** – After a day off, the Pirates next visited Wrigley Field with the Cubs looking to extend their three-game winning streak. Zach Davies pitched seven scoreless innings and left the game with the Cubs ahead 3–0. The Cub bullpen struggled in the ninth, surrendering two runs, but held on for the 3–2 win.
- **May 8** – Trevor Williams allowed two runs in five innings while the Cub bullpen shut out the Pirates for the remainder of the game. Matt Duffy drove in the winning run in the seventh with a pinch-hit single as the Cubs beat the Pirates again 3–2.
- **May 9** – Looking to sweep their second straight series, Kyle Hendricks surrendered four runs in the first inning. Hendricks allowed six total runs in just five innings. Trailing 6–2 in the ninth, Joc Pederson drove in a run with a single and Ildemaro Vargas doubled to bring the Cubs within a run at 6–5. However, Javier Báez pinch hit and grounded out to the end game as the Pirates won 6–5.
- **May 11** – After another off day, the Cubs traveled to face the Cleveland Indians. Adbert Alzolay pitched well, surrendering only three runs in six innings. However. Cleveland starter Shane Bieber held the Cubs to only two runs. Trailing 3–2 in the ninth, the Matt Duffy grounded into a double play to end the game.
- **May 12** – Zach Davies again pitched well, allowing only one run in 5.1 innings of work. Tied at one apiece, the Indians loaded the bases against Keegan Thompson in the bottom of the ninth and won the game with a single to right, 2–1. The Cubs were swept in the short two-game series.
- **May 14** – After another off day, the Cubs traveled to Detroit to face the Tigers. Kris Bryant hit a two-run homer in the third and scored a run in the fifth as the Cubs took a 4–0 lead over the Tigers. Jake Arrieta, coming of the injured list, pitched six innings and allowed only two runs as the Cubs won 4–2.
- **May 15** – Matt Duffy hit his first home run of the season and drove in five runs as the Cubs and Tigers traded leads through game two of the series. Anthony Rizzo drove in three runs on the day, but the Cub bullpen could not stop the Tigers from scoring two in the bottom of the 10th as the Cubs lost 9–8.
- **May 16** – In the finale of the series, Ian Happ, fresh off the injured list, hit a two-run homer in the sixth as the Cubs pulled away for the 5–1 win over the Tigers. Kyle Hendricks pitched eight plus innings while allowing only one run in the win.
- **May 17** – The Cubs returned home to face the Washington Nationals at Wrigley. Former Cub Jon Lester made the start for the Nationals and the Cubs hit three home runs off him as Jason Heyward, Javier Báez, and Willson Contreras greeted their former teammate rudely. Kyle Schwarber, also making his return to Wrigley, homered for the Nationals, but it was not enough as the Cubs won easily 7–3.
- **May 18** – In game two of the series against the Nationals, the Cubs took an early lead on a Willson Contreras two-run scoring single, by Zach Davies quickly surrendered the lead and left the game tied at three. David Bote hit a two-run homer in the sixth and Ian Happ added a solo homer in the eighth as the Cubs won their third in a row 6–3.
- **May 19** – Jake Arrieta surrendered four runs in five innings and the Cubs trailed 4–2 going into the ninth. A Javier Báez solo home run pulled the Cubs within one, but Matt Duffy struck out with they tying run at second to end the game. The 4–3 loss ended the Cubs three-game winning streak and dropped them back to .500 on the season. Nationals manager Dave Martinez was ejected from the game after arguing a call and picked up first base and threw it before leaving the field.
- **May 20** – Ian Happ hit two home runs and drove three while the Cub bullpen continued its strong season, surrendering no runs in 4.1 innings of relief. Joc Pederson and Nick Martini each drove in a run as the Cubs won 5–2. The win moved the Cubs back to one game above .500 on the season.
- **May 21** – The Cubs next traveled to face the division-leading St. Louis Cardinals at Busch Stadium. Joc Pederson homered on the first pitch of the game and drove in another run with a sacrifice fly as the Cubs took a 4–3 lead into the eighth. In the eighth, the Cubs scored eight runs, highlighted by a bases-clearing double by Anthony Rizzo and a two-run scoring single by David Bote. The 12–3 win brought the Cubs within two games of the division leaders.
- **May 22** – In game two of the series, Yadier Molina hit a go-ahead home run in the seventh to give the Cardinals the 2–1 win. Adbert Alzolay pitched well, giving up only two runs in seven innings, but suffered the loss.
- **May 23** – After going scoreless for nine innings, Javier Báez hit a two-run home run in the 10th and Craig Kimbrel only allowed the runner from second to score as the Cubs won 2–1. Zach Davies pitched five scoreless innings and five Cub relievers combined to give the Cubs the win and move them two games over .500 and two games behind the Cardinals in the division.
- **May 25** – After an off day, the Cubs traveled to Pittsburgh to face the Pirates. The Cubs fell behind early as Jake Arrieta gave up three runs in the first two innings. But, Joc Pederson hit two home runs and drove in three runs while Anthony Rizzo drove in a run as the Cubs beat the Pirates 4–3. The Cubs moved within half a game of first place in the division with the win.
- **May 26** – Trevor Williams allowed only one run in six innings against his former Pirate teammates while the Cub bullpen kept up its scoreless streak as the Cubs won 4–1. Kris Bryant continued his strong season, going 3–5 and driving in two runs while David Bote hit a two-run homer in the win. The win moved the Cubs four games over .500 on the season.
- **May 27** – Javier Báez reached second on a grounder to short when he stopped and ran back toward home plate while being chased by Pirates first baseman Will Craig which allowed Willson Contreras to score from second all with two outs which gave the Cubs a 2–0 lead in the third. Ian Happ then drove in Báez with a single to extend the lead to 3–0. As the Cubs continued to struggle with injuries, Patrick Wisdom hit his first homer as a Cub and the Cub bullpen kept up its scoreless streak as the Cubs won 5–3 and swept the Pirates. The win moved the Cubs five games over .500 on the season.
- **May 28** – The Cubs returned home to face the Reds and David Bote hit a solo home run while Adbert Alzolay and the Cub bullpen shut out the Reds for the 1–0 win. The win moved the Cubs six games over .500 on the season.
- **May 29** – Ian Happ, Eric Sogard, and Joc Pederson each drove in two runs as the Cubs blew out the Reds 10–2. David Bote left the game in the fourth after injuring his shoulder sliding in to the second. The injury added to the team's injury issues as the Cubs were already without Jason Heyward, Nico Hoerner, Matt Duffy, and Jake Marisnick, all on the IL, and Anthony Rizzo who had back issues. The Cub bullpen's streak of 38.1 innings of scoreless relief ended with a run scoring off of Keegan Thompson in the eighth.
- **May 30** – Jake Arrieta gave up five runs in just 3.2 innings of work as the Cubs lost to the Reds 5–1. With David Bote being added to the IL and Anthony Rizzo still not playing, the Cub offense managed only one run on an RBI single from Kris Bryant. The loss ended the Cubs six-game winning streak.
- **May 31** – On Memorial Day, Javier Báez and Patrick Wisdom each hit two runs while Kris Bryant also homered as the Cubs blew out the San Diego Padres 7–2 at Wrigley Field. Kohl Stewart, making the start for Trevor Williams who was placed on the IL with appendicitis, pitched five innings and allowed only one unearned run in the win. The win moved the Cubs seven games over .500 and into sole possession of first place in the division.

==== June ====
- **June 1** – Patrick Wisdom hit his third home run in two games and Willson Contreras also homered to give the Cubs a 4–3 lead over the Padres. Kyle Hendricks pitched seven innings, allowing three runs, and the Cub bullpen shut out the Padres to secure the win.
- **June 2** – Anthony Rizzo drove in two runs and scored a run while Javier Báez hit a two-run homer as the Cubs beat the Padres 6–1. Adbert Alzolay pitched five innings and allowed only one run while the bullpen again shut out the Padres to ensure the sweep of the series. The win moved the Cubs a season-high nine games over .500.
- **June 3** – The Cubs next traveled to San Francisco to take on the Giants at Oracle Park. Joc Pederson hit a two-run homer into McCovey Cove, but Zach Davies surrendered four runs in just 4.1 innings and the Cub bullpen allowed another three runs as the Cubs lost 7–2. Despite the loss, the Cubs remained 1.5 games ahead of the Cardinals in the division.
- **June 4** – Jake Arrieta gave up six runs on six hits in two innings and the Cub bullpen allowed two runs. Joc Pederson and Kris Bryant Homered for the Cubs, but it was not enough as the lost to the Giants 8–5.
- **June 5** – Rooke Patrick Wisdom hit his fifth home run in the second, but Kohl Stewart, making his second start for the Cubs, surrendered three runs on seven hits in 3.2 innings. Trailing 4–2 in the ninth, the Cubs pushed across a run with one out and had two runners on, but Willson Contreras and Jason Heyward struck out to end the game. The loss was the third straight for the Cubs in the series against the Giants.
- **June 6** – In the final game of the four-game series against the Giants, Patrick Wisdom hit two more home runs for the Cubs, tying the game at three in the fourth with his second homer. Kyle Hendricks scored a run in the fifth on an error by Giants catcher Buster Posey and the Cub bullpen held the Giants scoreless for 2.2 innings to avoid the sweep and give the Cubs the 4–3 win.
- **June 7** – The Cubs next traveled to San Diego to face the Padres for the second time in a week. Adbert Alzolay gave up four runs in three innings and left the game with a blister on his pitching hand. The Cubs narrowed the lead, scoring three runs on a throwing error and Sergio Alcántara's sacrifice fly in the fourth. Ian Happ added a solo home run, but the Cub bullpen could not keep it close and the Cubs lost 9–4.
- **June 8** – After losing four of their last five, the Cubs scored seven runs on homers by Anthony Rizzo, Willson Contreras, and Patrick Wisdom. Rizzo also drove in two runs on a double and had four RBI in the game as the Cubs won 7–1. Zach Davies allowed only one hit in six innings against his former team as the Cubs won their fourth game against the Padres in five tries.
- **June 9** – Playing their 16th straight game without an off day, Joc Pederson and Sergio Alcántara each hit solo home runs while Jake Arrieta allowed only one run five innings. The Cub bullpen shut out the Padres with Craig Kimbrel pitched a perfect ninth for the save as the Cubs won 3–1.
- **June 11** – After an off day, the Cubs returned home to face the Cardinals with 100% capacity fan attendance being allowed at Wrigley Field for the first time since 2019. Kohl Stewart surrendered five runs in four innings and the Cubs fell behind 5–1. However, a couple of Cardinal errors allowed two Cubs to score and Sergio Alcántara tripled in a run to narrow the lead to 5–4. An Anthony Rizzo homer on a 14-pitch at-bat tied the game and Joc Pederson gave the Cubs the lead with a two-run scoring double. Willson Contreras added a homer as the Cub bullpen shut out the Cardinals giving the Cubs their third straight win, beating the Cardinals 8–5. The win kept the Cubs in a first-place tie with the Brewers.
- **June 12** – The Cubs scored five runs in the second a two-run homer by Ian Happ, a run-scoring single by Javier Báez, and a walk and hit batter with the bases loaded in the second. Kyle Hendricks allowed only one run in six innings and the Cub bullpen shut out the Cardinals again as the Cubs won their fourth straight 7–2. Joc Pederson also homered in his third straight game.
- **June 13** – In the finale of the three-game series against the Cardinals, the Cubs scored two runs in the third on a fielding error by the Cardinals and a run-scoring single by Anthony Rizzo. Zach Davies surrendered only two hits in 6.2 innings and the Cub bullpen again shut out the Cardinals as the Cubs won 2–0 and swept the Cardinals on Sunday Night Baseball.
- **June 14** – Jake Arrieta gave up four runs in five innings of work while the Cub offense only managed two run in the first game of a four-game series against the Mets in New York. Anthony Rizzo and Patrick Wisdom homered for the Cubs as they lost 5–2.
- **June 15** – The Cubs took an early 2–0 lead over the Mets with a Javier Báez two-run homer in the third, but Alec Mills, making a spot start for the Cubs, gave up three runs in 4.1 innings. That was enough for the Mets as they held the Cubs to two runs in the 3–2 loss.
- **June 16** – Robert Stock made a spot start for the Cubs and walked six batters while giving up five runs in four innings. Anthony Rizzo and Rafael Ortega homered in the ninth, but it was not enough against the Mets as the Cubs lost their third straight 6–3.
- **June 17** – Looking to avoid the sweep in the final game of the four-game series against the Mets, Kyle Hendricks continued his strong string of starts, allowing only two hits and no runs in six innings of work. The Cub bullpen pitched three perfect innings of relief and the Cubs won 2–0 on the strength of a Javier Báez two-run homer. The win moved the Cubs one game ahead of the Brewers in the division race.
- **June 18** – Returning home to face the Miami Marlins, The Cubs took an early 1–0 lead on a Joc Pederson home run in the first. However, Zach Davies struggled mightily, allowing eight runs on seven hits in six innings. Joc Pederson homered again in the game, but the Cubs lost 10–2.
- **June 19** – The Cubs were blown out for a second straight game against the Marlins and lost their fifth game in the last six games as Jake Arrieta and the Cub bullpen were shelled for 11 runs. The Cubs managed only one run, a Jason Heyward homer in the fifth as the Cubs lost 11–1. Despite the loss, the Cubs remained tied for the division lead with the Brewers.
- **June 20** – Looking to avoid the sweep in the second straight series, Alec Mills pitched well, scattering six hits in five innings while the Cub bullpen shut out the Marlins. The Cubs only managed two runs, one on a passed ball that scored Jason Heyward and another on a Joc Pederson infield single, but it was enough as the Cubs won 2–0.
- **June 21** – The Cubs next welcomed Cleveland to Wrigley for a short two-game series. Adbert Alzolay, who had been on the injured list with a blister, returned and surrendered three runs in 4.2 innings. Meanwhile, the Cub offense was shut out as the Cubs lost 4–0.
- **June 22** – In game two of the short series against Cleveland, Kyle Hendricks held the Indians to no runs in six innings while the Cub bullpen surrendered only one run. Kris Bryant, Willson Contreras, and Patrick Wisdom all homered for the Cubs as they blew out the Indians 7–1. The win kept the Cubs in a first-place tie with the Brewers.
- **June 24** – After an off day, the Cubs traveled to Los Angeles to face the Dodgers for a four-game series. In game one, Zach Davies walked five, but didn't give up a hit in six innings. Three Cub relievers, Ryan Tepera, Andrew Chafin, and Craig Kimbrel each walked a batter, but none surrendered a hit as the Cubs threw their first combined no-hitter in club history. Javier Báez and Willson Contreras homered for the Cubs as they won 4–0.
- **June 25** – Jake Arrieta walked three and gave up five hits, but managed to allow only two runs in five innings, but the Cub bullpen could not hold the Dodgers at two runs. The Cubs tied it at two in the seventh on a Joc Pederson sacrifice fly, but the Dodgers scored four in the eighth to seal the win 6–2. The loss dropped the Cubs a game behind the Brewers in the division.
- **June 26** – Alec Mills gave up eight hits, but allowed only two runs in four innings of work against the Dodgers. Anthony Rizzo homered in the fourth and Ian Happ doubled in a run to tie the game at two in the fifth, but Cody Bellinger hit a walk-off home run in the bottom of the ninth as the Cubs dropped their eighth game in their last 12 and fell two games behind the Brewers in the division race.
- **June 27** – The Cubs concluded their four-games series against the Dodgers on Sunday Night Baseball. Clayton Kershaw struck out 13 Cubs and allowed only a Javier Báez solo home run as the Dodgers blew out the Cubs 7–1. Adbert Alzolay allowed six runs, four earned, in three innings in the loss as the Cubs dropped three games behind the Brewers in the division.
- **June 28** – The Cubs next traveled to face the division-leading Brewers in Milwaukee. Both teams scored two run in the first inning, but Kyle Hendricks allowed two more runs and left the game trailing 4–2. Patrick Wisdom hit a pinch-hit, two-run home run in the top of the eighth to tie the game, but the Cubs imploded in the bottom half of the inning, allowing 10 runs and losing 14–4. The loss moved the Cubs three games behind the Brewers in the division. Anthony Rizzo missed the game due to back issues.
- **June 29** – In game two of the series against the Brewers, the Cubs fell behind early on a Christian Yelich RBI double in the first. Patrick Wisdom tied the game in the fourth on a run-scoring double, but the Zach Davies gave up the lead in the bottom half of the inning. The Cubs had two runners on in each of the last three innings, but could not push across a run as they lost 2–1, their fifth straight loss, and fell five games behind the Brewers in the division. Kris Bryant (oblique) and Anthony Rizzo (back) did not play for the Cubs.
- **June 30** – In the final game of the three-game series against the Brewers, the Cubs took an early 7–0 lead. However, Jake Arrieta surrendered six runs in 1.2 innings. However, the Cubs still held the lead until the fourth when the Cub bullpen surrendered eight runs. As a result, the Cubs were blown out 15–7 and lost their sixth straight game.

==== July ====
- **July 2** – After an off day, the Cubs traveled to Cincinnati to face the Reds. The Cubs offensive struggles returned as they managed only one run, while the Reds managed two runs off of Alec Mills. The Cubs lost their seventh straight game 2–1.
- **July 3** – The Cubs lost a second straight game by one run as the Reds outscored the Cubs 3–2. The eighth straight loss dropped the Cubs to only one game over .500 on the season.
- **July 4** – On Independence Day, the Cubs again lost by one run, their ninth straight loss as they fell 3–2 to the Reds. Kyle Hendricks allowed only one run in six innings, but the bullpen gave up the lead in the seventh as the Cubs fell to .500 on the season. Major League Baseball announced the full All Star lineups which included two Cubs, Kris Bryant and Craig Kimbrel.
- **July 5** – The Cubs returned home to face the Philadelphia Phillies. The Cubs took a one-run lead in the second and third innings, but starter Zach Davies surrendered a tying run in the following inning each time. The Cub bullpen surrendered the lead in the sixth and the game got out of hand in the eighth when the Phillies scored six runs and then three more in the ninth as the Cubs were blown out 13–3. The loss marked the 10th straight loss for the Cubs who dropped under .500 on the season.
- **July 6** – Looking to avoid their 11th straight loss, Jake Arrieta gave up a grand slam in the first and three runs in the third to put the Cubs behind 7–0. The Cubs did manage to score 10 runs in the game, but the Cub bullpen surrendered eight runs as the Cubs lost 15–10 to the Phillies.
- **July 7** – The Cubs jumped to an early lead against the Phillies on RBI singles by Jason Heyward, Nico Hoerner, Rafael Ortega, and Willson Contreras. An RBI triple by Anthony Rizzo pushed the lead to 5–0 in the second. Alec Mills did surrender three runs in 5.2 innings, but the Cub bullpen blanked the Phillies as the Cubs won 8–3 ending their 11-game losing streak. Kris Bryant left the game with an apparent hamstring injury and Javier Báez was scratched before the game due to an injury. The win was the first for the Cubs since no-hitting the Dodgers on June 24. In that time span, the Cubs went from 10 games over .500 and tied for the division lead to one game under .500 and 8.5 games out of first place.
- **July 8** – In the finale of the three-game series against the Phillies, the Cubs were blown out again 8–0. The Cubs managed only five hits as they lost their 12th game in their last 13.
- **July 9** – The Cubs next welcomed the Cardinals to Wrigley and Kyle Hendricks won his ninth straight decision, allowing only two runs in 6.1 innings. The Cub offense was led by Kris Bryant's pinch-hit three-run double and Patrick Wisdom's 12th homer of the season as the Cubs won 10–5.
- **July 10** – The Cubs were shut out for the second time in three games as the Cardinals won easily, 6–0. The game marked the last before the All Star break as the following game was postponed due to rain.
- **July 16** – After the All-Star break, Kyle Hendricks won his 10th straight decision as the Cubs beat the Diamondbacks in Arizona 5–1. Jason Heyward, Anthony Rizzo, and Patrick Wisdom homered in the win.
- **July 17** – Trailing 2–1 entering the ninth against the Diamondbacks, new Cub Robinson Chirinos singled to tie the game and Willson Contreras hit a two-run homer to give the Cubs the 4–2 win. The win marked the first time the Cubs had won after trailing while entering the ninth inning.
- **July 18** – The Cub bullpen surrendered four runs in less than four innings as the Cubs lost their first game after the All-Star break. The Diamondbacks 6–4 win dropped the Cubs back to one game under .500 on the season.
- **July 19** – The Cubs returned to St. Louis to face the Cardinals and lost their second straight game, losing 8–3. Alec Mills allowed five runs, only one earned as the Cubs committed three errors in the fourth inning in the loss.
- **July 20** – The Cubs trailed the Cardinals 6–1 entering the ninth, but two bases loaded walks, a two-run scoring single by Javier Baez, and a two-run double by Ian Happ gave the Cubs a 7–6 come-from-behind win.
- **July 21** – Poor baserunning by Anthony Rizzo in the 10th prevented the Cubs from scoring and Yadier Molina drove in the winning run as the Cubs lost to the Cardinals 3–2 in extra innings.
- **July 22** – Adbert Alzolay gave up three runs on two homers and the Cubs managed only two runs again losing to the Cardinals 3–2.
- **July 23** – Robinson Chironas homered twice, Javier Baez hit a two-run homer, and Nico Hoerner drove in two as the Cubs beat the Diamondbacks 8–3 at Wrigley.
- **July 24** – The Cub bullpen surrendered five runs as the D-Backs came from behind to beat the Cubs 7–3.
- **July 25** – In the final game of the season against the Diamondbacks, Kris Bryant and Anthony Rizzo hit back-to-back homers in the first and David Bote hit a two-run homer in his return to the lineup as the Cubs won 5–1.
- **July 26** – The Cubs returned home to face the Reds and Anthony Rizzo hit a two-run homer in the first to give the Cubs the early lead. Kyle Hendricks struggled however, surrendering five runs in 4.1 innings and left the game trailing 5–3. However the Cubs scored one run in the seventh and Willson Contreras tied it in the eighth with a homer. In the ninth, Javier Baez hit a pinch-hit game-winning single off Reds closer Amir Garrett for the walk-off 6–5 win.
- **July 27** – In game two of the series against the Reds, Joey Votto hit two home runs for the Reds, his fourth consecutive game with a homer, and the Cubs lost 7–4. Anthony Rizzo homered in this third consecutive game.
- **July 28** – Joey Votto hit two more homers for the Reds as the Reds blew out the Cubs 8–2.
- **July 29** – Joey Votto homered again for the Reds while Willson Contreras, Patrick Wisdom, and Ian Happ homered for the Cubs. But it was not enough as the Cubs lost 7–4.
- **July 30** – Following the trade deadline which saw the Cubs part with Kris Bryant, Anthony Rizzo, Javier Baez, Craig Kimbrel, Ryan Tepera, Trevor Williams, and Jake Marisnick, the Cubs traveled to Washington, D.C., to play the Nationals. Jake Arrieta, coming of the IL, pitched four innings and allowed two runs on seven hits. The Cubs trailed 4–1 in the eighth when Patrick Wisdom drove in two runs to bring the Cubs within one. However, the Cubs could not score another run and lost 4–3.
- **July 31** – Kyle Hendricks won his league-leading 13th game of the season as the Cubs beat the Nationals 6–3. Rafael Ortega homered in drove in two runs in the win against the Nationals.

==== August ====
- **August 1** – Rafael Ortega hit three home runs and drove in all five of the Cubs' runs, but it was not enough as the Cubs lost to the Nationals 6–5. Manuel Rodríguez, making his second appearance for the Cubs, gave up the winning run in the ninth inning.
- **August 3** – After an off day, the Cubs traveled to Colorado to face the Rockies. Zach Davies gave up seven runs in four innings and new Cub reliever Michael Rucker surrendered four runs in 1.2 innings of work as the Cubs were blown out.
- **August 4** – Patrick Wisdom hit a bases-clearing double in the fifth to give the Cubs a 3–2 win over the Rockies. Alec Mills allowed two runs in six innings and the Cub bullpen pitched three scoreless innings as Manuel Rodríguez earned his first career save.
- **August 5** – Jake Arrieta gave up four runs in four innings and newly acquired Jake Jewell allowed two runs in one inning of relief as the Cubs lost to the Rockies 6–5. Willson Contreras drove in two runs in the loss.
- **August 6** – The Cubs returned home to face their crosstown rivals, the Chicago White Sox. Kyle Hendriks allowed two runs in six innings, but the Cubs trailed 4–1 in the bottom of the eighth. Facing their former teammate, Craig Kimbrel, Andrew Romine hit a three-run home run to tie the game. In the 10th, the Sox scored four runs on a two-run homer and two-run scoring single. The Cubs got a home run from Frank Schwindel, but lost 8–6.
- **August 7** – In game two of the series against the White Sox, the Cubs were shut out 4–0.
- **August 8** – In the finale of the three-game series, the White Sox hit three home runs in the first of Zach Davies and blew out the Cubs 9–3.
- **August 10** – After a rainout the day before, the Cubs took on the Brewers at Wrigley in a doubleheader. In game one of the doubleheader, Justin Steele made his first career start and pitched three scoreless innings before giving up three runs in the fourth. The Cubs only managed two runs as they lost 4–2. In game two of the doubleheader, a rain delay in third meant the Cub bullpen would finish the game. Dan Winkler allowed three runs and Kyle Ryan gave up two as the Cubs lost 6–3. Patrick Wisdom homered and drove in two runs in the game.
- **August 11** – Jake Arrieta gave up eight runs in four innings as the Cubs were blown out by the Brewers 10–0. The loss marked the Cubs' seventh straight loss.
- **August 12** – In the finale of the four-game set against the Brewers, Kyle Hendricks gave up nine runs in four innings as the Cubs were blown out again, 17–4. In the game, Cub shortstop Andrew Romine pitched an inning while his brother, Cub catcher Austin Romine, did the catching, marking the 16th time siblings had made up a battery in a game.
- **August 13** – The Cubs traveled to Miami to face the Marlins. Adbert Alzolay gave up six runs in 1.1 innings while Dan Winkler allowed six runs without getting an out. As a result, the Marlins scored 11 runs in the second inning to take a 14–4 lead. The Cubs rallied with four in the eighth and one in the ninth, but still lost by four, 14–10. The loss was the Cubs' ninth straight.
- **August 14** – In game two of the series against the Marlins, the Cubs took a 4–3 lead in the top of the eighth, but the Cub bullpen quickly surrendered the lead as the Cubs lost their 10th straight game, 5–4.
- **August 15** – The Cubs tied their season-high losing streak as the Marlins beat the Cubs 4–1, the Cubs' 11th straight loss.
- **August 16** – The Cubs next traveled to Cincinnati. Justin Steele pitched well, allowing only two runs in four innings. However, the Cub bullpen imploded, allowing 11 runs as the Cubs lost their 12th straight game, 15–4.
- **August 17** – The Cubs ended their 12-game losing streak as Kyle Hendricks won his league-leading 14th game of the season. The 2–1 win over the Reds moved the Cubs to 16 games under .500 on the season.
- **August 18** – The Cubs won their second straight game against the Reds as Sergio Alcantara, Ian Happ, and rookie Michael Hermosillo hit homers in the 7–1 win.
- **August 20** – After an off day, the Cubs returned home to face the Kansas City Royals. Zach Davies gave up four runs as the Cubs lost 6–2.
- **August 21** – The Cubs lost their second in a row to the Royals. Patrick Wisdom broke up a no-hitter in the seventh with a two-run homer, but it was not enough as the Cubs lost 4–2.
- **August 22** – Alec Mills gave up seven runs in four innings as the Cubs were blown out 9–1 in the final game of the series against the Royals.
- **August 23** – The Cubs next faced the Rockies at Wrigley Field. Rafael Ortega hit a walk-off three-run home run in the bottom of the ninth to give the Cubs the 6–4 win. The win snapped the Cubs' franchise record 13-game home losing streak.
- **August 25** – After a rainout, the Cubs played the Rockies in a doubleheader. In game one, Patrick Wisdom hit a three-run home run to give the Cubs a 5–2 win. In the second game of the doubleheader, the Cubs trailed the Rockies by three in the bottom of the seventh, but Ian Happ hit a three-run home run to force extra innings. After both teams scored a run in the eighth and nothing in the ninth, the Rockies scored four in the 10th to win the game 13–10.
- **August 27** – After an off day, the Cubs travelled across town to face the White Sox. The Cubs scored six runs in the first inning, but Sox catcher Yasmani Grandal drove in eight runs for the Sox as they beat the Cubs 17–13. Patrick Wisdom homered twice for the Cubs in the loss.
- **August 28** – In game two of the series against the White Sox, Patrick Wisdom homered twice again as the Cubs shut out the Sox 7–0.
- **August 29** – In the finale of the series against the White Sox, the Sox hit five home runs and blew out the Cubs 13–1.
- **August 31** – After an off-day, the Cubs traveled to face the Minnesota Twins. Ian Happ and Frank Schwindel homered for the Cubs as the beat the Twins 3–1.

==== September ====
- **September 1** – In game two of the series against Minnesota, Frank Schwindel homered again, driving in all three runs, as the Cubs won 3–0.
- **September 2** – The Cubs returned home to face the Pirates and led 5–3 going into the ninth behind homers by Ian Happ and Rafael Ortega. However, Rowan Wick allowed two runs in the ninth allowing the Pirates to tie and force extra innings. Pirates shortstop Wilmer Difo dropped an easy fly ball in the 11th to allow the winning run to score as the Cubs won their third straight game.
- **September 3** – Michael Hermosillo homered and drove in three runs while Frank Schwindel homered as the Cubs beat the Pirates 6–5. The win was the fourth straight for the Cubs.
- **September 4** – In game three of the series against the Pirates, the Cubs trailed by two entering the ninth, Frank Schwindel drove in the winning run on an infield single as the Cubs won their fifth straight game 7–6.
- **September 5** – In the finale of the series against the Pirates, the Pirates hit a grand slam while the Cubs hit two grand slams (Matt Duffy and Frank Schwindel) and Duffy added a solo home run for his first multi-home run game on the season. The 11–8 win marked the Cubs sixth straight win.
- **September 6** – The Reds next visited Wrigley Field and Ian Happ hit a three-run homer in the first to give the Cubs an early 3–0 lead. The Reds tied it in the sixth before Frank Schwindel drove in the winning run in the bottom of the eighth as the Cubs won 4–3, their seventh straight win.
- **September 7** – Adrian Sampson made his second start for the Cubs and pitched well, allowing only two runs in five innings. However, it was not enough as the Cub bullpen allowed two more runs and the Cub winning streak ended as the Reds won 4–3.
- **September 8** – In the final game of the season against the Reds, the game went to extra innings tied at one. Jason Heyward hit a three-run walk-off homer in the bottom of the 10th to give the Cubs the 4–1 win.
- **September 10** – After an off day, the Giants visited Wrigley Field for the first time since Kris Bryant had been traded to San Francisco. The Cubs played a video tribute for Bryant prior to the game and presented him with the number 17 from the Wrigley scoreboard. The Cubs took a 1–0 lead in the fourth on a Frank Schwindel homer, but the Giants scored six runs to blow out the Cubs 6–1.
- **September 11** – The Cubs were blown out by the Giants in game two of the series 15–4.
- **September 12** – In the finale of the three-game series, The Giants jumped out to a 5–2 lead, but the Cubs narrowed the lead on an Ian Happ homer and RBIs by David Bote, Robinson Chironas, Nick Martini, and Frank Schwindel. However, it was not enough as the Cubs lost 6–5, getting swept by the Giants.
- **September 14** – After another off day, the Cubs traveled to face the Phillies in Philadelphia. Patrick Wisdom tied Kris Bryant for the Cubs' rookie record for home runs in a season (26) by hitting a solo home run in the fifth. Highly regarded prospect Alfonso Rivas followed Wisdom's homer with his first career home run as the Cubs won 6–3.
- **September 15** – In game two against the Phillies, the Cubs trailed on multiple occasions, but rallied to tie the game twice including in the top of the ninth. However, a passed ball by Robinson Chironos allowed the winning run to score in the bottom of the ninth as the Cubs lost 6–5.
- **September 16** – The Cubs scored seven runs in the top of the third to take a 7–0 lead. However, the Phillies scored seven in the fourth off Kyle Hendricks to tie the game. The Phillies added 10 more runs off the Cub bullpen to blow out the Cubs 17–8.
- **September 17** – The Cubs traveled to Milwaukee to face the Brewers the next day and took a 4–0 lead in the top of the fourth. However, the Brewers rallied to pull within one. In the eighth, the Brewers added four runs to beat the Cubs 8–5. The loss was the Cubs third straight.
- **September 18** – The Brewers again rallied to beat the Cubs in the bottom of the eighth to win 6–4. The win clinched a playoff berth for the Brewers.
- **September 19** – In the finale of the season series against the Brewers, the Cubs scored five runs in the eighth inning as the Cubs beat the Brewers 6–4. Patrick Wisdom hit his 27th home run on the season breaking the Cubs rookie record held by Kris Bryant.
- **September 21** – The Cubs returned home to face the Twins in a short two-game series. After tying the game in the third, the Twins scored five runs in the next two innings and added two more late to beat the Cubs 9–5. Willson Contreras hit his 21st homer of the season in the loss.
- **September 22** – Trailing 5–2 in the ninth, the Cubs scored two runs, but left the tying run on third as they lost to the Twins 5–4.
- **September 24** – After an off day, the Cubs will welcome the second place Wild Card team, St. Louis, to Wrigley for a doubleheader. In game one, Justin Steele allowed six runs in five innings as the Cubs lost 8–5. In game two of the doubleheader, the Cubs were blown out 12–4 marking the Cardinals' 14th straight win.
- **September 25** – In game three of the series, the Cubs took an early 4–2 lead, but the Cub bullpen surrendered seven runs as the Cubs lost again 8–5.
- **September 26** – In the final game of the series against the Cardinals and final game at Wrigley on the season, the Cubs led 2–1 going into the eighth, but the Cub bullpen again surrendered the lead, giving up three runs in the last two innings as the Cubs lost 4–2. The loss was the Cubs' sixth straight.
- **September 28** – After an off day, the Cubs traveled to face the Pirates. Leading 6–3 in the sixth, the Cubs blew the lead again, surrendering five runs as they lost 8–6.
- **September 29** – Trailing 2–1 in the seventh, Willson Contreras doubled to score two runs as the Cubs beat the Pirates 3–2, ending their seven-game losing streak.
- **September 30** – In the final game of the season against the Pirates, Justin Steel pitched seven scoreless innings as the Cubs won easily 9–0.

==== October ====
- **October 1** – The Cubs traveled to St. Louis for the final series of the season. Tied at three in the ninth, Rowan Wick gave up the winning run as the Cubs lost 4–3.
- **October 2** – In game two against the Cardinals, the Cubs led 4–2 in the seventh before the Michael Rucker surrendered three runs to give the Carindals the 5–4 lead. Still trailing in the ninth, Ian Happ hit a two-out, two-run homer to give the Cubs the 6–5 win.
- **October 3** – In a game shortened by two rain delays, the Cubs beat the Cardinals 3–2 to end the season.

=== Transactions ===
==== April ====
April 1	Placed C Austin Romine, RHP Rowan Wick, and RHP Jonathan Holder on the 10-day IL. OF Jake Marisnick changed number to 16.
April 5	Traded RHP James Norwood to San Diego Padres for RHP Dauris Valdez.
April 12	Placed RHP Jason Adam, RHP Dan Winkler, and RHP Brandon Workman on the COVID-19 IL. Recalled RHP Justin Steele and LHP Brad Wieck from Alternate Training Site. Selected the contract of RHP Pedro Strop from Alternate Training Site.
April 13	Placed IF Matt Duffy on the COVID-19 IL. Selected the contract of IF Ildemaro Vargas from Alternate Training Site.
April 14	Activated RHP Jason Adam and C Austin Romine from the COVID-19 IL. Optioned RHP Adbert Alzolay and LHP Brad Wieck to Alternate Training Site. Selected the contract of RHP Shelby Miller from Alternate Training Site. Designated C Tony Wolters for assignment.
April 16	Activated IF Matt Duffy from IL. Returned IF Ildemaro Vargas to Alternate Training Site.
April 17	Outrighted C Tony Wolters to Alternate Training Site. Returned LHP Justin Steele and RHP Pedro Strop to Alternate Training Site. Activated RHP Brandon Workman and RHP Dan Winkler from the 10-day IL.
April 22	Placed OF Joc Pederson on the 10-day IL (left wrist tendinitis). Recalled IF Nico Hoerner from Alternate Training Site.
April 23	Placed RHP Shelby Miller on 10-day IL (low back strain). Recalled LHP Kyle Ryan from Alternate Training Site.
April 24	Optioned LHP Kyle Ryan to Alternate Training Site. Recalled RHP Adbert Alzolay from Alternate Training Site.
April 25	RHP Ryan Tepera suspended.
April 26	Optioned RHP Jason Adam to Alternate Training Site. Placed RHP Rowan Wick and RHP Jonathan Holder on 60-day IL. Placed C Austin Romine on 10-day IL. Selected the contract of RHP Trevor Megill from Alternate Training Site.
April 27	Activated RHP Ryan Tepera.
April 29	Recalled LHP Justin Steel from Alternate Training Site. Designated RHP Brandon Workman for assignment.
April 30	Placed RHP Trevor Megill on 10-day IL (forearm strain). Released RHP Brandon Workman. Recalled LHP Kyle Ryan from Iowa.

==== May ====
May 1	Optioned LHP Kyle Ryan to Iowa. Recalled RHP Keegan Thompson from Iowa.
May 3	Optioned RHP Keegan Thompson to Alternate Training Site. Activated OF Joc Pederson from 10-day IL. Placed IF Nico Hoerner and RHP Dan Winkler on 10-day IL. Recalled LHP Kyle Ryan from Iowa. Signed free agent LHP Ryan Kellogg to a minor league contract.
May 4	Placed RHP Jake Arrieta on 10-day IL. Selected the contract of IF Ildemaro Vargas from Iowa. Recalled RHP Keegan Thompson from Alternate Training Site. Recalled RHP Kohl Stewart from Iowa. Signed free agent LHP Alex Katz and RHP Austin Krzeminski to a minor league contract.
May 5	Optioned RHP Tyson Miller and RHP Kohl Stewart to Iowa. Placed C Austin Romin on the 60-day IL.
May 7	Selected the contract of OF Nick Martini from Iowa. Recalled RHP Jason Adam from Iowa. Designated LHP Kyle Ryan for assignment. Placed OF Ian Happ on 10-day IL.
May 10	Signed free agent RHP Adrian Sampson to a minor league contract.
May 11	Recalled LHP Brad Wieck from Iowa. Place OF Jake Marisnick on 10-day IL. Sent LHP Kyle Ryan outright to Iowa. Acquired OF Trayce Thompson from Arizona Diamondbacks.
May 14	Activated RHP Jake Arrieta and IF Nico Hoerner from the 10-day IL. Optioned RHP Jason Adam and OF Nick Martini to Iowa.
May 15	Activated OF Ian Happ from the 10-day IL. Designated IF Ildemaro Vargas for assignment.
May 16	Placed RHP Alec Mills on 10-day IL. Selected the contract of RHP Tommy Nance from Iowa.
May 18	Traded OF Cameron Maybin to New York Mets for cash.
May 19	Designated C Tony Wolters for assignment. Selected the contract of C P. J. Higgins from Iowa.
May 20	Placed OF Jason Heyward on 10-day IL. Recalled OF Nick Martini from Iowa.
May 21	Placed LHP Justin Steele on 10-day IL. Recalled LHP Brad Wieck from Iowa.
May 22	Sent C Tony Wolters outright to Iowa.
May 25	Placed IF Matt Duffy on 10-day IL. Selected the contract of IF Patrick Wisdom from Iowa. Designated RHP Jason Adam for assignment.
May 26	Released RHP Jason Adam. Activated RHP Shelby Miller and designated for assignment. Selected the contract of OF Rafael Ortega from Iowa. Placed IF Nico Hoerner on 10-day IL.
May 28	Signed free agent IF Tyler Ladendorf to a minor league contract.
May 29	Signed free agent IF Dee Strange-Gordon to a minor league contract.
May 30	Designated RHP Tyson Miller for assignment. Placed IF David Bote on the 10-day IL. Selected the contract of SS Sergio Alcantara from Iowa.
May 31	Placed RHP Trevor Williams on 10-day IL. Recalled RHP Kohl Stewart from Iowa. Released RHP Shelby Miller.

==== June ====
June 2	Activated RHP Trevor Megill from IL and optioned him to Iowa.
June 5	Claimed RHP Dakota Chalmers off waivers from Minnesota Twins and optioned him to Tennessee Smokies. Activated OF Jason Heyward. Recalled RHP Cory Abbott from Iowa. Designated OF Nick Martini for assignment. Optioned LHP Brad Wieck to Iowa.
June 7	Sent OF Nick Martini outright to Iowa. Signed free agent IF Carlos Sepulveda to a minor league contract. Activated OF Jake Marisnick. Optioned RHP Kohl Stewart to Iowa.
June 8	Optioned RHP Cory Abbott to Iowa. Recalled RHP Kohl Stewart from Iowa. Activated RHP Alec Mills from IL. Placed RHP Adbert Alzolay on 10-day IL.
June 11	Selected the contract of C José Lobatón from Iowa. Placed C P. J. Higgins on the 10-day injured list. Designated RHP Dakota Chalmers for assignment.
June 12	Recalled RHP Trevor Megill from Iowa. Optioned RHP Kohl Stewart to Iowa.
June 13	Sent RHP Dakota Chalmers outright to Tennessee. Signed free agent RHP Jose Almonte to a minor league contract.
June 14	Signed free agent C Tim Susnara to a minor league contract.
June 16	Optioned RHP Trevor Megill to Iowa. Placed RHP Dillon Maples on the 10-day IL. Recalled RHP Cory Abbot from Iowa. Selected the contract of RHP Robert Stock. Selected the contract of Mike Hauschild from Lexington Legends. Placed C P. J. Higgins on 60-day IL.
June 17	Optioned RHP Robert Stock to Iowa. Recalled LHP Brad Wieck from Iowa.
June 18	Signed free agent C Harrison Wenson to a minor league contract.
June 19	Selected the contract of SS Edwin Figuera from York Revolution.
June 20	Designated RHP Robert Stock for assignment. Recalled LHP Kyle Ryan from Iowa. Optioned RHP Cory Abbot to Iowa.
June 21	Optioned LHP Kyle Ryan to Iowa. Activated RHP Adbert Alzolay from 10-day IL.
June 22	Signed free agent 1B Matt Warkentin to a minor league contract.
June 27	Signed free agent LHP Dalton Stambaugh to a minor league contract.
June 28	Optioned RHP Tommy Nance to Iowa. Recalled RHP Trevor Megill from Iowa.
June 29	Placed RHP Ryan Tepera on 10-day IL. Optioned RHP Trevor Megill to Iowa. Selected the contract of LHP Adam Morgan from Iowa. Placed IF Matt Duffy on 60-day IL. Recalled RHP Tommy Nance from Iowa.
June 30	Placed C José Lobatón on 60-day IL. Selected the contract of C Taylor Gushue from Iowa.

==== July ====
July 1	Optioned RHP Tommy Nance to Iowa.
July 2	Recalled RHP Kohl Stewart from Iowa.
July 3	Selected the contract of LHP Tony Cingrani from Lexington Legends.
July 4	Activated IF Nico Hoerner from IL. Optioned IF Sergio Alcantara to Iowa.
July 5	Signed free agent C Robinson Chirinos. Designated C Taylor Gushue for assignment.
July 6	Placed IF Eric Sogard and RHP Kohl Stewart on 10-day IL. Recalled IF Sergio Alcantara from Iowa. Activated RHP Trevor Williams from IL.
July 7	Placed RHP Jake Arrieta on 10-day IL. Recalled RHP Cory Abbott from Iowa.
July 8	Optioned LHP Justin Steele to Iowa. Sent C Taylor Gushue outright to Iowa.
July 9	Activated RHP Ryan Tepera from IL. Placed LHP Brad Wieck on 10-day IL. Optioned RHP Cory Abbott to Iowa. Recalled LHP Kyle Ryan from Iowa.
July 12	Signed free agent RHP Jason Adam to a minor league contract.
July 15	Traded CF Joc Pederson to Atlanta Braves for 1B Bryce Ball. Signed OF Christian Franklin and LHP Riley Martin.
July 16	Activated 2B Eric Sogard from the 10-day injured list. Signed LHP Jordan Wicks, SS Liam Spence, LHP Chase Watkins, OF Peter Matt, C Casey Opitz, OF Parker Chavers, and LHP Drew Gray.
July 18	Claimed 1B Frank Schwindel off waivers from Oakland Athletics.
July 19	Activated RHP Dillon Maples from IL. Optioned LHP Kyle Ryan to Iowa.
July 22	Recalled RHP Trevor Megill from Iowa. Optioned IF Sergio Alcantara to Iowa.
July 23	Activated IF Matt Duffy from IL. Designated IF Eric Sogard for assignment. Claimed OF Johneshwy Fargas off waivers from New York Mets and optioned to Iowa. Placed LHP Brad Wieck on 60-day IL.
July 24	Signed draft picks RHP Frankie Scalzo Jr., 3B James Triantos, RHP Erian Rodriguez, 3B BJ Murray Jr., RHP Zachary Leigh, and SS Christian Olivo.
July 25	Activated IF David Bote from IL. Optioned RHP Trevor Megill to Iowa.
July 26	Traded LHP Andrew Chafin to Oakland Athletics for 1B Greg Deichmann and RHP Daniel Palencia.
July 27	Recalled RHP Cory Abbott and LHP Kyle Ryan from Iowa. Optioned RHP Keegan Thompson to Iowa.
July 28	Released IF Eric Sogard.
July 29	Traded Anthony Rizzo and cash to the New York Yankees for RHP Alexander Vizcaino and OF Kevin Alcantara. Traded RHP Ryan Tepera to Chicago White Sox for LHP Bailey Horn. Placed IF Nico Hoerner and RHP Dillon Maples on the 10-day IL. Recalled RHP Trevor Megill and IF Sergio Alcantara from Iowa. Selected the contract of RHP Jake Jewell from Iowa. Optioned RHP Cory Abbott to Iowa. Optioned RHP Alexander Vizcaino to South Bend Cubs. Placed RHP Kohl Stewart on 60-day IL.
July 30	Traded IF Javier Báez, RHP Trevor Williams, and cash to New York Mets for OF Pete Crow-Armstrong. Traded RHP Craig Kimbrel to Chicago White Sox for IF Nick Madrigal and RHP Codi Heuer. Traded IF Kris Bryant to San Francisco Giants for OF Alexander Canario and RHP Caleb Kilian. Traded OF Jake Marisnick to San Diego Padres for RHP Anderson Espinoza. Recalled OF Johneshwy Fargas, IF Frank Schwindel and RHP Manuel Rodríguez from Iowa. Activated RHP Jake Arrieta from 10-day IL. Selected the contract of IF Andrew Romine and RHP Michael Rucker.
July 31	Activated RHP Codi Heuer.

==== August ====
August 6	Placed OF Jason Heyward on 10-day IL. Recalled IF Greg Deichmann from Iowa.
August 10	Recalled LHPs Kyle Ryan and Justin Steele from Iowa. Activated RHP Rowan Wick from the IL. Optioned LHP Kyle Ryan and RHP Trevor Megill to Iowa.
August 11	Activated RHP Rowan Wick from IL. Optioned LHP Kyle Ryan to Iowa.
August 12	Placed C Willson Contreras on the 10-day IL. Released RHP Jake Arrieta. Designated LHP Kyle Ryan for assignment. Selected the contract of RHP Ryan Meisinger from Iowa. Activated C Austin Romine.
August 14	Placed RHP Adbert Alzolay on the 10-day IL. Recalled RHP Trevor Megill from Iowa.
August 15	Activated OF Jason Heyward from IL. Optioned IF Greg Deichmann to Iowa.
August 17	Designated RHP Dan Winkler for assignment. Selected the contract of OF Michael Hermosillo from Iowa.
August 18	Designated OF Johneshwy Fargas for assignment. Selected the contract of RHP Adrian Sampson from Iowa.
August 19	Signed free agent RHP Marcus Walden to a minor league contract.
August 20	Released RHP Dan Winkler. Sent OF Johneshwy Fargas outright to Iowa.
August 21	Recalled RHP Keegan Thompson from Iowa. Optioned RHP Jake Jewell to Iowa.
August 25	Recalled RHP Jake Jewell from Iowa.
August 26	Optioned RHP Jake Jewell to Iowa.
August 28	Designated RHPs Jake Jewell and Ryan Meisinger for assignment. Placed IF David Bote on 10-day IL. Selected the contract of RHP Scott Effross and IF Alfonso Rivas from Iowa.

==== September ====
September 1	Activated RHPs Adbert Alzolay and Dillon Maples from IL.
September 4	Activated C Willson Contreras from the IL. Placed RHP Keegan Thompson on 10-day IL.
September 6	Activated IF David Bote from 10-day IL. Designated IF Austin Romine for assignment.
September 8	Placed OF Michael Hermosillo on the 10-day IL. Selected the contract of OF Nick Martini from Iowa. Sent IF Austin Romine outright to Iowa.
September 10	Placed LHP Adam Morgan on the bereavement list. Recalled RHP Tommy Nance from Iowa. Signed free agent Jackson McClelland to a minor league contract.
September 14	Placed OF Jason Heyward on the 7-day concussion IL. Placed OF Michael Hermosillo on the 60-day IL. Selected the contract of OF Trayce Thompson from Iowa.
September 17	Placed RHP Manuel Rodriguez on the 10-day IL. Activated LHP Adam Morgan from the bereavement list.
September 19	Activated IF Nico Hoerner and RHP Keegan Thompson from the IL. Optioned OF Nick Martini to Iowa. Designated RHP Dillon Maples for assignment.
September 21	Placed OF Jason Heyward and IF Alfonso Rivas on the 10-day IL. Recalled OF Nick Martini from Iowa. Outrighted RHP Dillon Maples to Iowa.
September 24	Selected the contract of RHP Jason Adam from Iowa. Recalled IF Greg Deichmann from Iowa. Placed C Robinson Chirinos on 10-day IL.
September 25	Sent RHP Jason Adam to Iowa.
September 28	Placed RHP Keegan Thompson on 10-day IL. Recalled RHP Jason Adam from Iowa.
September 29	Placed IF Patrick Wisdom on 10-day IL. Selected the contract of IF Trent Giambrone from Iowa.
September 30	Placed C Austin Romine on 10-day IL. Selected the contract of C Erick Castillo from Iowa.

==== October ====
October 1	Placed OF Nick Martini, IFs David Bote and Nico Hoerner on 10-day IL. Recalled RHP Cory Abbot from Iowa. Selected the contracts of IF Tyler Ladendorf and OF Johneshwy Fargas from Iowa.
October 2	Placed RHP Tommy Nance on 10-day IL. Selected the contract of RHP Joe Biagini from Iowa.
October 3	Placed C Willson Contreras on 10-day IL. Selected the contract of C Tyler Payne from Iowa. Placed IF Alfonso Rivas on the 60-day IL.

== Roster ==
2021 Chicago Cubs
Roster
Pitchers: 15 Cory Abbott; 60 Jason Adam; 73 Adbert Alzolay; 49 Jake Arrieta; 41 Joe Biagini; 48 Rex Brothers; 39 Andrew Chafin; 27 Zach Davies; 57 Scott Effross; 28 Kyle Hendricks; 12 Codi Heuer; 65 Jake Jewell; 46 Craig Kimbrel; 36 Dillon Maples; 74 Trevor Megill; 64 Ryan Meisinger; 29 Shelby Miller; 30 Alec Mills; 47 Adam Morgan; 45 Tommy Nance; 39 Manuel Rodríguez; 59 Michael Rucker; 56 Kyle Ryan; 56 Adrian Sampson; 35 Justin Steele; 37 Kohl Stewart; 89 Robert Stock; 64 Pedro Strop; 18 Ryan Tepera; 71 Keegan Thompson; 50 Rowan Wick; 38 Brad Wieck; 32 Trevor Williams; 43 Dan Winkler; 45 Brandon Workman	Catchers: 87 Erick Castillo; 29 Robinson Chirinos; 40 Willson Contreras; 57 Taylor Gushue; 20 P. J. Higgins; 7 José Lobatón; 96 Tyler Payne; 25 Austin Romine; 11 Tony Wolters; Infielders: 51 Sergio Alcántara; 9 Javier Báez; 13 David Bote; 17 Kris Bryant; 5 Matt Duffy; 85 Trent Giambrone; 2 Nico Hoerner; 44 Anthony Rizzo; 24 Andrew Romine; 18 Frank Schwindel; 4 Eric Sogard; 16 Ildemaro Vargas; 16 Patrick Wisdom	Outfielders: 6 Greg Deichmann; 4 Johneshwy Fargas; 8 Ian Happ; 32 Michael Hermosillo; 22 Jason Heyward; 6 Jake Marisnick; 62 Nick Martini; 66 Rafael Ortega; 24 Joc Pederson; 67 Alfonso Rivas; 43 Trayce Thompson; Other batters: 84 Tyler Ladendorf	Manager: 3 David Ross; Coaches: 58 Mike Borzello (associate pitching/catching/strategy); 63 Juan Cabreja (staff assistant); 81 Craig Driver (first base/catching); 91 Kyle Evans (Major League data and development); 19 Andy Green (bench); 33 Willie Harris (third base); 68 Tommy Hottovy (pitching); 99 Anthony Iapoce (hitting); 90 Jonathan Mota (staff assistant); 55 Mike Napoli (quality assurance); 95 Chad Noble (bullpen catcher); 53 Chris Valaika (assistant hitting); 54 Chris Young (bullpen)

== Statistics ==
=== Batting ===
(final stats)
Note: G = Games played; AB = At bats; R = Runs; H = Hits; 2B = Doubles; 3B = Triples; HR = Home runs; RBI = Runs batted in; SB = Stolen bases; BB = Walks; K = Strikeouts; AVG = Batting average; OBP = On-base percentage; SLG = Slugging percentage; TB = Total bases

Player	G	AB	R	H	2B	3B	HR	RBI	SB	BB	K	AVG	OBP	SLG	TB
Cory Abbott	8	3	0	1	0	0	0	0	0	0	1	.333	.333	.333	1
Sergio Alcántara	89	220	30	45	6	3	5	17	3	30	71	.205	.303	.327	72
Adbert Alzolay	28	31	1	2	1	0	0	0	0	1	13	.065	.094	.097	3
Jake Arrieta	20	21	2	2	0	0	0	0	0	2	16	.095	.208	.095	2
Javier Báez	91	335	48	83	9	2	22	65	13	15	131	.248	.292	.484	162
David Bote	97	291	32	58	10	2	8	35	0	27	73	.199	.276	.330	96
Rex Brothers	54	2	0	0	0	0	0	0	0	0	2	.000	.000	.000	0
Kris Bryant	93	326	58	87	19	2	18	51	4	39	89	.267	.358	.503	164
Erick Castillo	4	8	0	2	0	0	0	0	0	1	1	.250	.333	.250	2
Robinson Chirinos	45	97	13	22	5	1	5	15	0	9	36	.227	.324	.454	44
Willson Contreras	128	413	61	98	20	0	21	57	5	52	138	.237	.340	.438	181
Zach Davies	31	34	2	6	0	0	0	2	0	0	8	.176	.176	.176	6
Greg Deichmann	14	30	0	4	0	0	0	1	0	1	14	.133	.161	.133	4
Matt Duffy	97	289	45	83	12	0	5	30	8	25	63	.287	.357	.381	110
Johneshwy Fargas	15	31	3	7	0	1	0	2	1	2	8	.226	.250	.290	9
Trent Giambrone	5	13	0	2	0	0	0	0	0	0	4	.154	.154	.154	2
Taylor Gushue	2	4	0	0	0	0	0	0	0	0	3	.000	.000	.000	0
Ian Happ	148	465	63	105	20	1	25	66	9	62	156	.226	.323	.434	202
Kyle Hendricks	30	52	3	6	1	0	0	1	0	2	26	.115	.148	.135	7
Michael Hermosillo	16	36	5	7	2	0	3	7	0	1	12	.194	.237	.500	18
Jason Heyward	31	323	35	69	15	2	8	30	5	27	68	.214	.280	.347	112
P. J. Higgins	9	23	1	1	0	0	0	0	0	2	8	.043	.120	.043	1
Nico Hoerner	44	149	13	45	10	0	0	16	5	17	25	.302	.382	.369	55
Jake Jewell	10	1	0	0	0	0	0	0	0	0	1	.000	.000	.000	0
Tyler Ladendorf	1	1	0	0	0	0	0	0	0	0	0	.000	.000	.000	0
Craig Kimbrel	37	1	0	0	0	0	0	0	0	0	1	.000	.000	.000	0
José Lobatón	6	11	1	0	0	0	0	0	0	2	5	.000	.154	.000	0
Jake Marisnick	65	128	17	29	6	3	5	22	3	9	43	.227	.294	.438	56
Nick Martini	25	37	4	10	1	0	0	4	0	6	10	.270	.356	.297	11
Alec Mills	36	32	1	1	1	0	0	0	0	0	26	.034	.034	.063	2
Tommy Nance	27	2	0	0	0	0	0	0	0	0	1	.000	.000	.000	0
Rafael Ortega	103	296	44	86	14	2	11	33	12	30	70	.291	.360	.463	137
Tyler Payne	1	2	0	0	0	0	0	0	0	0	2	.000	.000	.000	0
Joc Pederson	73	256	35	59	11	2	11	39	2	22	74	.230	.300	.418	107
Alfonso Rivas	18	44	7	14	1	0	1	3	0	4	16	.318	.388	.409	18
Anthony Rizzo	92	323	41	80	16	3	14	40	4	36	59	.248	.346	.446	144
Manuel Rodriguez	17	1	0	0	0	0	0	0	0	0	1	.000	.000	.000	0
Andrew Romine	26	60	7	11	2	0	1	5	0	4	24	.183	.234	.267	16
Austin Romine	28	60	5	13	2	0	1	5	0	2	22	.217	.242	.300	18
Michael Rucker	19	1	0	0	0	0	0	0	0	0	1	.000	.000	.000	0
Kyle Ryan	13	2	0	0	0	0	0	0	0	0	0	.000	.000	.000	0
Adrian Sampson	10	7	0	0	0	0	0	0	0	0	7	.000	.000	.000	0
Frank Schwindel	56	222	42	76	19	1	13	40	2	16	36	.342	.389	.613	136
Eric Sogard	78	169	16	42	6	1	1	12	3	9	30	.249	.283	.314	53
Justin Steele	17	13	3	2	0	0	0	0	0	0	4	.154	.154	.154	2
Kohl Stewart	4	3	0	1	0	0	0	0	0	0	1	.333	.333	.333	1
Robert Stock	1	2	0	0	0	0	0	0	0	0	1	.000	.000	.000	0
Keegan Thompson	29	6	0	1	0	0	0	0	0	0	3	.167	.167	.167	2
Ildemaro Vargas	9	21	3	3	2	0	0	2	1	3	7	.143	.250	.238	5
Trevor Williams	12	18	1	4	0	0	0	1	0	1	6	.222	.263	.222	4
Dan Winkler	45	1	0	0	0	0	0	0	0	0	0	.000	.000	.000	0
Patrick Wisdom	106	338	54	78	13	0	28	61	4	32	153	.231	.305	.518	175
Tony Wolters	14	24	3	3	0	0	0	0	0	5	12	.125	.276	.125	3
TEAM TOTALS	162	5306	705	1255	225	26	210	672	86	502	1596	.237	.312	.407	2162

=== Pitching ===
(final statistics)

Note: W = Wins; L = Losses; ERA = Earned run average; G = Games pitched; GS = Games started; SV = Saves; IP = Innings pitched; H = Hits allowed; R = Runs allowed; ER = Earned runs allowed; BB = Walks allowed; K = Strikeouts

Player	W	L	ERA	G	GS	SV	IP	H	R	ER	BB	K
Cory Abbott	0	0	6.75	7	1	0	17.1	20	15	13	11	12
Jason Adam	1	0	5.91	12	0	0	10.2	10	7	7	6	19
Sergio Alcántara	0	0	0.00	1	0	0	0.1	0	0	0	0	0
Adbert Alzolay	5	13	4.58	29	21	1	125.2	112	66	64	34	128
Jake Arrieta	5	11	6.68	20	20	0	86.1	113	75	66	39	74
Joe Biagini	1	0	0.00	1	0	0	3.0	2	0	0	1	2
Rex Brothers	3	2	5.26	57	0	1	53.0	41	31	31	35	75
Andrew Chafin	0	2	2.06	43	0	0	39.1	21	9	9	12	37
Zach Davies	6	12	5.78	32	32	0	148.0	162	99	95	75	114
Matt Duffy	0	0	0.00	1	0	0	0.1	0	0	0	0	0
Scott Effross	2	1	3.68	14	0	0	14.2	13	6	6	1	18
Kyle Hendricks	14	7	4.77	32	32	0	181.0	200	101	96	44	131
Codi Heuer	3	3	3.14	25	0	2	28.2	20	12	10	13	17
Jake Jewell	0	2	9.90	10	0	0	10.0	18	12	11	5	10
Craig Kimbrel	2	3	0.49	39	0	23	36.2	13	6	2	13	64
Dillon Maples	1	0	2.59	28	0	0	31.1	15	10	9	25	40
Trevor Megill	1	2	8.37	0	0	0	23.2	36	24	22	8	30
Ryan Meisinger	0	0	12.27	7	0	0	7.1	11	10	10	5	6
Shelby Miller	0	0	31.50	3	0	0	2.0	7	7	7	5	1
Alec Mills	6	7	5.07	32	20	1	119.0	137	75	67	34	87
Adam Morgan	2	1	4.26	34	0	2	25.1	22	15	12	12	28
Tommy Nance	1	1	7.22	27	0	0	28.2	25	23	23	13	30
Anthony Rizzo	0	0	0.00	1	0	0	0.2	0	0	0	1	1
Manuel Rodríguez	3	3	6.11	20	0	1	17.2	18	18	12	12	16
Andrew Romine	0	0	9.00	1	0	0	1.0	2	1	1	0	1
Michael Rucker	0	0	20	0	0	1	28.1	32	25	22	11	30
Kyle Ryan	0	0	6.75	13	0	1	13.1	17	10	10	6	8
Adrian Sampson	1	2	2.80	10	5	0	35.1	30	15	11	8	28
Eric Sogard	0	0	6.23	5	0	0	4.1	7	3	3	0	1
Justin Steele	4	4	4.26	20	9	0	57.0	50	29	27	27	59
Kohl Stewart	1	1	5.27	4	3	0	13.2	17	12	8	6	11
Robert Stock	0	1	11.25	1	1	0	4.0	4	5	5	6	3
Pedro Strop	1	0	0.00	2	0	0	2.0	2	0	0	2	3
Ryan Tepera	0	2	2.91	43	0	1	43.1	22	14	14	12	50
Keegan Thompson	3	3	3.38	32	6	1	53.1	48	22	20	31	55
Rowan Wick	0	1	4.30	22	0	5	23.0	17	12	11	14	29
Brad Wieck	0	0	0.00	15	0	0	17.0	10	0	0	10	28
Trevor Williams	4	2	5.06	13	12	0	58.2	68	37	33	22	61
Dan Winkler	1	3	5.22	47	0	0	39.2	32	24	23	30	40
Brandon Workman	0	2	6.75	10	0	0	8.0	12	9	6	7	11
TEAM TOTALS	71	91	4.87	162	162	40	1412.2	1386	839	765	596	1358

== Farm system ==
Due to MLB's change in the minor league system, teams had the opportunity to change minor league affiliations. However, it was announced on December 9, 2020, that the Cubs would retain the same four minor league teams: Iowa (AAA), Tennessee (AA), South Bend (now high-A), and Myrtle Beach (low-A).

Level	Team	League	Manager	Location	Ballpark
AAA	Iowa Cubs	Triple-A East	Marty Pevey	Des Moines, Iowa	Principal Park
AA	Tennessee Smokies	Double-A South	Mark Johnson	Knoxville, Tennessee	Smokies Stadium
High-A	South Bend Cubs	High-A Central	Michael Ryan	South Bend, Indiana	Four Winds Field at Coveleski Stadium
Low-A	Myrtle Beach Pelicans	Low-A East	Buddy Bailey	Myrtle Beach, South Carolina	TicketReturn.com Field
Rookie	ACL Cubs	Arizona Complex League	Lance Rymel	Mesa, Arizona	Sloan Park
Rookie	DSL Cubs	Dominican Summer League	Jovanny Rosario; Carlos Ramirez	Boca Chica, Dominican Republic	Baseball City Complex
