= Erick Castillo (baseball) =

Venezuelan baseball player (born 1993)

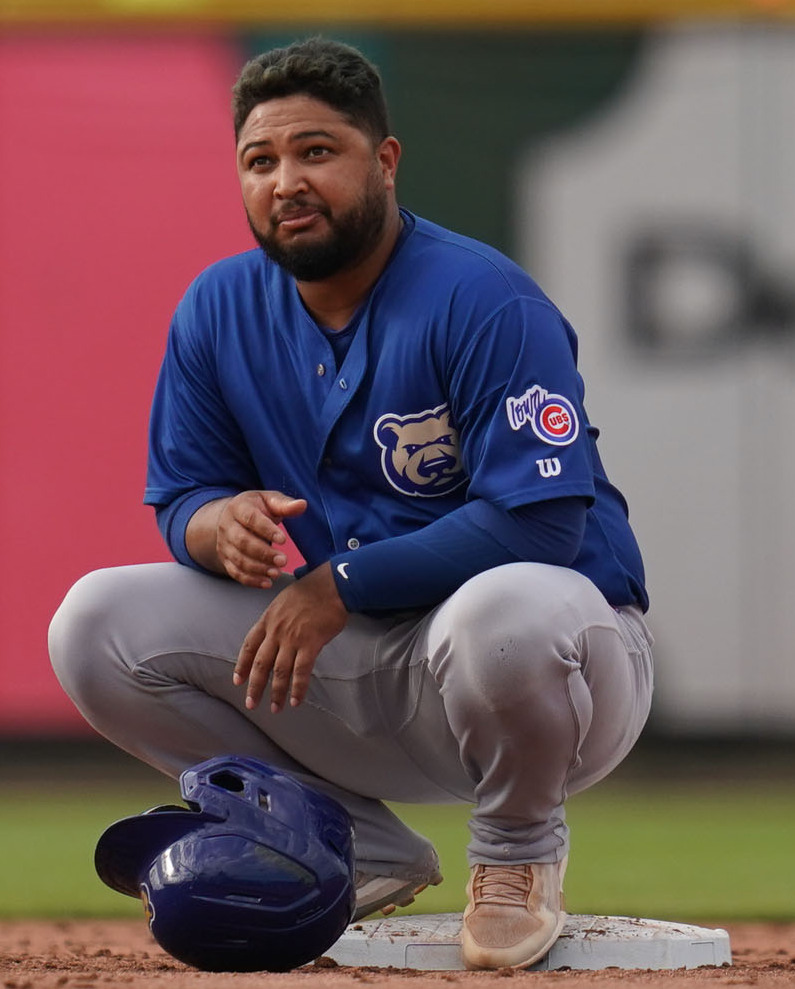
- Castillo with the Iowa Cubs in 2022

Chicago Cubs – No. 93
- Catcher / Coach
- Born: February 25, 1993 (age 33); Araure, Venezuela
- Batted: Right Threw: Right

MLB debut
- September 30, 2021, for the Chicago Cubs

Last MLB appearance
- October 3, 2021, for the Chicago Cubs

MLB statistics
- Batting average: .250
- Home runs: 0
- Runs batted in: 0
- Stats at Baseball Reference

Teams
- As player: Chicago Cubs (2021); As coach: Chicago Cubs (2024–present)

Erick José Castillo (born February 25, 1993) is a Venezuelan former professional baseball catcher. He has previously played in Major League Baseball (MLB) for the Chicago Cubs. He has served as a bullpen catcher for the Cubs since 2024.

== Career ==
Castillo signed with the Chicago Cubs as an international free agent on November 16, 2010, and made his professional debut in 2012. Castillo did not play in a game in 2020 due to the cancellation of the minor league season because of the COVID-19 pandemic. He elected free agency on November 2, 2020. On March 27, 2021, Castillo re–signed with the Cubs organization on a minor league contract. He split the 2021 season between the Tennessee Smokies of the Double-A South and the Iowa Cubs of the Triple-A East, slashing .199/.307/.246 with one home run and 19 RBI over 57 games.

On September 30, 2021, the Cubs selected Castillo's contract and promoted him to the major leagues. He made his MLB debut that night. He recorded his first major league hit, a single, on October 1 versus Alex Reyes of the St. Louis Cardinals. He was designated for assignment by the team on October 18, and was assigned outright to Iowa two days later.

Castillo spent the 2022 campaign with Triple-A Iowa, playing in 36 games and slashing .237/.296/.254 with no home runs and 12 RBI. He elected free agency following the season on November 10, 2022.

== Coaching Career ==
In 2024, Castillo was named as a bullpen catcher for the Chicago Cubs.
