= Johneshwy Fargas =

Puerto Rican baseball player (born 1994)

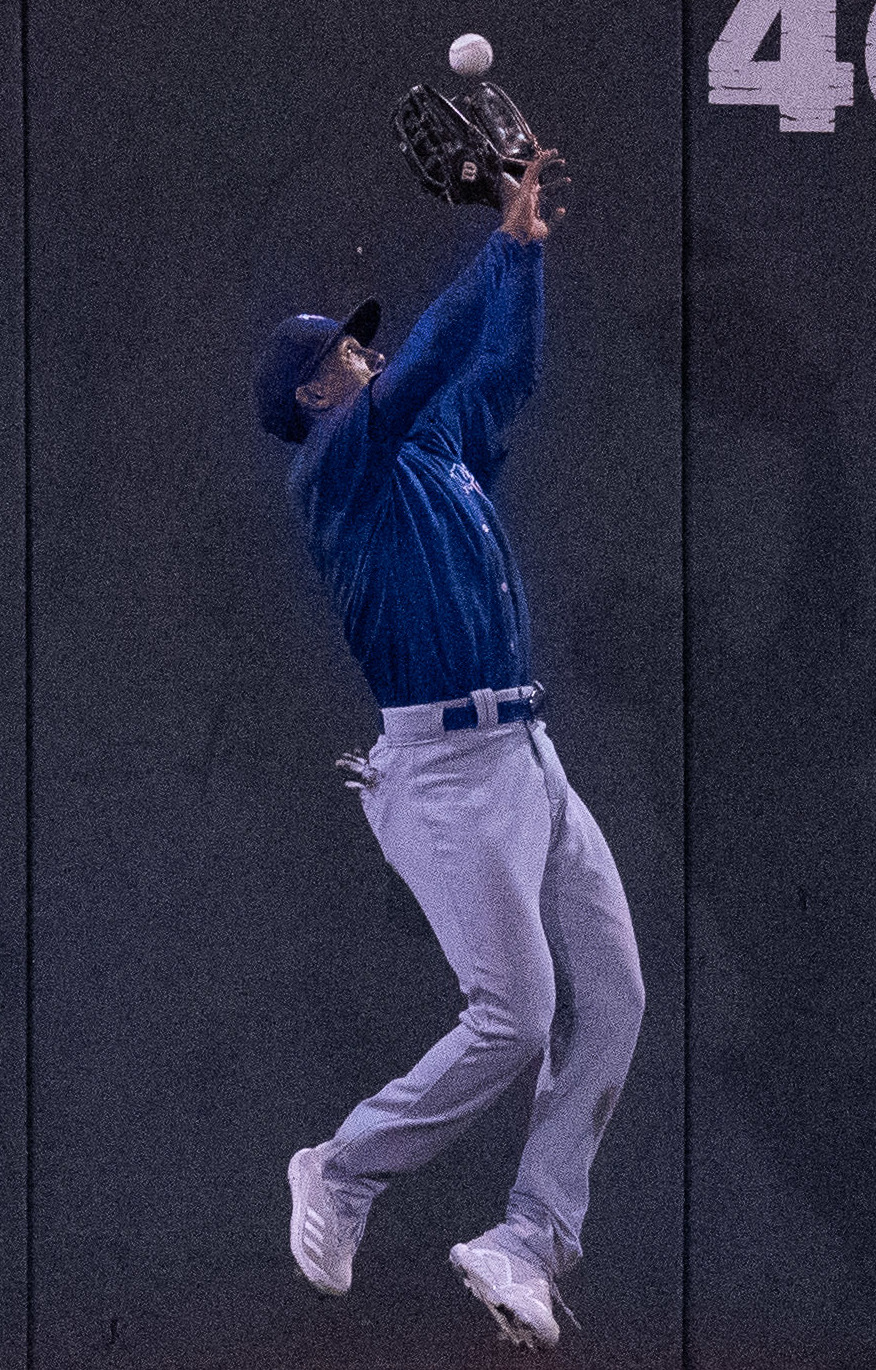
- Fargas with the Iowa Cubs in 2021

Charros de Jalisco – No. 48
- Outfielder
- Born: December 15, 1994 (age 31); Trujillo Alto, Puerto Rico
- Bats: Right Throws: Right

MLB debut
- May 17, 2021, for the New York Mets

MLB statistics (through 2021 season)
- Batting average: .250
- Home runs: 0
- Runs batted in: 5
- Stats at Baseball Reference

Teams
- New York Mets (2021); Chicago Cubs (2021)

Johneshwy Ali Fargas (juh-NESH-wee; born December 15, 1994) is a Puerto Rican professional baseball outfielder for the Charros de Jalisco of the Mexican League. He has previously played in Major League Baseball (MLB) for the New York Mets and Chicago Cubs. Fargas was drafted by the San Francisco Giants in the 11th round of the 2013 Major League Baseball draft.

== Professional career ==
=== San Francisco Giants ===
Fargas was drafted by the San Francisco Giants in the 11th round of the 2013 MLB draft. He made his professional debut with the Arizona League Giants. In 2014, he played for the Low-A Salem-Keizer Volcanoes, slashing .240/.373/.329 with three home runs and 13 RBI. He played for the Single-A Augusta GreenJackets, in 2015, hitting .278/.347/.349 with two home runs and 35 RBI in 102 games. He split 2016 between the High-A San Jose Giants and Augusta, accumulating a .242/.313/.311 in 119 games between the two teams. The next year, Fargas again played for San Jose and Augusta, slashing .200/.256/.314.

Fargas played the 2018 season in San Jose, batting .288/.354/.421 and leading the California League with 47 stolen bases. In 2019, Fargas played for the Double-A Richmond Flying Squirrels, hitting .249/.325/.334 and leading the Eastern League with 50 stolen bases in 127 games. He elected free agency following the season on November 4, 2019.

=== New York Mets ===
On January 9, 2020, Fargas signed a minor league contract with the New York Mets organization that included an invitation to spring training. During a spring training game against the St. Louis Cardinals, Fargas hit for the cycle. Fargas did not play in a game in 2020 due to the cancellation of the minor league season because of the COVID-19 pandemic. He was added to the Mets’ 60-man player pool for the abbreviated season, but spent the year at the alternate training site.

Fargas re-signed with the Mets on a new minor league deal on November 4, 2020. On May 17, 2021, Fargas was selected to the 40-man roster and promoted to the major leagues for the first time following injuries to outfielders Brandon Nimmo, Albert Almora and Michael Conforto. He made his MLB debut that day as the starting center fielder against the Atlanta Braves. In the game, Fargas recorded his first career hit, an RBI double off of Braves pitcher Sean Newcomb. He started each of the team's following six games before running into the outfield wall at Citi Field and suffering a shoulder sprain on May 24. On July 19, Fargas was designated for assignment by the Mets. In 7 games, he had gone 6-for-21 (.286) with 3 RBI.

=== Chicago Cubs ===
On July 23, 2021, Fargas was claimed off of waivers by the Chicago Cubs. He was then assigned to the Triple-A Iowa Cubs. On 31 July 31, Fargas was recalled by the Cubs. In 13 games for the Cubs, Fargas hit .269 with no home runs and two RBI. On August 18, he was designated for assignment by the Cubs. On August 20, Fargas cleared waivers and was assigned outright to Triple-A Iowa. At the very end of the Cubs' season he was added to the team's roster as a COVID-19 replacement and was removed on 18 October 2021.

=== New York Mets (second stint) ===
On March 5, 2022, Fargas signed a minor league contract to return to the New York Mets. He played in 38 games each for the Double-A Binghamton Rumble Ponies and Triple-A Syracuse Mets. In his 76 total games, in which he made 301 plate appearances, Fargas hit .212/.305/.340 with 8 home runs, 32 RBI, and 28 stolen bases. On August 15, Fargas was released by the Mets organization.

=== Kansas City Monarchs ===
On May 13, 2023, Fargas signed with the Kansas City Monarchs of the American Association of Professional Baseball. In 27 games for the Monarchs, Fargas hit .348/.391/.509 with 2 home runs, 15 RBI, and 19 stolen bases.

=== Saraperos de Saltillo ===
On June 19, 2023, Fargas' contract was purchased by the Saraperos de Saltillo of the Mexican League. In 41 games for Saltillo, he slashed .267/.316/.352 with two home runs, 18 RBI, and 19 stolen bases.

In 2024, Fargas appeared in 67 games, hitting .282/.330/.421 with five home runs, 25 RBI, and 15 stolen bases.

=== Charros de Jalisco ===
On October 9, 2024, Fargas was traded to the Charros de Jalisco of the Mexican League. In 79 games he hit .339/.389/.548 with 14 home runs, 55 RBIs and 38 stolen bases.
