= Trent Giambrone =

American baseball player (born 1993)

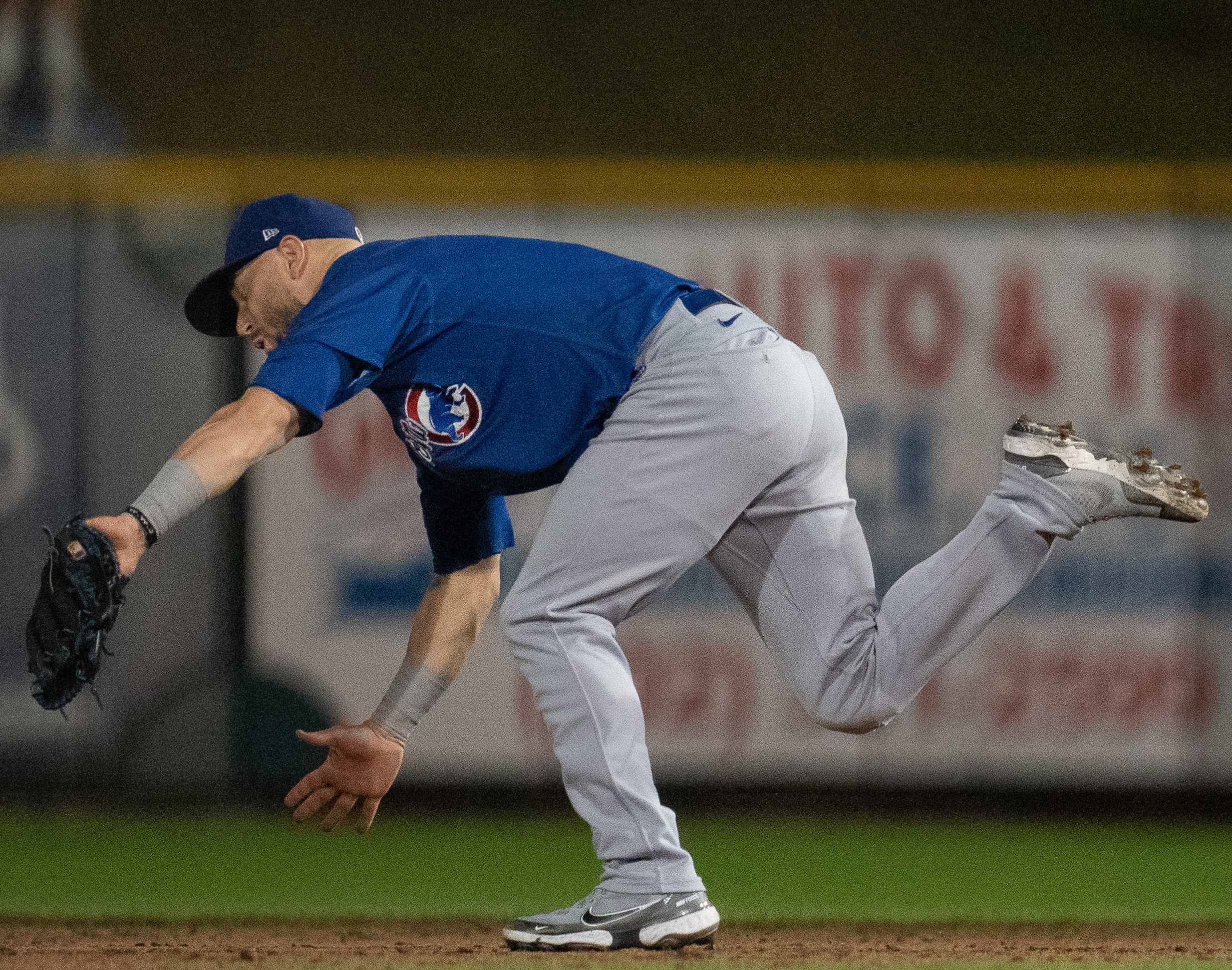
- Giambrone with the Iowa Cubs in 2021
- Infielder
- Born: December 20, 1993 (age 32); Metairie, Louisiana, U.S.
- Batted: Right Threw: Right

MLB debut
- September 29, 2021, for the Chicago Cubs

Last MLB appearance
- October 3, 2021, for the Chicago Cubs

MLB statistics
- Batting average: .154
- Home runs: 0
- Runs batted in: 0
- Stats at Baseball Reference

Teams
- Chicago Cubs (2021)

Trent Joseph Giambrone (born December 20, 1993) is an American former professional baseball infielder. He played in Major League Baseball (MLB) for the Chicago Cubs.

== Amateur career ==
Giambrone attended Grace King High School in Metairie, Louisiana. He was drafted out of high school by the Los Angeles Dodgers in the 30th round of the 2012 MLB draft, but did not sign and instead attended Jones County Junior College in Ellisville, Mississippi to play college baseball for two seasons. He won the MACJC State Championship game with Jones County in 2014. Giambrone then transferred to Delta State University where he played two seasons for the Statesmen. He hit .386/.433/.601/1.034 with 9 home runs and 52 RBI during his senior season in 2016. Giambrone was drafted by the Chicago Cubs in the 25th round of the 2016 MLB draft and signed with them for a $1,000 signing bonus.

== Professional career ==
=== Chicago Cubs ===
Giambrone spent his professional debut season of 2016 with the Eugene Emeralds, hitting .292/.404/.433 with 4 home runs and 22 RBI. He spent the 2017 season with the Myrtle Beach Pelicans, hitting .242/.297/.348 with 12 home runs and 44 RBI. Giambrone spent the 2018 season with the Tennessee Smokies, hitting .251/.333/.440 with 17 home runs and 49 RBI. Following the 2018 season, he played in the Arizona Fall League for the Mesa Solar Sox. Giambrone spent the 2019 season with the Iowa Cubs, hitting .241/.314/.464 with 23 home runs and 66 RBI. He did not play in 2020 due to the cancellation of the Minor League Baseball season because of the COVID-19 pandemic. Assigned back to Iowa for the 2021 minor league season, he hit .174/.274/.255 with 3 home runs and 16 RBI.

On September 29, 2021, Giambrone was selected to the 40-man roster and promoted to the major leagues for the first time. He made his MLB debut that same day. Giambrone went 2-for-13 in 5 games with the Cubs. He was outrighted off the 40-man roster on November 5.

Giambrone spent the 2022 season back with Iowa. Playing in 89 games, he slashed .188/.281/.270 with 3 home runs, 20 RBI, and 11 stolen bases. He elected free agency following the season on November 10.

=== York Revolution ===
On April 17, 2023, Giambrone signed with the York Revolution of the Atlantic League of Professional Baseball. In 107 games for York, Giambrone batted .287/.369/.504 with 22 home runs, a career–high 72 RBI, and 9 stolen bases.

=== Cleburne Railroaders ===
On December 20, 2023, Giambrone signed with the Algodoneros de Unión Laguna of the Mexican League. However, on April 2, 2024, Giambrone was released by Unión Laguna.

On May 1, 2024, Giambrone signed with the Cleburne Railroaders of the American Association of Professional Baseball. In 15 games for Cleburne, he hit .164/.246/.309 with two home runs and four RBI.

=== Kansas City Monarchs ===
On May 27, 2024, Giambrone was traded to the Kansas City Monarchs of the American Association of Professional Baseball in exchange for Jake Cantleberry. In 58 games for the Monarchs, he slashed .298/.366/.445 with seven home runs and 40 RBI. Giambrone was released by Kansas City on August 19.
