= Greg Deichmann =

American baseball player (born 1995)

- Outfielder
- Born: May 31, 1995 (age 31); Metairie, Louisiana, U.S.
- Batted: Left Threw: Right

MLB debut
- August 6, 2021, for the Chicago Cubs

Last MLB appearance
- October 3, 2021, for the Chicago Cubs

MLB statistics
- Batting average: .133
- Home runs: 0
- Runs batted in: 1
- Stats at Baseball Reference

Teams
- Chicago Cubs (2021)

Gregory Arthur Deichmann Jr. (born May 31, 1995) is an American former professional baseball outfielder. He played in Major League Baseball (MLB) for the Chicago Cubs. He played college baseball at Louisiana State University. He was selected by the Oakland Athletics in the second round of the 2017 MLB draft.

== Amateur career ==
Deichmann attended Brother Martin High School in New Orleans, Louisiana. As a senior, he was the New Orleans Advocate Player of the Year. He was not drafted out of high school and attended Louisiana State University (LSU), where he played college baseball for the Tigers.

As a freshman at LSU in 2015, Deichmann played in only ten games due to a foot injury and had eight hitless at-bats. As a sophomore in 2016 he played in 64 games as a first baseman, designated hitter, and third baseman. In 236 at-bats, he hit .288/.346/.513 with 11 home runs and 57 runs batted in (RBIs). He was drafted by the Minnesota Twins in the 26th round of the 2016 Major League Baseball draft, but did not sign and returned to LSU. After the 2016 season, he played collegiate summer baseball with the Bourne Braves of the Cape Cod Baseball League. Deichmann moved to the outfield and was named a consensus All-American in 2017. Against Hofstra that season, he hit a home run out of Alex Box Stadium that traveled an estimated 486 feet. Over 72 games for the 2017 season, he hit .308 with 19 home runs and 73 RBIs.

== Professional career ==
=== Oakland Athletics ===
Deichmann was selected by the Oakland Athletics in the second round, 43rd overall, of the 2017 Major League Baseball draft. He signed with Oakland and was assigned to the Low-A Vermont Lake Monsters where he batted .274 with eight home runs and thirty RBIs in 46 games. In 2018, he was assigned to the High-A Stockton Ports but dealt with various hand injuries and played in only 47 games, hitting .199 with six home runs and 21 RBIs. He spent 2019 with the Midland RockHounds of the Double-A Texas League. Over eighty games, he batted .219/.300/.375 with 11 home runs, 36 RBIs, and 19 stolen bases. He was selected to play in the Arizona Fall League for the Mesa Solar Sox following the season.

Deichmann did not play in a game in 2020 due to the cancellation of the minor league season because of the COVID-19 pandemic. The Athletics added Deichmann to their 40-man roster after the 2020 season. To begin the 2021 season, he was assigned to the Las Vegas Aviators of the Triple-A West. In 60 games with Las Vegas, Deichmann slashed .300/.433/.452 with 4 home runs and 35 RBI.

=== Chicago Cubs ===
On July 27, 2021, Deichmann was traded to the Chicago Cubs along with Daniel Palencia in exchange for Andrew Chafin. He was assigned to the Iowa Cubs. On August 6, 2021, Deichmann was recalled to the Cubs to make his big league debut that day.

On April 16, 2022, Deichmann was designated for assignment by the Cubs. On April 22, Deichmann was outrighted to Triple-A Iowa. He played in 78 games for the Triple-A Iowa Cubs, slashing .214/.271/.335 with 7 home runs, 33 RBI, and 8 stolen bases. On August 22, Deichmann was released by the Cubs.

=== Oakland Athletics (second stint) ===
On February 16, 2023, Deichmann signed a minor league contract with the Oakland Athletics organization. He played in 108 games split between the Double–A Midland RockHounds and Triple–A Las Vegas Aviators, compiling a .245/.324/.467 batting line with 19 home runs, 61 RBI, and 16 stolen bases. Deichmann elected free agency following the season on November 6.
