= Michael Hermosillo =

American baseball player (born 1995)

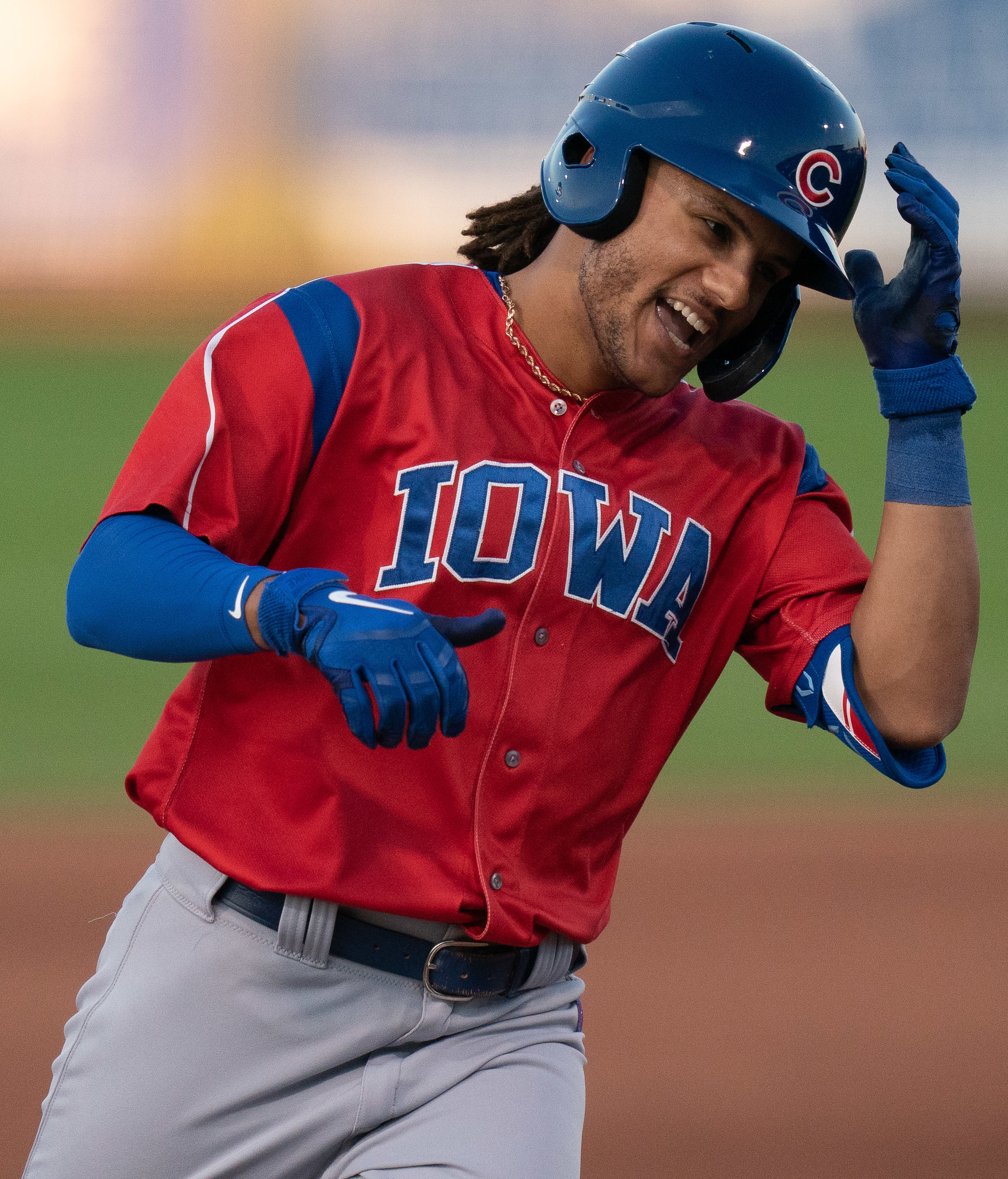
- Hermosillo with the Iowa Cubs in 2021
- Outfielder
- Born: January 17, 1995 (age 31); Mesa, Arizona, U.S.
- Batted: Right Threw: Right

MLB debut
- May 18, 2018, for the Los Angeles Angels

Last MLB appearance
- September 25, 2022, for the Chicago Cubs

MLB statistics
- Batting average: .167
- Home runs: 4
- Runs batted in: 17
- Stats at Baseball Reference

Teams
- Los Angeles Angels (2018–2020); Chicago Cubs (2021–2022)

Michael Hermosillo (born January 17, 1995) is an American former professional baseball outfielder. He played in Major League Baseball (MLB) for the Los Angeles Angels and Chicago Cubs. Hermosillo was drafted by the Angels in the 28th round of the 2013 MLB draft. He made his MLB debut in 2018.

== Early life ==
Hermosillo was born in Mesa, Arizona. He attended Ottawa Township High School in Ottawa, Illinois. Along with baseball, he also played football in high school and had committed to the University of Illinois to play college football and college baseball.

Hermosillo participated in the Chicago White Sox Double Duty Classic in 2012 and 2013.

== Playing career ==
=== Los Angeles Angels ===
Hermosillo was drafted by the Los Angeles Angels in the 28th round of the 2013 Major League Baseball draft. He signed with the Angels rather than attend Illinois. He made his professional debut with the Arizona League Angels that same year and played in 11 games.

Hermosillo played 2014 with the Orem Owlz where he batted .244 with three home runs and 23 RBIs in 54 games, 2015 with Orem and the Burlington Bees where he slashed .231/.344/.263 in 93 games, and 2016 with Burlington and the Inland Empire 66ers where he batted .317./.402/.467 with six home runs and 39 RBIs in 77 games. After the 2016 season he played in the Arizona Fall League.

He started 2017 with Inland Empire and was promoted to the Mobile BayBears and Salt Lake Bees during the season. In 120 total games between the three teams, he batted .267 with nine home runs, 44 RBIs, and 35 stolen bases. The Angels added him to their 40-man roster after the season.

He began 2018 with Salt Lake, for whom he batted .267/.357/.480 with 12 home runs and 10 stolen bases for the season.

He made his Major League debut on May 18, 2018. He was called back up on June 3 in place of Kole Calhoun. In 2018 with the Angels he batted .211/.274/.333 with 1 home run and 1 RBI in 57 at bats. In 2019 for Los Angeles, Hermosillo hit .139/.304/.222 with 3 RBI and no homers in 36 at–bats. In 2020, Hermosillo only stepped up to the plate 10 times, and had 2 hits, 2 RBI and a stolen base before he was designated for assignment on August 23, 2020. He became a free agent on November 2.

=== Chicago Cubs ===
On December 2, 2020, Hermosillo signed a minor league contract with the Chicago Cubs organization. He was assigned to the Triple-A Iowa Cubs to begin the season. On August 17, 2021, Hermosillo's contract was selected by the Cubs. Appearing in 16 games, Hermosillo hit .194/.237/.500 with 3 home runs and 7 RBI. On November 30, Hermosillo was non-tendered by the Cubs, making him a free agent.

On December 1, 2021, Hermosillo re-signed with the Cubs on a one-year contract. He suffered a quadriceps strain on May 8, and was transferred to the 60-day injured list on June 30. He was activated from the injured list on September 6. Hermosillo was designated for assignment by Chicago on September 27, and sent outright to Triple–A Iowa on September 30. On October 15, Hermosillo elected to become a free agent.

=== New York Yankees ===
On December 16, 2022, Hermosillo signed a minor league contract with the New York Yankees. In 66 games for the Triple–A Scranton/Wilkes-Barre RailRiders, he batted .222/.299/.435 with 13 home runs, 35 RBI, and eight stolen bases. Hermosillo elected free agency following the season on November 6, 2023.

== Coaching career ==
On February 5, 2026, Hermosillo joined the Los Angeles Dodgers organization as an outfield and baserunning coach for their High-A affiliate, the Great Lakes Loons.
