= Tyler Payne =

American baseball player (born 1992)

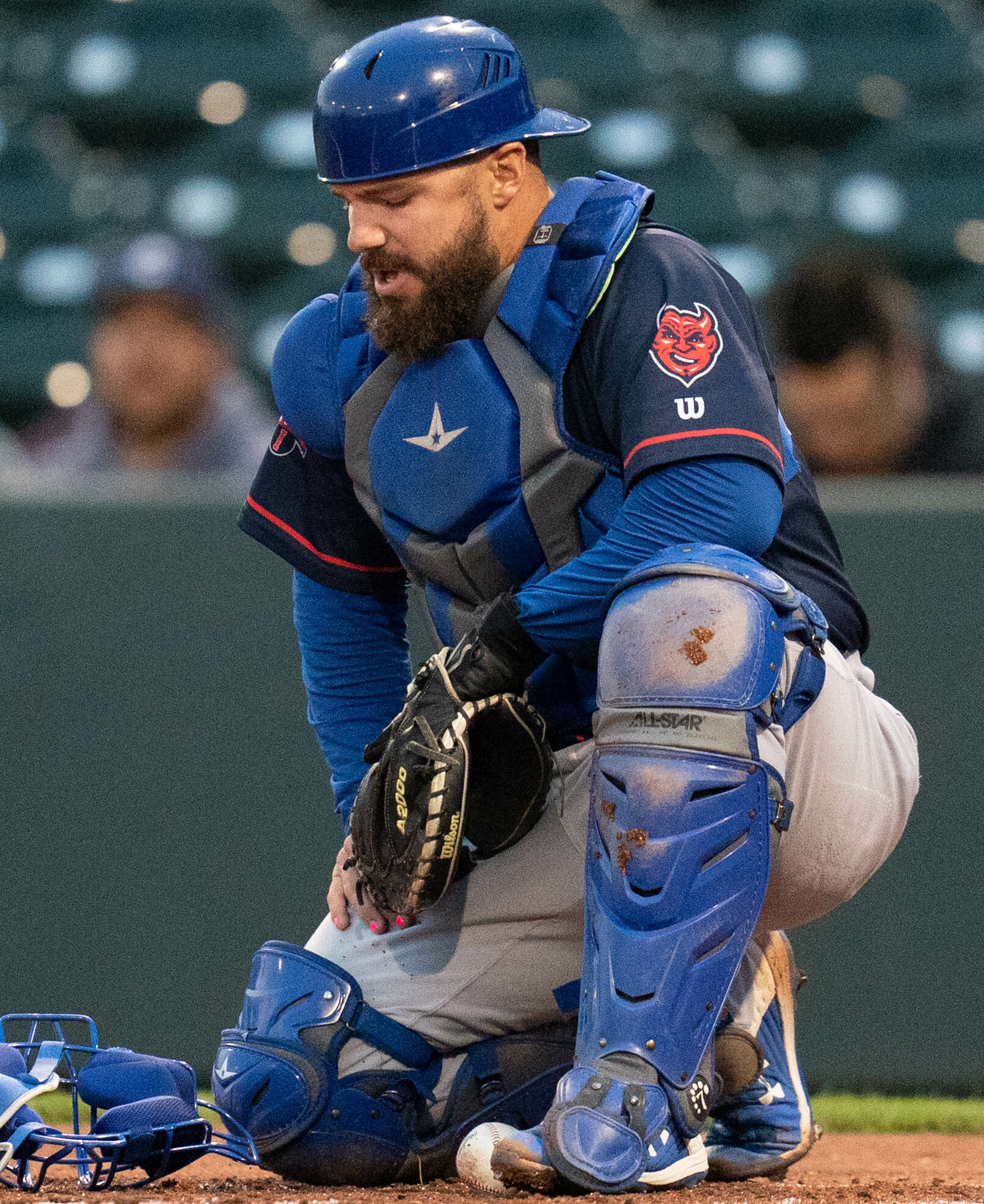
- Payne with the Iowa Cubs in 2022
- Catcher
- Born: October 25, 1992 (age 34); Hurricane, West Virginia, U.S.
- Bats: Right Throws: Right

MLB debut
- October 3, 2021, for the Chicago Cubs

MLB statistics (through 2021 season)
- Batting average: .000
- Home runs: 0
- Runs batted in: 0
- Stats at Baseball Reference

Teams
- Chicago Cubs (2021)

Anthony Tyler Payne (born October 25, 1992) is an American former professional baseball catcher. He played in Major League Baseball (MLB) for the Chicago Cubs.

== Career ==
=== Chicago Cubs ===
Payne graduated from Hurricane High School in Hurricane, West Virginia, and attended West Virginia State University, where he played college baseball for the West Virginia State Yellow Jackets. The Cubs selected Payne in the 30th round, with the 893rd overall selection, of the 2015 Major League Baseball draft.

Payne did not play in a game in 2020 due to the cancellation of the minor league season because of the COVID-19 pandemic. Payne spent the majority of the 2021 season with the Double-A Tennessee Smokies, also appearing in 1 game for the Triple-A Iowa Cubs, hitting a cumulative .231/.291/.363 with 4 home runs and 30 RBI in 60 games. On October 3, 2021, Payne was selected to the 40-man roster and promoted to the major leagues for the first time. He made his major league debut that day as a pinch hitter. He was designated for assignment by the team on October 18. On November 16, Payne re-signed with the Cubs on a minor league contract for the 2022 season.

In 2022, Payne played in 48 games for Triple–A Iowa, hitting .298/.335/.397 with one home run and 15 RBI. He elected free agency following the season on November 10, 2022.

=== Los Angeles Angels ===
On May 25, 2023, Payne signed a minor league contract with the Los Angeles Angels organization. In 44 appearances for the Double–A Rocket City Trash Pandas, he batted .313/.369/.472 with four home runs and 26 RBI.

On October 13, 2023, Payne re–signed with the Angels organization on a new minor league contract. He returned to Rocket City in 2024, playing in 73 games and batting .233/.280/.319 with four home runs, 26 RBI, and three stolen bases. Payne elected free agency following the season on November 4, 2024.
