= 2020 Chicago Cubs season =

2020 Chicago Cubs
- National League Central champions
- League: National League
- Division: Central
- Ballpark: Wrigley Field
- City: Chicago
- Record: 34–26 (.567)
- Divisional place: 1st
- Owners: Tom Ricketts
- President of baseball operations: Theo Epstein
- General managers: Jed Hoyer
- Managers: David Ross
- Television: Marquee Sports Network (Len Kasper, Jim Deshaies)
- Radio: WSCR; Chicago Cubs Radio Network (Pat Hughes, Ron Coomer, Zach Zaidman)

The 2020 Chicago Cubs season was the 149th season of the Chicago Cubs franchise, the 145th in the National League and the Cubs' 105th season at Wrigley Field. The Cubs were managed by David Ross, in his first year as Cubs manager, and played their home games at Wrigley Field as members of Major League Baseball's National League Central. The Cubs opened the season on July 24 against the Milwaukee Brewers and finished the season on the road against the Chicago White Sox.

The Cubs clinched a playoff berth on September 22, 2020, when the Philadelphia Phillies were swept in a doubleheader. This marked the Cubs' fifth playoff appearance in the previous six years. Four days later, they clinched the National League Central Division for the first time since 2017. They finished the regular season 34–26 to win the division by three games. They received the No. 3 seed in the newly expanded playoffs. However, they were swept in the NLWCS by the Miami Marlins.

The season was shortened to a 60-game schedule due to the ongoing COVID-19 pandemic. As of 2025, this is the Cubs' most recent NL Central title. This was also the last time they qualified for the postseason until 2025.

== Previous season ==
The Cubs finished the 2019 season 84–78 to finish in third place in the Central Division. The Cubs failed to make the playoffs for the first time since 2014. The season marked the final year with Joe Maddon as manager of the Cubs.

== COVID-19 effects on season ==
On March 12, 2020, MLB announced that because of the ongoing COVID-19 pandemic, the start of the regular season would be delayed by at least two weeks in addition to the remainder of spring training being cancelled. Four days later, it was announced that the start of the season would be pushed back indefinitely due to the recommendation made by the CDC to restrict events of more than 50 people for eight weeks. On June 23, commissioner Rob Manfred unilaterally implemented a 60-game season. Players reported to training camps at their home ballparks on July 1 in order to resume spring training and prepare for a July 24 Opening Day.

== Television broadcasts ==
The season marked the debut season for the team's new cable television network, the Marquee Sports Network, which debuted in February 2020. All Cubs games, except for those subject to national broadcasts (on Fox, TBS and ESPN), were aired on Marquee. Previously, Cubs games were split between NBC Sports Chicago, WGN-TV, and ABC 7. On the day of the scheduled start of the shortened season, Marquee announced an agreement with Comcast, who had more than one millions cable subscribers in the Chicago area and which represented half of the market share for the home television market, the day of the first game of the season. Marquee was only able to work out a deal with one streaming provider, Hulu, for the 2020 season. Marquee also had agreements with DirecTV, but no other providers. Following the season, Hulu dropped the network.

== Offseason ==
=== Coaching changes ===
Prior to the end of the 2019 season, the Cubs announced that Joe Maddon would not return as manager for the Cubs in 2020. On October 24, 2019, the team announced that former Cub David Ross had been hired as the team's next manager. Maddon was later named the manager of the Los Angeles Angels.

Third base coach Brian Butterfield and strength and conditioning coach Tim Buss left the Cubs to join Maddon in Anaheim. Former San Diego Padres manager Andy Green was hired as bench coach. Craig Driver was hired to coach first base with Will Veneble moving to coach third. The Cubs also added Mike Napoli (quality assurance coach) and Chris Young (bullpen coach).

=== Rule changes ===
For the 2020 season, MLB instituted several new rule changes including the following:

- Single trade deadline – there will no longer be a waiver trade deadline later in the year.
- 26-man roster – rosters will expand from 25 players, but no team may carry more than 13 pitchers.
- Three-batter minimum for pitchers - a pitcher must face three batters in a game before they can be removed unless there is an injury or the end of an inning.

Further rule changes came into effect in response to the COVID-19 pandemic including the use of the DH in the National League, a shortened schedule, and starting extra innings with a runner at second base. After the start of the season, MLB also instituted seven-inning games for doubleheaders.

=== Transactions ===
==== October 2019 ====
October 11	Signed free agents OF Gabriel Disla and RHP Edgar Mercedes to minor league contracts.
October 31	OF Nicholas Castellanos, LHP Xavier Cedeno, RHP Steve Cishek, LHP Cole Hamels, C Jonathan Lucroy, RHP Brandon Kintzler, RHP Pedro Strop, and 2B Ben Zobrist elected free agency.

==== November 2019 ====
November 2	LHP Derek Holland elected free agency
November 4	RHP Tony Barnette, RHP Kendall Graveman, RHP Brandon Morrow, and RHP David Phelps elected free agency. RHP Allen Webster sent outright to Iowa Cubs.
November 20	Selected the contracts of C Miguel Amaya, RHP Tyson Miller, RHP Colin Rea, RHP Manuel Rodriguez, and SS Zack Short.
November 23	Traded cash considerations to Oakland Athletics for RHP Jharel Cotton.
November 27	Claimed LHP CD Pelham off waivers from Texas Rangers.

==== December 2019 ====
December 2	LHP Danny Hultzen and 2B Addison Russell elected free agency.
December 6	Signed free agent RHP Dan Winkler.
December 12	Claimed RHP Trevor Megill off waivers from El Paso Chihuahuas.
December 14	Signed free agents RHP Ben Taylor, CF Ian Miller, RHP Brandon Morrow to minor league contracts and invited them to spring training.
December 15	Signed free agent RHP Caleb Simpson to a minor league contract and invited him to spring training.
December 16	Signed free agent LHP Danny Hultzen to a minor league contract and invited him to spring training.
December 18	Signed free agent LHP Rex Brothers to a minor league contract and invited him to spring training.
December 19	Signed free agent 2B Hernán Pérez to a minor league contract and invited him to spring training.
December 20	Signed free agent RHP Ryan Tepera. Signed free agent LF Noel Cuevas to a minor league contract and invited him to spring training.

==== January 2020 ====
January 13	Traded CF Tony Kemp to Oakland Athletics for 1B Alfonso Rivas.
January 17	Traded 2B Clayton Daniel to Los Angeles Dodgers for RHP Casey Sadler.
January 21	Traded future considerations to Boston Red Sox for RHP Travis Lakins.
January 24	Sent LHP CD Pelham outright to Iowa.
January 27	Selected the contract of LHP Adam Choplic from Southern Maryland Blue Crabs.
January 28	Signed free agent RF Steven Souza Jr.

==== February 2020 ====
February 1	Signed free agent RHP Jeremy Jeffress.
February 5	Invited non-roster RHP Dakota Mekkes, RHP Brock Stewart, LHP CD Pelham, 2B Trent Giambrone, C P.J. Higgins, RHP Oscar De La Cruz, and LHP Wyatt Short to spring training.

== Regular season ==
Due to the pandemic and the shortened season, Major League Baseball instituted certain rule changes which included the use of a universal designated hitter, a runner on second base to start extra innings, and a revised schedule. On July 30, the league and the union agreed that all remaining doubleheaders on the season would be seven innings. The league and players also agreed on an expanded postseason, giving eight teams in each league a playoff berth.

=== Game log ===
Due to the COVID-19 pandemic, the regular season was shortened to 60 games with teams playing 10 games against each other member of their division while also playing four games against each team in the corresponding division in the other league. The Cubs, therefore, played 10 games against each team in their division and four games against each team in the American League Central Division. On July 6, 2020, MLB announced the Cubs 60-game schedule which began on July 24 and ended on September 27.

2020 regular season game log: 34–26 (.567) (Home: 19–14; Away: 15–12)
July: 5–2 (.714) (Home: 3–1; Away: 2–1)

#	Date	Opponent	Score	Win	Loss	Save	Stadium	Record	Box/ Streak
1	July 24	Brewers	3–0	**Hendricks** (1–0)	Woodruff (0–1)	—	**Wrigley Field**	1–0	W1
2	July 25	Brewers	3–8	Suter (1–0)	**Darvish** (0–1)	—	**Wrigley Field**	1–1	L1
3	July 26	Brewers	9–1	**Chatwood** (1–0)	Peralta (0–1)	—	**Wrigley Field**	2–1	W1
4	July 27	@ Reds	8–7	**Lester** (1–0)	Miley (0–1)	**Jeffress** (1)	Great American Ball Park	3–1	W2
5	July 28	@ Reds	8–5	**Mills** (1–0)	Reed (0–1)	—	Great American Ball Park	4–1	W3
6	July 29	@ Reds	7–12	Gray (2–0)	**Hendricks** (1–1)	—	Great American Ball Park	4–2	L1
—	July 30	@ Reds	**Postponed (inclement weather)** (Makeup date: Aug 29)						
7	July 31	Pirates	6–3	**Darvish** (1–1)	Williams (0–2)	—	**Wrigley Field**	5–2	W1

August: 15–12 (.538) (Home: 8–7; Away: 7–5)

#	Date	Opponent	Score	Win	Loss	Save	Stadium	Record	Box/ Streak
8	August 1	Pirates	4–3	**Chatwood** (2–0)	Keller (1–1)	**Wick** (1)	**Wrigley Field**	6–2	W2
9	August 2	Pirates	2–1 (11)	**Jeffress** (1–0)	Ponce (0–1)	—	**Wrigley Field**	7–2	W3
10	August 3	Royals	2–0	**Mills** (2–0)	Duffy (0–2)	**Wick** (2)	**Wrigley Field**	8–2	W4
11	August 4	Royals	5–4	**Hendricks** (2–1)	Singer (0–1)	**Ryan** (1)	**Wrigley Field**	9–2	W5
12	August 5	@ Royals	6–1	**Darvish** (2–1)	Bubic (0–2)	—	Kauffman Stadium	10–2	W6
13	August 6	@ Royals	2–13	Keller (1–0)	**Chatwood** (2–1)	—	Kauffman Stadium	10–3	L1
–	August 7	@ Cardinals	**Postponed (Cardinals' COVID-19 outbreak)** (Makeup date: Aug 17)						
–	August 8	@ Cardinals	**Postponed (Cardinals' COVID-19 outbreak)** (Makeup date: Aug 19)						
–	August 9	@ Cardinals	**Postponed (Cardinals' COVID-19 outbreak)** (Makeup date: Sep 5)						
14	August 11	@ Indians	7–1	**Lester** (2–0)	Plutko (0–1)	—	Progressive Field	11–3	W1
15	August 12	@ Indians	7–2	**Hendricks** (3–1)	Carrasco (2–2)	—	Progressive Field	12–3	W2
16	August 13	Brewers	4–2	**Darvish** (3–1)	Anderson (0–2)	**Wick** (3)	**Wrigley Field**	13–3	W3
17	August 14	Brewers	3–4	Peralta (1–1)	**Mills** (2–1)	Hader (4)	**Wrigley Field**	13–4	L1
18	August 15	Brewers	5–6 (10)	Phelps (2–1)	**Jeffress** (1–1)	Claudio (1)	**Wrigley Field**	13–5	L2
19	August 16	Brewers	5–6	Yardley (1–0)	**Adam** (0–1)	Hader (5)	**Wrigley Field**	13–6	L3
20	August 17 (1)	Cardinals	1–3	Gallegos (1–0)	**Hendricks** (3–2)	Miller (2)	**Wrigley Field**	13–7	L4
21	August 17 (2)	@ Cardinals	5–4	**Underwood Jr.** (1–0)	Webb (0–1)	**Jeffress** (2)	**Wrigley Field**	14–7	W1
22	August 18	Cardinals	6–3	**Darvish** (4–1)	Ponce de Leon (0–2)	**Wick** (4)	**Wrigley Field**	15–7	W2
23	August 19 (1)	Cardinals	3–9	Webb (1–1)	**Mills** (2–2)	—	**Wrigley Field**	15–8	L1
24	August 19 (2)	@ Cardinals	4–2	**Jeffress** (2–1)	Miller (0–1)	**Kimbrel** (1)	**Wrigley Field**	16–8	W1
25	August 21	White Sox	1–10	Keuchel (4–2)	**Lester** (2–1)	—	**Wrigley Field**	16–9	L1
26	August 22	White Sox	4–7	González (1–1)	**Hendricks** (3–3)	—	**Wrigley Field**	16–10	L2
27	August 23	White Sox	2–1	**Darvish** (5–1)	Cease (4–2)	**Jeffress** (3)	**Wrigley Field**	17–10	W1
28	August 24	@ Tigers	9–3	**Mills** (3–2)	Mize (0–1)	—	Comerica Park	18–10	W2
29	August 25	@ Tigers	1–7	Turnbull (3–2)	**Chatwood** (2–2)	—	Comerica Park	18–11	L1
30	August 26	@ Tigers	6–7	Jiménez (1–1)	**Tepera** (0–1)	—	Comerica Park	18–12	L2
31	August 28	@ Reds	5–6	Mahle (1–1)	**Hendricks** (3–4)	Iglesias (4)	Great American Ball Park	18–13	L3
32	August 29	@ Reds	3–0	**Darvish** (6–1)	Bauer (3–2)	**Jeffress** (4)	Great American Ball Park	19–13	W1
33	August 29	@ Reds	5–6	Kuhnel (1–0)	**Kimbrel** (0–1)	—	Great American Ball Park	19–14	L1
34	August 30	@ Reds	10–1	**Rea** (1–0)	Castillo (0–5)	—	Great American Ball Park	20–14	W1

September: 14–12 (.538) (Home: 7–6; Away: 7–6)

#	Date	Opponent	Score	Win	Loss	Save	Stadium	Record	Box/ Streak
35	September 1	@ Pirates	8–7 (11)	**Jeffress** (3–1)	Crick (0–1)	—	PNC Park	21–14	W2
36	September 2	@ Pirates	8–2	**Hendricks** (4–4)	Musgrove (0–4)	—	PNC Park	22–14	W3
37	September 3	@ Pirates	2–6	Brubaker (1–0)	**Mills** (3–3)	—	PNC Park	22–15	L1
38	September 4	Cardinals	4–1	**Darvish** (7–1)	Flaherty (2–1)	**Jeffress** (5)	**Wrigley Field**	23–15	W1
39	September 5 (1)	Cardinals	2–4 (7)	Wainwright (4–0)	**Alzolay** (0–1)	Gallegos (3)	**Wrigley Field**	23–16	L1
40	September 5 (2)	Cardinals	1–5 (7)	Helsley (1–0)	**Rea** (1–1)	—	**Wrigley Field**	23–17	L2
41	September 6	Cardinals	3–7	Hudson (2–2)	**Lester** (2–2)	—	**Wrigley Field**	23–18	L3
42	September 7	Cardinals	5–1	**Hendricks** (5–4)	Oviedo (0–2)	—	**Wrigley Field**	24–18	W1
43	September 8	Reds	3–0	**Mills** (4–3)	Mahle (1–2)	**Jeffress** (6)	**Wrigley Field**	25–18	W2
44	September 9	Reds	0–3	Bauer (4–3)	**Darvish** (7–2)	Iglesias (6)	**Wrigley Field**	25–19	L1
45	September 10	Reds	8–5	**Ryan** (1–0)	Gray (5–3)	**Jeffress** (7)	**Wrigley Field**	26–19	W1
46	September 11	@ Brewers	0–1	Hader (1–1)	**Wick** (0–1)	—	Miller Park	26–20	L1
47	September 12	@ Brewers	4–2	**Adam** (1–1)	Hader (1–2)	**Kimbrel** (2)	Miller Park	27–20	W1
48	September 13	@ Brewers	12–0	**Mills** (5–3)	Houser (1–5)	—	Miller Park	28–20	W2
49	September 15	Indians	6–5	**Jeffress** (4–1)	Pérez (1–1)	—	**Wrigley Field**	29–20	W3
50	September 16	Indians	3–2 (10)	**Adam** (2–1)	Maton (2–2)	—	**Wrigley Field**	30–20	W4
51	September 18	Twins	1–0	**Hendricks** (6–4)	Hill (2–2)	**Jeffress** (8)	**Wrigley Field**	31–20	W5
52	September 19	Twins	1–8	Pineda (2–0)	**Mills** (5–4)	—	**Wrigley Field**	31–21	L1
53	September 20	Twins	0–4	Berríos (5–3)	**Darvish** (7–3)	—	**Wrigley Field**	31–22	L2
54	September 21	@ Pirates	5–0	**Lester** (3–2)	Brubaker (1–3)	—	PNC Park	32–22	W1
55	September 22	@ Pirates	2–3	Rodríguez (3–2)	**Chafin** (1–2)	—	PNC Park	32–23	L1
56	September 23	@ Pirates	1–2	Williams (2–8)	**Hendricks** (6–5)	Rodríguez (4)	PNC Park	32–24	L2
57	September 24	@ Pirates	0–7	Kuhl (2–3)	**Mills** (5–5)	—	PNC Park	32–25	L3
58	September 25	@ White Sox	10–0	**Darvish** (8–3)	Cease (5–4)	—	Guaranteed Rate Field	33–25	W1
59	September 26	@ White Sox	5–9	Foster (6–1)	**Lester** (3–3)	—	Guaranteed Rate Field	33–26	L1
60	September 27	@ White Sox	10–8	**Alzolay** (1–1)	López (1–3)	**Chafin** (1)	Guaranteed Rate Field	34–26	W1

Legend: = Win = Loss = Postponement
Bold = Cubs team member

=== Season standings ===
NL Central
Team	W	L	Pct.	GB	Home	Road
Chicago Cubs	34	26	.567	—	19‍–‍14	15‍–‍12
St. Louis Cardinals	30	28	.517	3	14‍–‍13	16‍–‍15
Cincinnati Reds	31	29	.517	3	16‍–‍13	15‍–‍16
Milwaukee Brewers	29	31	.483	5	15‍–‍14	14‍–‍17
Pittsburgh Pirates	19	41	.317	15	13‍–‍19	6‍–‍22

Division leaders
Team	W	L	Pct.
Los Angeles Dodgers	43	17	.717
Atlanta Braves	35	25	.583
Chicago Cubs	34	26	.567

Division 2nd place
Team	W	L	Pct.
San Diego Padres	37	23	.617
St. Louis Cardinals	30	28	.517
Miami Marlins	31	29	.517

Wild Card teams (Top 2 teams qualify for postseason)
Team	W	L	Pct.	GB
Cincinnati Reds	31	29	.517	+2
Milwaukee Brewers	29	31	.483	—
San Francisco Giants	29	31	.483	—
Philadelphia Phillies	28	32	.467	1
Washington Nationals	26	34	.433	3
New York Mets	26	34	.433	3
Colorado Rockies	26	34	.433	3
Arizona Diamondbacks	25	35	.417	4
Pittsburgh Pirates	19	41	.317	10

=== Record vs. opponents ===
2020 National League record Source: MLB Standings Grid – 2020
Team	**CHC**	**CIN**	**MIL**	**PIT**	**STL**	AL
Chicago	—	6–4	5–5	6–4	5–5	12–8
Cincinnati	4–6	—	6–4	7–3	4–6	10–10
Milwaukee	5–5	4–6	—	5–5	5–5	10–10
Pittsburgh	4–6	3–7	5–5	—	4–6	3–17
St. Louis	5–5	6–4	5–5	6–4	—	8–10

=== Opening Day starters ===
Name	Pos.
Kris Bryant	3B
Anthony Rizzo	1B
Javier Báez	SS
Kyle Schwarber	LF
Willson Contreras	C
Jason Heyward	RF
Victor Caratini	DH
Nico Hoerner	2B
Ian Happ	CF
Kyle Hendricks	SP

=== Season summary ===
==== June ====
- **June 23** – The league instituted a shortened 60-game season due to the COVID-19 pandemic. Spring training (or Summer Camp) began on July 1 with the first games to begin on July 23 and 24.

==== July ====
- **July 1** – Cubs players reported to Wrigley Field for testing ahead of summer camp and 60-game schedule.
- **July 6** – The Cubs had no players test positive for COVID-19 and are believed to be the only team in the National League without any positive tests.
- **July 13** – David Ross and five other "Tier 1 individuals" missed morning workouts due to delayed COVID-19 tests.
- **July 16** – The Cubs announced that Kyle Hendricks would be the opening day starting pitcher on July 24 against the Milwaukee Brewers, marking the first time Hendricks would make an opening day start in his career.
- **July 24** – On the latest Opening Day in MLB history, Kyle Hendricks pitched a complete-game shutout as the Cubs beat the Milwaukee Brewers 3–0 at Wrigley Field. It marked the first complete-game shutout by a Cub pitcher on opening day since 1974. Ian Happ hit a two-run homer in the third and Anthony Rizzo added a solo shot in the eighth for the Cubs in the win.
- **July 25** – In game two of the opening series against the Brewers, Yu Darvish pitched only four innings and allowed three runs. A two-run homer by Kyle Schwarber brought the Cubs within one in the fifth, but the Cub bullpen struggled surrendering five runs in four innings of work as the Cubs lost 8–3.
- **July 26** – Tyler Chatwood pitched well, giving up only one run on three hits in six innings. Meanwhile, Willson Contreras homered and drove in two runs while Ian Happ added a two-run homer and drove in three on the day. Anthony Rizzo hit a solo home run as well as the Cubs blew out the Brewers 9–1.
- **July 27** – The Cubs traveled to Cincinnati to face the Reds for a four-game series. Jon Lester pitched well, throwing five innings of a no-hit ball before being lifted after throwing 76 pitches. Meanwhile, the Cub offense continued its hot start to the season, scoring six runs in the first two innings. David Bote and Steven Souza Jr. drove in two runs apiece and Anthony Rizzo hit his third homer in four games as the Cubs took a 7–0 lead. However, the Cub bullpen continued its struggles, surrendering five runs prior to the ninth. Craig Kimbrel entered in the ninth with an 8–5 lead, but walked four and hit a batter to force in two runs while only getting one out. Jeremy Jeffress was summoned to record the final two outs of the game with the bases loaded as the Cubs held on for the 8–7 win.
- **July 28** – Javier Báez had three hits and homered twice while driving in three runs in game two of the series against the Reds. David Bote added a home run and Nico Hoerner drove in two runs as the Cubs beat the Reds 8–5. Alec Mills pitched well, allowing only two runs on two hits in six innings. The Cub bullpen did surrender three runs as it continued to struggle, but it was not enough for the Reds. The win moved the Cubs into sole possession of first place early in the season.
- **July 29** – Kyle Hendricks could not duplicate his opening day start, giving up six runs in 4.1 innings of work as the Cubs fell behind 7–0. The Cub bullpen continued to struggle, preventing any chance at a comeback by surrendering a grand slam and giving up six runs in 3.2 innings. Kris Bryant drove in two runs and David Bote hit a two-run homer, but it was not enough as the Cubs were routed 12–7. The Cubs did turn a triple play in the eighth inning when Bryant caught a line drive, stepped on third, and threw to first with the bases loaded in the eighth. Replays showed that the ball likely hit the ground before Bryant caught it.
- **July 30** – The league and the union announced that any remaining doubleheaders would be seven-inning games.
- **July 31** – After a rainout of the final game of the Reds' series, the Cubs returned home to face the Pittsburgh Pirates. Jason Heyward and Anthony Rizzo drove in two runs each and Jason Kipnis homered to give the Cubs a 6–1 lead. Yu Darvish pitched six scoreless innings while the Cub bullpen, especially Craig Kimbrel, struggled again. In the ninth, Kimbrel gave up two solo home runs to narrow the lead to 6–3, but was able to get the final three outs as the Cubs won 6–3.

==== August ====
- **August 1** – In game two versus the Pirates, Tyler Chatwood pitched 6.2 innings of scoreless baseball. Jeremy Jeffress relieved and pitched 1.1 innings of perfect relief. Meanwhile, Javier Báez and Ian Happ hit solo home runs while Kyle Schwarber added a two-run homer in the eighth to extend the Cub lead 4–0. In the ninth, Kyle Ryan surrendered three runs to bring the Pirates within one run, but Rowan Wick got the final two outs to hold on for the 4–3 win.
- **August 2** – Jon Lester allowed a first inning home run, but settled in after that, holding the Pirates scoreless for five more innings. The Cubs tied it in the fifth on a double by Kyle Schwarber while the Cub bullpen pitched well, holding the Pirates scoreless. After a rain delay, the game went to extra innings with the new rules for the first time on the season for the Cubs. In the 11th, Anthony Rizzo moved the runner to third with a fly to left and Javier Báez singled to plate the winning run. The 2–1 win moved the Cubs' record to 7–2 on the season with the sweep of the Pirates.
- **August 3** – With the Kansas City Royals visiting Chicago, Alec Mills pitched seven shutout innings while Javier Báez drove in a run on a sacrifice fly and Kris Bryant, returning to the lineup after missing the prior two games, hit his first homer of the season. That was all the Cubs would need as Rowan Wick notched a four-out save to blank the Royals 2–0.
- **August 4** – Kyle Hendricks pitched seven innings while scattering seven hits and allowing only two runs against the Royals. Jason Heyward hit his first home run of the year, a two-run home run in the second inning. Jason Kipnis also hit a two-run homer in the fourth while Willson Contreras added a solo home run in the eighth. With a 5–2 lead in the ninth, manager David Ross gave Craig Kimbrel another chance, but he allowed two runs while only getting one out. Kyle Ryan was brought in after Kimbrel faced the minimum of three batters to get the final two outs as the Cubs held on for a 5–4 win. The win moved the Cubs to 9–2 on the season and four games ahead of the Reds in the Central Division.
- **August 5** – Yu Darvish continued the Cubs' strong starting pitching performances as the series with the Royals switched to Kansas City, pitching seven innings and allowing only one run. Javier Báez drove in two runs and the Cub offense added four runs in the last two innings to pull away for the 6–1 win, the Cubs' sixth straight. The win pushed the Cubs to a 10–2 start, only the fourth time the team had won at least 10 of their first 12 games to start a season since 1901.
- **August 6** – Tyler Chatwood struggled, allowing eight runs in 2.1 innings of work. The Cub bullpen also struggled, surrendering five runs. The Cub offense mustered only two runs in the ninth as the Cubs were blown out by the Royals, 13–2.
- **August 7** – The Cubs next traveled to St. Louis to face the Cardinals. The Cardinals, due to positive COVID-19 tests while in Milwaukee, had not played since July 30. Due to further positive COVID-19 tests of Cardinals players, the series scheduled for August 7 through August 9 was postponed.
- **August 11** – Returning to play after the cancellation of the series against the Cardinals, the Cubs traveled to Cleveland to face the Indians. Jason Heyward homered and drove in four runs as the Cubs routed the Indians. Ian Happ drove in two runs while Jon Lester pitched six strong innings and allowed only one run. The Cub bullpen pitched three scoreless innings as the Cubs won 7–1 moving their record to 11–3 on the season.
- **August 12** – Kyle Hendricks allowed one run in six innings while Anthony Rizzo and Kris Bryant each homered as the Cubs swept the Indians, winning 7–2. David Bote and Jason Heyward drove in two runs each in the win while the Cub bullpen surrendered only one run. The win moved the Cubs 5.5 games into first place in the division and matched their best start since 1970.
- **August 13** – The Cubs returned home to face the Brewers for a four-game series. Yu Darvish pitched six hitless innings before giving up a home run in the seventh. Kyle Schwarber homered for the Cubs as the Cubs led throughout. Rowan Wick allowed a ninth-inning run before getting the final out and earning his third save on the season as the Cubs won 4–2. The win moved the Cubs to an MLB-best record of 13–3 and equaled the franchise's best start since 1907.
- **August 14** – Tyler Chatwood was scratched with back tightness, so Alec Mills made the start and pitched well, giving up one run through five innings as the Cubs took a 3–1 lead. However, in the sixth, Christian Yelich hit a three-run homer to give the Brewers a 4–3 lead. The Cubs could manage nothing further and lost 4–3, dropping the Cubs' record to 13–4 on the season.
- **August 15** – The Cubs jumped out to an early 3–0 lead on a solo home run by Anthony Rizzo in the first and a Rizzo RBI double in the second. Colin Rea made the start for the Cubs and pitched into the fourth, allowing three runs. Casey Sadler gave up the lead in the sixth, but Steven Souza Jr. homered to tie it in the eighth. In the 10th, Jeremy Jeffress allowed the runner from second to score and gave up another run. The Cubs could only score one in the bottom of the 10th and the Cubs fell 5–4. The loss marked the first time on the season the Cubs had lost back-to-back games.
- **August 16** – Jon Lester allowed five runs on nine hits in six innings, but left with the game tied at five on the strength of a Jason Kipnis two-run scoring single in the sixth. However, in the seventh, Jason Adam, making his Cub debut surrendered a Ryan Braun RBI single to put the Cubs behind 6–5. The Cubs could not push across another run, losing their third straight to the Brewers 6–5 and falling to 13–6 on the season.
- **August 17** – In game one of a doubleheader against the Cardinals at Wrigley Field, Kyle Hendricks allowed three runs in 6.1 innings of work. However, the Cubs could only manage a solo home run by Ian Happ and the Cubs lost 3–1 in seven innings pursuant to the new doubleheader rules. The loss marked the fourth straight for the Cubs. In game two of the doubleheader, the Cubs, as the visitors, were held without a hit into the sixth, but managed a run in the first inning. Trailing 4–1 in the sixth, Willson Contreras doubled to score Javier Báez to move within two. David Bote then hit a pinch-hit three-run homer to give the Cubs a 5–4 lead. Jeremy Jeffress pitched a scoreless seventh as the Cubs ended their five-game losing streak, winning 5–4.
- **August 18** – Yu Darvish pitched six innings and scattered eight hits while allowing just one run. Ian Happ homered in the third and Kyle Schwarber hit a two-run homer in the fifth to give the Cubs a 4–1 lead. The Cubs held on from there with Rowan Wick notching a four-out save, beating the Cardinals 6–3.
- **August 19** – In their second doubleheader in three days, the Cubs fell behind the Cardinals early as Alec Mills allowed a first inning grand slam to Matt Carpenter. Ian Happ hit his fifth homer in the first, but the Cubs could manage no further runs until the seventh despite leaving seven runners on base. Mills lasted 3.2 innings and gave up six runs as the Cubs lost 9–3. In the second game of the twin bill, Adbert Alzolay pitched six innings and allowed only one unearned run. On the strength of Victor Caratini's two-run scoring single, Alzolay left the game with a 2–1 lead. However, Jeremy Jeffress allowed the tying run in the sixth, sending the Cubs, as the visitors, to the seventh and final inning tied. In the seventh, David Bote singled with the bases loaded to score two and give the Cubs a 4–2 lead. With Rowan Wick having pitched 1.1 innings the night before, David Ross went to Craig Kimbrel for the save. Kimbrel struck out the side to earn his first save of the year as the Cubs beat the Cardinals 4–2 and move to 16–8 on season.
- **August 21** – After an off-day, the Cubs welcomed the Chicago White Sox to Wrigley. Jon Lester was too welcoming however, surrendering eight runs on nine hits in 3.2 innings of work. The White Sox pounded out six home runs and 10 runs, blowing out the Cubs 10–1.
- **August 22** – The White Sox continued to pound Cub pitching in game two of the series though Kyle Hendricks allowed only three runs in 5.1 innings of work. José Abreu hit three of the Sox five home runs in the game as the Sox won again 7–4.
- **August 23** – Looking to avoid the sweep, the Yu Darvish pitched seven innings and allowed only one run. However, the Cubs offense continued to struggle as they trailed 1–0 going in to the sixth. A two-run home run by Kyle Schwarber in the sixth gave the Cubs a 2–1 lead. Jeremy Jeffress walked a tight rope looking for a four-out save and loaded the bases in the ninth, but induced a ground out to end the game. The 2–1 win moved the Cubs to 17–10 on the season, three games ahead of the Cardinals in the division.
- **August 24** – David Bote homered and drove in four while Javier Báez hit two home runs and drove in three as the Cubs beat the Detroit Tigers 9–3 in Detroit. Alec Mills pitched seven innings and allowed three runs to earn the win while the Cub bullpen pitched two scoreless innings. The win marked the 11,000th victory in team history. The Cubs are the second team, after the Giants, to reach this milestone.
- **August 25** – Tyler Chatwood struggled in his return from the injured list, lasting only 1.1 innings, walking five batters, and giving up two runs. José Quintana also returned from the injured list and took over in the third. After being chased in the sixth, Casey Sadler allowed a grand slam, charging three runs to Quintana as the Cubs were routed 7–1. The loss dropped the Cubs to 18–11 on the season.
- **August 26** – Jon Lester pitched well, surrendering only one run in five innings. The Cub bullpen, however, allowed five runs in the sixth and another in the seventh, putting the Cubs down 7–3. The Cubs rallied in the ninth, scoring three, but Javier Báez and Kyle Schwarber flied out to end the game as the Cubs lost 7–6. Jason Heyward chose to sit out the game in the aftermath of the Jacob Blake shooting.
- **August 28** – After an off day, the Cubs took an early 2–0 lead on homers by Anthony Rizzo and Kyle Schwarber. Kyle Hendricks however surrendered five runs in six innings as the Cubs trailed the Reds 6–2 in Cincinnati entering the ninth. Willson Contreras hit a two-run homer in the top of the ninth and Jason Heyward followed with a solo homer to bring the Cubs within one. However, the Cubs could manage no more, losing 6–5.
- **August 29** – In a doubleheader against the Reds, Yu Darvish pitched six scoreless innings as the Cubs beat the Reds 3–0. Anthony Rizzo hit two home runs in the game and Jason Heyward drove in a run in the win. In the second game, the Cubs trailed 4–1 after three innings. David Bote hit a two-run homer in the fourth and Ian Happ tied it with an RBI double in the fifth. Nico Hoerner drove in the go-ahead run in the sixth on a sacrifice fly, but the Cubs could manage no further. In the seventh, the Cubs turned to Craig Kimbrel to lock down the save. However, Kimbrel walked three and gave up the game-tying single. Kimbrel then threw his third wild pitch of the inning to give the Reds the walk-off 6–5 win. The loss dropped the Cubs record to 19–14 in the season.
- **August 30** – Ian Happ, Jason Heyward, and Kyle Schwarber each hit two home runs in the game marking the first time in MLB history to have three starting outfielders hit multiple home runs in the same game. Schwarber's last home run was a grand slam in the ninth as the Cubs routed the Reds 10–1. Tyler Chatwood got the start, but left with elbow pain in the third. The Cub bullpen, led by José Quintana's three innings, allowed only one run in 6.2 innings of relief. The win moved the Cubs to 20–14 on the season.

==== September ====
- **September 1** – After an off day, the Cubs traveled to face the Pirates and jumped to an early 6–1 lead in the fifth on an Ian Happ lead-off homer, RBIs by Jason Kipnis and Javier Báez, and a two-run homer by Kyle Schwarber. Jon Lester could not keep the lead, however, surrendering four runs in the sixth to tighten the score at 6–5. Following a rain delay prior to the bottom of the eighth, Pirates' third baseman Ke'Bryan Hayes, who was making his Major League debut, homered to tie the game. Going to extras, both teams scored with a runner starting at second in the 10th, the Cubs on Jason Heyward sacrifice fly and the Pirates on a fielder's choice. In the 11th, Happ singled to start the inning and score Kipnis from second. Meanwhile, Jeremy Jeffress who got the final outs in the 10th, walked a batter, but prevented the runner from scoring in the bottom of the 11th as the Cubs won 8–7.
- **September 2** – Kyle Hendricks pitched six innings while allowing only one run in game two of the series against the Pirates. Javier Báez hit a three-run homer in the fourth while Anthony Rizzo drove in two runs and plated two more when reaching on an error in the eighth as the Cubs pulled away for an easy 8–2 win. The win moved the Cubs to 22–14 on the season with 24 games remaining.
- **September 3** – Alec Mills pitched five innings while allowing four runs and the Cub bullpen surrendered two unearned runs putting the Cubs behind 6–2. The Cubs left nine men on base and were unable to score any further runs, losing to the Pirates 6–2. Ian Happ left the game after fouling a ball off his face, but x-rays were negative.
- **September 4** – The Cubs returned home for a five-game series against the Cardinals. Yu Darvish pitched well, allowing only one run in seven innings while striking out 11 batters. He lowered his league-leading ERA to 1.44 on the season. Meanwhile, Willson Contreras went 3–4, homering and driving in all four Cubs runs in the 4–1 Cub victory. The win pushed the Cubs 4.5 games into first place in the division.
- **September 5** – The Cubs took an early one-run lead in game of the Saturday doubleheader on Ian Happ home run in his return to the lineup. Happ homered again in the fifth, but the Cub offense could not score any further. Adbert Alzolay surrendered two runs on two hits in 2.2 innings, but walked five. Ryan Tepera also surrendered two runs in relief as the Cubs lost game one 4–2. In game two as the visitors, the Cub offense continued to struggle, managing only one run. Colin Rea got the start and gave up four runs in two innings as the Cubs lost 5–1. The loss dropped the Cubs to 23–17 on the season.
- **September 6** – Playing on Sunday Night Baseball, Jon Lester was shelled, giving up five runs in 3.1 innings. The Cub offense managed three runs on an Anthony Rizzo homer and a Jason Kipnis two-run homer, but it was not enough as the Cubs lost their third straight game to the Cardinals, 7–3.
- **September 7** – In the final game of the season against the Cardinals, Kyle Hendricks pitched eight innings while allowing only one run. Anthony Rizzo drove in a run grounding into a double play in the first and drove in another in the third on a sacrifice fly. Jason Kipnis and Willson Contreras added run-scoring hits as the Cubs won 5–1.
- **September 8** – With the wind blowing in at Wrigley, David Bote drove in two runs with a triple and Javier Báez also tripled to score a run as the Cubs took a 3–0 lead on the Reds. Alec Mills pitched six scoreless innings and the Cub bullpen followed suit as the Cubs won 3–0. The win moved the Cubs to 25–18 on the season and extended their division lead to three games over the Cardinals.
- **September 9** – Yu Darvish walked consecutive Red batters in the first inning and gave up a three-run home run to Mike Moustakas. He settled down after that, allowing no further runs, but the Cubs offense was shutout by Trevor Bauer. The 3–0 loss left the Cubs only 2.5 games ahead of the Cardinals in the division.
- **September 10** – Following a 75-minute rain delay, Adbert Alzolay gave up three runs in 3.2 innings and left trailing 3–0. However, the Cub offense finally broke through, scoring five runs in the fourth as Nico Hoerner drove in two on a double while Ian Happ drove in two on an infield single. Hoerner drove in another run in the fifth and Cameron Maybin drove in his first run as a Cub as the Cubs pulled away for the 8–5 win. The win moved the Cubs back to three games ahead of the Cardinals in the division with 15 games remaining in the season.
- **September 11** – The Cubs traveled to Milwaukee to face the Brewers, but the Cub offense continued its struggles, failing to score through nine innings. Jon Lester recovered from his prior poor start, allowing three runs in six innings of work. The Cub bullpen also held the Brewers scoreless through eight innings. However, in the ninth, Ryan Braun hit a sacrifice fly to give the Brewers the 1–0 win. The loss dropped the Cubs to 26–20 on the season.
- **September 12** – The Cub offense continued to struggle, falling behind 2–0 behind Kyle Hendricks' strong 7.2 innings of work. Entering the ninth without scoring in 17 straight innings against the Brewers, Javier Báez and Anthony Rizzo singled off Josh Hader before Jason Heyward hit a three-run home run to give the Cubs the 3–2 lead. Ildemaro Vargas followed with a solo home run to push the lead to two. Craig Kimbrel allowed consecutive singles to start the bottom of the ninth, but rallied to get the next three batters to give the Cubs the 4–2 win.
- **September 13** – Alec Mills threw a no-hitter in the final game of the series against the Brewers, striking out five and walking three in the 12–0 win. David Bote hit a three-run homer and Victor Caratini also drove in three as the Cubs won easily. The no-hitter was the 16th in Cub history and the first since Jake Arrieta in 2016. The win moved the Cubs to 28–20 on the season.
- **September 15** – After an off day, the Cubs returned home to face Cleveland. Javier Báez gave the Cubs an early 1–0 lead on a second inning home run. Yu Darvish quickly surrendered the lead, giving up three runs through five innings. In the fifth, Kris Bryant singled to score a run and Anthony Rizzo followed with a double to score Bryant and tie the game. In the seventh, Willson Contreras gave the Cubs the lead with a sacrifice fly. Báez the stole second and came all the way around to score as the throw to second went into the outfield. With a 5–3 lead in the ninth, Jeremy Jeffress surrendered a two-run home run to Francisco Lindor to blow the save. In the bottom of the ninth, Bryant walked and Rizzo singled to put runners on the corners. Contreras was then hit by a pitch to load the bases with one out. Pinch-hitter Cameron Maybin was hit on the first pitch he saw to force in the winning run as the Cubs won 6–5.
- **September 16** – The Cubs took an early 2–0 lead against Cleveland in the final game of the series on RBI singles by Jason Heyward and Cameron Maybin. Jon Lester, pitching in perhaps his final game at Wrigley Field, allowed two runs in five innings to surrender the lead. The game remained tied into the 10th before Kris Bryant singled and Anthony Rizzo was intentionally walked loading the bases. Willson Contreras and Kyle Schwarber each struck out before Javier Báez singled to score the winning run with two outs. The win moved the Cubs' record to 30–20 on the season, the first time they were 10 games over .500 since they were 13–3 to start the season.
- **September 18** – After an off day, the Cubs welcomed the Minnesota Twins to Wrigley Field. Kyle Hendricks pitched eight shutout innings and struck out 10 while the Cubs scored a first inning run on a Willson Contreras single. That was all the Cubs would need as Jeremy Jeffress pitched a shaky ninth, but earned the save as the Cubs won 1–0 moving them to a season-high 11 games over .500.
- **September 19** – Alec Mills gave up four runs in six innings of work while the Cub bullpen surrendered an additional four runs as the Cubs were blown out 8–1. The Cubs sole run came on an RBI double in the second by David Bote. The loss dropped the Cubs' record to 31–21 on the season.
- **September 20** – In the final home game of the season, the Cub offense continued to struggle, failing to score a run. Yu Darvish surrendered four runs in six innings of work, but Nico Hoerner had a chance to tie the game with the bases loaded in the bottom of the ninth. Hoerner struck out, however, as the Cubs lost again, this time 4–0. Kyle Schwarber was removed from the game by Cubs manager David Ross after appearing to not give full effort on a line drive that turned into a triple in the third inning. The loss reduced the Cubs' division lead to 3.5 games over the Cardinals.
- **September 21** – The Cubs traveled to Pittsburgh to face the Pirates with seven games remaining in the season. Jon Lester pitched six shutout innings and Kyle Schwarber bounced back from being benched in the prior game to double twice and drive in two runs. Javier Báez drove in a run with a bunt single while David Bote and Victor Caratini each drove in a run to give the Cubs the easy 5–0 win. The win reduced the Cubs magic number to win the division to four with six games remaining. Kris Bryant left the game after injuring his oblique on a swing and miss.
- **September 22** – José Quintana returned from the IL to make the start and allowed one run in two innings of work. Adbert Alzolay pitched four innings and also surrendered a run as the Cubs fell behind to the Pirates 2–0. Anthony Rizzo tied it in the eighth with a two-run home run, his first home run on the year with a runner on base. However, Andrew Chafin surrendered a walk-off home run to Jacob Stallings in the bottom of the ninth as the Cubs lost 3–2. The Cubs did clinch a playoff spot with the Phillies losing both games of a doubleheader earlier in the evening, marking their fifth playoff appearance in the last six years. The Cubs magic number for the division remained at four with the Cardinals winning and narrowing the division lead to 3.5 games.
- **September 23** – Anthony Rizzo homered to lead off the game, but Kyle Hendricks surrendered back-to-back homers to the first two Pirate batters to give the Pirates a 2–1 lead. The Cub offense continued to struggle and could push no other runs across as the Cubs lost 2–1. The loss moved the Cubs to 32–24 on the season. However, a Cardinals loss that night moved the Cubs' magic number to three to clinch the division.
- **September 24** – Alec Mills struggled in his second start since throwing a no-hitter, giving up four runs and eight hits in 3.2 innings of work. The Cub bullpen also struggled, surrendering three runs to the Pirates at the Cubs fell behind 7–0. The Cub offense continued to struggle, managing only two hits and failing to score as the Cubs lost their fifth game of their previous six, but retained a magic number of three to win the division.
- **September 25** - The Cubs' offense finally woke up as they returned to Chicago to face the White Sox for the final series of the season. Willson Contreras hit two home runs, the first in the third inning with two on. Contreras, in celebration, launched a massive bat flip on his way to third base which angered the White Sox. Kyle Schwarber and Javier Báez hit solo home runs while Victor Caratini hit his first home run of the season, a two-run shot, to give the Cubs a 7–0 lead. In the seventh, Contreras was hit by a pitch which appeared intentional and led to the ejection of the pitcher, Jimmy Cordero, and Sox manager Rick Renteria as well as pitching coach Don Cooper. The Cubs pushed the lead to 10–0 when Contreras hit his second homer in the ninth off White Sox second baseman Yolmer Sánchez. The Cub win and a Cardinal loss reduced the Cubs' magic number down to one for the division.
- **September 26** – Kris Bryant, who had missed several games due to an injury, returned to the lineup and singled in his first at-bat. Trailing 2–1 in the third, Bryant hit his first home run since August 12, a grand slam that gave the Cubs a 5–2 lead. However, Jon Lester surrendered five more runs, seven in total as the Cubs lost 9–5. Despite the loss, a Cardinal loss to the Brewers clinched the division for the Cubs, the first division win since 2017.
- **September 27** – On the final day of the regular season, the Cubs, who were locked in to the three seed in the NL playoffs, sat regulars Anthony Rizzo, Willson Contreras, and Jason Heyward for rest prior to the playoffs. Despite this, the Cubs jumped to an early lead on another Kris Bryant home run, a two-run home run by David Bote, and a two-run scoring single by Cameron Maybin. A Billy Hamilton steal of home capped a six-run second inning for the Cubs. Hamilton hit his first home run as a Cub in the fourth and the Cubs pushed the lead to 10–1 in the seventh on a single by Javier Báez. The Sox made a run late, narrowing the lead to 10–8 in the bottom of the ninth, but the Cubs held on for the win.

=== Transactions ===
==== June ====
June 22	Signed SS Ed Howard.
June 25	Signed RHP Koen Moreno, LHP Luke Little, and LHP Burl Carraway.
June 26	Signed 1B Matt Mervis, OF Jacob Wetzel, 2B Scott McKeon, and OF Bradlee Beesley to minor league contracts.
June 28	Changed roster status of RF Mark Zagunis, CF Brennen Davis, and 3B Christopher Morel. Invited RHP Juan Gamez and LHP Brailyn Marquez to spring training.
June 30	Signed RHP Graham Lawson and RHP Bailey Reid to minor league contracts.

==== July ====
July 4	Signed RHP Sam Thoresen to a minor league contract.
July 7	Invited 2B Hernán Pérez to spring training.
July 14	Signed free agent C Jose Lobaton to a minor league contract and invited him to spring training. Invited non-roster LHP Jack Patterson and RHP Keegan Thompson to spring training.
July 15	Invited non-roster RHP Cory Abbott to spring training
July 17	Selected the contract of 2B Jason Kipnis from Iowa Cubs. Sent RHP Trevor Megill outright to Alternate Training Site.
July 21	Signed free agents RHP Ben Leeper and RHP Sheldon Reed to minor league contracts.
July 22	Signed OF Jordan Nwogu.
July 23	Placed LHP Jose Quintana (left thumb) on the 10-day injured list retroactive to July 20, 2020. Placed 2B Daniel Descalso (ankle) on the 60-day injured list. Placed RF Mark Zagunis on the restricted list. Designated 2B Robel Garcia for assignment. Optioned RHP Jharel Cotton and RHP Ryan Tepera to Cubs Alternate Training Site. Selected the contract of C Josh Phegley and LHP Rex Brothers from Alternate Training Site. Recalled RHP Dillon Maples and RHP James Norwood from Alternate Training Site.
July 26	Placed LHP Brad Wieck (hamstring) on 10-day IL. Recalled RHP Ryan Tepera from Alternate Training Site.
July 30	Recalled RHP Colin Rea from Alternative Training Site. Optioned RHP Dillon Maples to Alternate Training Site.
July 31	Signed free agent RHP Cody Allen to a minor league contract and invited him to spring training.

==== August ====
August 2	Placed RHP James Norwood on 10-day IL. Recalled LHP Justin Steele from Alternate Training Site.
August 6	Optioned LHP Rex Brothers and LHP Justin Steele to Alternate Training Site. Signed free agent RHP Kelvin Herrera to a minor league contract and invited him to spring training. Selected the contract of LHP Matt Dermody from Sugar Land Skeeters.
August 8	Released 2B Derek Dietrich
August 15	Placed RHP Tyler Chatwood (back) on 10-day IL retroactive to August 13. Selected the contract of RHP Jason Adam from Alternate Training Site. Designated RHP Jharel Cotton for assignment.
August 17	Recalled RHP Tyson Miller from Alternate Training Site as 29th roster member for doubleheader.
August 18	Placed RF Steven Souza Jr. (hamstring) on the 10-day IL retroactive to August 17. Transferred LHP Brad Wieck from the 10-day IL to the 60-day IL. Optioned RHP Tyson Miller to Alternate Training Site. Selected the contract of 2B Hernán Pérez from Alternate Training Site.
August 19	Recalled RHP Adbert Alzolay from Alternate Training Site as 29th roster member for doubleheader.
August 20	Optioned RHP Adbert Alzolay to Alternate Training Site. Sent Jharel Cotton outright to Alternate Training Site.
August 22	Placed 3B Kris Bryant (finger) on 10-day IL retroactive to August 19.
August 23	Selected the contract of OF Ian Miller from Alternate Training Site. Transferred RHP James Norwood from the 10-day IL to the 60-day IL. Signed free agent 1B Patrick Wisdom to a minor league contract and invited him to spring training.
August 25	Activated RHP Tyler Chatwood and LHP Jose Quintana from 10-day IL. Optioned RHP Jason Adam and OF Ian Miller to Alternate Training Site.
August 26	Released RHP Kelvin Herrera.
August 29	Recalled RHP Adbert Alzolay for the 26th man for doubleheader.
August 30	Optioned RHP Adbert Alzolay to Alternate Training Stie. Designated C Josh Phegley for assignment. Traded player to be named later and cash to Tampa Bay Rays for 1B José Martinez.
August 31	Designated OF Ian Miller and 2B Hernán Pérez for assignment. Traded a player to be named later to Boston Red Sox for LHP Josh Osich. Traded a player to be named later to Arizona Diamondbacks for LHP Andrew Chafin and cash. Traded SS Zack Short to Detroit Tigers for OF Cameron Maybin.

==== September ====
September 1	Activated 3B Kris Bryant and OF Steven Souza Jr. from the IL. Activated 1B José Martínez, OF Cameron Maybin, and LHP Josh Osich. Placed RHP Tyler Chatwood (forearm) on the 10-day IL. Optioned Albert Almora Jr. to Alternate Training Site. Designated RHP Casey Sadler for assignment.
September 2	Placed LHP José Quintana (left lat) on 10-day IL retroactive to August 31. Recalled RHP Jason Adam from Alternate Training Site. Sent 2B Hernán Pérez outright to Alternate Training Site.
September 3	Sent C Josh Phegley and OF Ian Miller outright to Alternate Training Site. Released RHP Cody Allen.
September 5	Released RHP Jharel Cotton. Recalled RHP Adbert Alzolay and RHP Tyson Miller from Alternate Training Site. Signed free agent RHP Pedro Strop to a minor league contract and invited him to spring training. Claimed 2B Ildemaro Vargas off waivers from Minnesota Twins.
September 6	Selected the contract of LHP Matt Dermody from Alternate Training Site. Optioned RHP Adbert Alzolay and RHP Tyson Miller to Alternate Training Site. Designated OF Steven Souza Jr. for assignment.
September 7	Recalled 2B Ildemaro Vargas from Alternate Training Site. Claimed OF Billy Hamilton off waivers from New York Mets. Released C Jose Lobaton. Optioned LHP Matt Dermody to Alternate Training Site. Invited non-roster RHP Duncan Robinson to spring training.
September 8	Activated OF Billy Hamilton. Optioned 1B José Martinez to alternate training site. Released OF Steven Souza Jr.
September 9	Released RHP Juan Gamez. Sent LHP Matt Dermody outright to Alternate Training Site.
September 10	Recalled RHP Adbert Alzolay to Alternate Training Site. Option ed RHP Colin Rea to Alternate Training Site. Traded SS Pedro Martinez to Rays to complete earlier trade. Released OF Ryan LaMarre. Signed free agent RHP Joe Wieland to minor league contract and invited him to spring training.
September 11	Recalled LHP Rex Brothers from Alternate Training Site. Optioned RHP Adbert Alzolay to Alternate Training Site.
September 19	Activated LHP Andrew Chafin from 10-day IL. Placed RHP Rowan Wick (oblique) on 10-day IL.
September 20	Recalled 1B José Martinez from Alternate Training Stie. Optioned LHP to Alternate Training Site.
September 21	Placed 2B Ildemaro Vargas (hamstring) on 10-day IL retroactive to September 20. Recalled RHP Adbert Alzolay from Alternate Training Site.
September 22	Activated LHP José Quintana from the 10-day IL. Optioned LHP Rex Brothers to Alternate Training Site.
September 25	Selected the contract of 1B Patrick Wisdom from Alternate Training Site. Optioned 1B Jose Martinez to Alternate Training Site. Placed RHP Manny Rodriguez on the 45-day IL.
September 27	Selected the contract of LHP Brailyn Marquez from Alternate Training Site. Designated 1B Patrick Wisdom for assignment.
September 28	Sent 1B Patrick Wisdom outright to Cubs Alternate Training Site. Activated RHP Tyler Chatwood and RHP Rowan Wick from the 10-day injured list. LHP Matt Dermody elected free agency. Recalled RHP Tyson Miller, RHP Dillon Maples, LHP Justin Steele, LHP Matt Dermody, C Miguel Amaya, OF Albert Almora Jr., and RHP Colin Rea from Cubs Alternate Training Site.
September 30	Designated LHP Josh Osich for assignment. Reassigned LHP Justin Steele, RHP Colin Rea, and RHP Dillon Maples, RHP Tyler Chatwood, RHP Rowan Wick, OF Albert Almora Jr., LHP Brailyn Marquezand C Miguel Amaya to the minors. Selected the contract of C Josh Phegley from Cubs Alternate Training Site. Invited non-roster 1B Patrick Wisdom to spring training. Activated 2B Ildemaro Vargas from the 10-day IL.

=== Regular season roster ===
Due to the COVID-19 pandemic and the resulting proposed shortened season, teams started the season with a 30-man roster. The rosters reduced to 28 after two weeks and then were to return to the new-normal roster size of 26 after that. It was decided later to keep rosters at 28 for the remainder of the season.
(Contains all players who played in a game for the Cubs during the 2020 season.)

2020 Chicago Cubs
**Roster**
**Pitchers**: 60 Jason Adam; 73 Adbert Alzolay; 39 Andrew Chafin; 32 Tyler Chatwood; 11 Yu Darvish; 45 Matt Dermody; 28 Kyle Hendricks; 24 Jeremy Jeffress; 46 Craig Kimbrel; 34 Jon Lester; 36 Dillon Maples; 61 Brailyn Márquez; 72 Tyson Miller; 30 Alec Mills; 57 James Norwood; 35 Josh Osich; 62 José Quintana; 20 Colin Rea; 56 Kyle Ryan; 65 Casey Sadler; 52 Ryan Tepera; 51 Duane Underwood Jr.; 50 Rowan Wick; 38 Brad Wieck; 43 Dan Winkler	**Catchers**: 7 Víctor Caratini; 40 Willson Contreras; 4 Josh Phegley; **Infielders**: 9 Javier Báez; 13 David Bote; 17 Kris Bryant; 2 Nico Hoerner; 27 Jason Kipnis; 53 José Martínez; 44 Anthony Rizzo; 41 Hernán Pérez; 16 Ildemaro Vargas; 59 Patrick Wisdom	**Outfielders**: 5 Albert Almora Jr.; 6 Billy Hamilton; 8 Ian Happ; 22 Jason Heyward; 15 Cameron Maybin; 6 Ian Miller; 12 Kyle Schwarber; 21 Steven Souza Jr.	**Manager**: 3 David Ross; **Coaches**: 58 Mike Borzello (associate pitching/catching/strategy); 63 Juan Cabreja (staff assistant); 81 Craig Driver (first base/catching); 91 Kyle Evans (Major League data and development); 83 Franklin Font (staff assistant); 19 Andy Green (bench); 68 Tommy Hottovy (pitching); 99 Anthony Iapoce (hitting); 55 Mike Napoli (quality assurance); 95 Chad Noble (bullpen catcher); 1 Terrmel Sledge (assistant hitting); 25 Will Venable (third base); 54 Chris Young (bullpen)

== Postseason ==
=== Game log ===
2020 postseason game log: 0–2 (Home: 0–2; Away: 0–0)
2020 National League Wild Card Series: 0–2 (Home: 0–2; Away: 0–0)

#	Date	Opponent	Score	Win	Loss	Save	Stadium	Record
1	September 30	Marlins	1–5	Alcántara (1–0)	**Hendricks** (0–1)	—	Wrigley Field	0–1
—	October 1	Marlins	Postponed (inclement weather)					
2	October 2	Marlins	0–2	Boxberger (1–0)	**Darvish** (0–1)	Kintzler (1)	Wrigley Field	0–2

Legend: = Win = Loss = Postponement
Bold = Cubs team member

=== Wild Card series ===
The Cubs hosted both games of the Wild Card series against the Miami Marlins. They would have hosted game 3 as well, had it been necessary. It was announced that Kyle Hendricks would make the start for the Cubs in Game 1 of the series on September 30. Yu Darvish started Game 2 of the series.

==== Game 1 ====
Hendricks pitched well through six innings, giving up no runs. However, the Cub offense struggled again, failing to score a run through four innings. Ian Happ homered in the fifth to give the Cubs a 1–0 lead. However, in the seventh, Hendricks gave up a three-run home run to Corey Dickerson to give the Marlins a 3–1 lead. Jeremy Jeffress relieved Hendricks and promptly gave up a single and a home run to Jesús Aguilar to increase Marlin lead to 5–1. The Cubs only managed two further baserunners as the Cubs lost game one 5–1. The loss put the Cubs on the verge of elimination from the playoffs in the best-of-three-game series.

==== Game 2 ====
The game scheduled for October 1 was postponed due to the potential for rain throughout the day. The game was rescheduled to October 2. Darvish pitched six scoreless innings before allowing a homer to Garrett Cooper and a run-scoring single to Magneuris Sierra in the seventh to give the Marlins a 2–0 lead. The Cub offense continued to struggle in the postseason, failing to score a run. The Cubs lost 2–0 and were eliminated from the postseason.

=== Postseason rosters ===
Playoff rosters
National League Wild Card Series

- Pitchers: 11 Yu Darvish 24 Jeremy Jeffress 28 Kyle Hendricks 30 Alec Mills 34 Jon Lester 39 Andrew Chafin 43 Dan Winkler 46 Craig Kimbrel 52 Ryan Tepera 56 Kyle Ryan 60 Jason Adam 62 José Quintana 73 Adbert Alzolay
- Catchers: 4 Josh Phegley 7 Víctor Caratini 40 Willson Contreras
- Infielders: 2 Nico Hoerner 9 Javier Báez 13 David Bote 16 Ildemaro Vargas 17 Kris Bryant 27 Jason Kipnis 44 Anthony Rizzo
- Outfielders: 6 Billy Hamilton 8 Ian Happ 12 Kyle Schwarber 15 Cameron Maybin 22 Jason Heyward

== Achievements and records ==
- Kyle Hendricks was named NL Player of the Week for the first week of the season after throwing a complete-game shutout in the season opener.
- Yu Darvish was named NL Pitcher of the Month for August. He went 5–0 with a 1.09 ERA and struck out 40 with just seven walks in the month.
- Following his no-hitter on September 13, Alec Mills was named NL Player of the Week. In two starts, Mills threw 15 shutout innings while allowing only four hits and six walks.

== Statistics ==
=== Regular season ===
==== Batting ====
(final statistics)

Note: G = Games played; AB = At bats; R = Runs; H = Hits; 2B = Doubles; 3B = Triples; HR = Home runs; RBI = Runs batted in; SB = Stolen bases; BB = Walks; K = Strikeouts; AVG = Batting average; OBP = On base percentage; SLG = Slugging percentage; TB = Total bases

Player	G	AB	R	H	2B	3B	HR	RBI	SB	BB	K	AVG	OBP	SLG	TB
Albert Almora Jr.	28	30	4	5	1	0	0	1	0	3	9	.167	.265	.200	6
Javier Báez	59	222	27	45	9	1	8	24	3	7	75	.203	.238	.360	80
David Bote	45	125	15	25	3	1	7	29	2	17	40	.200	.303	.408	51
Kris Bryant	34	131	20	27	5	1	4	11	0	12	40	.206	.293	.351	46
Victor Caratini	44	116	10	28	7	0	1	16	0	12	31	.241	.333	.328	38
Willson Contreras	57	189	37	46	10	0	7	26	1	20	57	.243	.356	.407	77
Billy Hamilton	14	10	6	3	0	0	1	1	3	1	4	.300	.364	.600	6
Ian Happ	57	198	27	51	11	1	12	28	1	30	63	.258	.364	.505	100
Jason Heyward	50	147	20	39	6	2	6	22	2	30	37	.265	.392	.456	67
Nico Hoerner	48	108	19	24	4	0	0	13	3	12	24	.222	.312	.259	28
Jason Kipnis	44	114	13	27	8	1	3	16	1	18	41	.237	.341	.404	46
José Martínez	10	21	0	0	0	0	0	0	0	1	7	.000	.045	.000	0
Cameron Maybin	18	52	3	13	4	1	0	5	3	3	12	.250	.304	.365	19
Alec Mills	1	1	0	0	0	0	0	0	0	0	1	.000	.000	.000	0
Hernán Pérez	3	6	0	1	0	0	0	0	0	0	2	.167	.167	.167	1
Josh Phegley	11	16	4	1	0	0	1	2	0	1	3	.063	.167	.250	4
Anthony Rizzo	52	203	26	45	6	0	11	24	3	28	38	.222	.342	.414	84
Kyle Schwarber	59	191	30	36	6	0	11	24	1	30	66	.188	.308	.393	75
Steven Souza Jr.	11	27	3	4	2	0	1	5	1	4	15	.148	.258	.333	9
Ildemaro Vargas	6	9	1	2	0	0	1	1	0	0	3	.222	.222	.556	5
Patrick Wisdom	2	2	0	0	0	0	0	0	0	0	0	.000	.000	.000	0
TEAM TOTALS	60	1918	265	422	82	8	74	248	24	229	567	.220	.318	.387	742

==== Pitching ====
(Final statistics)

Note: W = Wins; L = Losses; ERA = Earned run average; G = Games pitched; GS = Games started; SV = Saves; IP = Innings pitched; H = Hits allowed; R = Runs allowed; ER = Earned runs allowed; BB = Walks allowed; K = Strikeouts

Player	W	L	ERA	G	GS	SV	IP	H	R	ER	BB	K
Jason Adam	2	1	3.29	13	0	0	13.2	9	7	5	8	21
Adbert Alzolay	1	1	2.95	6	4	0	21.1	12	8	7	13	29
Rex Brothers	0	0	8.10	3	0	0	3.1	2	3	3	3	8
Andrew Chafin	0	1	3.00	4	0	1	3.0	2	1	1	1	3
Tyler Chatwood	2	2	5.30	5	5	0	18.2	22	11	11	9	25
Yu Darvish	8	3	2.01	12	12	0	76.0	59	18	17	14	93
Matt Dermody	0	0	0.00	1	0	0	1.0	0	0	0	0	1
Kyle Hendricks	6	5	2.88	12	12	0	81.1	73	26	26	8	61
Jeremy Jeffress	4	1	1.54	22	0	8	23.1	10	5	4	12	17
Craig Kimbrel	0	1	5.28	18	0	2	15.1	10	9	9	12	28
Jon Lester	3	3	5.16	12	12	0	61.0	64	35	35	17	42
Brailyn Márquez	0	0	67.50	1	0	0	0.2	2	5	5	3	1
Dillon Maples	0	0	18.00	2	0	0	1.0	1	3	2	4	1
Tyson Miller	0	0	5.40	2	1	0	5.0	2	3	3	3	0
Alec Mills	5	5	4.48	11	11	0	62.1	53	31	31	19	46
James Norwood	0	0	16.20	3	0	0	1.2	4	3	3	1	0
Josh Osich	0	0	10.13	4	0	0	2.2	5	6	3	0	4
Jose Quintana	0	0	4.50	1	0	0	10.0	10	5	5	3	12
Colin Rea	1	1	5.79	9	2	0	14.0	15	9	9	2	10
Kyle Ryan	1	0	5.17	18	0	1	15.2	16	9	9	6	11
Casey Sadler	0	0	5.79	10	0	0	9.1	8	6	6	8	9
Ryan Tepera	0	1	3.92	21	0	0	20.2	17	9	9	12	31
Duane Underwood Jr.	1	0	5.66	17	0	0	20.2	25	13	13	6	27
Rowan Wick	0	1	3.12	19	0	4	17.1	18	6	6	6	20
Brad Wieck	0	0	18.00	1	0	0	1.0	1	2	2	1	2
Dan Winkler	0	0	2.95	18	0	0	18.1	11	7	6	11	18
TEAM TOTALS	34	26	3.99	60	60	16	518.1	451	240	230	182	523

=== Postseason ===
==== Batting ====
(Final statistics)

Note: G = Games played; AB = At bats; R = Runs; H = Hits; 2B = Doubles; 3B = Triples; HR = Home runs; RBI = Runs batted in; SB = Stolen bases; BB = Walks; K = Strikeouts; Avg. = Batting average; OBP = On base percentage; SLG = Slugging percentage

Player	G	AB	R	H	2B	3B	HR	RBI	SB	BB	K	AVG	OBP	SLG	TB
Javier Baez	2	8	0	1	0	0	0	0	0	0	3	.125	.125	.125	1
David Bote	1	4	0	0	0	0	0	0	0	0	2	.000	.000	.000	0
Kris Bryant	2	8	0	0	0	0	0	0	0	0	2	.000	.000	.000	0
Victor Caratini	2	6	0	1	0	0	0	0	0	0	1	.167	.167	.167	1
Willson Contreras	2	4	0	1	1	0	0	0	0	1	0	.250	.625	.500	2
Ian Happ	2	8	1	4	0	0	1	1	0	0	1	.500	.500	.875	7
Jason Heyward	2	7	0	2	1	0	0	0	0	0	1	.286	.375	.429	3
Jason Kipnis	2	3	0	0	0	0	0	0	0	1	1	.000	.250	.000	0
Cameron Maybin	2	2	0	0	0	0	0	0	0	0	1	.000	.000	.000	0
Anthony Rizzo	2	8	0	0	0	0	0	0	0	0	3	.000	.000	.000	0
Kyle Schwarber	2	4	0	0	0	0	0	0	0	3	1	.000	.429	.000	0
TEAM TOTALS	2	62	1	9	2	0	1	1	0	5	16	.145	.254	.226	14

==== Pitching ====
(Final statistics)

Note: W = Wins; L = Losses; ERA = Earned run average; G = Games pitched; GS = Games started; SV = Saves; IP = Innings pitched; H = Hits allowed; R = Runs allowed; ER = Earned runs allowed; BB = Walks allowed; K = Strikeouts

Player	W	L	ERA	G	GS	SV	IP	H	R	ER	BB	K
Andrew Chafin	0	0	0.00	1	0	0	0.1	0	0	0	0	0
Yu Darvish	0	1	2.70	1	1	0	6.2	5	2	2	2	6
Kyle Hendricks	0	1	4.26	1	1	0	6.1	5	3	3	3	3
Jeremy Jeffress	0	0	10.80	2	0	0	1.2	3	2	2	0	2
Craig Kimbrel	0	0	0.00	1	0	0	1.1	0	0	0	2	2
Ryan Tepera	0	0	0.00	1	0	0	0.2	0	0	0	1	2
Dan Winkler	0	0	0.00	1	0	0	1.0	0	0	0	0	2
TEAM TOTALS	0	2	3.50	2	2	0	18.0	13	7	7	8	17

== Farm system ==
On June 30, it was announced that the 160 minor league baseball teams' seasons were canceled due to the COVID-19 pandemic. This marked the first time in the history of Minor League Baseball that a season had been canceled.

Level	Team	League	Manager	Location	Ballpark
AAA	Iowa Cubs	Pacific Coast League	Marty Pevey	Des Moines, Iowa	Principal Park
AA	Tennessee Smokies	Southern League	Michael Ryan	Knoxville, Tennessee	Smokies Stadium
A	Myrtle Beach Pelicans	Carolina League	Steven Lerud	Myrtle Beach, South Carolina	TicketReturn.com Field
A	South Bend Cubs	Midwest League	Buddy Bailey	South Bend, Indiana	Four Winds Field at Coveleski Stadium
A-Short Season	Eugene Emeralds	Northwest League	Lance Rymel	Eugene, Oregon	PK Park
Rookie	AZL Cubs 1	Arizona League	Jimmy Gonzalez	Mesa, Arizona	Sloan Park
Rookie	AZL Cubs 2	Arizona League	Carmelo Martinez	Mesa, Arizona	Sloan Park
Rookie	DSL Cubs 1	Dominican Summer League	Leo Perez	Boca Chica, Dominican Republic	Baseball City Complex
Rookie	DSL Cubs 2	Dominican Summer League	Carlos Ramirez	Boca Chica, Dominican Republic	Baseball City Complex

== Major League Baseball draft ==
The 2020 Major League Baseball (MLB) First-Year Player Draft occurred on Monday, June 10 through June 11, 2020. The draft assigned amateur baseball players to MLB teams. Due to the COVID-19 pandemic, the draft was shortened to only five rounds.

2020 Chicago Cubs complete draft list

Round	Pick	Name, Age	Pos / Bats	School (State)	Date sgnd.	Refs
1	16	Ed Howard	SS /R	Mount Carmel High School (IL)	June 21	
2	51	Burl Carraway	LHP / L	Dallas Baptist University (TX)		
3	88	Jordan Nwogu	OF / R	University of Michigan (MI)		
4	117	Luke Little	P / L	San Jacinto College (TX)		
5	147	Koen Moreno	P / R	Panther Creek High School (NC)		
