= Ian Happ =

American baseball player (born 1994)

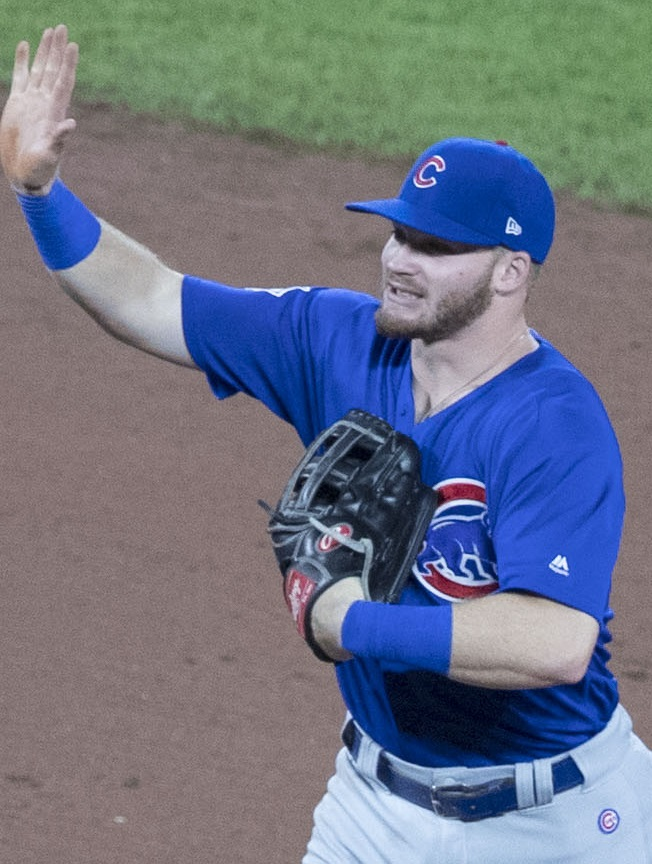
- Happ with the Chicago Cubs in 2017

Free agent
- Outfielder
- Born: August 12, 1994 (age 32); Pittsburgh, Pennsylvania, U.S.
- Bats: Switch Throws: Right

MLB debut
- May 13, 2017, for the Chicago Cubs

MLB statistics (through 2026 season)
- Batting average: .243
- Home runs: 197
- Runs batted in: 625
- Stats at Baseball Reference

Teams
- Chicago Cubs (2017–2026)

Career highlights and awards
- All-Star (2022); 4× Gold Glove Award (2022–2025)

Ian Edward Happ (born August 12, 1994) is an American professional baseball outfielder who is a free agent. He has played in Major League Baseball (MLB) for the Chicago Cubs. He played college baseball at the University of Cincinnati for the Cincinnati Bearcats. The Cubs selected Happ in the first round of the 2015 MLB draft, and he made his MLB debut in 2017. Happ was an All-Star in 2022 and won a Gold Glove Award four consecutive years from 2022 to 2025.

== Amateur career ==
Happ attended Mt. Lebanon High School in Mt. Lebanon, Pennsylvania. In four seasons, he hit .449 with 12 home runs and 65 runs batted in (RBIs).

He committed to the University of Cincinnati to play college baseball for the Bearcats. As a freshman, Happ started in all 56 games and had team-high .322 batting average, .483 slugging percentage, .451 on-base percentage, six home runs, 41 runs scored, 13 doubles, and 47 walks. As a sophomore in 2014, he started 50 of 51 games. He hit .322/.443/.497 with five home runs and 19 stolen bases. After Happ's freshman and sophomore seasons in 2013 and 2014, he played collegiate summer baseball for the Harwich Mariners of the Cape Cod Baseball League (CCBL), was named a league all-star both seasons, and is a member of the CCBL Hall of Fame class of 2022. As a junior, he played in 56 games for Cincinnati, hitting .369/.492/.672 with 14 home runs and 44 RBIs.

== Professional career ==
=== Draft and minor leagues ===
Happ was considered one of the top prospects for the 2015 Major League Baseball draft. The Chicago Cubs selected him in the first round, with the ninth overall selection. Happ became the 50th player drafted from the Cincinnati Bearcats; 2008 picks Josh Harrison (6th round) and Tony Campana (13th round) also both played for Cincinnati and were drafted by the Cubs, and former Bearcat and MLB 3-time All-Star Kevin Youkilis is the Cubs Scouting and Player Development consultant.

After he signed with the Cubs, Happ made his professional debut with the Eugene Emeralds of the Class A-Short Season Northwest League. In July, he was promoted to the South Bend Cubs of the Class A Midwest League. In 67 games between both clubs, he batted .259 with nine home runs and 33 RBIs. After playing the outfield positions during his first year of professional baseball, Happ was sent to the Myrtle Beach Pelicans of the Class A-Advanced Carolina League to start the 2016 season and began playing second base regularly. MLB.com ranked him the third best prospect in Chicago's farm system to start the year. Happ was promoted to the Tennessee Smokies of the Class AA Southern League in June. In 134 total games, he batted .279/.365/.445 with 15 home runs, 73 RBIs, and 16 stolen bases. After the season, the Cubs assigned Happ to the Mesa Solar Sox of the Arizona Fall League.

=== Major leagues ===
==== 2017–2019 ====
Happ began the 2017 season with the Iowa Cubs of the Class AAA Pacific Coast League. The Cubs promoted Happ to the major leagues on May 13. In 26 games for Iowa prior to his promotion, he was batting .298 with nine home runs and 25 RBIs. He made his debut the same day he was called up, and hit a 413-foot home run off of Carlos Martínez of the St. Louis Cardinals for his first career MLB hit. In a June 13 game at Citi Field against the New York Mets, Happ became the fifth player in MLB history to hit a grand slam and strike out four times in the same game. After Happ's 10th home run of the season, Cubs manager Joe Maddon said, "When he hits it, it goes quickly." Happ hit his 20th home run on August 30 against Pittsburgh Pirates starter Iván Nova. He hit his 23rd on September 28 and his 24th the following day which was the second-most for a rookie switch-hitter in National League history. He was third among NL rookies with 67 RBIs. Happ spent the remainder of the 2017 season with the Cubs after his June 13 promotion, and in 115 games, he slashed .253/.328/.514 with 24 home runs and 68 RBIs.

On March 29, 2018, opening day game against the Miami Marlins, Happ hit a home run off of Jose Urena on the first pitch, becoming the second player in MLB history to hit a home run off the first pitch of an MLB season. He finished the season slashing .233/.353/.408 with 15 home runs and 44 RBIs in 142 games, striking out 167 times.

Happ was optioned to the Iowa Cubs to begin the 2019 season, after slashing .135/.196/.192 during 17 spring training games, to work on cutting down his strikeout rate. Happ was recalled to the majors on July 25, 2019. Happ finished the season with 11 home runs and 30 RBIs. He slashed .297/.409/.622 in 58 games, striking out 39 times. He was named National League Player of the Week on September 30, 2019.

==== 2020–2022 ====
Happ started the COVID-19-shortened 2020 season in center field for the Cubs. He hit .258/.361/.505 with 12 home runs and 28 RBIs in 57 games.

Eligible for salary arbitration in 2021, Happ filed for a $4.1 million salary, and the Cubs countered with a proposal of $3.25 million. Happ won the hearing. In 2021, Happ hit .226/.323/.434 in 148 games for the Cubs. He led the team with 66 RBIs and set career highs with 105 hits, 25 home runs, 63 runs scored, and 9 stolen bases.

Happ and the Cubs agreed on a $6.85 million salary for the 2022 season. In 2022, Happ finished the season with a career-high 158 games played, hitting .271/.342/.440 with 17 home runs, 72 RBIs, 72 runs, and 42 doubles. He made his first All-Star game and on defense won a Gold Glove Award in left field.

==== 2023–present ====
In his final season of arbitration, Happ and the Cubs agreed to a $10.85 million salary. On April 13, 2023, Happ signed a three-year, $61 million contract extension with the Cubs. During a game against the Milwaukee Brewers on July 4, Happ threw out Andruw Monasterio and Owen Miller at home plate during extra innings. He became the first player with multiple outfield assists at home plate since Bernard Gilkey in 1992. Happ finished the season with 158 games played, hitting .248/.360/.431 with 21 home runs, 84 RBI, 86 runs, and 35 doubles. On November 5, Happ was awarded his second consecutive and second career Gold Glove Award for National League left fielders.

In the 2024 season, Happ finished the season with 153 games played, hitting .243/.341/.441 with 25 home runs, a career-high 86 RBI, a career-high 89 runs, and 34 doubles. On November 3, 2024, Happ was awarded his third consecutive and third career Gold Glove Award for National League left fielders.

In the 2025 season, Happ finished the season with 150 games played, hitting .243/.342/.420 with 23 home runs, 79 RBI, 87 runs, and 32 doubles. On November 2, 2025, Happ was awarded his fourth consecutive and fourth career Gold Glove Award for National League left fielders. Happ is the only player in Cubs history with three or more of them in the outfield.

On June 3, 2026, Happ recorded his 1,000th career hit on a double off of Jeffrey Springs of the Athletics.

== Personal life ==
In 2021, Happ invested in Jomboy Media, a digital media company that produces content focused on sports and pop culture. As part of the investment, Happ agreed to host his podcast, The Compound, on the Jomboy Media network.

Happ and girlfriend, Julie Mazur, got engaged in May 2022. They were married on November 18, 2023.
