= Patrick Wisdom =

American baseball player (born 1991)

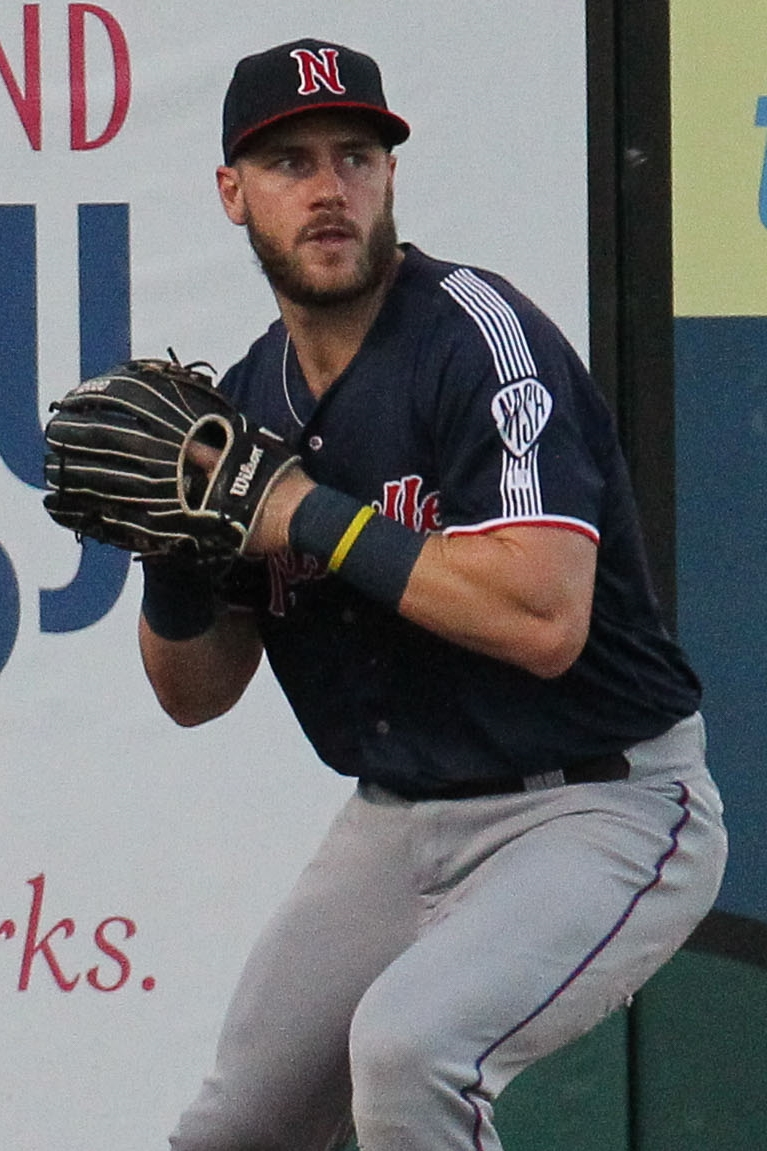
- Wisdom with the Nashville Sounds in 2019

Free agent
- Third baseman / First baseman
- Born: August 27, 1991 (age 35); Murrieta, California, U.S.
- Bats: Right Throws: Right

Professional debut
- MLB: August 12, 2018, for the St. Louis Cardinals
- KBO: March 22, 2025, for the Kia Tigers

MLB statistics (through 2026 season)
- Batting average: .205
- Home runs: 89
- Runs batted in: 211

KBO statistics (through 2025 season)
- Batting average: .236
- Home runs: 35
- Runs batted in: 85
- Stats at Baseball Reference

Teams
- St. Louis Cardinals (2018); Texas Rangers (2019); Chicago Cubs (2020–2024); Kia Tigers (2025); Seattle Mariners (2026)

Patrick Ian-Cashel Wisdom (born August 27, 1991) is an American professional baseball third baseman and first baseman who is a free agent. He has previously played in Major League Baseball (MLB) for the St. Louis Cardinals, Texas Rangers, Chicago Cubs, and Seattle Mariners and in the KBO League for the Kia Tigers. He played college baseball for the Saint Mary's Gaels and was selected by the Cardinals in the first round of the 2012 MLB draft. He made his MLB debut in 2018.

== Career ==
=== Amateur career ===
Wisdom attended Murrieta Valley High School in Murrieta, California. He played for the school's baseball team and had a .345 batting average in his senior year. He graduated in 2009.

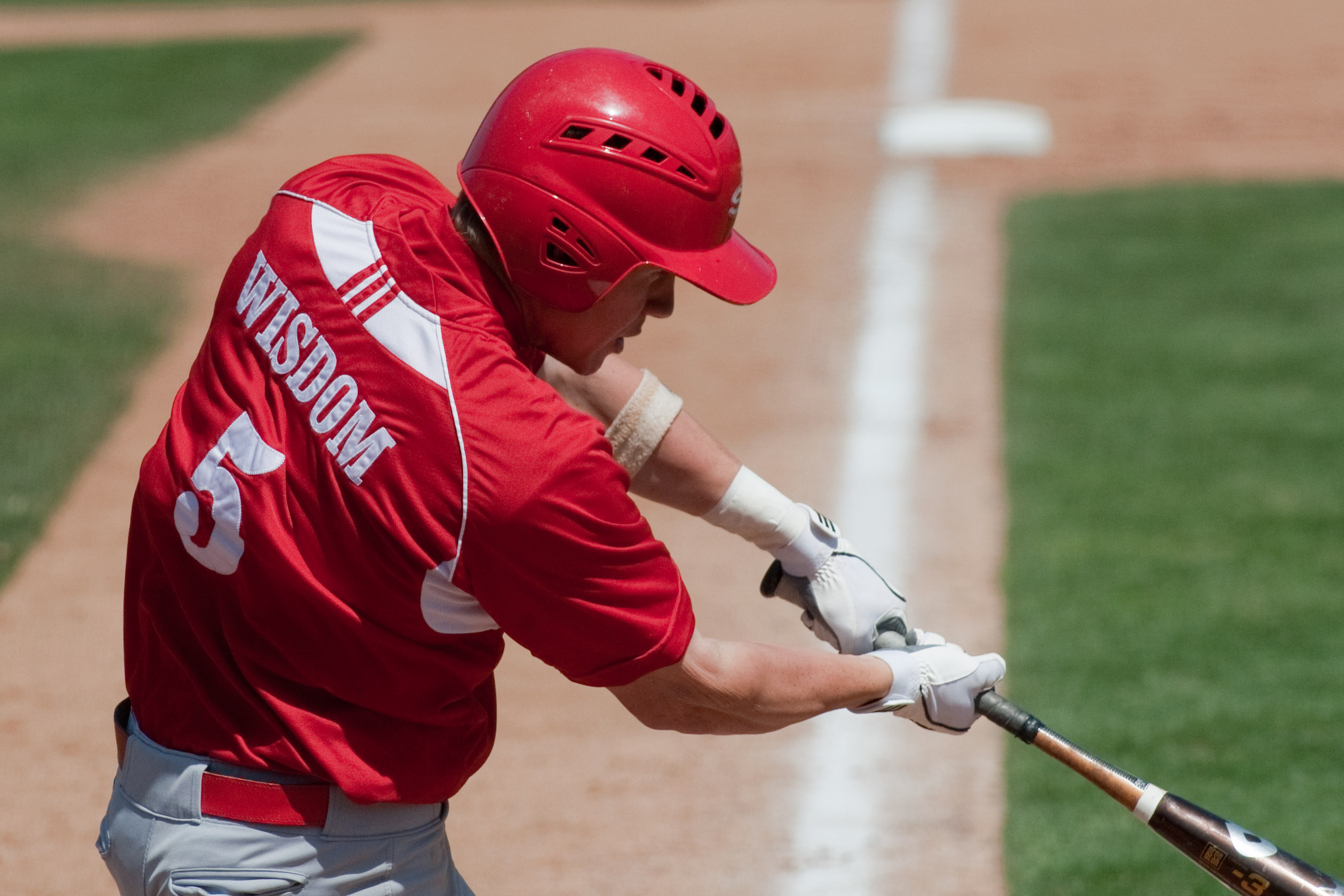
Wisdom with St. Mary's in 2010

Wisdom then attended enrolled at Saint Mary's College of California and played college baseball for the Saint Mary's Gaels. In three seasons, he was a career .303 hitter and third all-time in home runs with 29. He was named to the All-West Coast Conference (WCC) First Team in 2011, and the All-WCC Freshman Team in 2010.

=== St. Louis Cardinals ===
The St. Louis Cardinals selected Wisdom in the first round, with the 52nd overall selection, of the 2012 Major League Baseball draft. He signed and spent 2012 with the Batavia Muckdogs where he batted .282 with six home runs and 32 RBIs in 65 games. In 2013, Wisdom played with the Peoria Chiefs and Palm Beach Cardinals, batting a combined .235/.313/.401 with 15 home runs, 73 RBIs, and 137 strikeouts in 129 total games between both teams.

In 2014, he played for the Springfield Cardinals where he slashed .215/.277/.367 with 14 home runs, 53 RBIs, and 149 strikeouts (2nd in the Texas League) in 128 games, while playing third base where he made 26 errors and had a .928 fielding percentage. Wisdom returned to Springfield in 2015 where he batted .237/.294/.406 with 14 home runs, 61 RBIs, and 107 strikeouts (7th in the Texas League) in 114 games.

He spent the 2016 season with the Memphis Redbirds where he batted .233/.303./.374 with five home runs and 30 RBIs in 78 games. He returned to Memphis for the 2017 season, posting a .243 batting average with 31 home runs (tied for 4th in the PCL), 89 RBIs (tied for 7th), and 149 strikeouts (2nd) in 127 games.

Wisdom began 2018 back with Memphis. He was promoted to the major leagues on August 11, 2018, and he made his major league debut the next day at Kauffman Stadium versus the Kansas City Royals, collecting two hits and one RBI. He finished his 2018 campaign batting .260 with four home runs and ten RBIs in 32 games.

=== Texas Rangers ===
On December 11, 2018, Wisdom was traded to the Texas Rangers in exchange for Drew Robinson. In 2019, Wisdom was optioned to the Triple-A Nashville Sounds to open the season. On April 7, 2019, Wisdom was recalled to the major league roster when Ronald Guzmán was placed on the injured list. On July 6, Wisdom was designated for assignment.

On July 10, he cleared waivers and was outrighted to Nashville. He finished the season with Nashville hitting .240/.330/.513 with 31 home runs, 74 RBI, and 125 strikeouts. With Texas in the major leagues he batted .154/.185/.192 with 15 strikeouts in 26 at bats. Wisdom elected free agency following the season on November 4.

=== Seattle Mariners ===
On November 27, 2019, Wisdom signed a one-year major league contract with the Seattle Mariners. On August 10, 2020, Wisdom was designated for assignment without appearing in a game for Seattle. He was released on August 14.

=== Chicago Cubs ===
==== 2020–21 ====
On August 23, 2020, Wisdom signed a minor league contract with the Chicago Cubs organization. On September 25, Wisdom was selected to the 40-man and active rosters. He made his first appearance of 2020 that day as a pinch hitter for Anthony Rizzo. Wisdom was designated for assignment on September 27, following the promotion of Brailyn Márquez. Wisdom elected free agency on October 7. He signed a minor league contract with a non-roster invitation to spring training with the Cubs.

Wisdom started the 2021 season with the Iowa Cubs and was selected to the active roster on May 25. On May 25, he appeared as a pinch hitter for Andrew Chafin, grounding out to the shortstop. On May 27, Wisdom started in right field against the Pittsburgh Pirates. He struck out in his first at bat but hit a homer and a double for his next two at bats, making his first RBI as a Cub. On May 31, Wisdom hit a pair of solo home runs at Wrigley Field. Cubs manager David Ross showed his confidence towards Wisdom, especially for his power. The following day Wisdom hit another, giving him four home runs in eight games with the Cubs. On June 7, Wisdom was named the National League (NL) Player of the Week, after hitting .435 with a 1.719 on-base plus slugging (OPS) and 6 home runs. He also became one of three players to hit as many as seven homers within their first eight starts with a team, joining Trevor Story of the Colorado Rockies in 2016 and Aristides Aquino of the Cincinnati Reds in 2019.

On September 19, Wisdom hit his 27th home run, breaking the record for most home runs by a Cubs rookie set by Kris Bryant in 2015. On September 24, Wisdom homered against the Cardinals once more. By the end of the season, Cubs placed Wisdom to the injured list. Wisdom finished the season batting .231/.305/.518 with 28 home runs, 61 RBI, and 163 strikeouts (9th in the NL) in 106 games. He struck out in 44.1% of his at bats against left-handers, the highest percentage in the majors, and struck out in 40.8% of all of his at bats.

His 2021 split demonstrated his early dominance with a 1.633 OPS in May during 15 at bats and .950 OPS in June during 73 at bats. Through July and August, he maintained a high OPS of .785 and .828, but he started to experience a much higher strike out rate around 50 percent from August to September. Despite his fall in late season, Wisdom managed to have a 117 OPS+. Manager Ross noted that Wisdom filled a lot of holes in the 2021 Cubs.

==== 2022–2024 ====
Wisdom started on Opening Day in 2022 as a third basemen and batted eighth in the lineup. He did have a hit but recorded sacrifice fly in the fifth inning. He led the majors in strikeout rate (34.3%), and batted .207/.298/.426 with 25 home runs, 66 RBI, and 183 strikeouts (second in the NL) in 134 games. At third base, Wisdom was second in the league in errors (14). Still, he made some improvement in terms of his ability in medium/high leverage situations, increasing his medium-leverage wRC+ from 125 (140 at bats) to 144 (187 at bats) and his high-leverage wRC+ from 161 (29 at bats) to 163 (38 at bats).

In 2023, Wisdom struck out 36.8% of the time, and batted .205/.289/.500 with 23 home runs, 46 RBI, and 111 strikeouts in 268 at-bats. He was third in the NL in errors at third base (11) and had a .927 fielding percentage.

In 75 games for Chicago in 2024, Wisdom slashed .171/.237/.392 with eight home runs, 23 RBI, and five stolen bases. The Cubs designated Wisdom for assignment on November 20, following the acquisition of Eli Morgan. On November 22, the Cubs non-tendered Wisdom, making him a free agent.

=== Kia Tigers ===
On December 26, 2024, Wisdom signed a one-year, $1 million deal with the Kia Tigers of the KBO League. Wisdom played in 119 games for the Tigers in 2025, batting .236/.321/.535 with 35 home runs and 85 RBI. On December 24, the Tigers elected to sign Harold Castro rather than retain Wisdom.

=== Seattle Mariners (second stint) ===
On January 7, 2026, Wisdom signed a minor league contract with the Seattle Mariners. He was assigned to the Triple-A Tacoma Rainiers to begin the regular season. On April 14, the Mariners selected Wisdom's contract, adding him to their active roster. Wisdom was optioned to Tacoma on June 15. In 19 total appearances for Seattle, he batted .106/.160/.191 with one home run and four RBI. On November 2, Wisdom was removed from the 40–man roster and elected free agency.

== Personal life ==
Wisdom and his wife have three children. He is a wine enthusiast and became a certified oenologist.
