= Nico Hoerner =

American baseball player (born 1997)

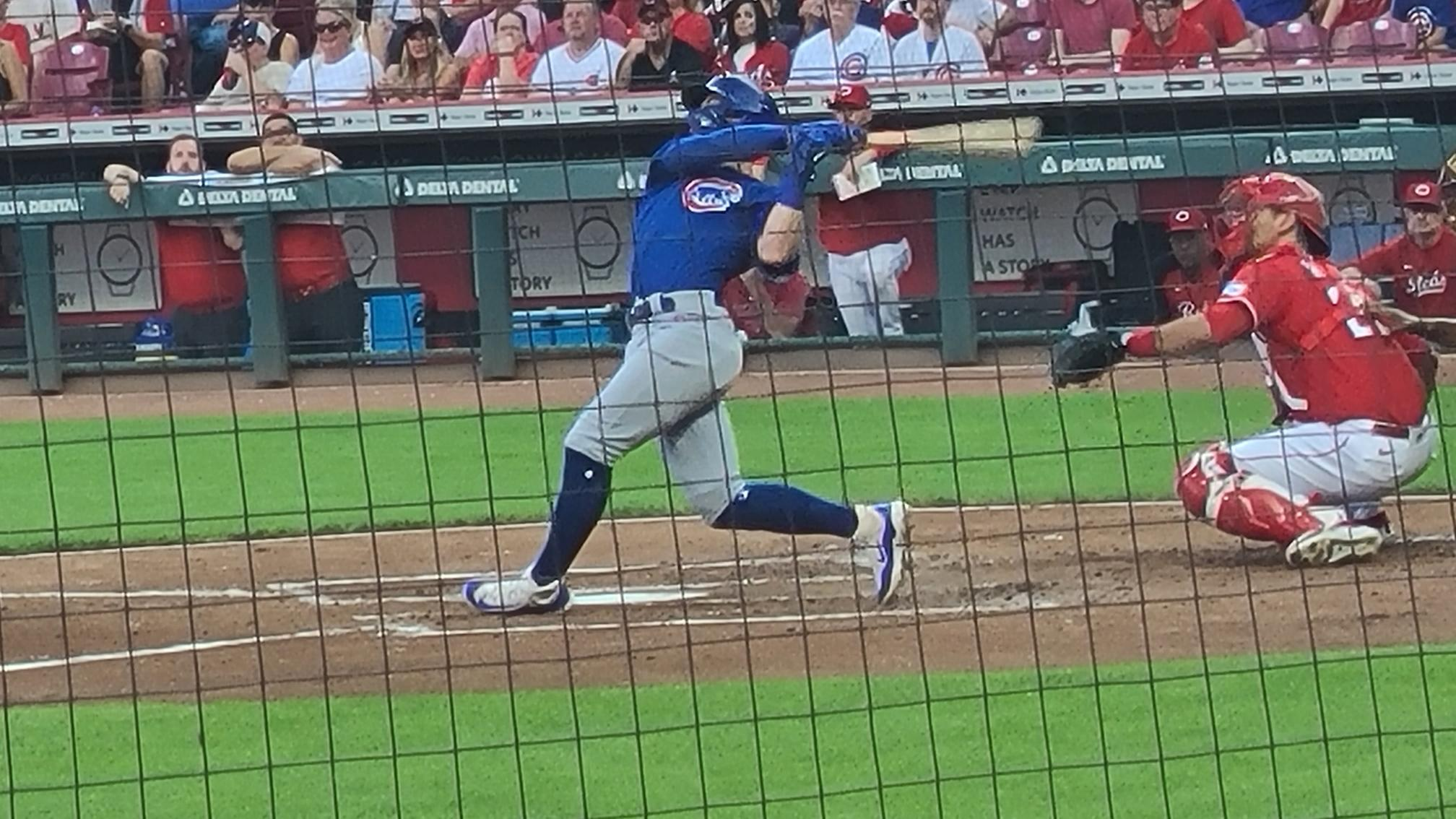
- Hoerner with the Chicago Cubs in a game vs. the Cincinnati Reds in 2023

Chicago Cubs – No. 2
- Second baseman / Shortstop
- Born: May 13, 1997 (age 29); Oakland, California, U.S.
- Bats: Right Throws: Right

MLB debut
- September 9, 2019, for the Chicago Cubs

MLB statistics (through 2026 season)
- Batting average: .278
- Home runs: 44
- Runs batted in: 350
- Stolen bases: 154
- Stats at Baseball Reference

Teams
- Chicago Cubs (2019–present)

Career highlights and awards
- 2× Gold Glove Award (2023, 2025)

Nicholas Mackie Hoerner (born May 13, 1997) is an American professional baseball middle infielder for the Chicago Cubs of Major League Baseball (MLB). He played college baseball at Stanford University, and was selected by the Cubs in the first round of the 2018 MLB draft. He made his MLB debut in 2019. He has won two Gold Glove Awards.

== Amateur career ==
Hoerner attended Head-Royce School in Oakland, California, where he played soccer, basketball, and baseball. He played for the varsity baseball team all four years of high school and in 2015, as a senior, batted .517 with six home runs, 30 RBIs, and 40 runs scored. He was not drafted out of high school in the 2015 Major League Baseball draft. Hoerner then enrolled at Stanford University to play college baseball for the Stanford Cardinal.

== College career ==
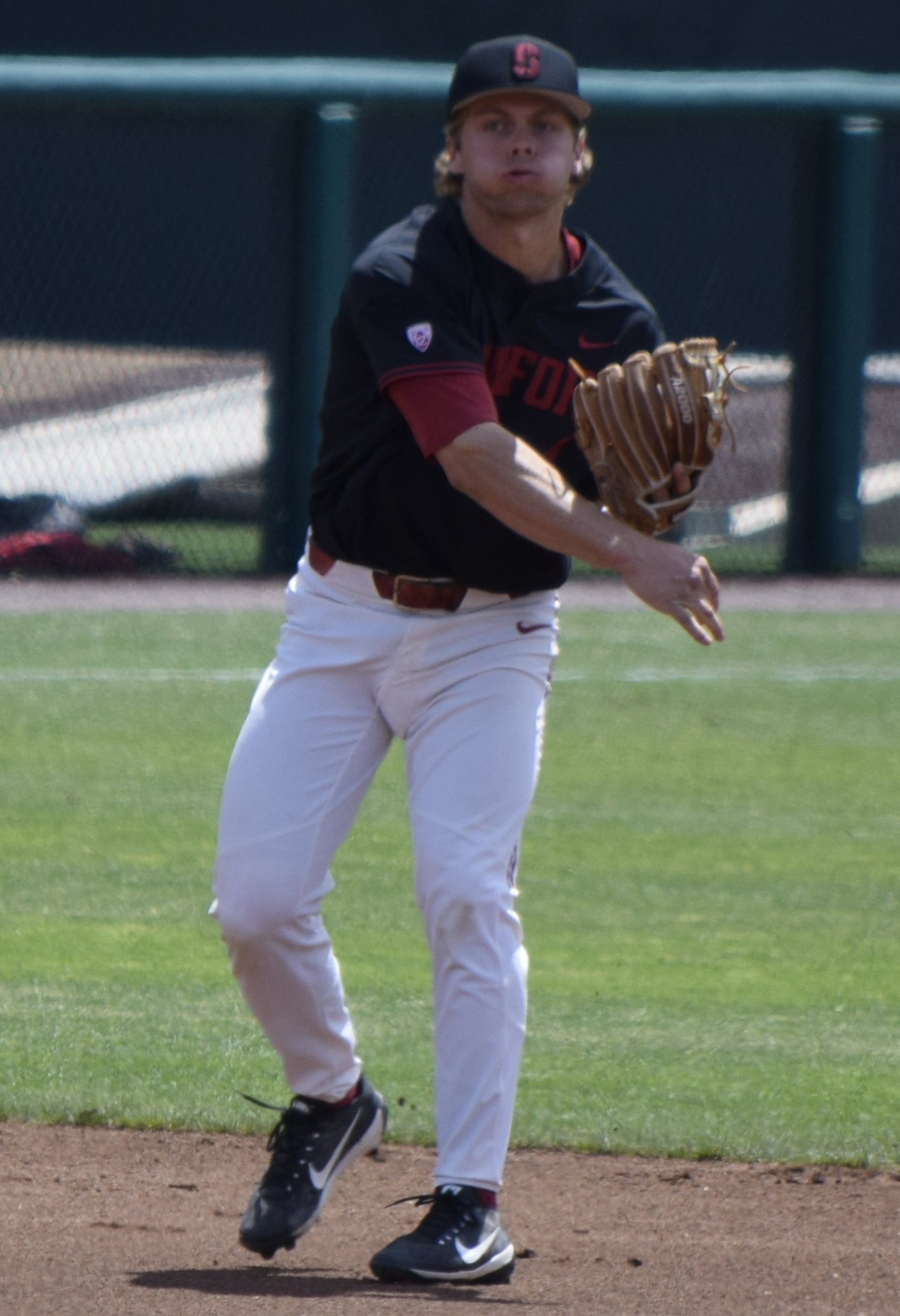
Hoerner at Stanford in 2018

In 2016, as a freshman, Hoerner started 53 of Stanford's 54 games at second base, batting .254 with 53 hits, 24 RBIs, and eight doubles. After the season, he played with the Madison Mallards of the Northwoods League where he hit .304 with two home runs, 31 RBIs, 11 stolen bases, and 12 doubles in 257 at-bats.

As a sophomore at Stanford in 2017, Hoerner switched positions, moving to shortstop. He started all 58 of Stanford's games that year and slashed .307/.357/.406 with 18 doubles, one home run, and 33 RBIs. Hoerner was named to the All-Pac-12 and All-Pac-12 Defensive teams. That summer, he played in the Cape Cod Baseball League with the Yarmouth-Dennis Red Sox where he batted .301 with six home runs, 30 RBIs, 16 stolen bases and eight doubles, and was named a league all-star.

As a junior in 2018, Hoerner batted .345 with two home runs, 40 RBIs, and 15 stolen bases and was named to the All-Pac-12 team for the second straight year.

== Professional career ==
=== Draft and minor leagues ===
Hoerner was selected 24th overall by the Chicago Cubs in the 2018 Major League Baseball draft and signed for a $2.72 million signing bonus.

Hoerner made his professional debut with the Arizona League Cubs, was reassigned to the Eugene Emeralds in June, and was promoted to the South Bend Cubs in mid-July. However, he was placed on the disabled list on July 18 with a strained ligament in his left elbow, and was ruled out for the remainder of the regular season. In 14 games between the three teams prior to his injury, he hit .327 with two home runs, six RBIs, and six stolen bases. After the season, he was assigned to the Mesa Solar Sox of the Arizona Fall League.

Hoerner began 2019 with the Tennessee Smokies. He was placed on the injured list on April 27 after being hit on his left wrist, and returned to play in early July. Over seventy games with the Smokies, he slashed .284/.344/.399 with three home runs, 22 RBIs, and eight stolen bases.

=== Chicago Cubs (2019–present) ===
==== 2019 season ====
Chicago selected Hoerner's contract and promoted him to the major leagues on September 9, 2019, making him the first player from his draft class to make it to the majors. He made his major league debut that night versus the San Diego Padres. Hoerner got the start at shortstop and went 3-for-5 with four RBIs, including a single in his first at-bat against Cal Quantrill. Over twenty games for the Cubs, Hoerner batted .282 with three home runs and 17 RBIs.

==== 2020: Rookie season ====
In a shortened 2020 season for the Cubs, Hoerner slashed .222/.312/.259 with 13 RBIs over 48 games.

==== 2021 season ====
Hoerner struggled with oblique injuries in 2021 and appeared in only 44 games for the Cubs. Over 149 at-bats, he slashed .302/.382/.369 with ten doubles, 16 RBIs, and five stolen bases.

==== 2022 season ====
During the Cubs' Opening Day game against the Milwaukee Brewers on April 7, 2022, Hoerner hit a two-run home run off of reigning NL Cy Young winner Corbin Burnes, the first home run of the 2022 MLB season and Hoerner's first since 2019. Hoerner had a much improved 2022 season, missing far fewer games, appearing in 135. He made 517 plate appearances while slashing .281/.327/.410 with 22 doubles, ten homers, and 55 RBIs. Hoerner played 133 of those games at shortstop and finished second in the National League in Outs Above Average.

==== 2023: Gold Glove Award ====
After the Cubs signed free agent shortstop Dansby Swanson in December 2022, it was anticipated that Hoerner would move to second base. On January 13, 2023, Hoerner agreed to a one-year, $2.525 million contract with the Cubs, avoiding salary arbitration. On March 27, Hoerner signed a three-year, $35 million extension with the Cubs. On May 30, Hoerner hit a first-pitch home run to lead off a game against the New York Mets. On July 19, Hoerner hit his first career grand-slam against the Washington Nationals. On August 15, Hoerner became the first Cub since Tony Campana in 2012 to steal 30 bases in a single season. On September 13, Hoerner stole his 40th base of the season. He became the first Cub since Juan Pierre in 2006 to do so. He also became the fourth player in the last 100 years for the Cubs to steal 40 bases and have 60 RBIs.

Hoerner played in 150 games during the 2023 season, slashing .283/.346/.383 with nine home runs, 68 RBIs, 98 runs scored, and 43 stolen bases. He also finished first in assists with 411. On November 5, Hoerner was awarded the Gold Glove Award at second base. With teammate Dansby Swanson winning the award at shortstop, they became the 13th middle-infield duo to win the award and the first since Joe Panik and Brandon Crawford in 2016.

==== 2024 ====
Hoerner played in 151 games for the Cubs in 2024, slashing .273/.335/.373 with seven home runs, 48 RBI, and 31 stolen bases. On October 11, 2024, Hoerner underwent flexor tendon surgery.

==== 2025: 2nd Gold Glove ====
Hoerner played in 156 games for the Cubs in 2025, slashing .297/.345/.394 with seven home runs, 61 RBI, and 29 stolen bases. With a .301 batting average as of mid-September, he competed with Trea Turner for the National League batting title, but fell short, finishing second. On November 2, 2025, Hoerner was awarded his second career Gold Glove Award for National League second basemen.

==== 2026 ====
On March 27, 2026, Hoerner agreed to a six-year, $141 million contract extension with the Cubs. He played in 159 games in 2026 and had a .263/.316/.350 slash line across 628 at-bats (third in the National League) with eight home runs, 72 RBIs, and 23 stolen bases, while on defense leading the National League with 416 assists.

== Personal life ==
His parents, Fred Hoerner and Keila Diehl, are both educators. Fred has retired and Keila works for the University of California, Berkeley. Hoerner has one sibling, a sister, named Annika.

Hoerner grew up a fan of the Oakland Athletics.
