= Rowan Wick =

Canadian baseball pitcher (born 1992)

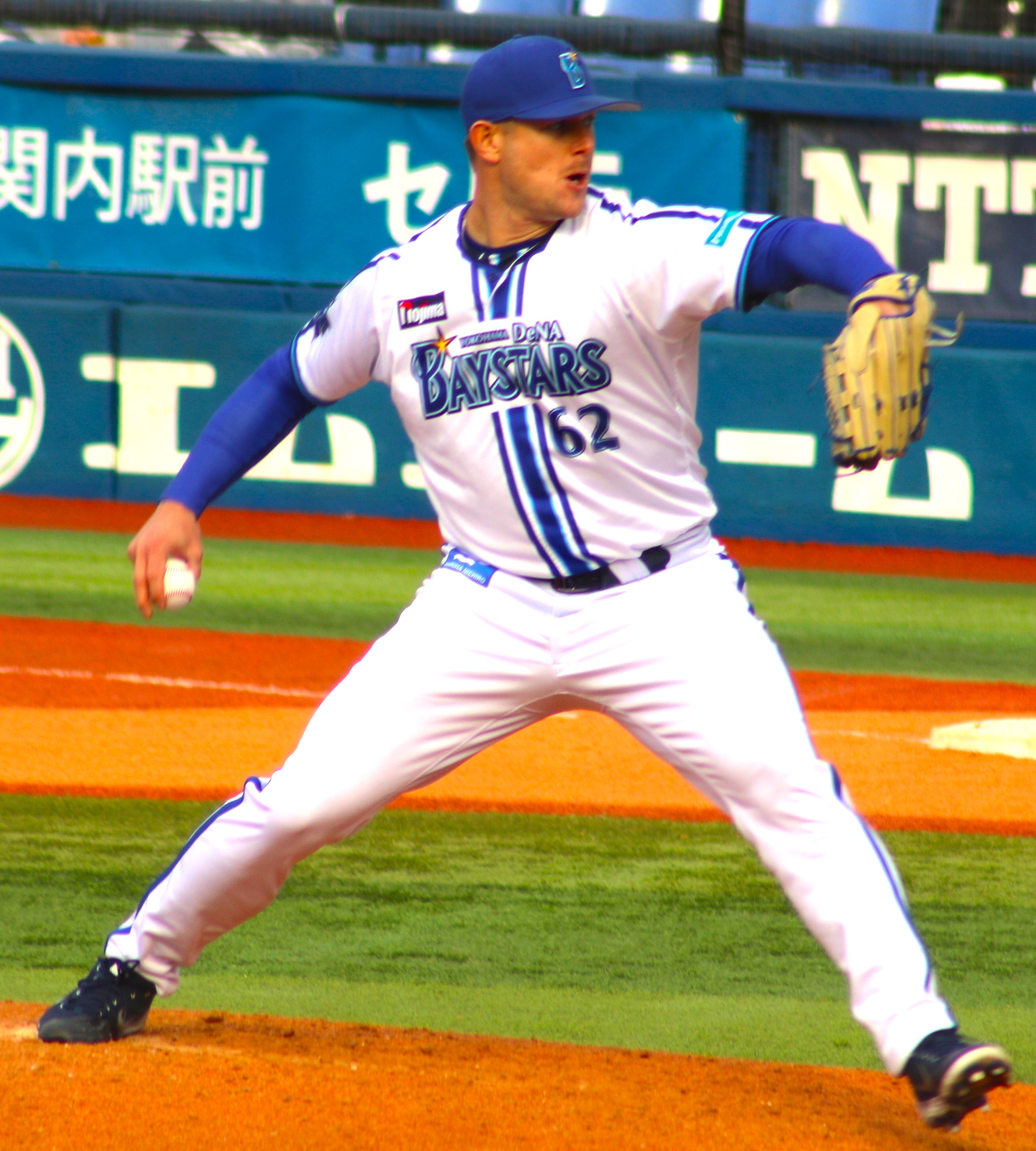
- Wick with the Yokohama DeNA BayStars in 2024

Free agent
- Pitcher
- Born: November 9, 1992 (age 34); North Vancouver, British Columbia, Canada
- Bats: Left Throws: Right

Professional debut
- MLB: August 31, 2018, for the San Diego Padres
- NPB: March 30, 2024, for the Yokohama DeNA BayStars

MLB statistics (through 2022 season)
- Win–loss record: 6–10
- Earned run average: 3.82
- Strikeouts: 160

NPB statistics (through 2025 season)
- Win–loss record: 9–2
- Earned run average: 1.75
- Strikeouts: 99
- Stats at Baseball Reference

Teams
- San Diego Padres (2018); Chicago Cubs (2019–2022); Yokohama DeNA BayStars (2024–2025)

Career highlights and awards
- Japan Series champion (2024)

Rowan David Wick (born November 9, 1992) is a Canadian professional baseball pitcher who is a free agent. He has previously played in Major League Baseball (MLB) for the San Diego Padres and Chicago Cubs, and in Nippon Professional Baseball (NPB) for the Yokohama DeNA BayStars.

== Career ==
=== Amateur ===
Wick attended Carson Graham Secondary School in North Vancouver, British Columbia, Canada and was drafted by the Milwaukee Brewers in the 19th round of the 2010 MLB draft. He did not sign with the Brewers and attended St. John's University to play college baseball. After one year at St. John's, Wick transferred to Cypress College. He played for the La Crosse Loggers of the summer collegiate Northwoods League during the summer of 2011. He was drafted by the St. Louis Cardinals in the ninth round of the 2012 MLB draft.

=== St. Louis Cardinals ===
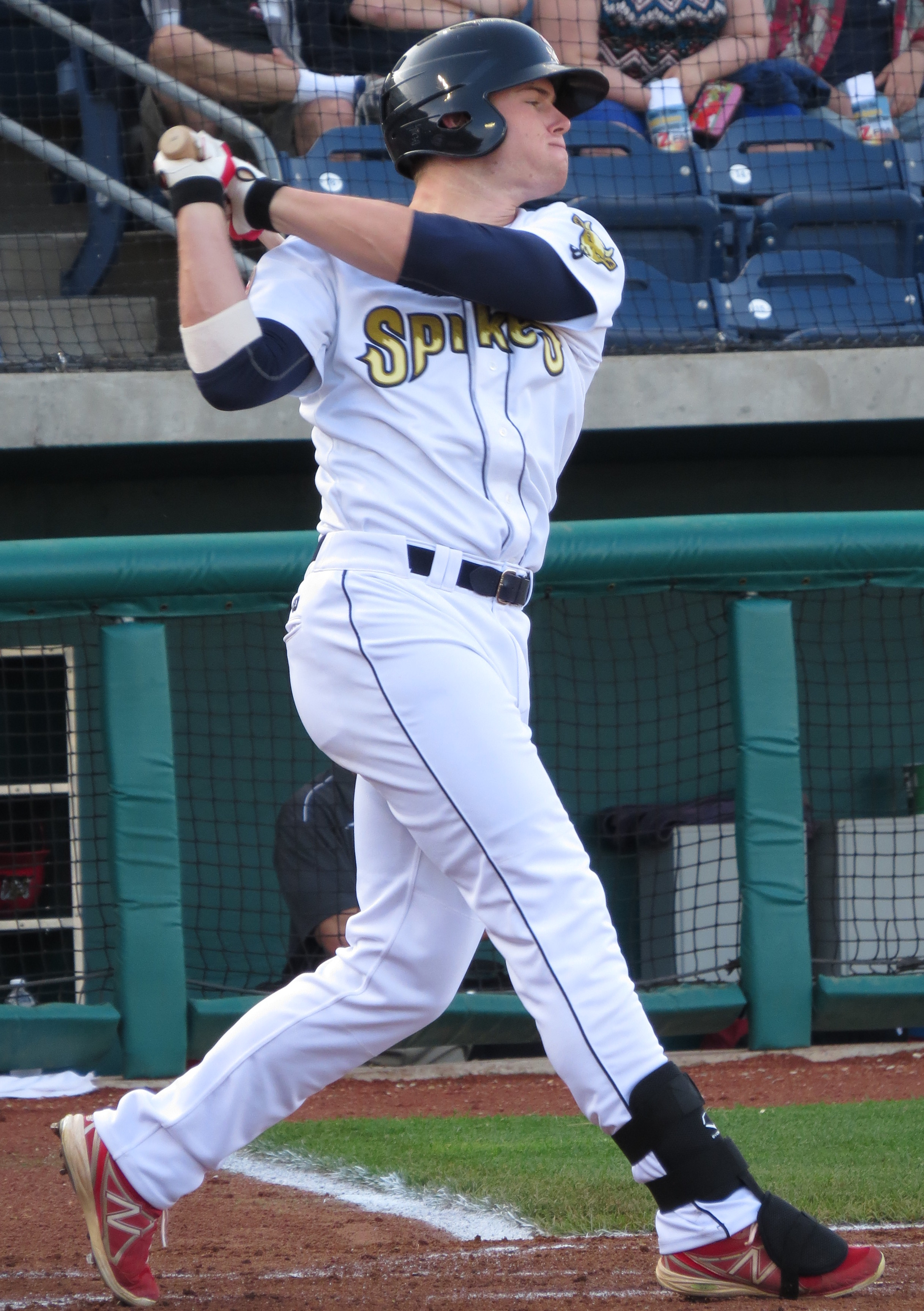
Wick batting for the State College Spikes in 2014

Wick signed with the Cardinals and started his professional career as a catcher. He made his professional debut in 2012 with the Gulf Coast Cardinals where he batted .156 in 23 games. He gave up 12 passed balls in 12 games.

He played 2013 with the Johnson City Cardinals. He batted .256 with 10 home runs and 35 RBIs in 56 games. He split his time on defense between catcher and right field.

In 2014, Wick switched to the outfield, where he played with the State College Spikes and Peoria Chiefs, compiling a .292 batting average with 20 home runs and 60 RBIs in 74 games between the two teams. He played 64 games in right field and seven games in left field.

In 2015, Wick started the season with the Palm Beach Cardinals. He had a slow start with the bat; batting .198 in 33 games, playing right field. He was transitioned into a pitcher and finished the season with the Gulf Coast Cardinals, giving up two runs in two innings.

In 2016, his first full season as a pitcher, he played for both Palm Beach and the Springfield Cardinals, where he posted a 2–0 record and 2.44 ERA with 20 walks and 57 strikeouts in 44.1 innings pitched out of the bullpen. After the season, the Cardinals assigned Wick to the Glendale Desert Dogs of the Arizona Fall League where he had a 4.50 ERA, and added him to their 40-man roster.

In 2017, Wick began the season with the Memphis Redbirds, but was placed on the disabled list on May 14 and was not reactivated until July 10. After being reactivated, he reported to Springfield. He returned to Memphis in September. In 16 appearances for Springfield, he posted a 2.08 ERA and in 14 appearances for Memphis he was 2–1 with a 5.40 ERA.

On February 14, 2018, Wick was designated for assignment by the Cardinals after the signing of Bud Norris became official.

=== San Diego Padres ===
On February 16, 2018, Wick was claimed off waivers by the San Diego Padres. On March 28, Wick was removed from the 40-man roster and sent outright to the Triple-A El Paso Chihuahuas. He began the season with the Double-A San Antonio Missions. On August 31, Wick made his MLB debut against the Colorado Rockies. He was 0–1 with a 6.48 ERA and seven strikeouts in 10 games for the Padres during his rookie campaign.

=== Chicago Cubs ===
On November 20, 2018, Wick was traded to the Chicago Cubs in exchange for Jason Vosler. In 2019 for the Cubs, Wick appeared in 31 games, recording a 2–0 record and 2.43 ERA with 16 walks and 35 strikeouts in 33 1/3 innings pitched.

In the shortened 2020 season, Wick appeared in 19 games for Chicago, pitching to a 3.12 ERA with 20 strikeouts in 17 1/3 innings of work. He went on the injured list in September with a left oblique strain.

On April 26, 2021, Wick was placed on the 60-day injured list with a left oblique intercostal strain. He missed the first four months of the season with the injury. On August 10, Wick was activated off of the injured list. He was 0–1 with a 4.30 ERA in 22 games for the Cubs. Between the High-A South Bend Cubs and the Triple-A Iowa Cubs, he was 1–0 with a 6.14 ERA.

In 2022, Wick made 64 appearances out of the bullpen for Chicago, logging a 4-7 record and 4.22 ERA with 69 strikeouts and nine saves in 64 innings pitched. On November 18, 2022, Wick signed a one-year, $1.55 million contract with the Cubs, avoiding arbitration.

On March 27, 2023, Wick was removed from the 40-man roster and sent outright to Triple-A Iowa. In 23 games for Iowa, he struggled to an 8.60 ERA with 35 strikeouts in 30 1/3 innings pitched. Wick was released by the Cubs organization on July 15.

=== Toronto Blue Jays ===
On July 27, 2023, Wick signed a minor league contract with the Atlanta Braves. He did not appear in a game for the Braves organization and was released on July 31.

On August 2, 2023, Wick signed a minor league contract with the Toronto Blue Jays organization. In 20 games for the Triple–A Buffalo Bisons, he posted a 3.86 ERA with 38 strikeouts and 5 saves in 21.0 innings of work. Wick elected free agency following the season on November 6.

=== Yokohama DeNA BayStars ===
On December 16, 2023, Wick signed with the Yokohama DeNA BayStars of Nippon Professional Baseball. He made 43 appearances for the BayStars in 2024, compiling a 5-1 record and 2.60 ERA with 50 strikeouts and one save over 45 innings of work.

Wick made 40 relief appearances for Yokohama during the 2025 campaign, registering a 4-1 record and 0.84 ERA with 49 strikeouts and five saves across 42 2/3 innings pitched. On December 2, 2025, Wick and the BayStars parted ways.

=== San Francisco Giants ===
On February 13, 2026, Wick signed a one-year contract with the San Francisco Giants that included a club option for 2027. Wick was transferred to the 60-day injured list two days later, a result of a Tommy John procedure he underwent during his time with the BayStars. Following the season, on November 2, the Giants declined the club option. On November 17, Koss was designated for assignment by the Giants. Three days later, on November 20, Wick was non-tendered by the Giants and became a free agent.
