= Eugene Emeralds =

- Founded in 1955; Eugene, Oregon
Team logo
Cap insignia

Minor league affiliations
- Class: High-A (2021–present)
- Previous classes: Class A Short Season (1974–2019); Triple-A (1969–1973); Class A Short Season (1966–1968); Class A (1963–1965); Class B (1955–1962)
- League: Northwest League (1974–present)
- Previous leagues: Pacific Coast League (1969–1973); Northwest League (1955–1968)

Major league affiliations
- Team: San Francisco Giants (2021–present)
- Previous teams: Chicago Cubs (2015–2020); San Diego Padres (2001–2014); Chicago Cubs (1999–2000); Atlanta Braves (1995–1998); Kansas City Royals (1984–1994); Cincinnati Reds (1975–1983); Philadelphia Phillies (1967–1973); Philadelphia Phillies and St. Louis Cardinals (1966); Philadelphia Phillies (1964–1965); Chicago White Sox (1963); San Francisco Giants (1959–1962)

Minor league titles
- League titles (8): 1955; 1974; 1975; 1980; 2016; 2018; 2021; 2022
- Division titles (16): 1955; 1957; 1964; 1969; 1974; 1975; 1978; 1980; 1985; 1986; 1996; 2000; 2011; 2016; 2017; 2018
- First-half titles (2): 2022; 2026
- Second-half titles (2): 2025; 2026

Team data
- Name: Eugene Emeralds (1955–present)
- Colors: Sasquatch black, emerald green, neon green, white
- Mascot: Sluggo
- Ballpark: PK Park (2010–present)
- Previous parks: Civic Stadium (1969–2009); Bethel Park (1955–1968)
- Owner/ Operator: Elmore Sports Group
- General manager: Allan Benavides
- Manager: Jacob Heyward
- Website: milb.com/eugene

The Eugene Emeralds (nicknamed the Ems) are a Minor League Baseball team in the northwest United States, based in Eugene, Oregon and playing at PK Park. The Emeralds are members of the Northwest League and the High-A affiliate of the San Francisco Giants.

== History ==
Founded 71 years ago in 1955 as a charter member of the Northwest League, the Emeralds were named in a contest won by 11-year-old Bowen Blair. They won the inaugural pennant as an independent, and remained in the NWL for 14 seasons through 1968. The Emeralds were the first minor-league team to play in Eugene since the disbanding of the Eugene Larks, who played at Bethel Park for just two seasons, 1950 and 1951.

The Emeralds played in northwest Eugene in 4,000-seat Bethel Park, on the northwest corner of Roosevelt Boulevard and Maple Street (44.0644°N 123.1454°W), later razed for the construction of a highway that was never built. In 1950 and 1951, Bethel Park was the home of the Eugene Larks of the Class D Far West League; its outfield is present-day Lark Park. The Larks' final game on August 29, 1968 drew 897 fans for a one-hitter and a 7-0 Emeralds win. The NWL changed to a short-season league in 1966. The second pick in the 1966 MLB draft, future hall of famer Reggie Jackson, played his first professional games at Bethel Park, hitting a single and home run in his second game.

In the 1969 season, the Emeralds were promoted to AAA status in the Pacific Coast League (PCL) as the primary affiliate of the Philadelphia Phillies. The team returned to the Northwest League five years later when the PCL moved the AAA team to Sacramento for the 1974 season, while the Phillies moved their AAA farm team to the Toledo Mud Hens of the International League. Eugene was an independent co-op team shared by the Phillies and San Francisco Giants in 1974 and became an affiliate of the Cincinnati Reds in 1975.

Entering Triple-A in 1969, the Emeralds moved from Bethel Park to Civic Stadium. The 6,800-seat facility was owned by the Eugene School District and built in 1938 as a venue for high-school football, which was played there until 1968. Civic Stadium also hosted semipro baseball teams, sponsored by local timber companies, until Bethel Park was built in 1950. Facing an outdated stadium and high maintenance costs, in 2010, the Emeralds moved to PK Park, the new baseball stadium across town that was built by the University of Oregon. The park is adjacent to the university's Autzen Stadium and near the Willamette River. The team shares the facility with the Oregon Ducks college baseball team, whose regular season ends in May. Civic Stadium was destroyed by arson in 2015.

A new logo, based on Sasquatch, was adopted by the Emeralds in 2012. Following the 2014 season, the Emeralds switched their major-league affiliation from the San Diego Padres to the Chicago Cubs, with a two-year deal through 2016. The player-development contract was extended through the 2018 season on June 14, 2016.

In 2016, the Emeralds were awarded two "Golden Bobblehead" awards for their promotions with Children's Miracle Network and their honorary player that year, Hayden Kumle.

The Emeralds won the NWL title in 2018 despite finishing in last place with a 31–45 record. The team, dubbed the "Bad News Ems", clinched a wild-card playoff spot with a 17-21 record in the second half, second behind Hillsboro, who had finished first in both halves, and swept Hillsboro and Spokane in the postseason. The team's.408 regular-season winning percentage was the worst ever for a NWL champion. Following that season, the Emeralds were awarded the 53rd annual Larry MacPhail Award in recognition for their promotions. In 2019, the Emeralds unveiled their Monarcas de Eugene on-field identity as part of minor-league baseball's Copa de Diversion initiative.

After the 2020 season was canceled during the COVID-19 pandemic, Eugene was invited to become the High-A affiliate of the San Francisco Giants. The Emeralds were assigned to the High-A West league with five other teams previously of the Northwest League. Eugene ended the 2021 season in first place with a 69–50 record. They then defeated the Spokane Indians, 3–1, to win the High-A West championship. In 2022, the High-A West was renamed as the Northwest League.

The Emeralds began to seek a new stadium following the promotion to the High-A level and its longer season. Team officials met with Lane County officials to discuss the feasibility of constructing a new stadium at the Lane Events Center. On March 13, 2024, the Eugene City Council voted to place a $15 million bond measure on the ballot for the May 21 primary election. This would partially fund the stadium project's expected cost of more than $104 million. However, Lane County administrators had advised a reset in planning before committing to this project. City councilors had previously required this commitment and financial reports of the stadium's operations. The Lane Events Center master plan did not include the Emeralds' stadium because it was too large, requiring removal of the multiuse indoor arena, and would detract from fairground operations by hindering profitable events, with an expected annual loss of $200,000.

== Playoffs ==
- 1974: Defeated Bellingham 2–1 to win league championship.
- 1975: Defeated Portland 2–0 to win league championship.
- 1979: Lost to Grays Harbor 1–0 in finals.
- 1980: Declared co-champion with Bellingham.
- 1985: Lost to Everett 1–0 in finals.
- 1986: Lost to Bellingham 1–0 in finals.
- 1996: Lost to Yakima 2–0 in finals.
- 2000: Lost to Yakima 3–2 in finals.
- 2011: Lost to Vancouver 2–1 in semifinals.
- 2016: Defeated Hillsboro 2–1 in semifinals; defeated Everett 2–1 to win league championship.
- 2017: Defeated Hillsboro 2–0 in semifinals; Lost to Vancouver 3–1 in finals.
- 2018: Defeated Hillsboro 2–0 in semifinals; defeated Spokane 3–0 to win league championship.
- 2021: Defeated Spokane 3–1 to win league championship.
- 2022: Defeated Vancouver 3-0 to win league championship.

== Notable alumni ==
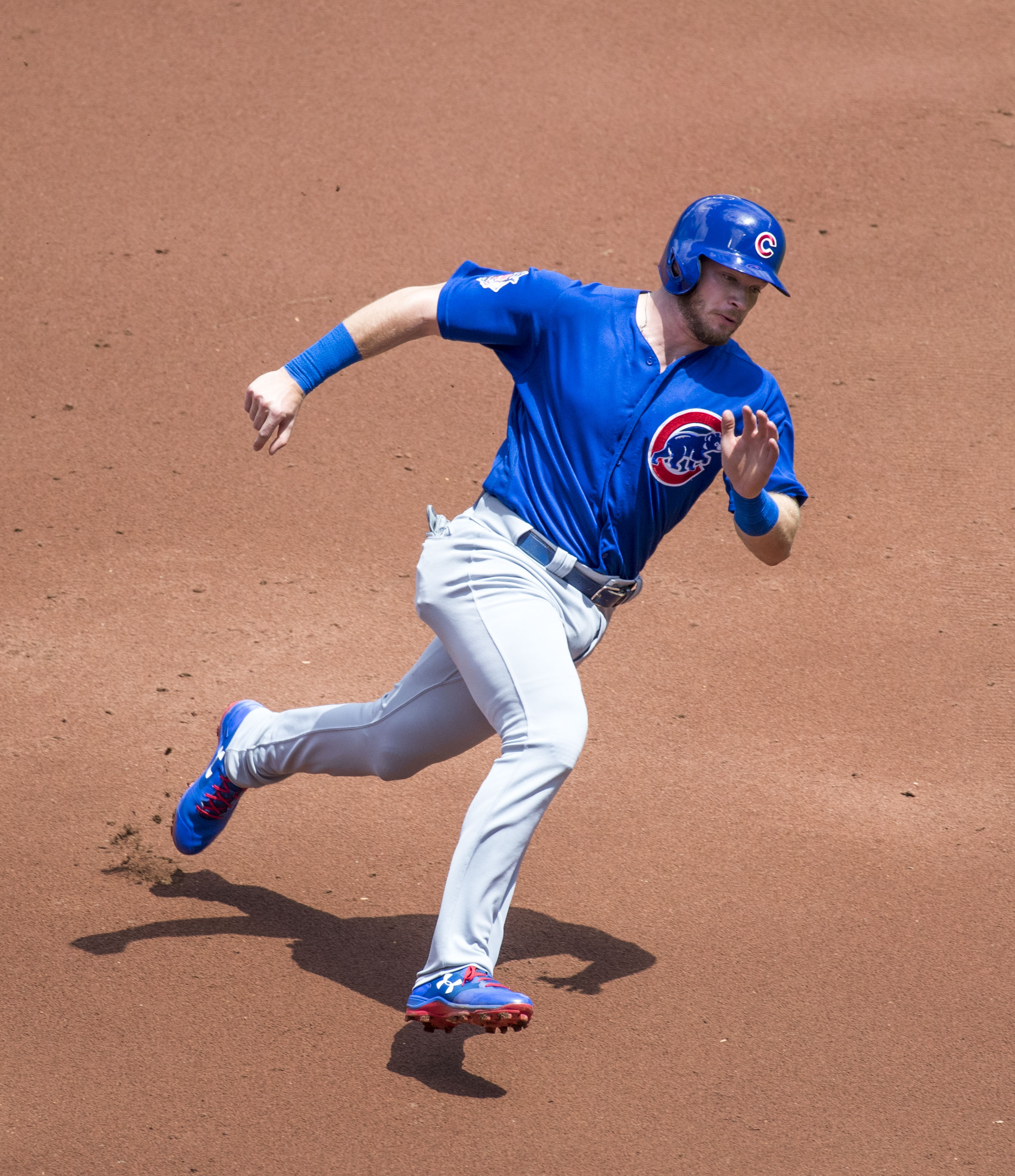
Ian Happ (2015 Eugene Emeralds outfielder)

Hall of Fame alumni

- Jim Bunning (1973, MGR) Inducted, 1996
- Mike Schmidt (1972) Inducted, 1995

Notable alumni

- Jesús Alou (1961) 2x World Series Champion
- Adbert Alzolay (2015)
- Rubén Amaro (1971) 1964 Gold Glove
- Matt Andriese (2011)
- Kevin Appier (1987) 1995 All-Star; 2002 World Series Champion; Kansas City Royals Hall of Fame
- Patrick Bailey (2021-2022)
- Jason Bartlett (2001) 2009 AL All-Star
- Anthony Bass (2008)
- Bob Boone (1972) 4 x MLB All-Star
- Larry Bowa (1969) 5 x MLB All-Star; 2001 NL Manager of the Year
- Tim Byrdak (1994)
- José Cardenal (1961) 3x World Series Champion
- Lance Carter (1994) 2003 AL All-Star
- Dylan Cease (2016) All-MLB Second Team (2022)
- Bruce Chen (1996)
- Adam Cimber (2013)
- Franchy Cordero (2014)
- Juan Cruz (1999)
- Eric Davis (1980–1981) 2 x MLB All-Star; 3x Gold Glove; 1992 World Series Champion; Cincinnati Red Hall of Fame
- Mark DeRosa (1996)
- Rob Dibble (1983) 2 x MLB All-Star, 1990 NLCS MVP, 1990 World Series Champion
- Alex Dickerson (2014)
- Dick Dietz (1962)
- Denny Doyle (1969)
- Scott Effross (2015)
- Bryce Eldridge (2014)
- Logan Forsythe (2008)
- David Freese (2006) MLB All-Star; 2011 World Series Most Valuable Player
- Nate Freiman (2009)
- Oscar Gamble (1970–72)
- Trent Giambrone (2016)
- Tom Gordon(1987) 3x All-Star; 1998 AL Saves Leader 3 x MLB All-Star
- Trevor Gott (2013)
- Khalil Greene (2002)
- Tayron Guerrero (2013)
- Jedd Gyorko (2010)
- Shane Halter (1991)
- Bob Hamelin (1988) 1994 AL Rookie of the Year
- Ian Happ (2015)2022 All-Star; 2022 Gold Glove
- Kyle Harrison (2022)
- Chase Headley (2005) 2012 NL RBI Leader; 2012 Gold Glove; 2012 Silver Slugger
- Austin Hedges (2011)
- Greg Hibbard (1986)
- Larry Hisle (1971) 2 x MLB All-Star
- Nico Hoerner (2018)
- Jay Howell (1976) 3x All Star 1988 World Series
- Nick Hundley (2005)
- Grant Jackson (1964)
- Eloy Jimenez (2015) 2020 Silver Slugger
- Brandon Kintzler (2004-2005)
- Corey Kluber (2007) 2 x MLB Cy Young Award & 3 x All-Star
- Mat Latos (2007-2008)
- Wade LeBlanc (2006)
- Charlie Leibrandt (1978)
- Jon Lieber (1992) 2001 NL All-Star
- Jose Lobaton (2004-2005)
- Marco Luciano (2021-2022)
- Greg Luzinski (1971) 4 x MLB All-Star
- Vimael Machin (2015-2016)
- Mike Marshall (1965) 1974 NL Cy Young Award
- Brailyn Márquez (2018)
- Brian McRae (1986)
- Wade Meckler (2023)
- Miles Mikolas (2009) 2x MLB All-Star
- Dave Miley (1981)
- Willie Montañez (1970) MLB All-Star
- Christopher Morel (2018)
- Mélido Pérez (1985)
- Odális Pérez (1995) 2002 NL All-Star
- Jace Peterson (2011)
- Kevin Quackenbush (2011)
- Joe Randa (1991)
- Horacio Ramirez (1998)
- Hunter Renfroe (2013)
- Franmil Reyes (2013)
- Bill Robinson (1972) 1979 World Series Champion
- John Rocker (1995)
- Manuel Rodriguez (2017)
- Larry Rothschild (1975) 2x World Series Champion
- Jeff Russell (1980) 2 x MLB All-Star
- Zack Short (2006)
- Eric Sogard (2007)
- Mario Soto (1975) 3 x MLB All-Star
- Cory Spangenberg (2014)
- Justin Steele (2015) 2023 NL All-Star
- Mike Sweeney (1992–1993) 5 x MLB All-Star
- Andre Thornton (1968) 2 x MLB All-Star)
- Keegan Thompson (2017)
- Trea Turner (2014) 2x All-Star; 2022 All-MLB First Team; 2021 NL Batting Champion, 2019 World Series Champion
- Will Venable (2005)
- Nick Vincent (2007)

=== See also ===
- Eugene Emeralds players (1955–present)
- Eugene Larks players (1950–1951)

== Roster ==
Eugene Emeralds roster
Players		Coaches/Other
Pitchers: 16 Sam Bower; 54 Luis De La Torre; 52 Hunter Dryden; 53 Matt Dunaway; 39 Mauricio Estrella; 48 Jordan Gottesman; 14 Alix Hernandez; 17 Cole Hillier; 29 Gerelmi Maldonado; 16 Ramon Marquez; 28 Ubert Mejias; 48 Nate Nabholz; 13 Eric Nachtsheim; 41 Brayan Palencia; 45 Liam Simon; 43 Ryan Slater; 56 Cade Vernon; 33 Hayden Wynja	Catchers: 7 Charlie Muniz; 40 Daniel Rogers; Infielders: 6 Isaiah Barkett; 35 Robert Hipwell; 26 Hayden Jatczak; 9 Jhonny Level; 13 Walker Martin; 5 Jose Ramos; 32 Dalton Wentz; Outfielders: 38 Damian Bravo; 26 Jakob Christian; 15 Cam Maldonado; 2 Jose Ortiz	Manager: 34 Jacob Heyward; Coaches: 61 Nate Keavy (fundamentals); 51 Braxton Lee (hitting); 10 Luis Pino (pitching); 60-day injured list: -- Josh Bostick; 7-day injured list; * On San Francisco Giants 40-man roster; ~ Development list; # Rehab assignment; ∞ Reserve list; ‡ Restricted list; § Suspended list; † Temporarily inactive list; Roster updated September 22, 2026; Transactions; → More rosters: MiLB • Northwest League; → San Francisco Giants minor league players
