= Adbert Alzolay =

Venezuelan baseball player (born 1995)

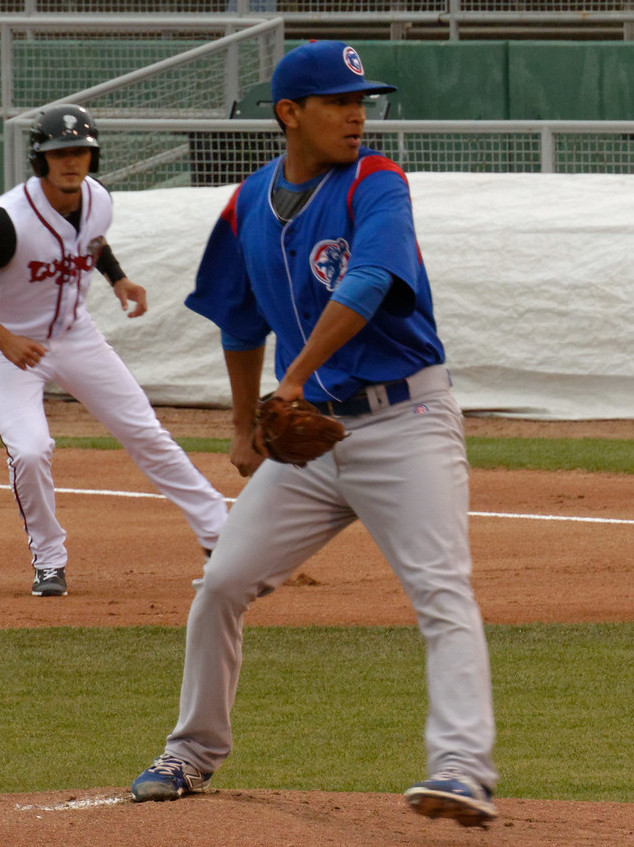
- Alzolay with the South Bend Cubs in 2016

Toros de Tijuana – No. 73
- Pitcher
- Born: March 1, 1995 (age 31); San Felix, Venezuela
- Bats: Right Throws: Right

MLB debut
- June 20, 2019, for the Chicago Cubs

MLB statistics (through 2024 season)
- Win–loss record: 12–25
- Earned run average: 4.04
- Strikeouts: 269
- Stats at Baseball Reference

Teams
- Chicago Cubs (2019–2024)

Adbert Marcelo Alzolay (/ˈælzəlaɪ/ AL-zə-ly; born March 1, 1995) is a Venezuelan professional baseball pitcher for the Toros de Tijuana of the Mexican League. He has previously played in Major League Baseball (MLB) for the Chicago Cubs. He made his MLB debut in 2019.

== Career ==
=== Chicago Cubs ===
Alzolay signed with the Chicago Cubs as an international free agent on March 8, 2013. He made his professional debut that year with the Venezuelan Summer League Cubs and spent the whole season there, posting a 5–3 record and 1.07 ERA in 15 games. He pitched with the Arizona League Cubs and Boise Hawks in 2014, going a combined 2–5 with a 7.90 ERA in ten total games between both teams, the Eugene Emeralds in 2015 where he went 6–2 with a 2.04 ERA, and the South Bend Cubs in 2016, pitching to a 9–4 record and 4.34 ERA in 22 games (twenty starts).

Alzolay spent 2017 with both the Myrtle Beach Pelicans and the Tennessee Smokies, posting a combined 7–4 record and 2.99 ERA in 22 starts. After the season, he played in the Arizona Fall League and was selected to play in the Fall Stars Game. The Cubs added him to their 40-man roster after the season.

He appeared in 8 games for the Iowa Cubs in 2018, before suffering a strained lat muscle that ended his season. Alzolay opened the 2019 season on the injured list with a recurrence of the injury. Upon returning, he played one game with Myrtle Beach and then was assigned to Iowa.

On June 20, 2019, Alzolay was called up to the major leagues for the first time. He made his MLB debut that night versus the New York Mets, recording five strikeouts over four innings in relief. Alzolay appeared in six games for the Cubs in 2020, pitching to a 1–1 record and 2.95 ERA with 29 strikeouts in 21 1/3 innings pitched. In 2021, Alzolay made 29 appearances (21 starts) for Chicago, compiling a 5–13 record and 4.58 ERA with 128 strikeouts across 125 2/3 innings of work.

Alzolay was placed on the 60-day injured list to start the 2022 on season on March 18, 2022, with a right shoulder strain. He was activated from the injured list on September 17. Alzolay made only six relief outings for the Cubs in 2022, compiling a 3.38 ERA with 19 strikeouts across 13 1/3 innings of work.

Alzolay began the 2024 season out of Chicago's bullpen, where he recorded a 4.67 ERA in 18 appearances. He was placed on the injured list with a forearm strain on May 13, and was transferred to the 60–day injured list on June 2. On August 7, manager Craig Counsell announced that Alzolay would be undergoing Tommy John surgery, ending his season. He was designated for assignment by the Cubs on November 19. On November 22, the Cubs non–tendered Alzolay, making him a free agent.

=== New York Mets ===
On January 24, 2025, Alzolay signed a two-year minor league contract with the New York Mets. On March 15, he was placed on the full–season injured list, ruling him out for the entirety of the season as he continued to recover from Tommy John.

Alzolay split time in 2026 between the rookie–level Florida Complex League Mets, Single–A St. Lucie Mets, High–A Brooklyn Cyclones, and Triple–A Syracuse Mets; in 14 appearances (one start) for the four affiliates, he accumulated a 1–1 record and 7.36 ERA with 10 strikeouts across 14 2/3 innings pitched. He was released by the Mets organization on July 1, 2026.

=== Toros de Tijuana ===
On July 16, 2026, Alzolay signed with the Toros de Tijuana of the Mexican League.

== See also ==
- List of Major League Baseball players from Venezuela
