= Brailyn Márquez =

Dominican baseball player (born 1999)

- Pitcher
- Born: January 30, 1999 (age 27); Santo Domingo, Dominican Republic
- Batted: Left Threw: Left

MLB debut
- September 27, 2020, for the Chicago Cubs

Last MLB appearance
- September 27, 2020, for the Chicago Cubs

MLB statistics
- Win–loss record: 0–0
- Earned run average: 67.50
- Strikeouts: 1
- Stats at Baseball Reference

Teams
- Chicago Cubs (2020)

Brailyn Márquez (born January 30, 1999) is a Dominican former professional baseball pitcher. He has previously played in Major League Baseball (MLB) for the Chicago Cubs.

== Professional career ==
Márquez signed with the Chicago Cubs as an international free agent, in August 2015. He made his professional debut in 2016 with the Dominican Summer League Cubs, going 4–2 with a 1.48 earned run average (ERA) over 12 starts. Márquez played 2017 with the Arizona League Cubs, pitching to a 2–1 record and a 5.52 ERA over 11 games (nine starts), and 2018 with the Eugene Emeralds and South Bend Cubs, compiling a 1–4 record with a 3.13 ERA over 12 starts.

Márquez started 2019 with South Bend before being promoted to the Myrtle Beach Pelicans. Over 22 starts between the two teams, he pitched to a 9–5 record with a 3.13 ERA, striking out 128 over 103 2/3 innings.

Márquez was selected to the 40-man and active rosters by the Cubs on September 27, 2020. He made his MLB debut that night against the Chicago White Sox, pitching 2/3 of an inning of relief.

In 2021, Márquez suffered a delayed spring training, a COVID-19 infection, as well as a left shoulder strain, all culminating in a lost season of development for him. In 2022, Márquez underwent a surgical debridement procedure on his left shoulder and missed the entire season.

On November 18, 2022, Márquez was non-tendered and became a free agent. On December 5, Márquez re-signed with the Cubs on a minor league contract. Márquez split the 2023 season between the Double–A Tennessee Smokies, High–A South Bend, Single–A Myrtle Beach, and the rookie–level Arizona Complex League Cubs. In 23 combined appearances, he accumulated a 4.99 ERA with 44 strikeouts across 30 2/3 innings of work. Márquez elected free agency following the season on November 6, 2023.

On December 3, 2023, Márquez signed a minor league contract with the Houston Astros. He was released on February 22, 2024.
