= Checked swing =

Type of motion in baseball

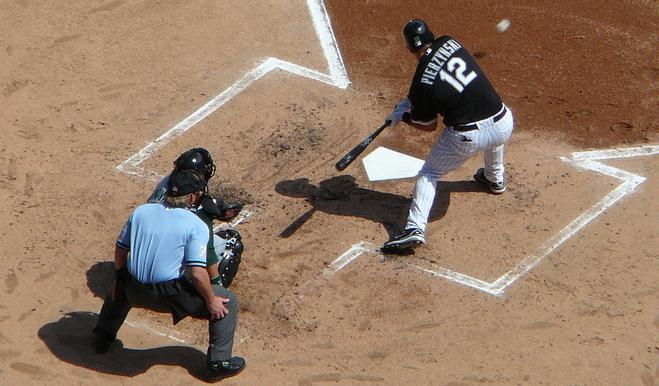
A. J. Pierzynski of the Chicago White Sox checks his swing on a low pitch.

A checked swing, sometimes also referred to as a check-swing or check swing, is a type of motion in baseball made by a batter. A checked swing is not an official term or call in baseball, such as a strike or ball, but is a common phrase used by commentators, fans, players, etc. to describe a situation in which a batter starts to swing the bat at a pitched ball, but stops the swing in order to allow the ball to pass without hitting it. The call or outcome of a so-called checked swing relies on whether the umpire determines the motion to have (the batter was unsuccessful in "checking" their swing) or not (the batter successfully stopped or "checked" their swing) have been a swing and whether the pitch was a ball or a strike if the swing was checked. After the determination of whether a swing has occurred, regular rules governing the call of strikes or balls apply (see #Examples of possible outcomes)

== How a checked swing is determined ==
Initially, the home plate umpire must determine if a swing was checked or not checked. If the umpire indicates that it was checked, an appeal can be made by the catcher or the manager, and the home plate umpire can then make a request to either the 1st or 3rd base umpire to make the call as to whether the swing was indeed checked. To maximize visibility, the 1st base umpire makes the call for right-handed batters, and the 3rd base umpire for left-handed batters. The umpire makes a "safe" gesture to indicate a checked swing or makes a clenched fist to indicate a full swing. However, if the home plate umpire initially indicates that the swing was not checked, no appeal can be made, and attempts to protest the ruling can be seen as arguing with the umpire over strikes or balls.

Importantly, the Major League Baseball rulebook does not contain an official definition for either a checked swing or even a "swing" at all. In a game, it is solely the decision of the umpire as to whether an attempt was made or not. Generally, factors such as whether the bat passes the front of the plate may be considered in the ruling. Some umpires prefer to use the "breaking the wrists" criterion as the method to decide a checked swing: if the wrists "rolled over", a swing occurred. Matt Snyder of CBS Sports wrote in 2019:

Now, for decades and decades, fans, players, media, umpires alike have come to accept a general idea of what constitutes a swing ("did he go?"), but it's not defined in the rulebook. We can talk about breaking wrists or the head of the bat clearing home plate or the barrel passing by the front of the body, but all of these ideas came about through generally accepted word of mouth. None of them have ever been officially defined by Major League Baseball.

Beginning in the Arizona Fall League in 2024, several minor leagues affiliated with MLB have introduced the Check Swing Challenge system, which uses Hawk-Eye technology to determine that a batter swung at a pitch, if their bat is at least 45 degrees from home plate.

== Examples of possible outcomes ==
=== When the ball does not touch the bat ===
If a pitch goes through the strike zone, it is ruled a strike regardless of if the swing was checked or not. If a pitch does not go through the strike zone and the umpire determines that the swing was successfully checked (meaning no swing occurred), the pitch is ruled a ball. If a pitch does not go through the strike zone but the umpire determines that the swing was not successfully checked (meaning a swing did occur), the pitch is ruled a strike.

=== When the ball touches the bat ===
A checked swing sometimes results in an unintentional swinging bunt, where the ball hits the bat and rolls a short distance, even though the batter is determined as having stopped the swing. If a pitch is hit during a checked swing, normal rules apply: the ball is in play as long as it is not foul.

== Other ==
Checked swinging can also be used in some warm-up exercises, such as the game pepper.

== See also ==
- Late leave (cricket)
- Final out of the 2021 National League Division Series, a controversial call on an attempted checked swing
