= Instant replay in Major League Baseball =

Method for MLB officials to review on-field decisions

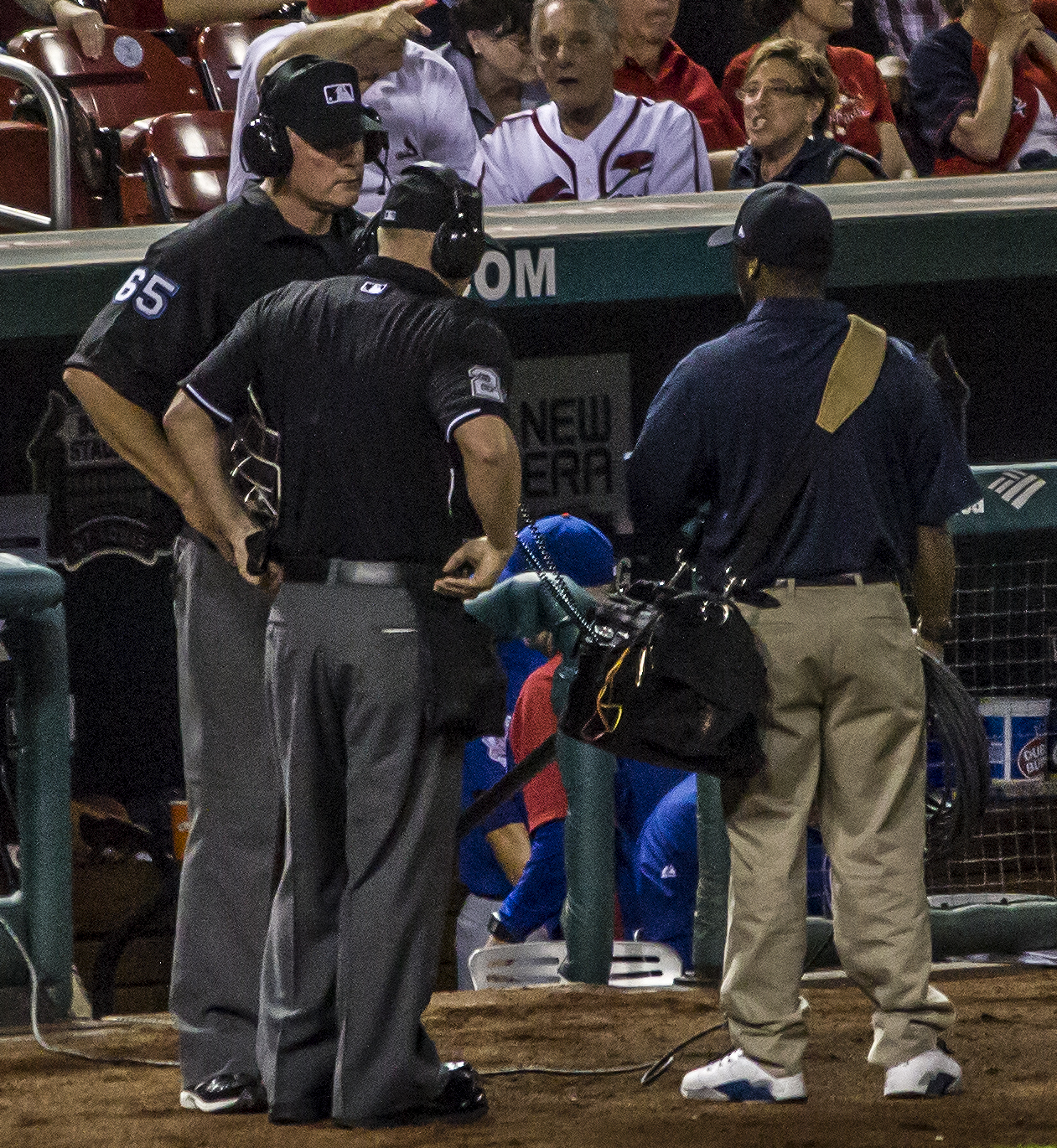
Umpires in St. Louis await the ruling.

Major League Baseball (MLB) uses instant replay review to allow league officials to review certain types of plays in order to determine the accuracy of the initial call of the umpires on the field. Reviews may be initiated either by a team's manager with limitations or by the umpires themselves. All instant replay reviews are examined by umpires at the Replay Command Center in New York City, who have the final decision as to whether to uphold or overturn the initial call.

MLB was the last of the four major North American professional sports leagues to implement an instant replay review system. Instant replay review was first implemented during the 2008 season. Under that system, only the umpire crew chief could initiate a review, and one or more members of the umpiring crew would review the video at the stadium and render the decision to uphold or overturn the call. Only boundary home run calls could be reviewed, either if the initial call was a home run but might not have been (e.g., spectator interference or a foul ball near the foul pole) or if the initial call was not a home run but might have been (e.g., the ball hit an object such as a railing beyond the outfield wall and then bounced back onto the field).

The current instant replay system was implemented in the 2014 season. Under the current system, each manager is allotted one challenge per game, with additional challenges granted only if the previous one was successful. From the eighth inning on, the umpire crew chief is allowed to initiate his own replay review. The umpire crew chief is also allowed to initiate a review during any inning if the play in question is a boundary home run call.

== Procedure ==
The following plays may be subjected to instant replay review:

- Home run or boundary calls, including placement of runners
- Fair/foul calls on balls hit into the outfield
- Force plays and tag plays
- Catch/trap calls on balls hit into the outfield, i.e., whether an outfielder cleanly caught a ball on the fly or trapped it just after it touched the ground
- Whether a runner passed a preceding runner
- Time plays, i.e., whether or not a run scored prior to the third out
- Missed bases
- Scorekeeping issues, including the count, number of outs, score, or substitutions
- Whether a batter was hit by a pitch
- Collisions at home plate (Rule 6.01(i))
- Tag-ups
- Interference on double plays
- Spectator interference

In addition, the crew chief can use replay to review the following issues at any time, which is not considered a challenge:

- The count, the number of outs, and the score
- Substitutions
- Batting out of turn
- Rules check

In cases where an appeal is required by rule (e.g. missed base, tag-up), an appeal must be made, and it is the call on the appeal that is reviewed.

To initiate a manager's challenge, a manager must either enter the field of play and verbally tell the umpire he will use his challenge, or call or signal the challenge from the top of the dugout, within 30 seconds after the end of the play. Teams are allowed to have a replay assistant in the booth watch the replay and talk with a coach via the dugout telephone to decide if the team should challenge the call. A player or coach in the dugout will signal to the manager whether or not to use the challenge. The manager must signal to hold play within 10 seconds after the end of the play in order to wait for his replay booth's decision.

When a play is reviewed, at least two umpires (including the crew chief) will go to an area behind home plate where they will meet a technician. The technician hands the umpires headsets where they can communicate with the umpires at the Replay Command Center in New York City. During the review, the replay may be displayed on the stadium video screen. Once the call is determined, the field technician will leave and the crew chief will signal the final call. If a manager enters the field of play to argue a reviewed call, he will be automatically ejected from the game.

After being reviewed, umpires will call one of three review outcomes. If the play is confirmed, the umpire found clear and convincing evidence that the original call was correct. If the play is overturned, the umpire found clear and convincing evidence that the original call was incorrect. If the umpire found no clear evidence to overturn the call, the call stands.

The replay review lasts no more than two minutes. The clock begins after what is being challenged is established by the crew chief. There are a few exceptions to this time limit however, including placement of runners, multiple challenges, technology issues, rules application, and director discretion.

Some plays are non-reviewable, so instant replay cannot be used. These plays include subjective calls, such as check swings, infield fly rule, and balls and strikes. Instead, as of the 2026 MLB season, balls and strikes are able to be challenged via the Automated Ball-Strike System. Other calls that are considered non-reviewable are trap plays (infield), foul tips, and mound visit count.

== History ==
Instant replay in MLB actually had been used once before in the 1999 season during a Florida Marlins home game at Pro Player Stadium. This was the first instance in which instant replay was utilized in Major League Baseball. While playing the St. Louis Cardinals, Cliff Floyd hit a ball off the top of the left-field scoreboard. Originally ruled a double and then ruled a home run, National League umpire Frank Pulli changed the call back to a double after consulting a television camera near the Marlins' dugout. The Cardinals won the game, 5-2, and the Marlins protested the use of the TV monitor. The National League Office declared that the umpires erred in using instant replay, and the American League Office concurred that instant replay was not to be used in the future. However, the Marlins' protest was denied on the grounds that it was a judgment call rather than a rules violation as such, and the play stood. MLB did not use instant replay again for almost a decade.

Major League Baseball instant replay was instituted on August 28, 2008, by commissioner Bud Selig. "I believe that the extraordinary technology that we now have merits the use of instant replay on a very limited basis," Selig said. "The system we have in place will ensure that the proper call is made on home run balls and will not cause a significant delay to the game."

Replay was used 123 times between August 28, 2008, and the conclusion of the 2010 season (with 48 of those instances resulting in overturned calls).

=== Official debut ===
Replay made its official, sanctioned MLB debut at Tropicana Field on September 3, 2008, after Alex Rodriguez of the New York Yankees hit a ball near the left-field foul pole that was initially ruled a home run by third base umpire Brian Runge. Tampa Bay Rays manager Joe Maddon and catcher Dioner Navarro argued that the ball was foul and asked for a review. After a conversation among the umpires, crew chief Charlie Reliford allowed the replay to take place and after review, upheld the home run call.

The first instance of an umpire's call being overturned by instant replay also occurred at Tropicana Field. On September 19, 2008, in the bottom of the 4th inning with two runners on base, Carlos Peña of the Rays hit the ball just over the fence in right field. The umpires originally ruled that there was spectator interference, but after several minutes of viewing replays, the umpires returned to the field and signaled it a home run, extending the Rays' lead to 9-0.

Aside from the two aforementioned reviews at Tampa Bay, review was used five additional times during the 2008 regular season: twice at Houston, and once each at Seattle, San Francisco, and Philadelphia.

=== Use of instant replay ===
On March 16, 2009, during the 2009 World Baseball Classic, instant replay was requested for the first time in the tournament's history at Dolphin Stadium to give Venezuela a home run against Puerto Rico. Crew chief Ed Rapuano stated in a postgame press conference that there was never any replay, because the "war room" in New York City was unable to send him a replay of the play in question due to technical difficulties. The umpires, two from the United States and two from Japan, then worked with a translator to make a final ruling. Three of the four umpires said they believed it was a home run, and when third-base umpire Hitoshi Watarida was asked by Rapuano if he was "110 percent sure" that it was a home run, Watarida said yes. Nearly 10 minutes after first entering the dugout, the umpires returned to the field and awarded the Venezuelan team with a home run.

Instant replay instead made its WBC debut during the 2013 World Baseball Classic, as umpires upheld a home run call during a Mexico vs. USA game.

On June 19, 2009, instant replay was used twice in a game for the first time, during a Detroit Tigers versus Milwaukee Brewers game.

On October 31, 2009, instant replay was used for the first time in a World Series. In the fourth inning of Game 3 of the World Series, Alex Rodriguez hit a ball that bounced off the camera in right field. Initially called as a double, the umpires reviewed the play, and determined that had the camera not been in its location, the ball probably would have left the park, and a home run was awarded to Rodriguez, making the score 3-2.

On June 1, 2011, Billy Butler of the Kansas City Royals hit a fly ball to left field in the bottom of the ninth inning of a scoreless game against the Los Angeles Angels of Anaheim. The ball hit off the fence over the left-field wall and skipped back onto the field. It was ruled a double and Jeff Francoeur held at third. Manager Ned Yost argued that it was a home run. After review, the umpires accordingly ruled a home run, granting the Royals a 2-0 victory. This was the second walk-off home run reviewed by instant replay in MLB history.

On August 18, 2011, Justin Morneau of the Minnesota Twins hit a deep fly ball to right field that appeared to go just to the right side of the foul pole for a foul ball in a game against the New York Yankees. However, the umpires immediately called it a home run. Yankees manager Joe Girardi came out to argue the call and ask for a review. The umpires reviewed and ruled that the ball did indeed go past the right side of the foul pole, thus calling it a foul ball. Twins manager Ron Gardenhire came out to argue the call and was ejected from the game by home plate umpire Brian O'Nora for arguing a decision to change a call after looking at instant replay, which pursuant to MLB rules, results in an automatic ejection.

On September 4, 2011, Hunter Pence of the Philadelphia Phillies hit a fly ball to deep right field. Originally ruled a live ball, instant replay showed Florida Marlins right fielder Bryan Petersen was interfered with by multiple fans during his opportunity to catch a ball, under Rule 2.00 INTERFERENCE (d)(1) and (2). After instant replay review, first base umpire and crew chief Joe West ruled Pence out under the provisions of spectator interference, Rule 3.16, and sent Phillies baserunner Ryan Howard back to first base. For the second time in less than a month, a manager was ejected arguing the instant replay decision: Charlie Manuel was ejected and elected to play the game under protest. On September 7, 2011, MLB VP of Baseball Operations Joe Torre denied the first ever protest associated with authorized instant replay usage.

=== Changes for 2014 ===
Instant replay was not expanded in 2012, and Torre confirmed that instant replay would again not be expanded in time for Opening Day 2013, putting off plans for another season. On August 15, 2013, Major League Baseball announced that it would expand its video review process for the 2014 season, granting managers one challenge over the first six innings of games and two from the seventh inning until the end of the game. Calls that are challenged would be reviewed by a crew in MLB headquarters in New York City, who make the final ruling.

As part of the 2014 collective bargaining agreement between MLB's owners and players union (MLBPA), and approval by the umpires union (WUA), two additional elements were added to the replay rules. Instant replay was expanded to include fair and foul calls and balls that are caught or trapped by the player catching the ball. It also expanded interference reviews beyond the home run boundary to all walls.

==== 2013 Arizona Fall League testing ====
Following the conclusion of the 2013 World Series, MLB announced it would test expanded instant replay as proposed for 2014 for a week's slate of games in the Arizona Fall League. During the second inning of the Tuesday, November 5 Solar Sox-Rafters game played at HoHoKam Stadium, first base umpire Sean Barber ruled batter C. J. Cron out at first base on a close play. Manager Bill Richardson approached plate umpire Hal Gibson to challenge the play, initiating the first video review conducted by off-field umpires and relayed via headset to the plate umpire; Barber's out call was upheld after the review. In total, four plays were reviewed during the debut game, with instant replay affirming the umpire's on-field call all four times.

The first overturned call occurred during November 6's Rafters-Scorpions game when umpires used replay to reverse an out call on a stolen base attempt. The game also featured a rare multi-replay challenge, as video review upheld two umpiring calls in one play: batter Kyle Kubitza's touch of second base as well as his slide into third base ahead of a tag.

In total, fifteen calls were challenged with three overturned upon instant replay review, resulting in a 20% overturn rate.

=== Expanded replay approved for 2014 ===
To accommodate the anticipated expansion of instant replay, MLB promoted seven minor league umpires to the full-time major league staff on January 14, 2014. Two days later, on January 16, MLB officially announced the approval of expanded instant replay for use during the 2014 season, whose terms were modified after negotiations with the MLBPA and WUA. According to the terms, managers were allotted one challenge per game (two if the first challenge resulted in an overturned call) while the umpiring crew chief was empowered to initiate a review in the seventh inning and beyond. The umpires were also allowed to review a home run call at any time. Once a call was challenged or an umpire requested a video review, fellow umpires in New York's Replay Command Center watched video of the play in question using the "indisputable video evidence" standard when deciding whether to overturn a call. The following plays were reviewable under the system:

- Ground-rule doubles
- Fan interference calls
- Boundary calls (managers may not, however, challenge home run or potential home run calls)
- Force plays at all bases, except whether a middle infielder touched second base during the attempt to "turn" a double play
- Tag plays on the base paths—whether a runner was tagged or whether the runner touched a base (an appeal is still required ahead of the latter)
- Fair/foul calls on balls hit into the outfield
- Catch/trap calls on balls hit into the outfield
- Time plays (whether or not a run scored prior to the third out)
- Whether a runner passed a preceding runner
- Scorekeeping issues, including the count, number of outs, score or substitutions

Judgment calls not specified above, including, but not limited to, pitches called ball or strike, obstruction, interference, the infield fly rule, and checked swings are not reviewable.

On March 31, 2014, the first instant replay challenge under the new system occurred when Chicago Cubs manager Rick Renteria challenged a potential double play in the top of the fifth inning against the Pittsburgh Pirates, disputing the call on the field that pitcher Jeff Samardzija was out at first. The umpires confirmed the call on the field, and the Cubs lost the challenge. From announcement of the challenge to confirmation of the call, the process took 1 minute, 40 seconds, longer than MLB's hope of 60 to 90 seconds per review. Later that day, the first successful challenge took place when Atlanta Braves manager Fredi González challenged the call of a Ryan Braun single. It was overturned to an out in a review that took 58 seconds, although the Braves lost the game to the Milwaukee Brewers 2-0; coincidentally, former Brewers owner and MLB commissioner Bud Selig was in attendance for the first successful challenge. Moments later, the aforementioned Cubs–Pirates game had the second overturned call (and the first in extra innings) when Emilio Bonifacio was called safe on a pickoff attempt by Bryan Morris. Pirates manager Clint Hurdle successfully challenged the call, which was said to have influenced the outcome of the game, a 1-0 Pirates victory. Finally, the first umpire-initiated review took place in a game between the Oakland Athletics and Cleveland Indians when umpire Mike Winters wanted to confirm that Oakland catcher John Jaso did not unnecessarily block the plate as Michael Brantley attempted to score.

As of the 2014 All-Star Break, instant replay was generally well received by managers, players, and umpires. Managers challenged 606 calls, or an average of one every 2.35 games, of which 52% were overturned. Including situations where umpires requested the Replay Operations Center to review a call, 47.7% of calls were overturned. However, MLB informally allows up to 30 seconds to have the team's video coordinator signal a call to the manager. When situations where the manager comes out on the field to await a decision from a team video coordinator are included, MLB estimates the percentage of calls overturned decreases to 21%. The average replay review takes one minute, fifty seconds, which is higher than MLB's original goal of 90 seconds per review.

One side effect has been the addition of 12 new umpires—the most since 1999—to MLB's staff, due to the need to staff the Replay Command Center with two crews. However, statistics show that umpiring quality has remained constant despite the additions, with four out of the top seven umpires with reversals those who have umpired more than 1,600 games.

=== Changes for 2015 ===
In 2015, many changes regarding instant replay were made. Managers could invoke instant replay from the dugout and were no longer be required to approach the calling umpire to challenge a call. Managers could hold play from the top step of the dugout by signaling to players and the home plate umpire that they are considering a challenge. A decision could be communicated verbally or with a hand signal. To challenge an inning-ending call, managers are required to leave the dugout immediately in order to hold the defensive team on the field.

Tag-up plays became reviewable, to help determine if a player touched the base before continuing or not. A manager now retains his challenge after every call that is overturned, as opposed to the 2014 standard that allowed a challenge to be retained only after the first overturned call. A manager must use a challenge in order to review whether a play at home plate included a violation of the rule governing home plate collisions. However, in the event that a manager is out of challenges after the start of the seventh inning, the crew chief may still choose to review whether there was a violation of the rule. During postseason games, regular season tiebreaker games, and the All-Star Game, managers are given two challenges per game. Instant replay was not utilized during 2015 spring training, but it was in place for exhibition games at Major League ballparks prior to the start of the 2015 regular season.

== See also ==
- Automated Ball-Strike System, which, as of 2025, relies on player challenges
- Check Swing Challenge
- Bill Duplissea, known for his effectiveness in challenging calls for the Kansas City Royals
