= Bill Duplissea =

Bill Duplissea may refer to:

- Bill Duplissea (politician) (1950–2020), Republican member of the California State Assembly
- Bill Duplissea (baseball) (born 1977), American former baseball player and replay coordinator
