= Shagging (baseball) =

To catch fly balls in baseball outside a game

In baseball, shagging is the act of catching fly balls in the outfield outside the context of an actual baseball game. This is most commonly done by pitchers during batting practice before a game, where they assist their hitting teammates by catching or picking up their batted baseballs and throwing them back to the pitching area in the infield. Batboys also help shagging, and it is reportedly considered a great honor among batboys to be asked to do this. This pre-game activity is widely disliked by pitchers, who argue that it does not benefit them at all, since it drains their energy and actually increases the risk of stiffness in the lower back and leg as a result of prolonged standing. In response to these claims, several teams have exempted pitchers from having to shag. In the Nippon Professional Baseball (NPB) league, teams pay groups specifically assembled to shag fly balls in place of pitchers, and the Los Angeles Angels of Anaheim recruit local firefighters in Arizona to do the job when the team plays in the Cactus League during spring training.

== Dangers ==
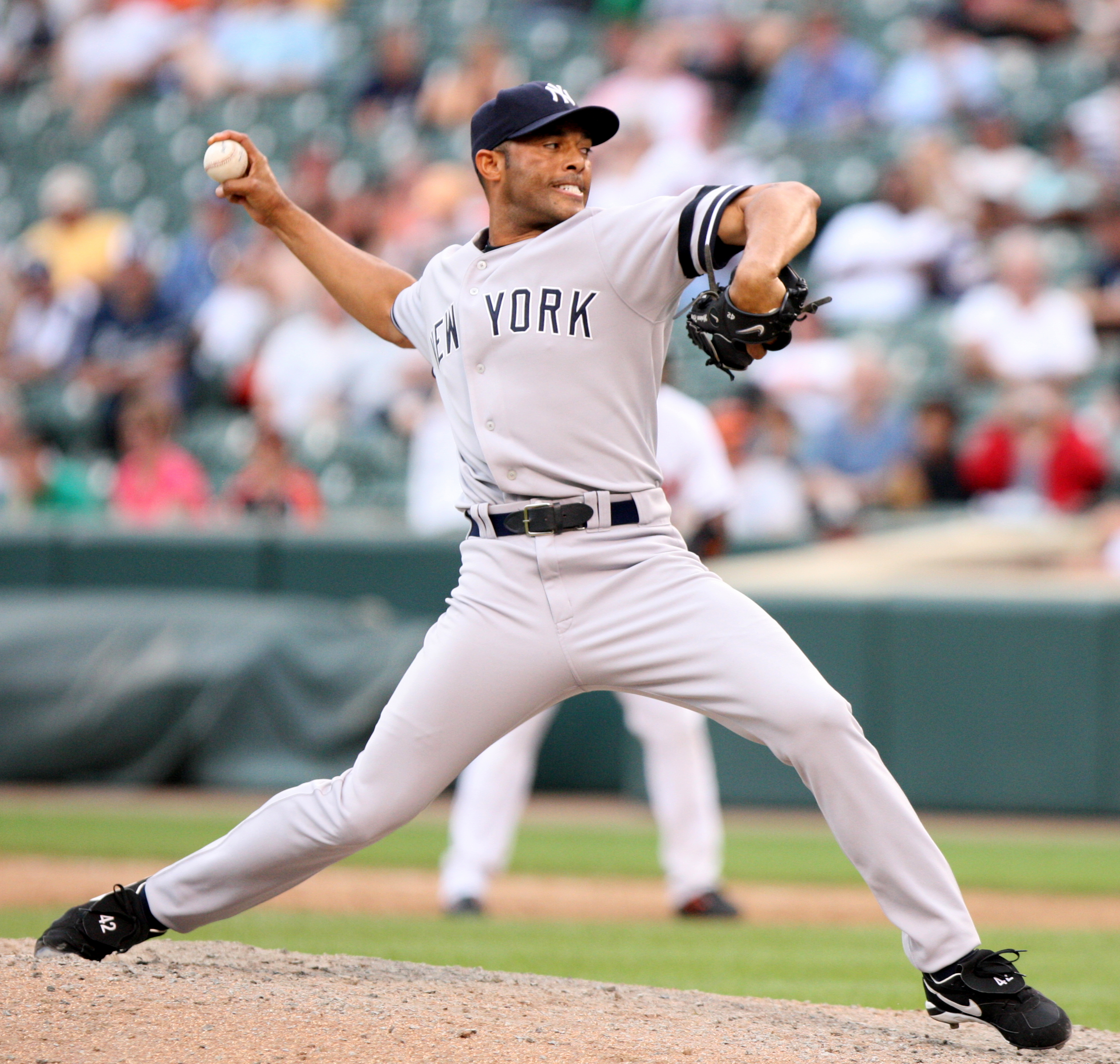
All-time saves leader Mariano Rivera suffered a season-ending injury in 2012 while shagging a fly ball at Kauffman Stadium.

Although shagging is not considered to be dangerous, several freak injuries have occurred as a result of engaging in it. In 1943,Paul Waner accidentally gashed his foot while shagging a fly ball in a game against the Pittsburgh Pirates, his former team. This was probably due to Waner being nearsighted and his refusal to wear glasses; thus, he "played the outfield by ear." Nearly four decades later, Jerry Reuss was handed the honor of pitching on Opening Day in 1981, but suffered an injury to his calf while shagging for his teammates. He was replaced by unheralded rookie Fernando Valenzuela, who went on to win his next 8 consecutive decisions.

Other players who have suffered serious injuries due to shagging include Mark Fidrych and Brendan Donnelly. Fidrych suffered a left knee injury after tearing cartilage in 1977 spring training, starting a downward spiral in his career. Donnelly ended up breaking his nose while shagging, resulting in him losing half of his blood and necessitating three operations.

Mariano Rivera, the all-time leader in saves, suffered arguably the most well-known injury from shagging on May 3, 2012. While helping out in pre-game batting practice, Rivera attempted to catch a fly ball from Jayson Nix when he twisted his knee on the warning track of Kauffman Stadium and fell to the ground. An MRI scan revealed he had torn his anterior cruciate ligament (ACL) and part of his meniscus. This prematurely ended his season and led to fears that this could potentially be a career-ending injury. Rivera was able to come back and pitch for the 2013 season, his final season in the major leagues before retiring.

Despite the seriousness of Rivera's injuries, pitchers from across Major League Baseball (MLB) who engaged in shagging flies during batting practice said they would not drop the activity or modify their training routine. These included James Shields and J. J. Putz, along with 2012 Cy Young Award winners R. A. Dickey and David Price. Furthermore, several MLB managers at the time—namely Dale Sveum, Joe Maddon, Jim Leyland and Terry Collins—confirmed they would not order their pitchers to stop shagging.

== See also ==
- Pepper (baseball)
