= Automated Ball-Strike System =

Baseball pitch locator

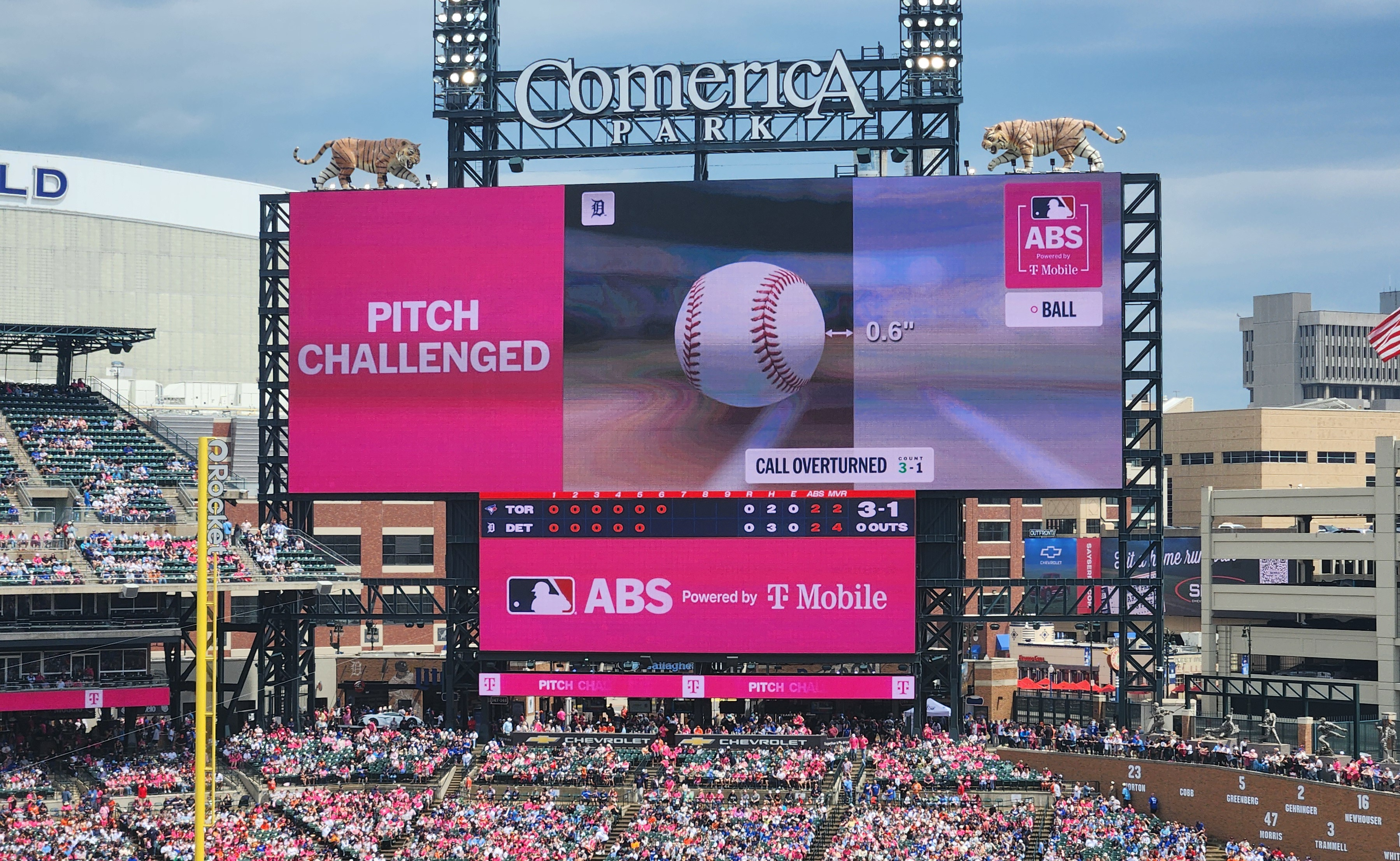
Major League Baseball's ABS system in use during a game at Comerica Park in 2026

The Automated Ball-Strike System (ABS) is a system that automates the interpretation of whether pitches are in the strike zone in baseball games. It is currently used by the KBO League in South Korea, by the Mexican Baseball League, and by Minor League Baseball (MiLB) and Major League Baseball (MLB) in the United States and Canada. It has been implemented in two ways: as a challenge system, where players may challenge umpire calls of balls and strikes, and as a fully automated system.

== History ==
=== Minor League Baseball ===
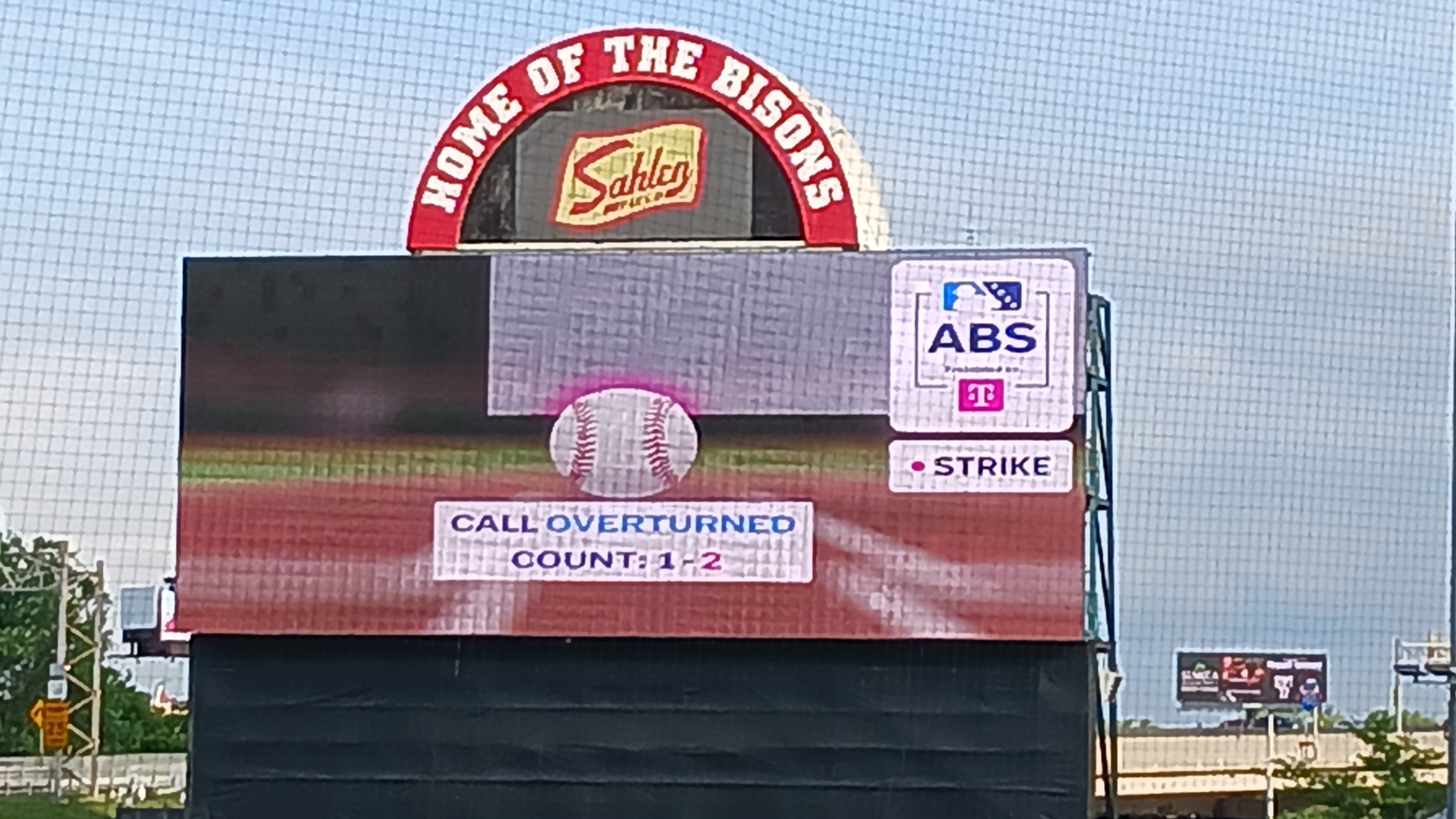
Minor League Baseball's ABS system in use during a game at Sahlen Field in 2025

The independent Atlantic League first used ABS, nicknamed "robot umpires", during its 2019 all-star game. Umpires used earpieces to receive ball-strike calls using TrackMan technology. Umpires could make a call based on the automated message, or could make their own call if the automated system malfunctioned or registered a call with which the umpire disagreed.

The Arizona Fall League began using ABS during its 2021 season. The technology drew complaints from players and fans for its treatment of breaking balls as strikes even when they break and drop out of the strike zone. Human umpires were obligated to make a call based on ABS, and players could be ejected if they contested a call, as with all ball-strike calls.

The Florida State League, a low-A league in Florida, used ABS in its 2021 season. The Major League Baseball Umpires Association (MLBUA) agreed to cooperate and assist if MLB commissioner Rob Manfred decided to use ABS at the major league level, as part of the MLBUA's contract with MLB in 2020.

Five Triple-A baseball stadiums used ABS in 2022, and the system expanded to all stadiums at that level in 2023. In 2023, Triple-A baseball used ABS with and without a challenge system; without a challenge system, human umpires relayed automated calls, and with the system, an automated call would be used only when a team requested a challenge. In 2024, Triple-A teams that played six-game series first used ABS without a challenge system for the first three games, and with challenges for the latter three; starting on June 25, MLB announced that only the challenge system would be used. In 2024, 51% of challenges in Triple-A games were successful.

=== KBO League ===
South Korea's KBO League started to use ABS in its 2024 season. Unlike in MLB, KBO uses ABS to call balls and strikes automatically.

Researchers found that this method provides more overall consistency than regular human umpiring. Results from the league showed that ABS negatively affected high status hitters' performance, and did not affect high status pitchers performance.

After ABS arrived in the KBO, star hitters struck out more, walked less and reached base far less often that lower-status hitters. The decline however only appeared in strike zone stats including walk rate (BB%), not broader hitting measures like raw power. A placebo test however pointed the other way. When it was presented that ABS arrived a year early, high-status hitters were trending upwards compared to their peers, arguing against a natural slump. Star pitchers showed no such effect, mainly because pitchers showed fewer opportunities for a measurable decline.

=== Major League Baseball ===
ABS was in place for Spring Training before the 2025 MLB season. Thirteen Spring Training ballparks, used as home fields by 19 clubs, are equipped with ABS technology. MLB implemented ABS as a challenge system; human umpires make initial calls, which pitchers, catchers, and batters may challenge.

MLB used ABS for the 2025 All-Star Game, with a similar configuration to spring training: each team had two challenges, which could be requested by the pitcher, catcher, or hitter immediately after a call. Cal Raleigh, the first player to request an ABS challenge in an MLB All-Star Game, successfully challenged the umpire's ball call of a pitch he caught from Tarik Skubal, resulting in Manny Machado being called out on strikes. Jacob Wilson was the first batter to challenge a call, successfully getting a pitch from MacKenzie Gore changed from a strike to a ball.

In September 2025, MLB's competition committee approved use of ABS beginning with the 2026 season, with similar processes to those used in Spring Training and the All-Star Game. Each team starts with two challenges, retains a challenge if it is successful, and may receive additional challenges in extra innings. The league refers to the system as the "Automated Ball-Strike (ABS) Challenge System, powered by T-Mobile".

On March 25, 2026, Opening Day, New York Yankees shortstop José Caballero made the first ABS challenge in an MLB regular season game, challenging Bill Miller's strike call on Logan Webb's first pitch to him in the fourth inning. Caballero's challenge was unsuccessful, and the strike call was upheld. The following day, Francisco Álvarez, catcher for the New York Mets, made the first successful ABS challenge in an MLB regular season game, after he challenged a ball call on a pitch by Freddy Peralta. The call was changed to a strike, resulting in the batter, Oneil Cruz, striking out.

During the 2026 regular season, there were 10,557 ABS challenges, an average of 4.35 per game, of which 5,686 (54%) led to overturned ball–strike calls. Catchers were the most successful at making challenges, achieving an overturned call 59% of the time, followed by batters (49%) and pitchers (40%). William Contreras, a catcher for the Milwaukee Brewers, led all MLB catchers with 185 challenges, and also led the league in successful challenges, with 105. J. T. Realmuto of the Philadelphia Phillies had 81% of his challenges as a catcher result in an overturn, the highest rate among catchers with at least 75 challenges. Among umpires whose calls were challenged at least 100 times, Andy Fletcher had the highest overturn rate: 80 of 121 challenges (66.1%) resulted in an overturned call.

In the second game of the 2026 National League Wild Card Series, on September 30, 2026, Realmuto and Andrew Painter, the catcher and pitcher, respectively, for the Phillies, successfully challenged a ball call by umpire Adam Beck on an 0–2 pitch to Dominic Smith of the Atlanta Braves in the bottom of the 10th inning, resulting in Smith striking out and the Phillies winning the game, 4–3, to tie the best-of-three series at one game apiece. This was the first MLB postseason game to end on an ABS challenge.

On October 4, 2026, during Game 2 of the National League Division Series, home plate umpire Lance Barrett had 10 ball–strike calls overturned after ABS challenges, setting the Major League Baseball record for a nine-inning game. The teams combined to go 10-for-12 on challenges against Barrett's strike zone, with Milwaukee overturning six calls and San Diego overturning four.

The system made its debut in the 2026 World Series between the Tampa Bay Rays and the eventual champion Milwaukee Brewers. World Series MVP, William Contreras, went 10-for-13 on correct ABS challenges in the series.

=== College baseball ===
In May 2026, the NCAA baseball rules committee approved a request by the Southeastern Conference (SEC) for permission to use ABS as part of its conference tournament; it used nearly identical rules to MLB, except with teams beginning with three challenges instead of two.

On May 19, 2026, Mississippi catcher Austin Fawley made the first ABS challenge in a college baseball game, challenging a ball call on a pitch by Missouri pitcher Will Libbert in the top of the first inning. The challenge was unsuccessful, and the call stood. Overall, balls and strikes challenges were overturned about 56% of the time. Most challenges were initiated by catchers, and the catchers were the most accurate with 63% of catcher challenges getting overturned. Florida Gators catcher Karson Bowen was the most successful with a 90% success rate, followed by Missouri's Mateo Serna with an 88% success rate.

Batters were much less successful in challenging calls using ABS with an overall success rate at about 40%. There is no clear standout for the most successful hitter, as 12 hitters went 1 for 1 on challenges including Arkansas' Ryder Helfrick and LSU's Brayden Simpson. Georgia catcher Daniel Jackson was the only hitter to challenge more than one pitch, and he was 1 for 2 in overturning calls. Pitchers did not challenge a single pitch during the SEC tournament. Umpire Eric Goshay had the most calls overturned with 5 of his 6 challenged calls go against him, while Kevin Sweeney had only 3 of 13 challenged calls go against him.

In July of 2026, the ABS system was approved by the NCAA for use throughout college baseball in the 2027 season. Schools would not be required to adopt the system, and would only be put into place at stadiums with Trackman or Hawkeye tracking. The request process would stay the same with the tap of the head by a hitter, catcher or pitcher. Conferences and teams with the proper equipment listed could use it without separate experimental approval.

The format of challenges would likely follow that of the SEC tournament, and they include similar details. Only pitchers, catchers and hitters are permitted to challenge balls and strikes. Each team starts with three challenges per game, retaining their challenge if they win. A team with no challenges left will receive one challenge at the start of each extra inning if applicable. The initial rollout of ABS will likely be uneven due to the lack of technology in some stadiums.

=== Mexican Baseball League ===
The Mexican Baseball League (Spanish: Liga Mexicana de Béisbol, or LMB) began transitioning to a fully automated ball–strike system during its 2026 season. Starting with games played on May 22, 2026, a human umpire behind home plate relays ABS calls. Players cannot challenge these calls. During the 2026 LMB season's preseason, and for roughly the first month of the regular season, umpires called balls and strikes themselves, and batters, pitchers, and catchers were allowed to challenge calls, using a process similar to MLB's.

== Mechanics ==
As implemented by MLB, ABS uses Hawk-Eye camera technology, and a private 5G network by T-Mobile to transmit data. T-Mobile also serves as presenting sponsor for reviews. Reviews are shown on screens in stadiums and on broadcasts for home viewers.

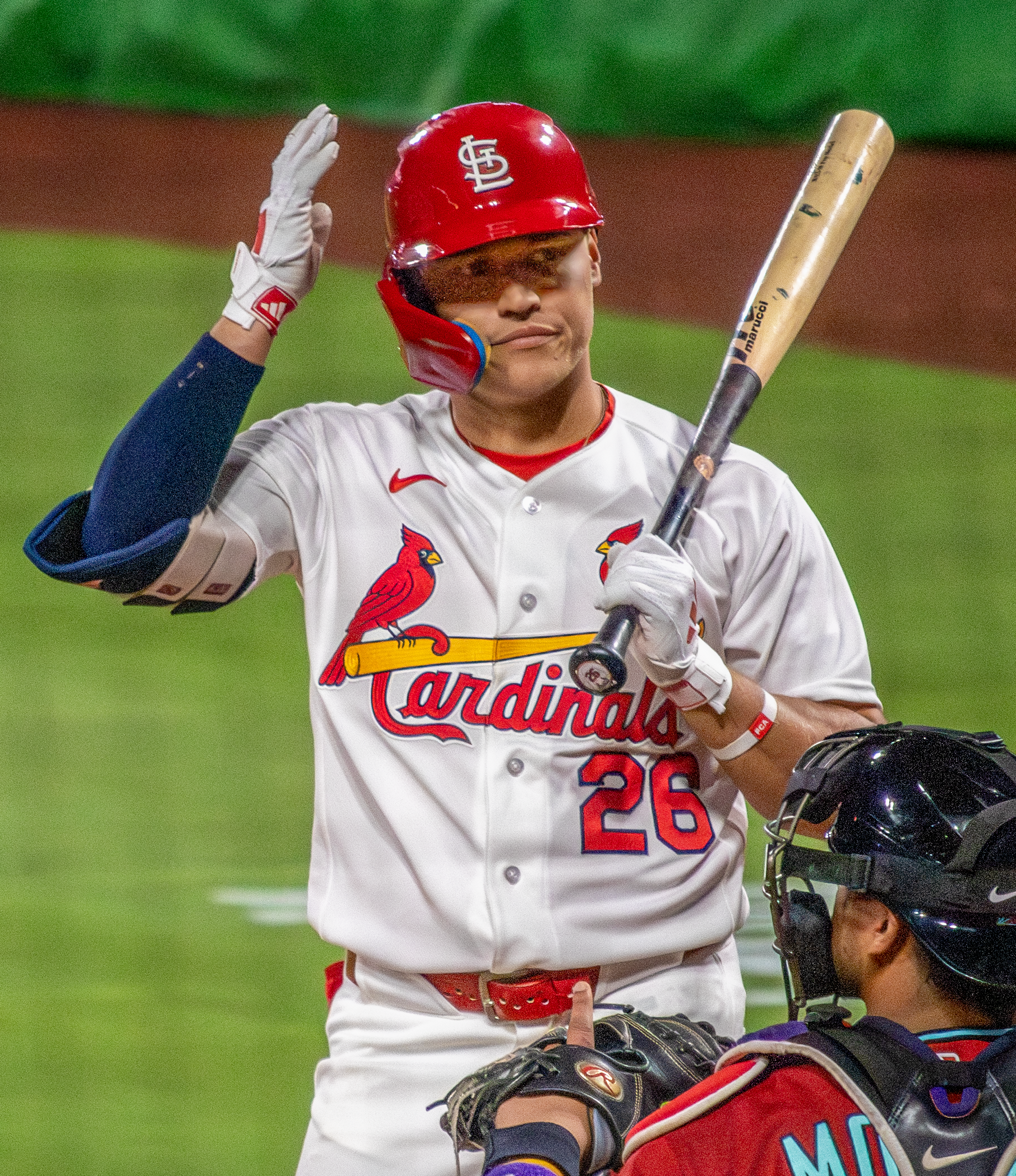
JJ Wetherholt of the Cardinals challenges a call, 2026.

MLB has experimented with the size of the strike zone, a three-dimensional space defined in the official rules of Major League Baseball, as used by ABS. The league started with a width of 19 inches (480 mm) in 2022, then decreased it to 17 inches (430 mm), the same width as home plate. The top of the zone was 51% of a batter's height in 2022 and 2023, then raised to 53.5% in 2024 after pitchers' complaints. The bottom of the strike zone was originally set at 28% of the batter's height, and has been 27% since 2022. ABS's use of height in its strike zone led the league to measure players more precisely, without manipulation by team personnel, in 2026; of the 430 hitters on Opening Day rosters in 2026, 225 had listed heights at least 1 inch (25 mm) shorter than in 2024 or 2025. ABS makes its decision when the ball is at the midpoint of the plate, 8.5 inches (220 mm) from the front and back, despite MLB rules stating that a pitch is a strike if it crosses any part of a 3D solid with home plate as its base. The ABS strike zone does not change based on the batter's stance.

In MLB, only the batter, pitcher, or catcher may challenge a ball or strike call, doing so by tapping his cap or helmet immediately after an umpire's call. Each team gets two challenges per game, but loses a challenge if an original call is upheld after review. In extra innings, a team that begins an inning with no challenges will receive one challenge to use or carry forward; it will not receive additional challenges if it has at least one at the start of an extra inning. Players must make a decision on their own, without assistance from other players or team personnel, such as coaches or managers. Unlike instant replay challenges, managers may not challenge a ball-strike call. Challenges are not permitted while a position player is pitching.

ABS reports pitch locations in increments of 0.1 inches (2.5 mm), although some players have expressed concerns about the system's margin of error. MLB officials told The Athletic that the league has 95 percent confidence that ABS would a report a pitch to within 0.39 inches (9.9 mm), and 99 percent confidence that the location would be within 0.48 inches (12 mm) of its recorded position. During 2026 spring training games, the league said that the median margin of error on any given pitch was about 0.16 inches (4.1 mm). MLB's internal evaluations of umpire accuracy use a buffer zone on the periphery of the strike zone, in which calls remain unchanged due to measurement uncertainty, but ABS has no buffer zone.

In MLB, an ABS challenge typically takes less than 15 seconds. Through the first two and a half weeks of the 2026 season, a nine-inning game took an average of 2 hours, 42 minutes to complete, up from 2:38 in the prior season, but still much shorter than 3:10 in 2021, the last MLB season without the pitch clock.

== Reaction ==
MLB started testing ABS because of fans' strong feelings about inaccurate umpire calls of balls and strikes, which can affect the outcome of games. According to an MLB poll in 2024, 61% of team personnel (including players) and 47% of fans preferred a challenge system for ball-strike calls, 28% of team personnel and 30% of fans preferred not to use ABS at all, and 11% of team personnel and 23% of fans wanted full automation.

Players and managers have sometimes objected to ball-strike calls even after an ABS review, but doing so still risks ejection from the game. "Nobody complains about anything anymore with the strike zone because there's nothing to complain about," said Toby Gardenhire, manager of the St. Paul Saints. Players observed that catchers could no longer frame pitches to try to get strike calls on pitches outside the zone. Players in Triple-A have typically saved their challenges for higher-leverage situations; more than 8% of pitches on a 3–2 count were challenged, whereas only 1.6% of first pitches were. "Your heart rate goes through the roof", said Michael Toglia of the Colorado Rockies, about calling a challenge during his time in Triple-A. Tyler Glasnow of the Los Angeles Dodgers said that ABS challenges were "the most fun part of the game" during a rehab assignment in Triple-A, because when a player challenged a call successfully, they felt "vindicated".

After the first weekend of the 2026 MLB season, Jeff Passan wrote, "Not only does ABS work, it makes the game better." Fans in stadiums and television broadcasters had enthusiastically embraced the challenge system, leading Passan to wonder whether it should be used for all ball–strike calls in the future.

Former MLB umpires have suggested that current umpires would adjust their ball–strike calls in anticipation of ABS challenges. "As an umpire, what you're trying to do is not get overturned", said Dale Scott, a retired MLB umpire. Joe West, another retired umpire, expressed concerns with ABS's accuracy. Retired umpire Jim Joyce called ABS "the best scenario right now", because it is aiming to get more calls correct, and because it is used as a challenge system, not as a fully automated pitch calling system.

In minor leagues and in MLB, the walk rate has increased significantly after ABS was introduced. MLB's walk rate early in the 2026 season was at 9.9% of plate appearances, up from the typical 8% to 9%, and on pace for the highest walk rate since the mound was lowered in 1969. Hitters began the 2026 MLB season by swinging on 46.2% of pitches, down from 47.2% to 47.8% in prior seasons, and on pace for the lowest swing rate in a 162-game season since 2014.

== See also ==
- Check Swing Challenge
- Instant replay in Major League Baseball
- Hawk-Eye
- Decision Review System
