= Scott Cursi =

American bullpen catcher (born 1971)

Tampa Bay Rays
- Bullpen catcher
- Born: November 30 1971 (age 54–55); Pickerington, Ohio
- Bats: Right Throws: Right

Teams
- Tampa Bay Rays (1999–present)

Scott Cursi is the clubhouse assistant and former bullpen catcher for the Tampa Bay Rays baseball team.

== Career ==
He played as a catcher at Pickerington High School in Ohio and Seminole Community College, where he later served as an assistant while taking classes at University of Central Florida. He took a summer job as a bullpen catcher for the Chicago Cubs' Double-A Southern League affiliate, which later became the Orlando Rays under the Tampa Bay Devil Rays (now the Tampa Bay Rays) organization. Cursi served as Orlando's bullpen catcher for three seasons, from 1996 to 1998,.

In 1999, Larry Rothschild, then Tampa Bay manager, offered Cursi a job as bullpen catcher on the recommendation of Orlando manager Bruce Kimm. Cursi began catching in Tampa Bay's bullpen on Easter Sunday in 1999, working home games while he completed his college degree, before becoming the full-time bullpen catcher later that season. Cursi went to the 2009 Major League Baseball All-Star Game with the Rays' coaching staff, as Tampa Bay was the defending American League champions. There, Cursi warmed up pitchers and caught two rounds of the Home Run Derby.

Cursi previously coached at Bishop Waterson High School in Columbus, Ohio for four years, following his high school graduation in 1989.

== Off the field ==
Cursi graduated from University of Central Florida with a degree in physical education. He and his wife Stephanie live in St. Petersburg, Florida with their son, Noah. Cursi also works as an umpire for Little League games in Pinellas County.
