= Check Swing Challenge =

Baseball umpiring assistance

The Check Swing Challenge system is a system used in baseball to automate the determination of whether a batter fully swung their bat at a pitch, or instead checked their swing. It was first used in the Arizona Fall League, a U.S. minor league, in 2024, and has been introduced to other minor leagues since then.

== History ==
In baseball, umpires determine whether a batter swung at a pitch. In the official rules of Major League Baseball (MLB), no definitions exist for "swing" or "checked swing". An umpire's judgment determines whether a batter "struck at" a pitch. If the home plate umpire adjudges that a batter did not strike at a pitch outside the strike zone, they call the pitch a ball, and the catcher or defensive manager may ask for an appeal to the first-base or third-base umpire. Instant replay is used for television broadcasts, but cannot be used to challenge a check swing ruling.

Beginning in 2024, the Arizona Fall League (AFL) began a proof of concept test of the Check Swing Challenge system, using the same Hawk-Eye technology that is used by the AFL for the Automated Ball-Strike System (ABS). The initial test was at Salt River Fields at Talking Stick, home of the Salt River Rafters, an AFL team which includes players from the rosters of five MLB clubs. The system began to be used by the Florida State League (FSL), a single-A league, in 2025, and by the Pacific Coast League (PCL), a triple-A league, in 2026.

Rob Manfred, the commissioner of MLB, said that he was waiting to test the Check Swing Challenge system in spring training until after clubs have become accustomed to the ABS system, which was tested in spring training in 2025, and later introduced to the regular season in 2026. Manfred said in 2026 that the Check Swing Challenge would be available in MLB no sooner than in 2028.

Game 2 of the 2026 World Series ended with a strikeout by Yandy Díaz of the Tampa Bay Rays on a checked swing. Home plate umpire Jim Wolf initially ruled that Díaz had not swung, which would have resulted in a walk, but Milwaukee Brewers catcher William Contreras appealed to first base umpire James Hoye, who disagreed with Wolf, and Díaz was called out. During a replay of the swing, MLB on Fox play-by-play announcer Joe Davis said that there was a need for a system to review checked swing calls.

== Mechanics ==
As with ABS, the Check Swing Challenge system operates on a challenge basis: umpires make an initial call on the field, which may be changed on appeal, and the umpire's call may then be challenged by a pitcher, hitter, or catcher. As defined by the Check Swing Challenge system, a check swing is a swing in which the bat stays within a 45-degree angle from home plate, the same angle as the foul lines. In 2026, at the same time as triple-A baseball introduced the automated Check Swing Challenge system in the PCL, umpires in the International League, another triple-A league, were instructed to use the 45-degree threshold for their own check swing calls, creating a control group for the experiment with automation.

In the AFL, each team receives two challenges. If a team has used both of these challenges before the ninth inning, it receives an additional challenge in the ninth. In the FSL, each team receives one challenge, and retains the challenge if it is successful in getting a call overturned. In the PCL, each team starts with two challenges, and may use a challenge on either a ball–strike call or a swing–no swing call, but not both on the same pitch.

== Impact ==
The Check Swing Challenge system is expected to codify, for the first time in MLB's history, what defines a swing. Umpires in the distant past had ruled almost any incomplete swing to be a checked swing, whereas by 2025, MLB said that umpires called swings and no-swings equally at 18 degrees.

According to MLB, the system resulted in a 3% reduction in strikeouts in the FSL, leading to more balls in play. In the PCL, in 2026, the whiff (swing-and-miss) rate dropped by 2.6 percentage points on curveballs, sliders, sweepers, and knuckleballs when batters could challenge checked swing calls. The whiff rate fell by 3.6 percentage points on change-ups, splitters, and screwballs. Baseball insiders had generally positive impressions of the Check Swing Challenge system, expressing optimism that it could reduce baseball's rising strikeout rates.
