= Román Rodríguez =

Venezuelan baseball player and scout (born 1966)

Los Angeles Angels
- Infielder / Bullpen Catcher
- Born: March 30, 1969 (age 55); San Mateo, Venezuela
- Bats: Right Throws: Right

Teams
- As coach: Kansas City Royals (1997–2000); Boston Red Sox (2001); New York Yankees (2002–2016)

Román Rodríguez (born March 30, 1966) is a scout for the Los Angeles Angels.

== Career ==
Rodríguez was signed as a non-drafted free agent in 1988 by the Pittsburgh Pirates and spent eight years in their minor league system. Upon concluding his playing career, Rodríguez was hired by the Kansas City Royals from 1997 until 2000 as bullpen catcher. In 2001, he took a job in the same role with the Boston Red Sox. In 2002, he became a part of the New York Yankees staff, as a bullpen catcher and assisting with the charting of pitches during games. After the 2016 season, Rodríguez joined the Los Angeles Angels as a scout.

== Personal life ==
Rodríguez resides in Bradenton, Florida with his wife Carminia, whom he married on Valentine's Day in 2004, and their daughter.
