= Bullpen catcher =

Coaching position in baseball

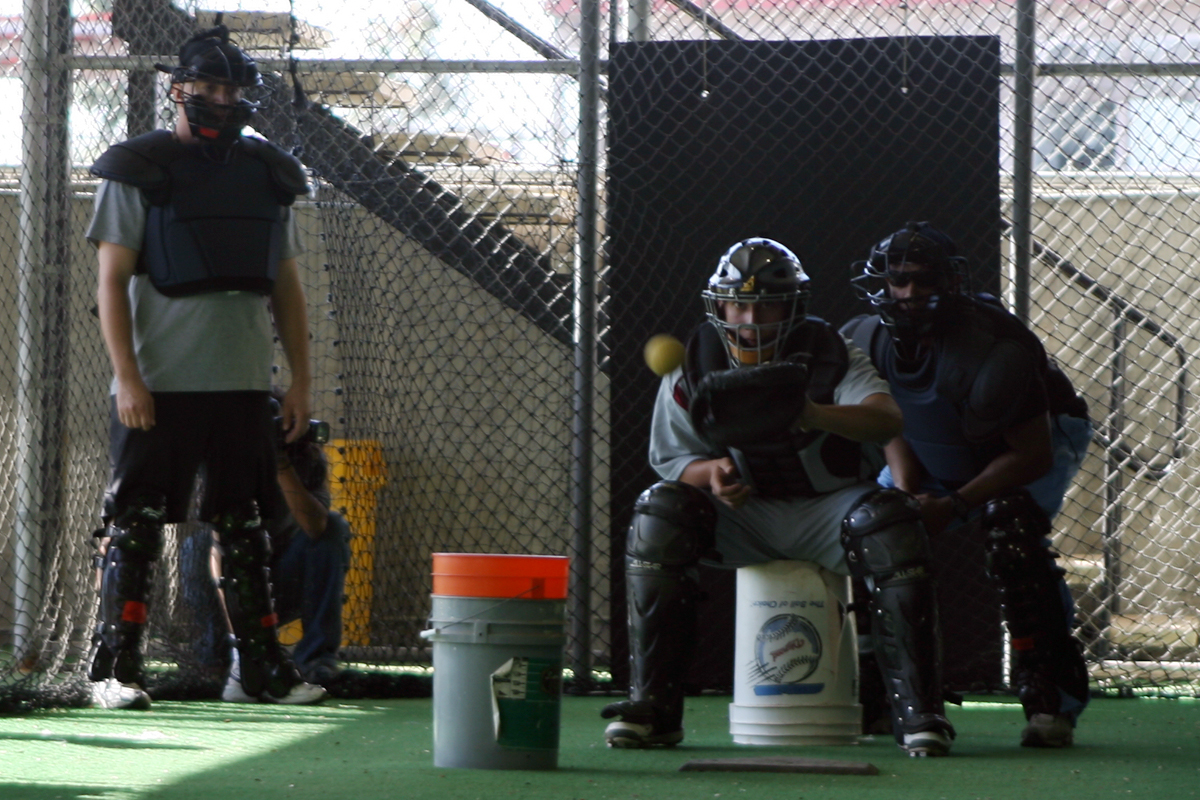
- A bullpen catcher in action

Occupation
- Occupation type: Sports role
- Activity sectors: Professional baseball

Description
- Competencies: Catching skills; warm-up coordination
- Fields of employment: Baseball teams (Major League and minor leagues)
- Related jobs: Catcher; Pitching coach

The bullpen catcher is a member of a baseball team's staff, often a former professional or college player, who catches the ball for relief pitchers warming up before entering a game and starting pitchers before games. A bullpen catcher differentiates from a typical catcher as they are considered a coach and not a player, thus they cannot be behind home plate in an official game.

== History ==
The duties of the bullpen catcher predate the coaching staff position itself. For many decades, it was standard for baseball teams to roster three catchers. The third catcher usually wouldn't see frequent playing time and was primarily responsible for helping pitchers warm up in the bullpen. In the 1980s, teams began to drop the third catcher from their roster in order to free up the spot to add a player considered more valuable. The bullpen catching duties were gradually shifted to a new position on the coaching staff instead of the active roster. Having a member of a team's staff dedicated solely to bullpen catching allowed them to become more specialized in it. This change has been attributed to Major League Baseball's financial rise in the 1980s.

Gary Waits was the first full-time bullpen catcher in Major League Baseball, being hired by the Cincinnati Reds in 1970 and remaining on the staff until 1978.

The bullpen catcher was once considered an entry-level "stepping stone" position for coaches who were looking to move up to higher-salary positions on the staff. In the 2000s, teams began to value the position more and tenures became longer. Mike Borzello caught for the Yankees bullpen for 11 years and has been credited with aiding the success of hall-of-fame reliever Mariano Rivera. Eli Whiteside was a catcher for the San Francisco Giants as a player and became a bullpen catcher for the team immediately after his retirement. He remained with the Giants bullpen since 2015. Whiteside took over for longtime Giants bullpen catcher Bill Hayes who cited his age as a reason for his move to first base coach. Many other 21st-century bullpen catchers stayed with one team for long stints; for example, Marcus Hanel served as the Milwaukee Brewers bullpen catcher for 20 years. Bill Duplissea started as the Kansas City Royals' bullpen catcher in 2006 and later became the team's advance scouting/replay coordinator.

Notable bullpen catchers include Rudy Arias, Cody Clark, Scott Cursi, Rob Flippo, Tom Gregorio, Mark Merila, Jeff Motuzas, Jason Phillips, Jamie Pogue, Dave Racaniello, Mark Reed, Román Rodríguez, Mark Salas, Steve Soliz, and Jesús Tiamo.
