= Dave Racaniello =

American baseball player (born 1978)

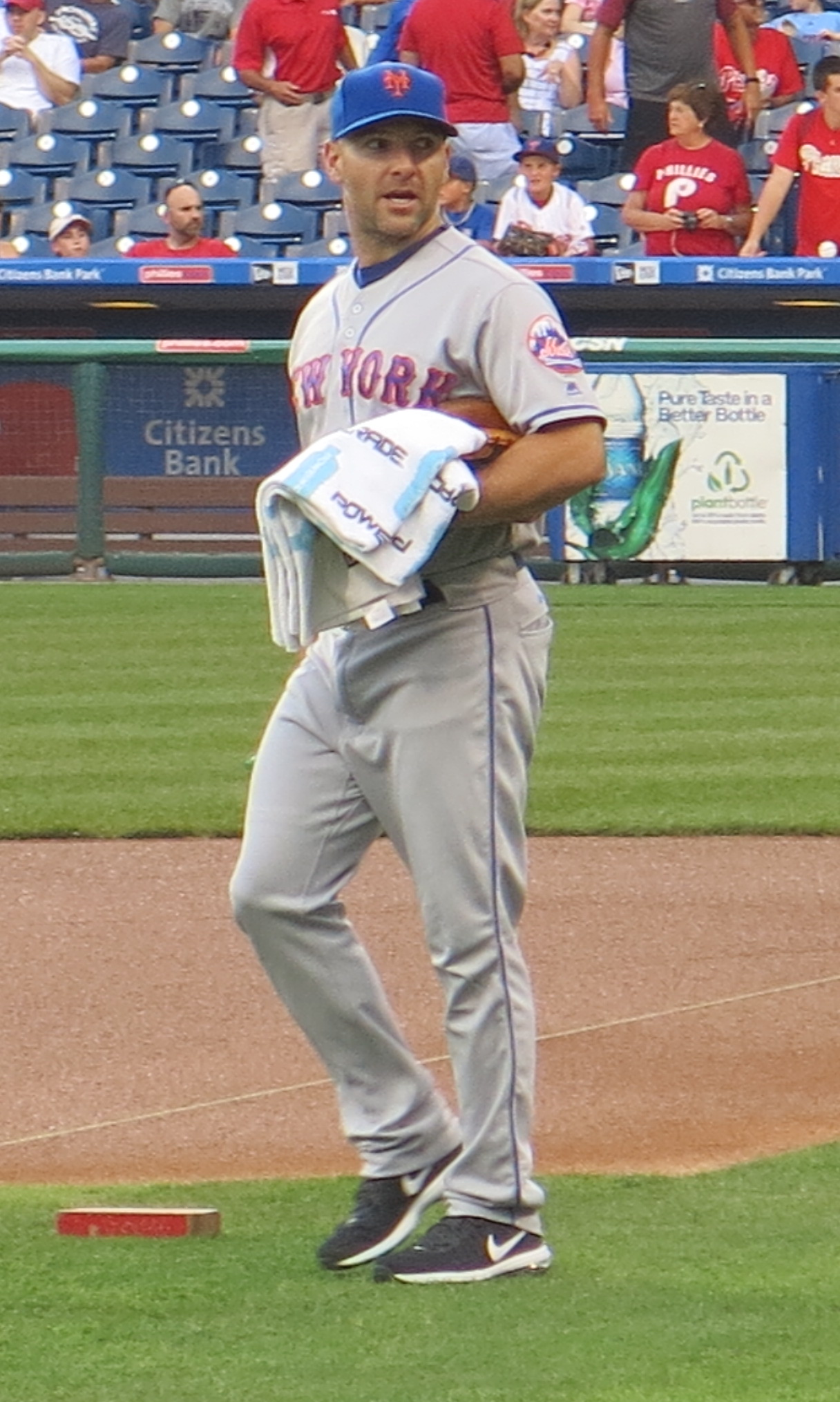
- Racaniello with the Mets in 2016

New York Mets – No. 77
- Bullpen catcher
- Born: June 3, 1978 (age 47); Stamford, Connecticut, U.S.
- Bats: Right Throws: Right

Teams
- As coach: New York Mets (1997, 2001–present)

David Racaniello (born June 3, 1978) is an American former professional baseball player who is a bullpen catcher for the New York Mets of Major League Baseball (MLB).

== Early life ==
Racaniello attended Westhill High School in Connecticut, later going on to attend Norwalk Community College and Central Connecticut State University.

== Amateur career ==
Racaniello played baseball at Westhill High School, including time as a catcher. He later went on to play baseball for Norwalk Community College for two years, where he was a teammate of future MLB pitcher Érik Bédard. In 1998, Racaniello's team at Norwalk won the NJCAA Division III Baseball World Series. Afterwards, he transferred to Central Connecticut State University, where he also played baseball.

== Professional career ==
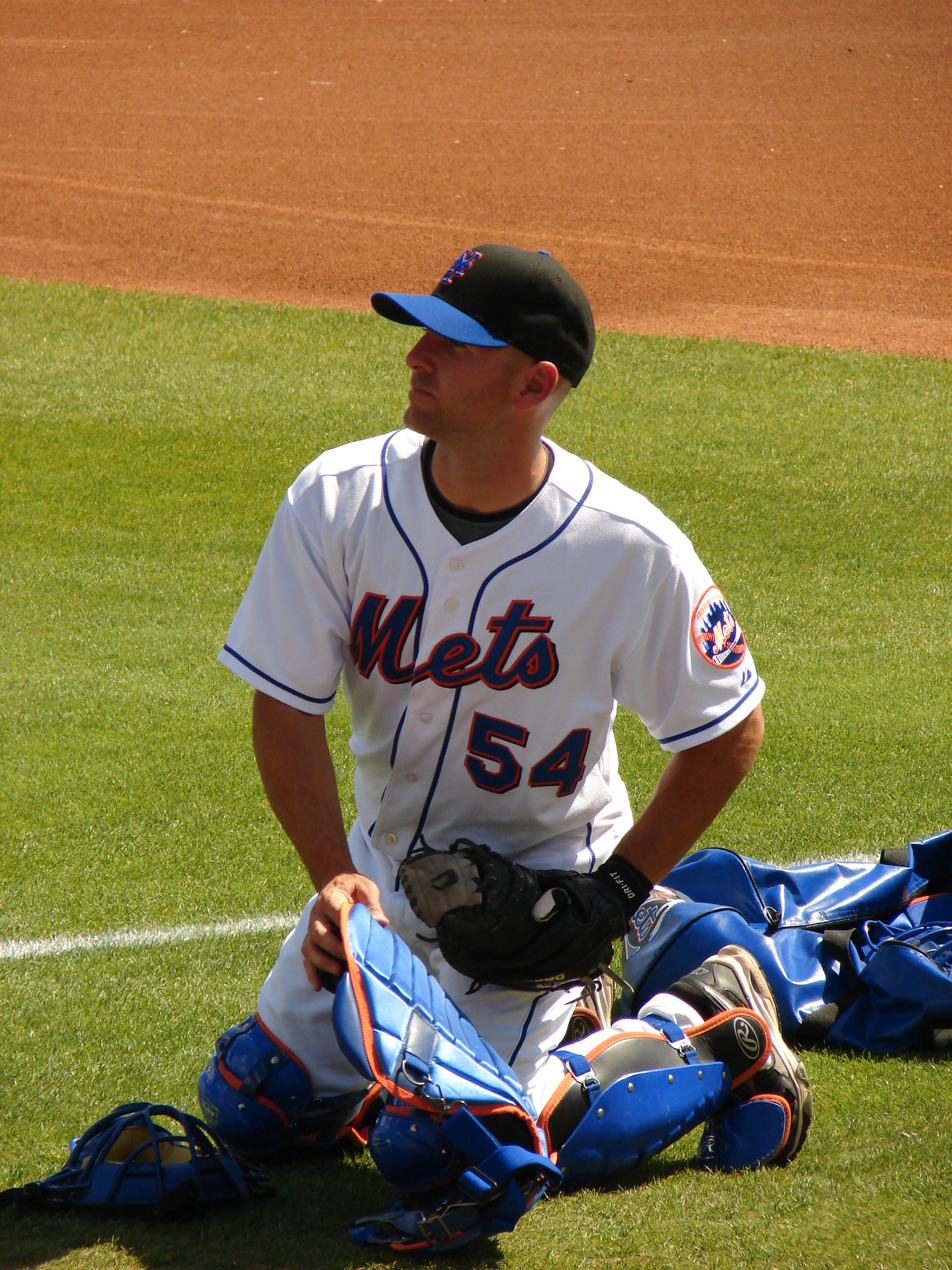
Racaniello with the Mets in Spring 2009

In the summer of 1997, Racaniello, then still a student at Norwalk, attended a Mets game with a friend. His friend's father was friends with the Mets' then-manager, Bobby Valentine, giving Racaniello and his friend an opportunity to meet the New York skipper before the game. The Mets' regular bullpen catcher at the time was not able to come to the game due to a recent family emergency, so Valentine, who had heard Racaniello had caught, asked him if he was willing to fill in. Racaniello agreed and suited up for the job. Racaniello would then fill in as the Mets' bullpen catcher and help out in the bullpen for most of the remainder of the 1997 season until he returned to Norwalk. When the position opened up for the 2001 season, the Mets asked him if he was interested in the job. He accepted and immediately dropped out of school to serve as the full-time bullpen catcher. He originally planned to possibly return to school, but his continued employment with the team prevented such a return. Since 2001, Racaniello has continuously served as the bullpen catcher for the Mets, warming up pitchers as well as throwing batting practice and serving as a "dummy" in drills. On March 30, 2017, Racaniello led off for the Mets' major league squad at designated hitter in a game against the Triple-A affiliate Las Vegas 51s. Racaniello recorded a hit off of Jacob deGrom, but was thrown out attempting to steal second base by Travis d'Arnaud.

== Personal life ==
Racaniello prefers to remain somewhat silent in the team clubhouse, reading books and staying out of the way. He is close friends with former third baseman David Wright, who first met him before the 2004 season. Racaniello is physically active, having climbed Mount Kilimanjaro in January 2012 and run the New York City Marathon twice. In 2011, Racaniello consumed 14 cheesesteaks to break Dmitri Young's record for most consumed in the Philadelphia Phillies visiting clubhouse.
