= Mike Borzello =

Italian-American baseball player (born 1970)

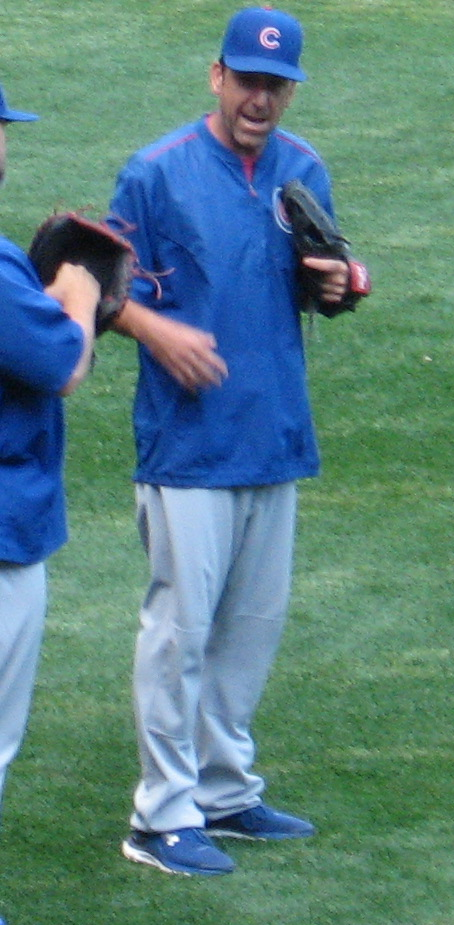
- Borzello with the Cubs in 2016
- Coach
- Born: August 14, 1970 (age 56); Yonkers, New York, U.S.
- Bats: Right Throws: Right
- Stats at Baseball Reference

Teams
- New York Yankees (1996–2006); Los Angeles Dodgers (2007–2011); Chicago Cubs (2012–2021)

Career highlights and awards
- 5× World Series champion (1996, 1998, 1999, 2000, 2016)

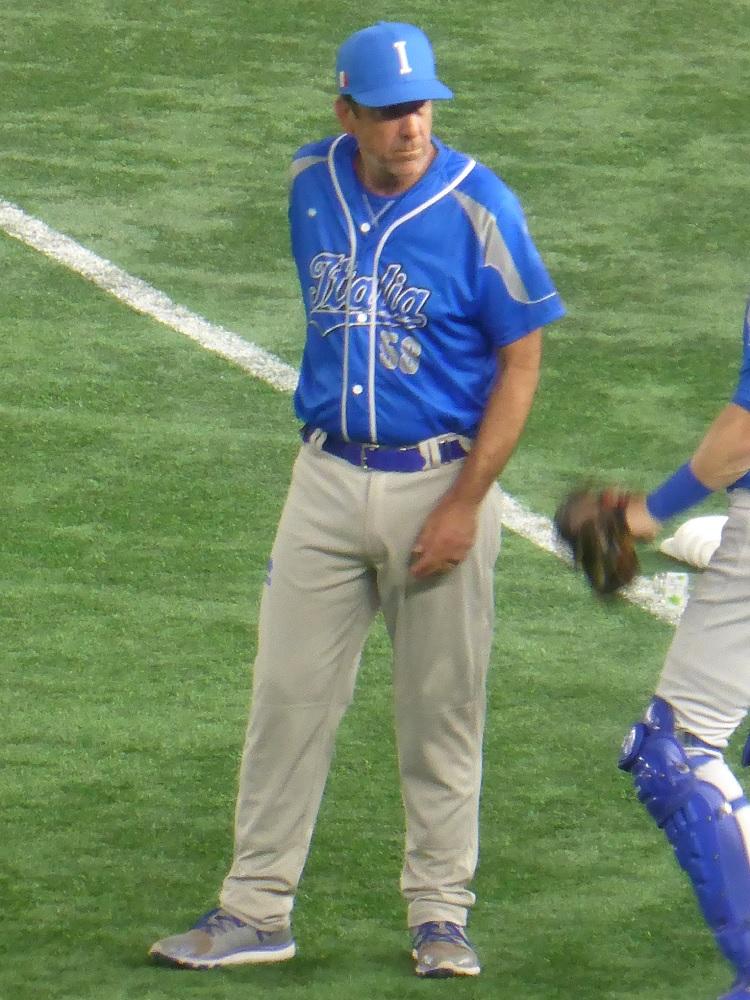
Borzello, coach for the WBC Italy national team at Tokyo Dome on March 16, 2023

Michael Ross Borzello (born August 14, 1970) is an Italian-American professional baseball coach and former catcher who has worked in Major League Baseball (MLB) for the New York Yankees, Los Angeles Dodgers, Chicago Cubs, and San Diego Padres.

In June 1991, Borzello signed with the St. Louis Cardinals. After five years as a minor league catcher in the Cardinals organization, he became a bullpen catcher/batting practice pitcher and charted games for the New York Yankees. From 2008 to 2010, he was a Los Angeles Dodgers catching instructor. From 2012 through 2021, he served as a catching/strategy coach and associate pitching coach for the Chicago Cubs.

== Early life ==
Borzello was raised in Tarzana, Los Angeles. He is of Italian descent. He grew up in the game of baseball and is the godson of former Major League manager and Hall of Famer Joe Torre. His sister, Keri Borzello, was an NCAA Women's College World Series participant in 1994, as a catcher and first baseman for the Missouri Tigers. She later transferred to UCLA after a career ending rotator cuff injury.

Early in his life, a then-12-year-old Borzello had been serving as a batboy for the Atlanta Braves - at that time, managed by Torre - and found himself in the middle of a series of brawls between the Braves and the visiting San Diego Padres on August 12, 1984, at Atlanta–Fulton County Stadium. "When the fans started throwing stuff and jumped onto the field, I was like, 'OK, I gotta get out of here,' Borzello later said.

== Career ==
Borzello graduated from Taft High School in Woodland Hills, Los Angeles, California and was a baseball player during his college years at California Lutheran University. He played as a catcher in Minor League Baseball in the farm system of the St. Louis Cardinals organization from 1991 through 1995, never getting above class A.

== Coaching career ==
=== New York Yankees (1996–2007) ===
In 1995, after his playing career ended, Torre offered him a job with the New York Yankees as a bullpen catcher and batting practice pitcher. Borzello earned four World Series rings with the New York Yankees during the 1996, 1998, 1999, and 2000 seasons. During his time in pinstripes he went to 6 World Series. When Torre left the Yankees for the Dodgers after 2007, he brought Borzello with him as catching instructor going to the NLCS in 2008 and 2009 ultimately losing to the Philadelphia Phillies both years.

=== Chicago Cubs (2012–2021) ===
In 2012, Borzello left the Dodgers to join the Cubs as a catching instructor/strategist and associate pitching coach. He earned another World Series ring with the Cubs in the 2016 World Series. He was ejected for the first time in his career on August 29, 2020 (along with Cubs manager David Ross, Reds manager David Bell, Reds Designated Hitter Joey Votto, and Reds Left Fielder Jesse Winker). He was suspended for 1 game for his actions. He was ejected again in Pittsburgh by Greg Gibson after Kris Bryant was hit by a pitch. Overall, Borzello coached under four different Cubs managers: Dale Sveum, Rick Renteria, Joe Maddon, and David Ross. On October 6, 2021, Cubs general manager Jed Hoyer announced that Borzello was departing the organization.

=== San Diego Padres (2023–present) ===
In 2023 Borzello joined the San Diego Padres as an advance scout.

Borzello was named pitching coach for Team Italy in the 2023 WBC where they defeated Cuba and the Netherlands before ultimately losing to eventual tournament champion Japan
