= Pepper (baseball) =

Exercise and competitive game in baseball

Pepper is both a common batting and fielding exercise and a competitive game in baseball, during which one player hits brisk ground balls to a group of fielders who are standing nearby.

== Exercise ==
Pepper is a common pre-game exercise in which one player hits brisk grounders and line drives to a group of fielders who are standing about twenty feet away. The fielders throw balls to the batter, who uses a short, light swing to hit the ball on the ground towards the fielders. The fielders field the ground balls and continue tossing the ball to the batter. This exercise keeps the fielders and batter alert, and helps to develop quickness and good hand-eye coordination.

== Game ==
Pepper is also a competitive game in which a group of fielders stand in a line fifteen to twenty feet away from a batter; one end of the line is the "front," the other the "back." One of the fielders throws the ball to the batter, who attempts to hit grounders to the fielders standing in the line. When a fielder cleanly plays the ball, they throw it back to the batter, generally as quickly as possible; the batter then tries to hit the ball again to the fielders. If the fielder makes an error in fielding the ball, he or she must move to the back of the line. If the batter hits a foul ball (generally, hits it behind themselves) or strikes swinging at the ball, they are retired as a batter, becomes a fielder, and moves to the end of the line. The fielder at the front of the line then becomes the batter. If the batter hits a line drive or pop-up to the fielders, whoever catches the ball, regardless of their position in the line, becomes the new batter; the batter moves to the end of the line.

== Banning ==
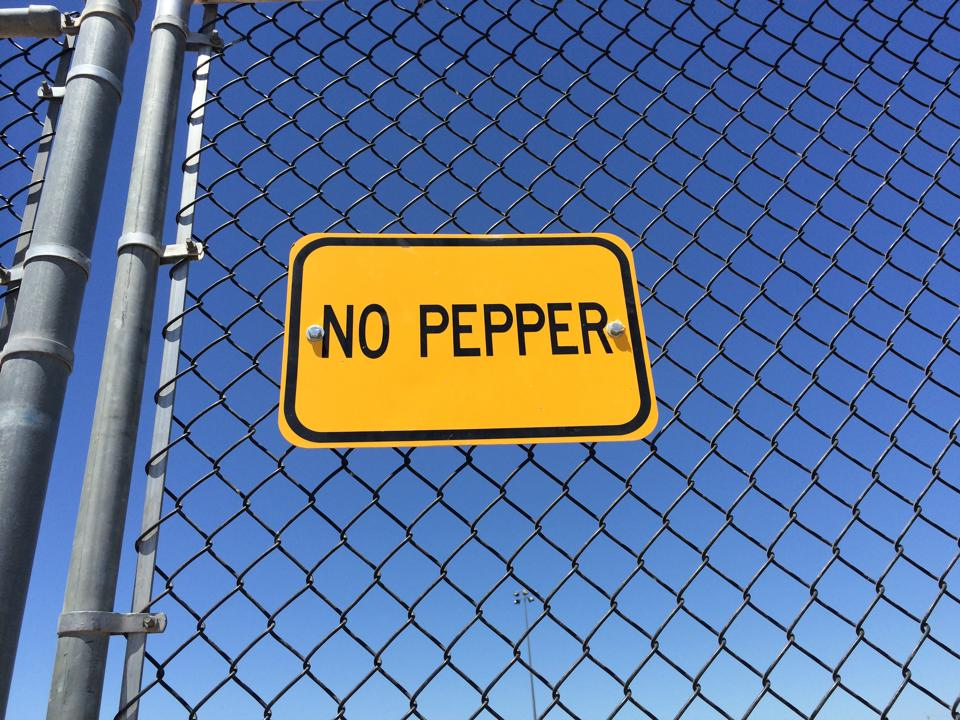
NO PEPPER sign posted at public baseball field park in Brentwood, California

Some ballparks have banned pepper games because of the danger of balls landing in the stands and injuring spectators, as well as because its concentrated play damages the grass. Many ballparks display "NO PEPPER (GAMES)" warnings behind or near home plate.
