= Bill Duplissea (baseball) =

American baseball player (born 1977)

External photo
- Bill Duplissea (2017)

William Joseph Duplissea (born September 27, 1977) is an American baseball coach and former player who is the advance scouting/replay coordinator for the Kansas City Royals in Major League Baseball. He was previously the Royals' bullpen catcher and played baseball in the Los Angeles Dodgers' minor league system.

== Early life and education ==
Duplissea was born in San Carlos, California. He attended college and played baseball at the College of San Mateo and the University of California, Santa Barbara. At the latter, he was named as a conference All-Big West Baseball Team honorable mention in 1999. While still in college, Duplissea was drafted in the 39th round of the 1997 Major League Baseball draft by the Baltimore Orioles, but did not sign.

== Career ==
After college, Duplissea signed with the Los Angeles Dodgers. He played in their minor league development system for five seasons beginning in 1999, reaching as high as Triple-A. He never broke into the major leagues and retired after playing in seven Double-A games in 2003.

After leaving the minor leagues, Duplissea coached at the junior college level for about three years. That included time serving as an assistant coach at his alma mater, the College of San Mateo. In 2006, he became the bullpen catcher for the Kansas City Royals. The career move was offered to him by Bob McClure, his baseball coach at the College of San Mateo who had since become the Royals' pitching coach. He remained in the role until 2012, when he moved into advance scouting for the Royals.

In 2014, the Royals added to Duplissea's advance scouting duties by making him the team's replay coordinator. The move came after the introduction of managerial challenges to the sport. During games, Duplissea's role is to stay in the team clubhouse, watch the game's film in real-time, and alert the Royals' coaching staff when an umpire's ruling could be overturned with a challenge. As of 2024, Duplissea remained in both positions, but in 2025 the Royals listed him only as a replay coordinator.

=== Replay coordinator ===
Duplissea is best known for being highly skilled in the replay coordinator role. Between 2014 and 2022, the Royals successfully overturned calls on 65.7% of challenges, outranking every other team in baseball. In Duplissea's first season as replay coordinator, then-Royals manager Ned Yost commended Duplissea's work to the Associated Press. "We got a real good video analyst", he said. "Very seldom does he ever make a mistake".

The Kansas City Star said Duplissea had "the best eyes in baseball" near the end of the 2017 season when the Royals were statistically the most successful team at challenging calls (having been successful in 22 of their 30 attempts). They had also led the league in the same category in 2016. In 2018, The Athletic posited that Duplissea might be the most valuable member of the 2018 Royals team, ahead of any of the team's players. "There is nobody in baseball better at looking at an instant replay and judging when to challenge an umpire's call", reporter Rustin Dodd wrote.
