= Strike zone =

Target zone for a pitched baseball

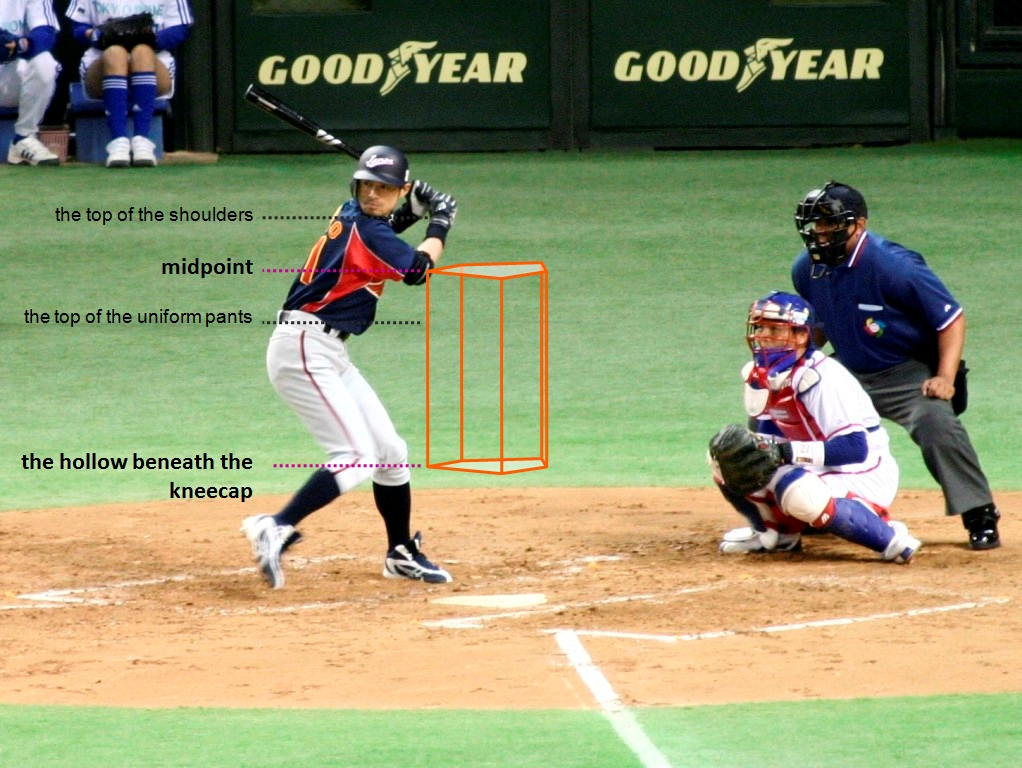
A labelled drawing of the strike zone superimposed onto an image from a game, showing a batter, catcher and umpire. The pitcher (not pictured) pitches a baseball to the catcher; the batter attempts to hit this baseball; and the umpire decides whether pitches are balls or strikes.

In baseball, the strike zone is the area of space through which a pitch must pass in order to be called a strike even if the batter does not swing. The strike zone is defined as the volume of space above home plate and between the batter's knees and the midpoint of his torso. Whether a pitch passes through the zone is decided by an umpire, who is generally positioned behind the catcher.

Strikes are desirable for the pitcher and the fielding team, as three strikes result in a strikeout of that batter. A pitch that misses the strike zone is called a ball if the batter does not swing at it. Balls are desirable for the batter and the batting team, as four balls allow the batter to take a "walk" to first base as a base on balls.

Tetsuto Yamada of the Tokyo Yakult Swallows swings and misses for strike one, 2024

== Definition ==
The strike zone is a volume of space, a vertical right pentagonal prism. Its sides are vertical planes extending up from the edges of home plate. The official rules of Major League Baseball define the top of the strike zone as the midpoint between the top of the batter's shoulders and the top of his uniform pants, and the bottom of the strike zone is at the hollow beneath the kneecap, both determined from the batter's stance as he is prepared to swing at the pitched ball, although the de facto enforced strike zone can vary based on the umpire's perspective. The official rules define a pitch as a strike "if any part of the ball passes through any part of the strike zone", with the ball required to have not bounced. Thus, a pitch that touches the outer boundary of the zone is as much a strike as a pitch that is thrown right down the center. A pitch passing outside the front of the strike zone but curving so as to enter this volume farther back (without being hit) is sometimes called a "back-door strike". Various other rulebooks for baseball and softball define the strike zone slightly differently.

Beginning in 2026, with the introduction of the Automated Ball-Strike System, the MLB strike zone was formally defined as being between 27% and 53.5% of a player's listed height.

A pitch is also a strike if the batter swings or offers the bat in an attempt to hit the pitch. A pitch batted into foul territory—a foul ball—is also a strike, unless the batter already has two strikes. Any pitch not called a strike, swung on and missed, or fouled-off, is a "ball" (originally "no ball").

A batter who accumulates three strikes in a single batting appearance has struck out and is ruled out (with the exception of an uncaught third strike); a batter who accumulates four balls in a single appearance has drawn a base on balls (or walk) and is awarded advancement to first base. In very early iterations of the rules during the 19th century, it took up to nine balls for a batter to earn a walk. However, to make up for this, he could request the ball to be pitched high, low, or medium.

== History ==
Originally, the word "strike" was used literally: the batter striking at the ball in an effort to hit it. For example, the 11th rule of the Knickerbocker Rules (1845) read "Three balls being struck at and missed and the last one caught, is a hand-out." There was no adverse consequence if the batter did not swing, i.e. the called strike did not exist, the result being batters prepared to wait all day for "their" pitch. It was not until the 1858 NABBP convention that a rule was adopted authorizing the umpire to impose a penalty strike for such conduct: "Should a striker stand at the bat without striking at good balls repeatedly pitched to him, for the purpose of delaying the game or of giving advantage to a player, the umpire, after warning him, shall call one strike, and if he persists in such action, two and three strikes. When three strikes are called, he shall be subject to the same rules as if he had struck at three balls." The called ball first appeared in the rules of 1863, similarly as a discretionary penalty imposed on the pitcher for persistently delivering "unfair" balls.

Whether or not a pitch was "unfair" or the batter was being unreasonably picky was left entirely to the umpire's judgment. Well into the 1870s, umpires were reluctant to make such calls, since they were viewed as penalties for unsportsmanlike play. By the 1880s, they had become routine, and the modern view took hold, that every pitch results in either a swing, a ball or a called strike. The first rule leading to the creation of a defined strike zone was enacted by the American Association before the 1886 season. As explained in The Sporting Life on March 17, 1886, "the ball must be delivered at the height called for by the batsman. If at such height it passes over any part of the plate then it is a strike. The idea is to give the pitcher a chance against some cranky umpires who compelled the twirlers to almost cut the plate in two before a strike would be called, even if the height was right." The following year, the National League created the full strike zone, eliminating the batter's right to call the height of the pitch, and instead requiring the umpire to call a strike on any pitch that "passes over home plate not lower than the batsman's knee, nor higher than his shoulders."

Major League Baseball has occasionally redefined the strike zone to control the balance of power between pitchers and hitters. After the record home run year by Roger Maris in 1961, the major leagues increased the size of the strike zone by raising the top of the zone from the batter's armpit to the top of his shoulder. In 1968, pitchers such as Denny McLain and Bob Gibson dominated hitters, producing 339 shutouts. Carl Yastrzemski was the only American League hitter to finish the season with a batting average higher than .300. In the National League, Gibson posted a 1.12 earned run average, the lowest in 54 years, while Los Angeles Dodgers pitcher Don Drysdale threw a record 58 2/3 consecutive scoreless innings during the 1968 season. As a result of the dropping offensive statistics, Major League Baseball reduced pitchers' advantage by lowering the height of the mound from 15 inches (380 mm) to 10 inches (250 mm), and by reducing the size of the strike zone for the 1969 season to extend only from the batter's armpits to the top of the knees. In 1985, the top of the strike zone was lowered to the midpoint of the batter's torso, as viewed from a vertical angle by the umpire.

Beginning in 2026, with the introduction of the Automated Ball-Strike System, the zone was formally defined as being between 27% and 53.5% of a player's listed height. Standardized procedures for measuring player height were also introduced, resulting in a reduction in listed heights for over half of all active players.

== Enforcement ==
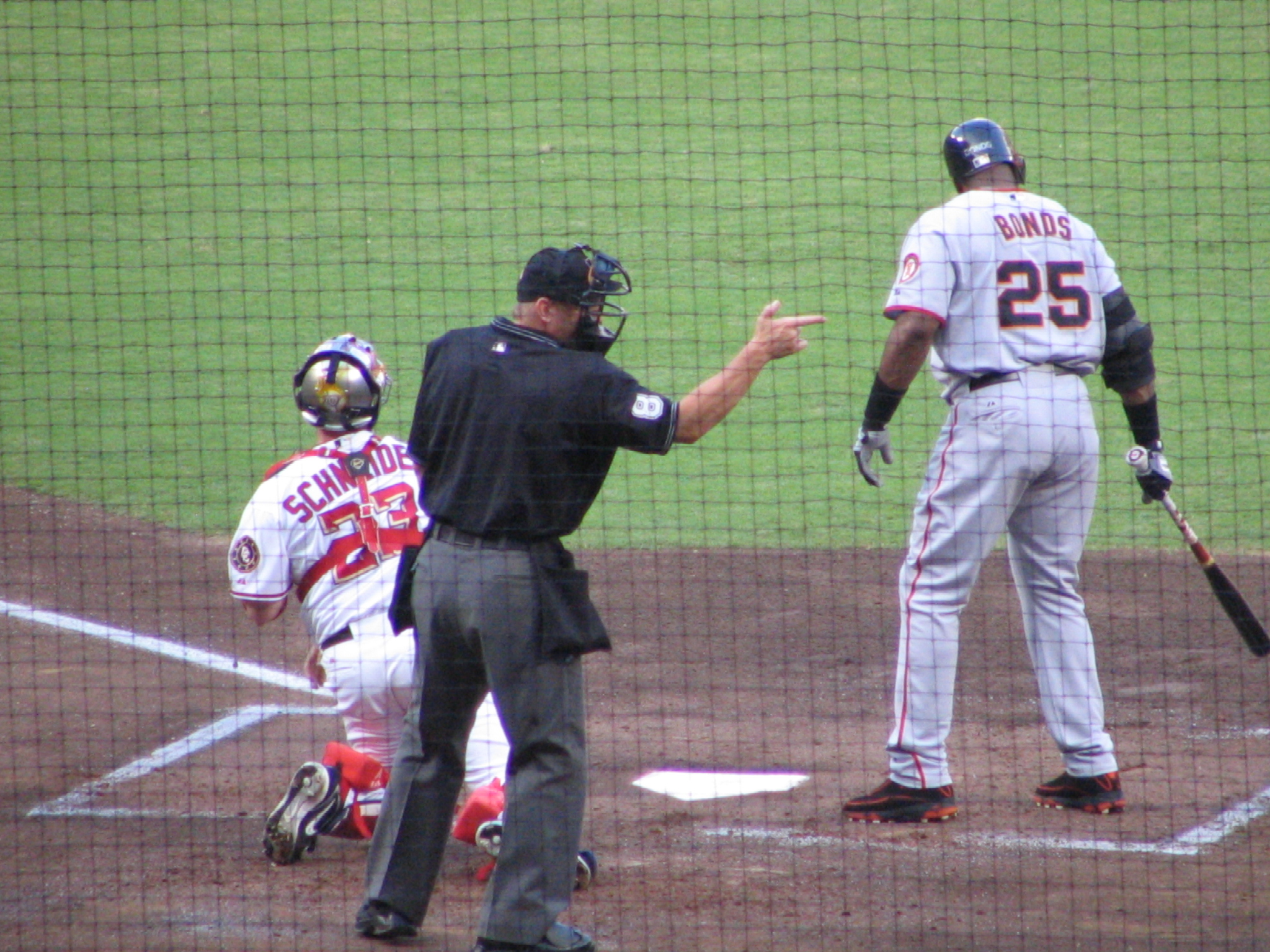
An umpire calling a strike on Barry Bonds (#25)

While baseball rules provide a precise definition for the strike zone, in practice, it is up to the judgment of the umpire to decide whether the pitch passed through the zone.

The Official Baseball Rules (Rule 8.02(a), including Comment) state that objections to judgment calls on the field, including balls and strikes, shall not be tolerated, and any manager, coach, or player who leaves his dugout or field position to contest a judgment call will first be warned, and then ejected.

Many umpires, players and analysts, including the authors of a University of Nebraska study on the subject, believe that due to the QuesTec pitch-tracking system, the enforced strike zone in 2002–2006 was larger compared to the zone in 1996–2000 and thus closer to the rulebook definition. Some commentators believed the zone had changed so much that some pitchers, such as Tom Glavine, had to radically adjust their approach to pitching for strikes. In 2003, a frustrated Curt Schilling took a baseball bat to a QuesTec camera and destroyed it after a loss, saying the umpires should not be changing the strike zone to match the machines.

In 2009, a new system called Zone Evaluation was implemented in all 30 Major League ballparks, replacing the QuesTec system; the new system records the ball's position in flight more than 20 times before it reaches home plate. Much of the early resistance from Major League umpires to QuesTec had diminished and the implementation of the new Zone Evaluation system in all the parks went largely unmentioned to fans. Like the old system, the new system will be used to grade umpires on accuracy and used to determine which umpires receive postseason assignments, but games themselves are still subject to their error.

Beginning in the late 2010s, Minor League Baseball tested the Automated Ball-Strike System (ABS) on an experimental basis for several seasons. While the umpire continues to call balls and strikes, ABS determines the strike zone and could be used when a team challenged the umpire's call. Major League Baseball commissioner Rob Manfred said in October 2022 that ABS would eventually be used in Major League games. ESPN reported that all AAA games would use ABS in the 2023 season. For 2023, the system was used for half of all games, with the other half using umpires, with ABS used for up to three challenges per team for each game. The system was fully introduced at the major league level in 2026.

== See also ==
- Glossary of baseball terms
