= USLHT Jessamine =

US lighthouse service ship

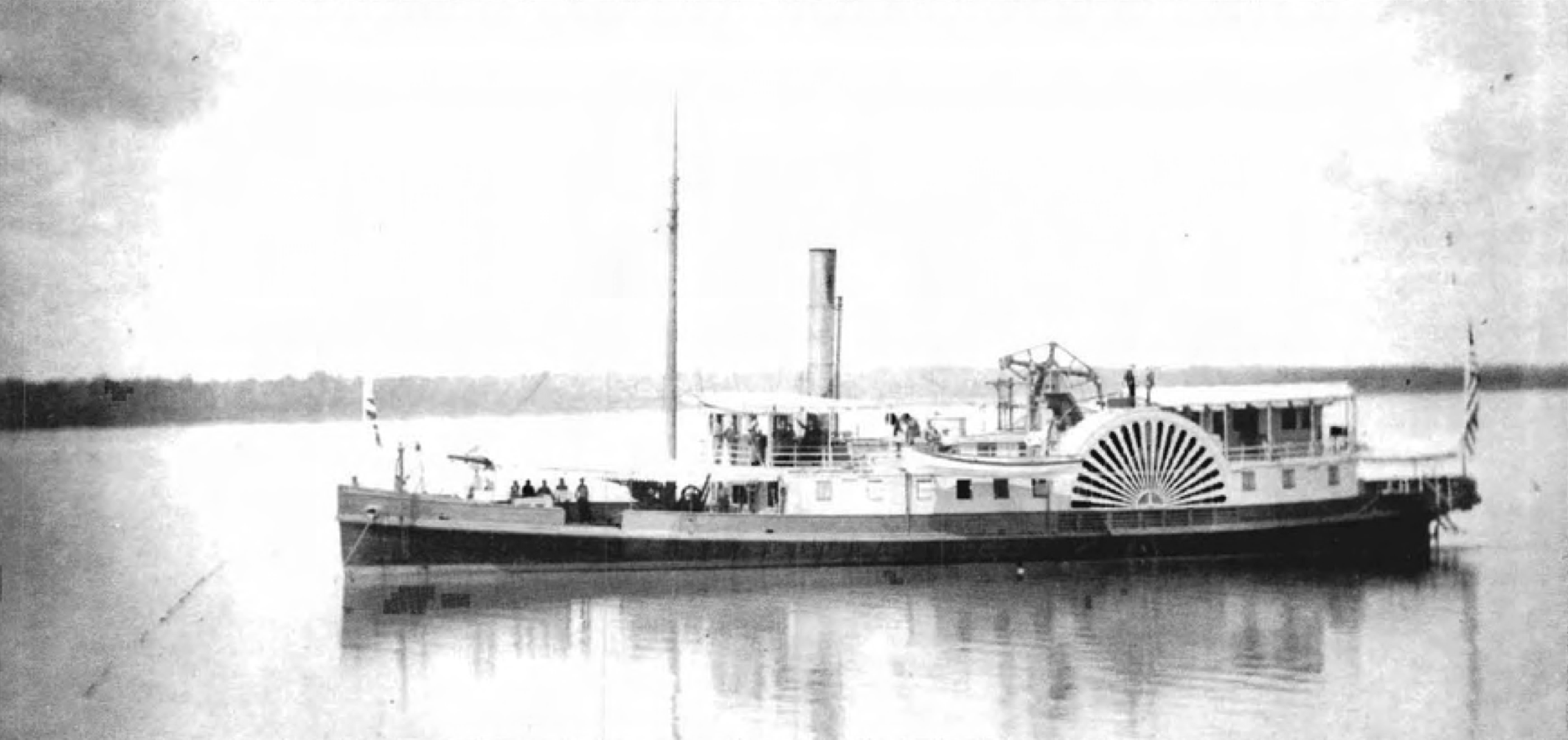
- USLHT Jessamine in 1885

History

United States
- Name: Jessamine
- Operator: US Lighthouse Service (1881–1917); US Navy (1917–1919); US Lighthouse Service (1919–1922)
- Builder: Malster & Reaney
- Cost: $41,911; ($1,365,576 in modern dollars)
- Commissioned: 1 October 1881
- Decommissioned: 20 May 1921
- Identification: Signal letters G.V.M.J.
- Fate: Sold, 1 March 1922

United States
- Name: Queenstown
- Operator: Peninsula Ferry Company
- Acquired: 1922
- Identification: Official number 222103
- Fate: Sold in bankruptcy auction, 1923

United States
- Name: Victor Lynn
- Operator: Victor Lynn Transportation Company (1924–1930); Red Star Lines (1930–1938); Victor Lynn Lines (1939–1957)
- Identification: Official number 222103
- Fate: Sold in 1957

Honduras
- Name: Victor Lynn
- Operator: Kent Fruit Importing Company
- Fate: sunk, October 1959

General characteristics
- Type: Lighthouse tender
- Displacement: 427 long tons (434 t) full load
- Length: 156 ft (47.5 m)
- Beam: 39 ft (11.9 m)
- Draft: 8 ft 1 in (2.5 m) full load
- Installed power: 350 BHP
- Propulsion: Marine condensing beam steam engine; return flue "lobster back" coal-fired boiler; side paddle wheels
- Complement: 21

USLHT Jessamine was a steam-powered sidewheel lighthouse tender built in 1881 for the United States Lighthouse Board. She spent forty years in government service, homeported in Baltimore, Maryland as part of the 5th Lighthouse District. Her primary mission was to build and maintain lighthouses in Chesapeake Bay and nearby waterways in Maryland, Virginia, and North Carolina. Some of the lighthouses she built still stand.

In 1922 the ship was sold to private interests. She spent most of the rest of her career carrying freight between Salisbury, Maryland and Baltimore. When competition from trucks on improved roads and bridges rendered her service uneconomic in 1957, she was repurposed to carry bananas from Mexico to Brownsville, Texas. She sank on this route in October 1959.

== Construction and characteristics ==
During the 2nd session of the 46th Congress, Congress appropriated $90,000 for the construction of two "steam-tenders for general service on the Atlantic Coast." The Baltimore shipbuilding firm of Malster & Reaney secured the contract and began work on Jessamine and her sistership USLHT Holly in 1880. Jessamine's original cost was $41,911.

The ship had a composite hull with wood frames and iron sheathing. She was 156 feet (48 m) long, with a beam of 24 feet 2 inches (7.37 m), which extended to 39 feet (12 m) including her paddlewheel guards. Her draft was 7 feet 3 inches (2.21 m) when light and 8 feet 1 inch (2.46 m) when fully loaded. Jessamine displaced 369 tons when light and 427 tons when fully loaded.

She had a walking-beam steam engine with a cylinder that was 36 inches in diameter with a stroke of 7 feet. Its indicated horsepower was 350. Her initial boiler was 26 feet 6 inches in length and 7 feet 10 inches in diameter. Her original boiler was coal-fired. Her boiler was replaced in March 1884, in May 1889, and again in 1902. Her engine drove two side-mounted paddlewheels. One of the paddlewheel shafts was replaced in 1911.

Jessamine had one mast forward which served both as a derrick to enable her construction work, and to fly a foresail and staysail.

The ship had a regular complement of 4 officers and 16 enlisted men.

Jessamine sailed on a sea trial on 22 September 1881. Evidently, the trial went well, as General Orville E. Babcock, Engineer for the 5th Lighthouse District, accepted her from her builders within the week.

Jessamine replaced USLHT Tulip, while USLHT Holly, her sistership, replaced USLHT Heliotrope. Jessamine's namesake was the twining vine Jessamine, native to the Southeast United States and the state flower of South Carolina.

After she entered commercial service as part of the Victor Lynn Transportation Company in 1924, the ship's steam engine, boiler, and sidewheels were replaced with two Diesel engines driving two propellers. The refit was done at the shipyard of Smith and Williams in Salisbury. With her new propulsion machinery, she achieved a speed of 13 miles per hour (21 km/h). In this new configuration, Victor Lynn had a gross register tonnage of 372, and a net register tonnage of 240.

== United States government service ==
Jessamine was commissioned on 1 October 1881. During her forty years of government service, her primary responsibility was building and maintaining lighthouses and other aids to navigation in Chesapeake Bay, the rivers that flowed into it, and the northern coast and sounds of North Carolina. During her government career she was part of several different organizations.

Jessamine first sailed when the U.S. Lighthouse Service was controlled by the U.S. Lighthouse Board, a bureau of the U.S. Department of the Treasury. In this quasi-military organization, each Lighthouse District had an Inspector, typically a Naval officer, and an Engineer, typically an Army officer. Jessamine supported the Engineer, whose responsibility was constructing and maintaining lighthouses and other aids to navigation. In 1903, the Lighthouse Board was transferred to the newly created U.S. Department of Commerce and Labor. Since the Lighthouse Board still had operational control of the U.S. Lighthouse Service, little changed in Jessamine's operations. In 1910, Congress abolished the Lighthouse Board and replaced it with an all-civilian bureau of the U.S. Department of Commerce and Labor. Jessamine became part of this new organization. This change did impact the ship's work in that District Inspectors and Engineers were replaced by a single District Supervisor. All ships did any work they were assigned. On 11 April 1917 President Wilson issued Executive Order 2588 transferring a number of lighthouse tenders to support the American effort in World War I. Jessamine was transferred from the administrative control of the Commerce Department to the War Department and she came under the jurisdiction of the U.S. Navy. Little changed in her day-to-day responsibilities, however, and at the conclusion of the war, Jessamine and the rest of the Lighthouse Service was returned to the Commerce Department on 1 July 1919.

Regardless of her organization, Jessamine was busy. Her activities in 1907, reported by the Lighthouse Board, were typical:

Jessamine- The vessel was employed during the year in making repairs and improvements on 69 light-stations and two light-house depots and in the inspection of 60 light-stations and two light-house depots. She made borings at the site of Ragged Point and Pungoteague Creek light-station, Virginia, to determine the character of the foundation. She rendered assistance to a schooner in distress off Pamlico Point, North Carolina. She sounded around four light-houses to ascertain the extent of erosion of the shoal. She was used in the investigation of damage done to two light-stations by colliding vessels. She was engaged in loading and unloading materials for light stations 16 days, in cleaning and painting tender 63 days, in cleaning boiler 7 days, and was undergoing repairs 29 days. She steamed about 7,086 miles during the year, consuming some 675 tons of soft coal.

While the Engineers of the 5th Lighthouse District changed with the regularity of Army careers, Jessamine's captain from her launch in 1881 through his death in April 1901 was John E. Wyatt. John David Brown served even longer as the ship's engineer, from her launch through his retirement in 1906.

=== Lighthouse support ===
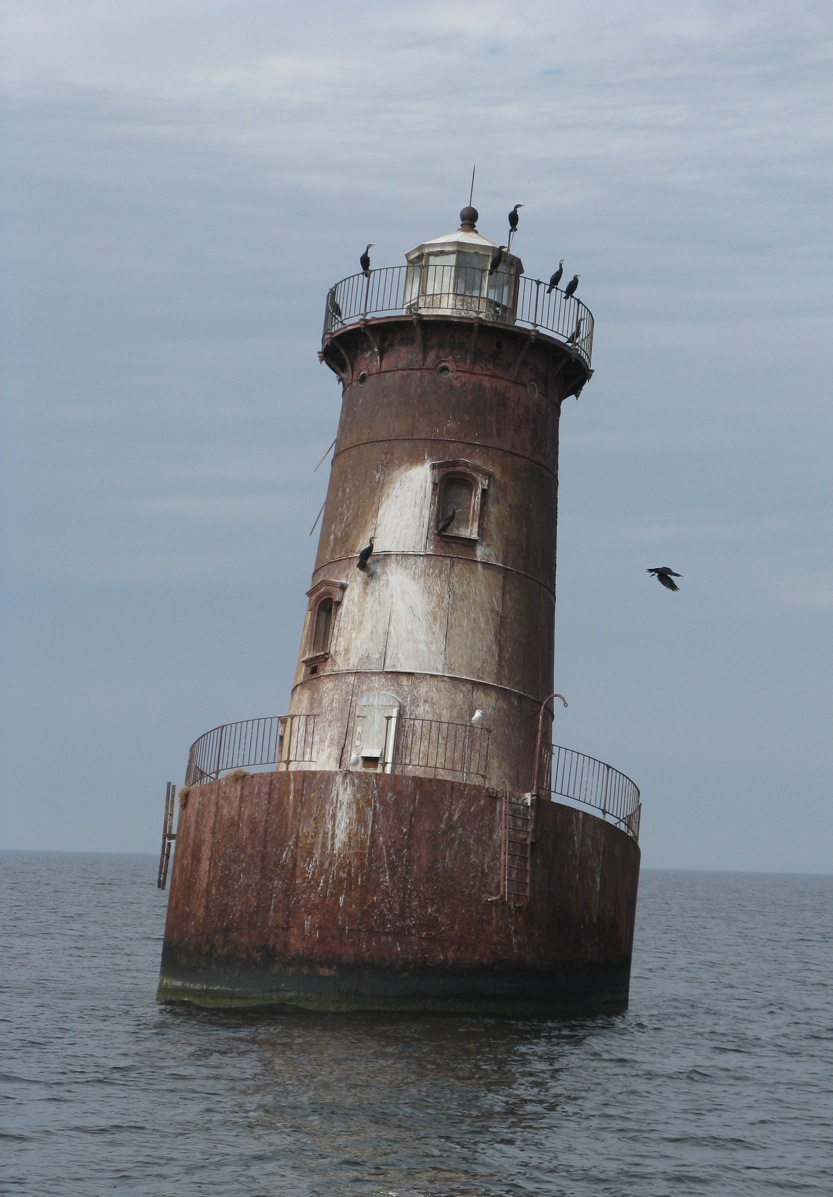
Sharp's Island Light, built by Jessamine in 1881 and still standing

Jessamine's principal work in the 1880s was building new lights in Chesapeake Bay. In November and December 1881, shortly after her commissioning, Jessamine hauled a new tower to replace the Sharp's Island Light which had been destroyed by ice in the previous winter. This structure is still in place today, but leaning noticeably due to pressure from winter ice. In 1894 Jessamine, along with USLHT Thistle participated in the erection of the Pages Rock Light in the York River. Jessamine hauled material and men for the construction of the Boush's Bluff, Gull Shoal, Kent Point, Lower Cedar Point, Maryland Point, Cape Charles, Hog Island, North River Bar, Sharkfin Shoal, and Wolf Trap Lights, making five separate trips to the Cape Charles during construction.

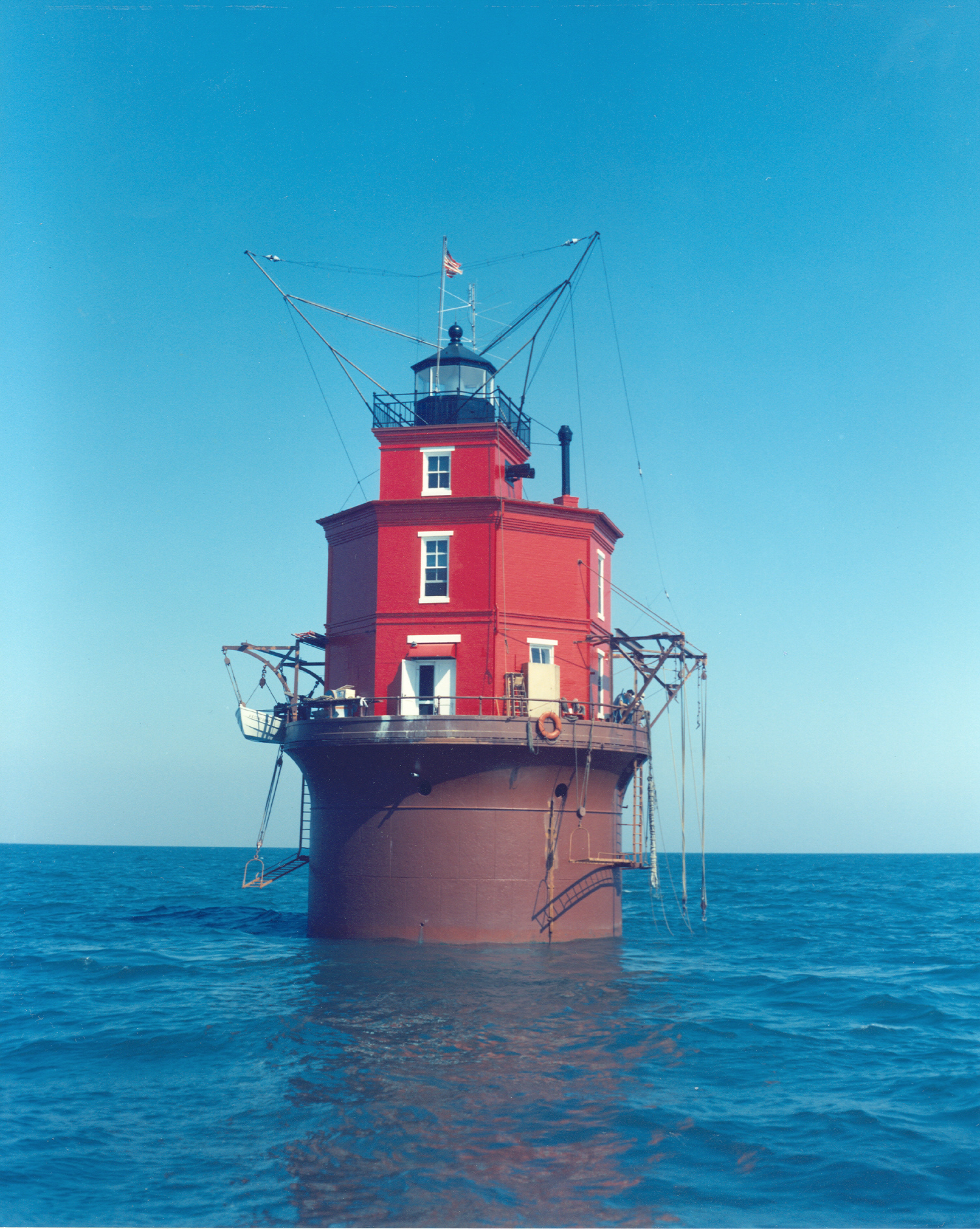
The second Wolf Trap Light, built by Jessamine in 1894

As the aids to navigation environment evolved, there were also lighthouses which were dismantled. Jessamine salvaged useful equipment from these sites for use elsewhere. Lighthouses which she dismantled include Wade Point, Lambert's Point, and Clay Island Lights.

Exposed to corrosive saltwater, and buffeted by wind, wave, and ice, lighthouses required periodic maintenance. Jessamine made maintenance visits to the Bloody Point, Cape Henry, Cove Point, Great Wicomico, Holland Bar, Hooper Strait, Jones' Point, Love Point, New Point Comfort, Thimble Shoal, Thomas' Point, Turkey Point, Windmill Point, York Spit, Blaistone Island, Back River, Cape Charles City, Cape Hatteras, Choptank River, Cobb Point Bar, Craighill Channel, Craney Island, Croatan, Cutoff Channel, Deep-Water Shoals, James Island, Jordan Point, Laurel Point, Lower Cedar Point, Mathias Point, Neuse River, Northwest Point Royal Shoal, Ocracoke, Old Plantation Flats, Pamlico Point, Piney Point, Point Lookout, Point of Shoals, Pooles Island Lights, Roanoke Marshes, Seven-Foot Knoll, Solomons Lump, Smith Point, Stingray Point, Upper Cedar Point, Wade Point, Watts Island, and White Shoal lights .

Lighthouses were operated by lighthouse keepers, who kept the lanterns fueled, their wicks trimmed, and their lenses clean. Many lighthouses were inaccessible from land, so lighthouse keepers depended on lighthouse tenders for supplies. Jessamine was used to deliver food, water, coal, lantern fuel, and other supplies to lighthouses.

=== Public Safety ===
Jessamine assisted ships and people in danger when she came upon them during her cruises.

The passenger steamer Wakefield suffered an explosion in her steam plant on 30 October 1892 while ascending the Potomac River. Jessamine took off the wounded and a dozen passengers and landed them at Quantico, Virginia.

In 1901 Charles Davis was saved from drowning when he was lassoed by Captain Wyatt and pulled aboard Jessamine.

In 1905 a stevedore who was wheeling coal aboard Jessamine fell overboard. He hit his head during the fall, and was rescued by one of the tender's crew just as he was about to sink.

In 1910 the ship assisted the steamer Hampton Roads, which was aground in Mobjack Bay, Virginia.

In 1913 Jessamine assisted the schooner Alonzo Toulane, which was sinking.

in 1915 Jessamine towed the disabled gasoline tanker Margaret Atkinson to safety in Annapolis. Separately, she rescued two men whose boat had capsized.

In 1916 she towed the derelict schooner James H. Hargraves to port. In a separate event, she rescued a drowning man near the Love Point Light.

In 1917 she floated the schooner Jessie Irving ashore and in a separate incident saved a drowning man. She received a letter of commendation for her assistance to the schooner Otis Hubbard, which was caught in ice off Fort Carroll, Maryland on 16 December 1917.

In 1918 Jessamine assisted the gasoline tanker Speedway to refloat after grounding.

In 1920 she found the schooner Richmond frozen in ice and towed her to Annapolis.

In 1921 refloated the powerboat Maggie C. which had grounded on Bodkin Point Shoal, Maryland.

=== Accidents ===
Jessamine sailed in an age when the best navigation instruments were a sextant and lead-line. There were no electric lights aboard when she was launched, to say nothing of radar and GPS. Fog, rain, and darkness brought many ships of the day into collision with each other, and aground on unseen shores. While Jessamine frequently assisted others in these situations, she had her own accidents.

On 3 May 1883 the steam tug Samson lost steering control and ran into Jessamine's port bow, penetrating 15 feet into the tender. Jessamine was run up on shore to prevent her sinking, and temporary repairs were made. She sailed from Washington, D.C., where the accident took place, to Baltimore for permanent repairs at W. E. Woodall & Co.'s shipyard. Samson's captain had his license temporarily revoked and the U.S. government sued Samson's owner for $1,800 in damages.

The British steamship Thornhill collided with Jessamine off Fort Norfolk on 10 July 1885. Damage was slight.

Jessamine was dredging for oysters near the mouth of the West River in March 1885, and since there were a dozen open barrels on deck it appeared she was catching them for sale. Regrettably, the ship had no license for such a harvest, and her captain was ordered to appear before the Maryland State Fishery Force in Annapolis.

Jessamine was aground on Green Island for a week in March 1866 with a load of lumber on board for lights on the Roanoke River.

The wires which mechanically connected the telegraph from the bridge to the engine room aboard Jessamine stuck in position on 23 December 1898 as the ship was approaching a coal dock in Baltimore. In consequence, she did not slow, and ran into the stern of the schooner Harriet C. Kerlin which was already tied to the dock. The schooner was towed off for repairs, while Jessamine, with her iron hull intact, continued with her work.

The ship was moored at Baltimore on 28 March 1921 when the steamship West Lashaway was being moved in the harbor by tugs. The steamer's bow struck Jessamine on her starboard side, aft of the wheelhouse, and badly damaged the tender.

=== Use by Federal officials ===
Jessamine's proximity to Washington, D.C. led to frequent connections with the nation's leaders. Indeed, one newspaper account reported, "The Jessamine was used by presidents Harrison and McKinley as their yacht." While her heavy schedule of work and maintenance suggests that this was an exaggeration, there were indeed a number of events during her government service when she was used for what seemed the pleasure of high officials.

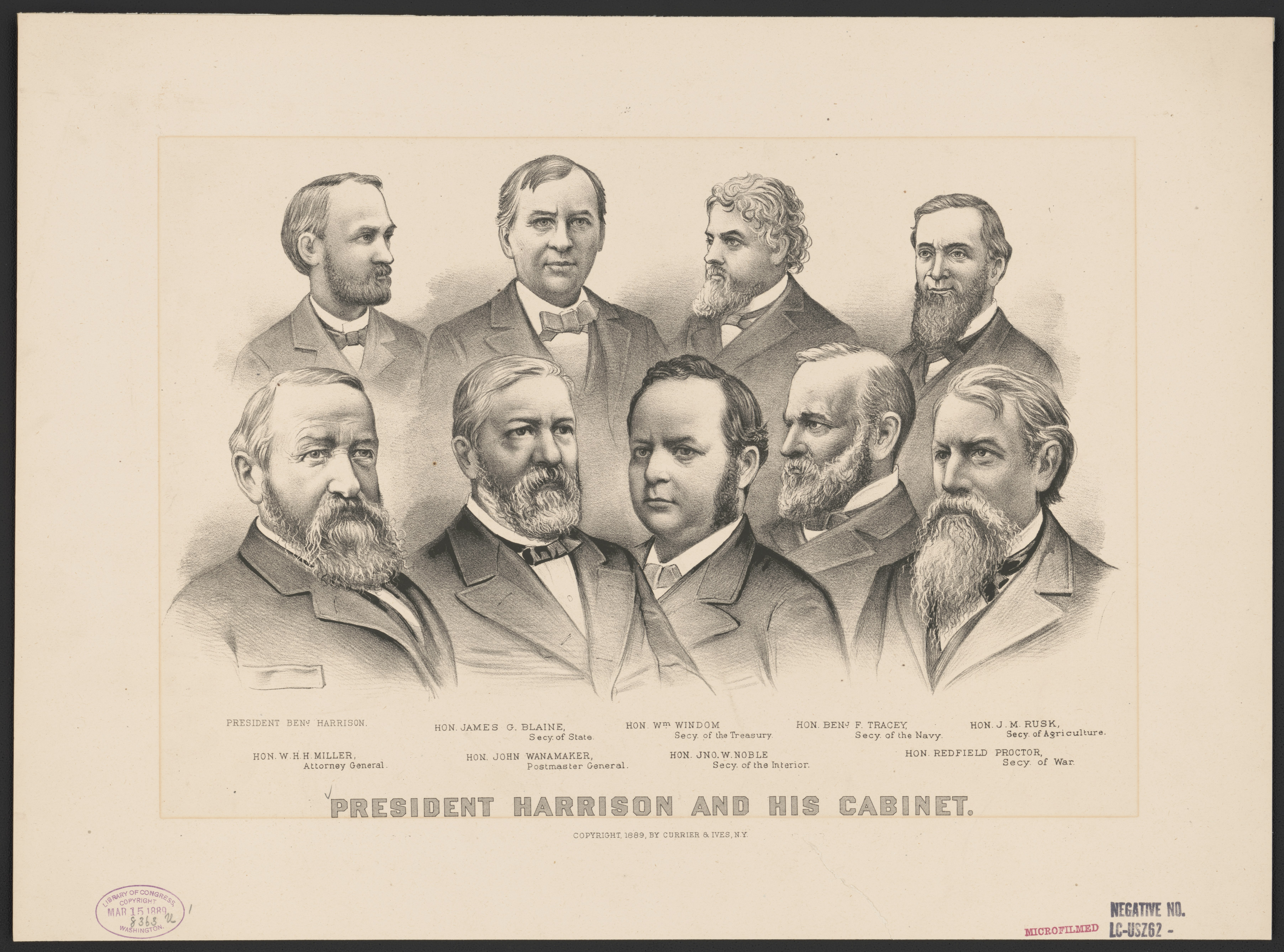
President Harrison, and Secretaries Rusk and Windom sailed aboard Jessamine

Jessamine carried Secretary of the Treasury William Windom, and Secretary of Agriculture Jeremiah Rusk from Fort Monroe to Washington, D.C. on 6 July 1890.

President Benjamin Harrison and his wife Caroline left Washington, D.C. for a cruise aboard Jessamine on 14 May 1892. They were accompanied by Mary Dimmick, who Harrison married after Caroline's death, and Lt. Parker and his wife, one of Caroline's nieces. The ship arrived at Hampton Roads on 15 May. Mrs. Harison's health was in decline at the time and the trip was thought to be salutary. The President and his party arrived back in Washington, D.C. on Jessamine on 19 May 1892 with the First Lady's health no better.

US Secretary of the Treasury Charles Foster and a party of friends took passage on Jessamine from Annapolis to Washington, D.C. in July 1893

In March 1899, Jessamine hosted Secretary of the Navy John Davis Long on an inspection of naval facilities and ships at Newport News. The Secretary was accompanied by his wife, daughter, and doctor.

Abner McKinley, brother of President McKinley, was aboard Jessamine for a cruise in February 1900. The announced purpose of this trip was to observe industrial and economic conditions in the South. McKinley was accompanied by his wife, daughter, and two friends.

On 9 August 1900, Jessamine was the setting for a dinner cruise on the Potomac for Secretary of War Elihu Root, Secretary of Agriculture James Wilson, Attorney General John W. Griggs, and Adjutant General Henry C. Corbin.

In January 1902 the ship hosted a duck and quail hunting party. The guests aboard included Dr. Henry S. Prichett, President of the Massachusetts Institute of Technology and a member of the Lighthouse Board, Lieutenant Colonel William A. Jones, Engineer of the 5th Lighthouse District, Congressman Charles F. Joy of Missouri, and Dr. Samuel J. Mixter, a Boston surgeon.

=== Notable events ===
Spencer Fullerton Baird, who at the time was Secretary of The Smithsonian Institution, authorized General Babcock to spend $100 to recover a sperm whale specimen from a carcass that washed ashore near Jupiter Inlet, Florida. Jessamine returned with the skeleton in April 1883.

The channels approaching Baltimore were mined with nitroglycerine mines during the Spanish-American War. Jessamine participated in both laying and later removing these mines after the defeat of the Spanish Navy in Cuba made invasion unlikely.

=== Obsolescence and retirement ===
In March 1911, Jessamine's engine broke down near Wolf Trap Light. She was towed back to Baltimore for repairs by her sistership USLHT Holly. A new crosshead was fabricated and installed to correct the problem. Her aged engine broke down again in June 1913, this time with a broken cylinder. She was towed back to Baltimore by USLHT Maple. On 30 March 1917 Jessamine's boiler exploded. Remarkably, none of the 23 crew aboard were injured because they were working on a buoy at the time. It was the end of August 1917 before her boiler was repaired and she was ready for sea.

With mechanical problems growing more frequent and costly, the Commissioner of Lighthouses began taking bids to replace Jessamine, which he described as, "worn out in service," as early as 1916. He asked for $180,000 to fund her replacement in 1916, and not having received an appropriation, asked again in 1917 for $200,000. In 1918 Congress authorized the construction of a replacement for Jessamine but failed to appropriate any money to fund the project. In 1919 the Commissioner increased the estimated cost of her replacement to $400,000. Finally on 5 June 1920, Congress acted to fund Jessamine's replacement. Jessamine was decommissioned on 20 May 1921. She was replaced by USLHT Hawthorne.

Jessamine was sold at auction to Charles A. Jording for $765 in on 1 March 1922.

== Commercial service ==
Jording sold the ship to the Peninsula Ferry Company, which changed her name to Queenstown. She was refit for her new service at the Rohde Shipyard, and began sailing as a passenger ferry between Baltimore, Love Point, and Queenstown on 7 May 1922. By August, Queenstown was sailing between Baltimore and Cambridge. The fare was $1. The Peninsula Ferry Company went bankrupt before the end of 1922.

Queenstown was arrested by the U.S. Marshals Service and sold at auction as part of the bankruptcy proceedings. She was sold to Robert T. Ford, who sold her to James H. Townsend on 3 November 1923.

=== Victor Lynn Transportation Company (1924–1930) ===
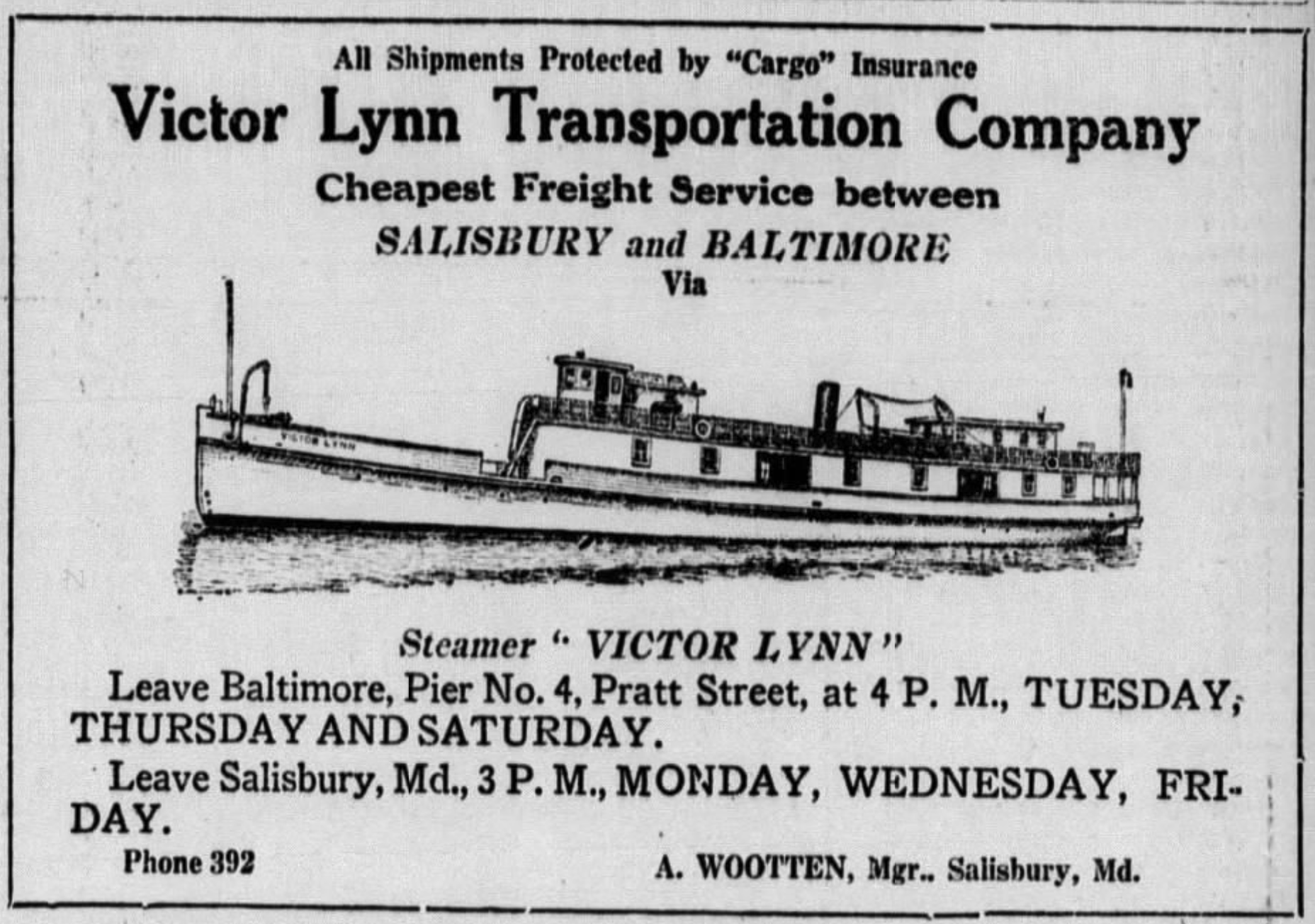
Victor Lynn, ex-Jessamine in 1927

In March 1924 the motor vessel Victor Lynn burned at Whitehaven on the Wicomico River. She had been the only vessel of the Victor Lynn Transportation Company, which had a regular freight line between Baltimore and Salisbury. In 1924 Queenstown was sold to the company's owner, Alphonso ("Al") Wootten, to replace the lost vessel and her name was changed to Victor Lynn. The ownership of the ship was transferred from Wootten to the Victor Lynn Transportation Company in October 1925.

Victor Lynn carried a variety of cargos in her new role as a freighter, including fresh strawberries, canned goods, sweet potatoes, and drums of oil. She had a cargo capacity of 450 tons.

The freighter collided with a tanker in dense fog on 17 January 1929. The tanker's anchor scraped Victor Lynn's port side. Damage was minimal and there were no injuries. The ship continued on to Salisbury under her own power.

Twenty-eight boys from a summer camp sailed in a 26-foot launch on a day trip to Annapolis on 1 August 1929. On the return trip to camp, the launch began to take on water, and bailing proved ineffective. Victor Lynn was able to rescue the boys from the launch, which sank shortly thereafter.

=== Red Star Lines (1930–1938) ===
In 1930 the Victor Lynn Transportation Company was purchased by Red Star Lines, Inc., an early transportation conglomerate of passenger bus, freight truck, and water shipping lines. In the immediate aftermath of the sale, Victor Lynn continued her Salisbury to Baltimore sailings. While on her way to Salisbury on 24 March 1934, about a mile south of the harbor, Victor Lynn ran hard aground on the east side of the river. Her cargo was loaded onto scows to lighten the ship so that she could be refloated. In December 1935, she faced another hazard in Salisbury when she was frozen in by ice on the Wicomico River. In June 1937, Victor Lynn sprang a leak, perhaps after hitting an obstruction, as she approached Mt. Vernon on the Wicomico River. Her pumps were unable to keep up with the flooding, so her captain drove her into shallow water to prevent her from sinking. Her deck was almost awash when she came to rest. After emergency repairs, she was towed to Baltimore for repairs in drydock. A new wooden hull was built around her old steel hull plates in a job that was expected to take two and a half months.

Red Star Lines went bankrupt in 1938. Victor Lynn continued her sailings between Salisbury and Baltimore under receivership until the Red Star Lines' assets were taken over by a newly formed corporation, Victor Lynn Lines, Inc. in March 1939.

=== Victor Lynn Lines (1939–1957) ===
New management initially continued to sail Victor Lynn on her Salisbury to Baltimore route. World War II brought about a shipping shortage in the Caribbean and freight rates rose significantly. To take advantage of these higher rates, in the summer of 1943 Victor Lynn was assigned to the Miami – Haiti route, and operated as the "Miami Line". She carried bananas, up to 1,000 bunches per trip, on this route. She returned to Maryland to avoid the hurricane season in September 1944. She was placed, once again, on the Baltimore-Salisbury route.

On 17 December 1954, Victor Lynn sailed for the last time from Baltimore to Salisbury. This was not only the last trip for the ship, but the last water service trip of Victor Lynn Lines, and the last regularly scheduled water trip of any shipping line between Baltimore and Maryland's Eastern Shore. The development of highways and bridges had made such transport uneconomical.

=== Loss of Victor Lynn (1959) ===
In 1957 the ship left U.S. registry. She was sold to Harold Kent of Tampa, Florida who reflagged her as a Honduran ship. Victor Lynn was under contract with Kent Fruit Importing Co. to haul bananas, this time between Coatzacoalcos, Mexico and Brownsville, Texas. Returning empty from Brownsville on 18 October 1959, she sank roughly 20 miles from Coatzacoalcos. Her captain reported that she developed a leak in her No. 1 hold that could not be controlled, and he ordered the ship abandoned. She sank about 20 minutes afterward. All but one of her 11-man crew was saved.
