= List of lighthouses in Maryland =

This is a list of all lighthouses in the U.S. state of Maryland as identified by the United States Coast Guard. There are fourteen active lights in the state as well as three automated caissons and eleven skeleton towers replacing previously staffed lights.

The first lighthouse in the state was lit in 1822 and the last in 1965 (ignoring automated towers erected later); the oldest surviving structure is the Pooles Island Light and the oldest still active is the Cove Point Light. The tallest extant tower is the Craighill Channel Lower Range Rear Light.

If not otherwise noted, focal height and coordinates are taken from the United States Coast Guard Light List, while location and dates of activation, automation, and deactivation are taken from the United States Coast Guard Historical information site for lighthouses. Locations of demolished lights have been estimated using National Oceanic and Atmospheric Administration (NOAA) navigational charts.

| Name | Image | Location | Coordinates | Year first lit | Automated | Year deactivated | Current Lens | Focal Height |
|---|---|---|---|---|---|---|---|---|
| Baltimore Harbor Light | | Chesapeake Bay | 39.05919°N 76.399°W | 1908 | 1923 | Active | Unknown | 52 ft (16 m) |
| Blakistone Island Light | Rebuilt Blackistone Lighthouse | Coltons Point (St. Clement's) | 38.2074°N 76.7449°W | 1851 | 1932 | 1956 (Destroyed, rebuilt as a replica) | Decorative | Unknown |
| Bloody Point Bar Light | | Kent Island | 38.8338°N 76.3917°W | 1882 | 1961 | Active | Acrylic | 54 ft (16 m) |
| Bodkin Island Light | | Patapsco River (Mouth) | 39°08′2.4″N 76°25′37.2″W | 1822 | Never | 1856 (Destroyed in 1914) | None | Unknown |
| Cedar Point Light | | Patuxent River (Mouth) | 39°17′57.12″N 76°23′9.6″W | 1896 | Never | 1928 (Dismantled in 1996) | None | Unknown |
| Choptank River Light | | Tred Avon River (Mouth) | 38.6555°N 76.1855°W | 1871 (First); 1921 (Last); 2012 (Replica) | Never | 1964 (Dismantled) | Fifth-order Fresnel (Inside replica) | Unknown |
| Clay Island Light | | Nanticoke River (Mouth) | 38.234°N 75.970°W | 1832 | Never | 1892 (Destroyed in 1894) | None | 36 ft (11 m) |
| Cobb Point Bar Light | | Cobb Island | 38.2424°N 76.8266°W | 1889 | Never | 1940 (Demolished after fire) | None | Unknown |
| Concord Point Light | | Havre de Grace | 39.5407°N 76.0848°W | 1827 | 1920 | Active (Inactive: 1975-1983) | Fifth-order Fresnel | 36 ft (11 m) |
| Cove Point Light | Cove Point Light | Solomons | 38.3863°N 76.3817°W | 1828 | 1986 | Active | Unknown | 38 ft (12 m) |
| Craighill Channel Lower Range; Front Light | | Edgemere | 39.1886°N 76.3945°W | 1875 | 1964 | Active | Unknown | 25 ft (7.6 m) |
| Craighill Channel Lower Range; Rear Light | | Edgemere | 39.2291°N 76.3942°W | 1875 | 1923 | Active | Unknown | 105 ft (32 m) |
| Craighill Channel Upper Range; Front Light | | Edgemere | 39.1971°N 76.4482°W | 1886 | 1914 | Active | Unknown | 15 ft (4.6 m) |
| Craighill Channel Upper Range; Rear Light | | Edgemere (Sparrows Point) | 39°12′58.32″N 76°27′45.72″W | 1886 | 1933 | Active | Unknown | 64 ft (20 m) |
| Drum Point Light | Drum Point Light | Solomons (Originally at Drum Point) | 38.319°N 76.421°W(approximate original); 38.331°N 76.463°W (current) | 1883 | 1960 (Semi) | 1962 (Now a museum) | None | 25 ft (7.6 m) |
| Fishing Battery Light | Fishing Battery Light | Havre de Grace | 39.495°N 76.083°W | 1853 | 1917 | 1921 (Replaced with skeleton tower) | None | Unknown |
| Fog Point Light | | Smith Island | 38.0299°N 76.0417°W | 1827 | Never | 1875 (Later destroyed) | None | Unknown |
| Fort Carroll Light | Fort Carroll Light | Baltimore | 39°12′52.92″N 76°31′11.64″W | 1854 (Former); 1900 (Current) | 1923 | 1964 (Vandalized) | None | 45 ft (14 m) |
| Fort Washington Light | Fort Washington Light | Fort Washington | 38°42′44.3″N 77°2′12.8″W | 1857 (Former); 1901 (Current) | Unknown | Active | Unknown | Unknown |
| Great Shoals Light | | Wicomico River (Mouth) | 38.2143°N 75.8794°W | 1882 | Never | 1966 | None | 37 ft (11 m) |
| Greenbury Point Light (First) | | Annapolis | 38.975°N 76.455°W | 1848 | Never | 1891 (Eventually collapsed) | None | 39 ft (12 m) |
| Greenbury Point Shoal Light (Second) | | Annapolis | 38.968°N 76.454°W | 1892 | Never | 1934 (Replaced with skeleton tower) | None | Unknown |
| Hawkins Point Light | Hawkins Point Light | Baltimore | 39.2079°N 76.5326°W | 1868 | Never | 1924 (Replaced with skeleton tower) | None | 28 ft (8.5 m) |
| Holland Island Bar Light | | Holland Island | 38.0687°N 76.0959°W | 1889 | Never | 1960 (Demolished) | None | 42 ft (13 m) |
| Hooper Island Light | Hooper Island Light | Hooper's Island | 38.256°N 76.250°W | 1902 | 1961 | Active | Unknown | 63 ft (19 m) |
| Hooper Strait Light | | Saint Michaels (Originally Hooper's Island) | 38.2267°N 76.0756°W (Original); 38.7875°N 76.2192°W (Current) | 1867 (Former); 1879 (Current) | 1954 | 1966 (Now a museum) | None | Unknown |
| Janes Island Light | | Crisfield | 37.9633°N 75.9185°W | 1867 (Former); 1879 (Current) | Never | 1935 (Destroyed by ice) | None | 38 ft (12 m) |
| Lazaretto Point Light | | Baltimore | 39.2622°N 76.5715°W | 1831 | Never | 1926 (Demolished, rebuilt as a replica) | None | Unknown |
| Leading Point Light | | Baltimore | 39.2137°N 76.5518°W | 1868 | Never | 1924 (Later demolished) | None | Unknown |
| Love Point Light | | Kent Island | 39.0539°N 76.2904°W | 1872 | 1953 | 1964 (Demolished) | None | Unknown |
| Lower Cedar Point Light | | Potomac River | 38.340°N 76.993°W | 1867 (First); 1896 (Last) | Never | 1951 (Replaced with skeleton tower) | None | Unknown |
| Maryland Point Light | | Potomac River | 38.3495°N 77.1975°W | 1892 | 1954 | 1963 (Dismantled) | None | Unknown |
| Mathias Point Light | | Potomac River | 38.4051°N 77.0428°W | 1876 | 1951 | 1961 (Dismantled) | None | Unknown |
| North Point Range Lights | | Baltimore | 39.1940°N 76.4419°W (Front Light); 39.1971°N 76.4482°W (Rear Light) | 1822 | Never | 1873 (Collapsed, replaced by Craighill Channel range lights) | None | 34 ft (10 m) (Front); 40 ft (12 m) (Rear) |
| Piney Point Light | | Piney Point | 38.1355°N 76.5297°W | 1836 | Never | 1964 | None | 34 ft (10 m) |
| Point Lookout Light | | Point Lookout | 38.0387°N 76.3221°W | 1830 | Never | 1965 | None | 41 ft (12 m) |
| Point No Point Light | | Chesapeake Bay | 38.128°N 76.29°W | 1905 | 1938 | Active | 375mm | 52 ft (16 m) |
| Pooles Island Light | | Aberdeen | 39.279°N 76.270°W | 1825 | 1917 | Active (Inactive: 1939-2011) | Unknown | 38 ft (12 m) |
| Ragged Point Light | | Potomac River | 38.1544°N 76.6014°W | 1910 | Never | 1962 (Dismantled) | None | Unknown |
| Sandy Point Shoal Light | | Skidmore | 39.016°N 76.385°W | 1858 (Former); 1883 (Current) | 1963 | Active | Unknown | 51 ft (16 m) |
| Seven Foot Knoll Light | | Baltimore (Originally in the Patapsco River) | 39.1551°N 76.4091°W (Original); 39.2836°N 76.6054°W (Current) | 1855 | 1948 | 1988 (Now an onshore museum) | Decorative | 40 ft (12 m) |
| Sharkfin Shoal Light | | Nanticoke River (Mouth) | 38.2020°N 75.9868°W | 1892 | Never | 1964 (Dismantled) | None | Unknown |
| Sharps Island Light | | Saint Michaels | 38.6391°N 76.3758°W | 1838 (First); 1882 (Current) | 1951 | 2010 | 250mm | 54 ft (16 m) |
| Solomons Lump Light | | Princess Anne | 38.04806°N 76.01502°W | 1875 (Former); 1895 (Current) | 1950 | Active | Unknown | 47 ft (14 m) |
| Somers Cove Light | | Crisfield | 37.9665°N 75.8775°W | 1867 | Never | 1932 (Dismantled) | None | Unknown |
| Thomas Point Shoal Light | | Annapolis | 38.899°N 76.436°W | 1825 (Former); 1875 (Current) | 1986 | Active | 250mm | 43 ft (13 m) |
| Turkey Point Light | | Elkton | 39°26′59.578″N 76°0′30.313″W | 1833 | 1947 | Active (Inactive: 2000-2002) | Unknown | Unknown |
| Upper Cedar Point Light | | Potomac River | 38.4027°N 77.0826°W | 1867 | 1963 | 1963 (Dismantled) | None | Unknown |
