= USS Resolute (1860) =

Gunboat of the United States Navy

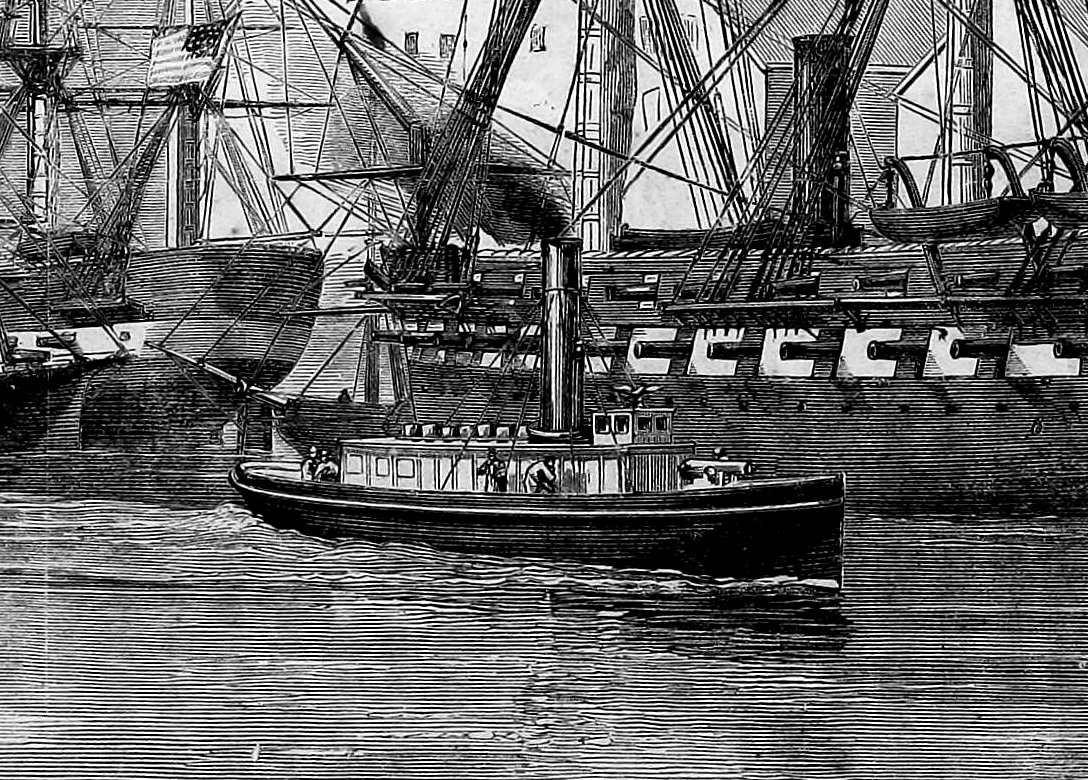
- USS Resolute at the Brooklyn Navy Yard, June 1861

History

United States
- Namesake: Resolute: marked by firm determination; resolved (previous name retained)
- Launched: 1860
- Acquired: 7 May 1861
- Commissioned: 12 May 1861
- Decommissioned: 26 May 1865
- Fate: Sold, 24 June 1865

General characteristics
- Displacement: 90 tons
- Length: 88 ft 2 in (26.87 m) (reg.)
- Beam: 17 ft (5.2 m)
- Depth of hold: 7 ft 5 in (2.26 m)
- Propulsion: steam engine, screw propelled
- Speed: 10 knots (19 km/h; 12 mph)
- Complement: 17
- Armament: one 24-pounder howitzer, one 12-pounder howitzer

The first USS Resolute was a steamer acquired by the Union Navy during the American Civil War.

She was purchased by the Union Navy to be part of the fleet of ships stationed in coastal waterways to prevent blockade runners from entering or departing ports of the Confederacy. She served as a gunboat and, at times, as a ship's tender and, at war's end, was sold at auction.

== Service history ==
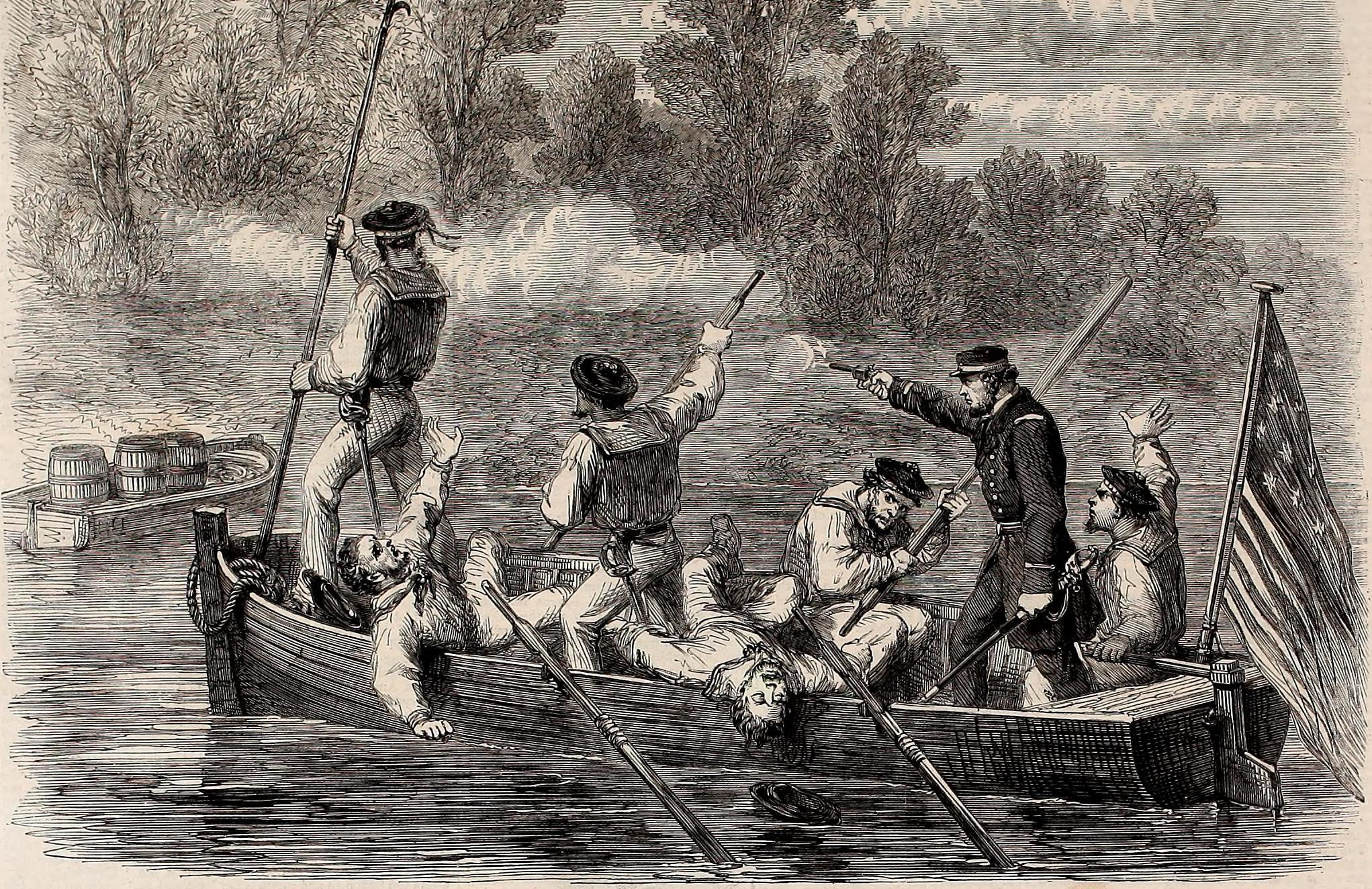
Confederates trapping a Boat's Crew from the Resolute of the Potomac Fleet, in 1861

Resolute, a wooden, screw tug built in 1860 at Keyport, New Jersey, was purchased by the Navy 7 May 1861 from A. Degroot of New York City; and commissioned 12 May 1861, Acting Master William Budd (1829–1907) in command. Assigned to the Union Navy's Potomac Flotilla, Resolute went into action 29 May 1861 in company with USS Thomas Freeborn, USS Anacostia, and Navy landing parties against Confederate shore batteries at Aquia Creek, Virginia. While returning from a voyage up the Potomac River to make topographical observations with Capt. W. R. Palmer, USA, on board, Resolute captured and burned the schooner Somerset 8 June 1861 in Breton Bay. While patrolling upriver 7 July, she encountered and successfully swept two Confederate moored mines, among the first of their kind used in the Civil War. The enterprising tug captured the coaster Ocean Wave 18 July 1861 after a long chase off the mouth of the Great Wicomico River but lost three killed and one wounded 15 August when her boat unsuccessfully attempted to capture a Confederate boat at Lower Cedar Point, Virginia.

Resolute destroyed four boats 31 August 1861 inshore at Ferry Landing, Virginia; captured the schooner Jones 11 August 1862 and the sloop Capitola 8 November 1862; and during mid-July 1863, operated close inshore in company with USS Jacob Bell and USS Racer under fire of Confederate shore batteries at Mathias Point to protect unloading operations from the grounded Army transport George Peabody. Resolute patrolled St. Inigoes Creek, St. Mary's River, St. George's Creek, and the mouth of the Rappahannock River, into 1864. From August to October 1864, she acted as ship's tender to the coast defense monitor USS Roanoke (1855) anchored off Point Lookout, Maryland. Subsequently, under major overhaul 12 October 1864 to 11 January 1865 at Washington Navy Yard, Resolute returned to the Potomac Flotilla to resume cruising duty. Steaming largely off Cockpit Point, Liverpool Point, and between Sandy Point and Indian Head,

Resolute returned to Washington Navy Yard at war's end and was decommissioned 26 May 1865. Resolute was sold 24 June 1865 at Washington, D.C., to T. J. Southard. Redocumented 8 July 1865, she remained in merchant service until abandoned in 1899.

== See also ==
- Union Blockade
