= Cedar Point Light =

Cedar Point Light may refer to:

- Cedar Point Light (Maryland), at the mouth of the Patuxent River, Chesapeake Bay, Maryland
- Lower Cedar Point Light, in the Potomac River, Maryland
- Upper Cedar Point Light, in the Potomac River, Maryland
- Cedar Point Light (Ohio), listed on the NRHP in Ohio
