= Cedar Point Light (Maryland) =

Lighthouse in Maryland, United States

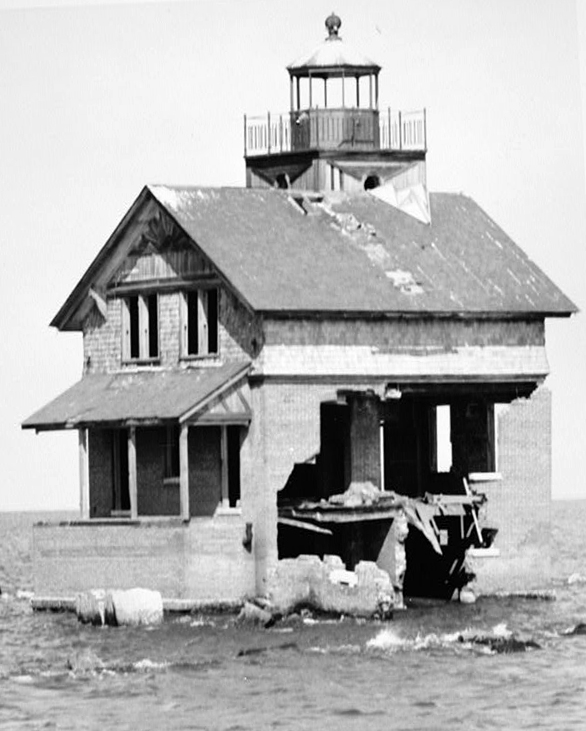
- Cedar Point Light before demolition in 1981
- Location: Cedar Point at the mouth of the Patuxent River
- Coordinates: 38°17′58″N 76°22′04″W

Tower
- Construction: brick
- Height: 45 feet (14 m)
- Shape: House with tower on roof

Light
- First lit: 1896
- Deactivated: 1920
- Lens: fourth-order Fresnel lens
- Range: 7 nautical miles (13 km; 8.1 mi)
- Characteristic: 5 sec red flash

The Cedar Point Light was the last house-type lighthouse built in the Chesapeake Bay. An early victim of shoreline erosion, the cupola and gables are preserved at museums.

This light should not be confused with Upper Cedar Point Light or Lower Cedar Point Light, both of which stood in the Potomac River. Location: Solomons, Maryland marks the southern side of the mouth of Patuxent River (GPS coordinates corrected and approximate).

== History ==
Cedar Point did not receive a light until 1896, based upon an 1888 request from the lighthouse board and an appropriation in 1894. A two-story brick house was constructed with an attached tower, by far the latest example of such construction on the Chesapeake Bay. Erosion at the point was exacerbated by dredging for sand nearby, and in the 1920s the light sat on a tiny island, leading to its abandonment in 1928 in favor of a beacon. This beacon was eventually abandoned as well in the mid 1950s, leaving on a buoy in deeper water off the point. The land at the point was acquired by the United States Navy in 1958.

The lighthouse was declared eligible for the National Register of Historic Places in 1979, and three years later the cupola was removed and taken to the base museum at the Patuxent Naval Air Station. Demolition was approved, and the heavily damaged remains were dismantled in 1996, with the gables and some bricks sent to the Calvert Marine Museum for the construction of a pavilion. Only some of the foundation remains at the original site.

== See also ==
- List of lighthouses in Maryland
- Lighthouses in the United States
