= Cedar Point (disambiguation) =

Cedar Point is an amusement park in Sandusky, Ohio, in the United States.

Cedar Point may also refer to:

== Places ==
Canada

- Cedar Point, Ontario, one of two communities in Ontario
- Cedar Point Provincial Park, named after the eponymous point on Quesnel Lake in British Columbia's Cariboo region

United States

- Cedar Point, Illinois
- Cedar Point, Kosciusko County, Indiana
- Cedar Point, Kansas
- Cedar Point, North Carolina
- Cedar Point (Elkin, North Carolina), listed on the National Register of Historical Places in Surry County, North Carolina
- Cedar Point County Park, East Hampton, New York
- Cedar Point State Park, Cape Vincent, New York

== See also ==
- Cedar Point Light (disambiguation)
- Cedar Point National Wildlife Refuge, Ohio
- Cedar Point Nursery v. Hassid, a 2021 United States Supreme Court case involving eminent domain
