= Bodkin Island Light =

Lighthouse in Maryland, United States

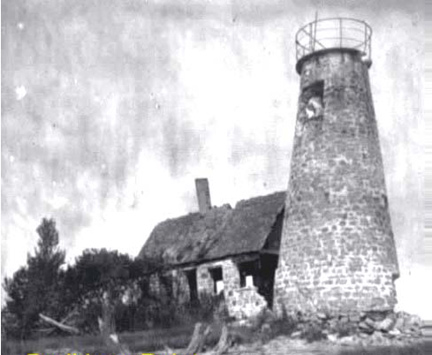
- Bodkin Island Light after abandonment
- Location: Off Bodkin Point at the mouth of the Patapsco River
- Coordinates: 39°08′02″N 76°25′37″W

Tower
- Constructed: 1821
- Construction: stone masonry
- Height: 35 feet (11 m)
- Shape: conical tower

Light
- First lit: 1822
- Deactivated: 1856 then later destroyed by erosion

The Bodkin Island Light (or Bodkin Point Light) was a lighthouse on the Chesapeake Bay, United States, the first erected in Maryland.

== History ==
The lighthouse was constructed as an aid to shipping entering Baltimore; it was built on Bodkin Island (not to be confused with an island of the same name located south of Kent Island), and was the first lighthouse in Maryland. The station was built by Thomas Evans and William Coppeck, who completed the 35-foot (11 m) stone tower and attached one-story keeper's dwelling in October 1821. Thirteen lamps were purchased from Winslow Lewis, and the station was formally inaugurated in January 1822.

The lighthouse was plagued by problems stemming from its poor construction during much of its brief existence, and it was replaced in 1856 by the Seven Foot Knoll Light in the Patapsco River. A fisherman is said to have lived in the dwelling for a time, but eventually the island was completely abandoned; the old tower collapsed in 1914. Today, Bodkin Island has disappeared, eaten away by erosion. What remains of the site is marked as a "navigational hazard" on sea charts.

== See also ==
- List of lighthouses in Maryland
- List of lighthouses in the United States
