= Greenbury Point Light =

Lighthouse in Maryland, United States

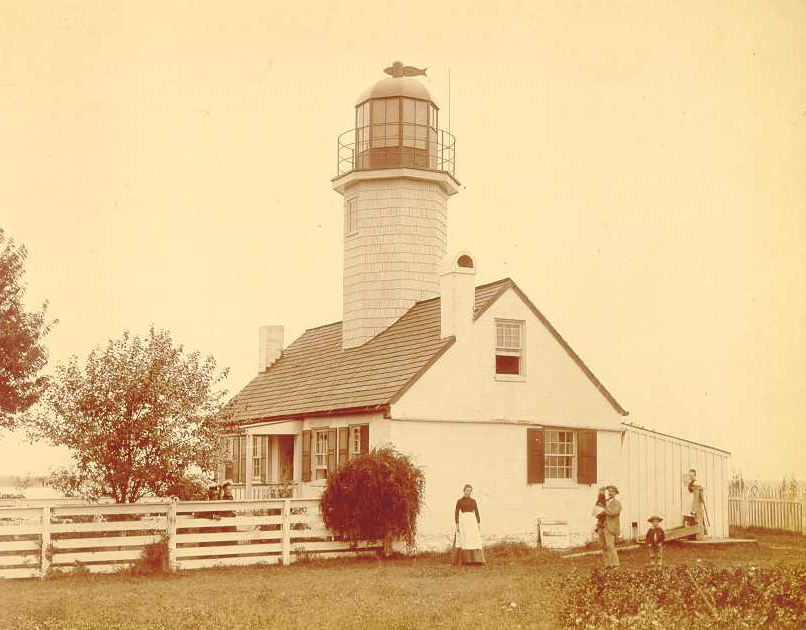
- Greenbury Point Light in 1885 (USCG)
- Location: Greenbury Point at the mouth of the Severn River in Annapolis, Maryland
- Coordinates: 38.975°N 76.455°W (approximate)

Tower
- Construction: wood frame
- Shape: house with tower on roof

Light
- First lit: 1848
- Deactivated: 1891
- Lens: sixth order Fresnel lens
- 1892 light
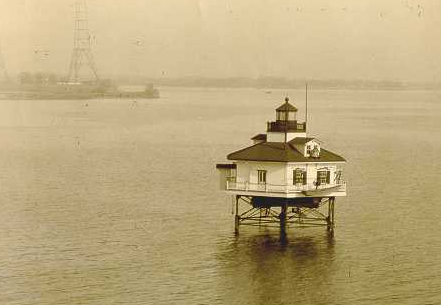
- Greenbury Point Light in 1925 (USCG). Greenbury Point lies in the upper left of the picture.
- Foundation: screw-pile
- Construction: wood frame
- Height: 39 ft (12 m)
- Shape: hexagonal house
- First lit: 1892
- Deactivated: 1934
- Lens: fourth order Fresnel lens
- Characteristic: F W

Greenbury Point Light was the name of two lighthouses in the Chesapeake Bay, both located at the mouth of the Severn River in Annapolis, Maryland.

== History ==
The first light on this site was constructed in 1848 and bears little resemblance to other lights in the area. Original equipped with Argand lamps and reflectors, it was upgraded in 1855 with a sixth order Fresnel lens, later replaced with a fourth order lens. By 1878 the Lighthouse Board was reporting that erosion at the point threatened the light, and that it was ill-located and too small to be seen against the lights of the town. An appropriation to replace the light was made in 1889, and in 1892 a new screw-pile lighthouse was activated. This sat on the shoal about half a mile south of the point, and was assigned the new station name of "Greenbury Point Shoal Light".

Like many such lights in the bay, the screwpile foundation proved vulnerable to ice, and in 1918 it was badly damaged. In 1934 the house was removed and a skeleton tower erected on the piles. This light is still in use.
