= Craney Island Light =

Lighthouse in Virginia, United States

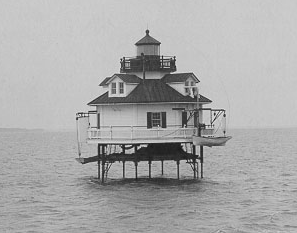
- Undated photograph of Craney Island Light (USCG)
- Location: just east of Craney Island at the mouth of the Elizabeth River
- Coordinates: 36.892°N 76.337°W (approx.)

Tower
- Foundation: screw-pile
- Construction: cast-iron/wood
- Height: 36 feet (11 m)
- Shape: square house (first); hexagonal house (second)

Light
- First lit: 1859 (first); 1884 (second)
- Deactivated: 1936
- Lens: fifth-order Fresnel lens

The Craney Island Light was a screwpile lighthouse located just east of Craney Island at the mouth of the Elizabeth River in Virginia. This light replaced the first permanently stationed lightship in the United States.

== History ==
Craney Island forms the west side of the entrance to Norfolk's harbor and has been used as a military facility since the War of 1812. In 1820 a lightship was stationed off its eastern side to protect the edge of the channel. This ship had previously been stationed off Willoughby's Shoal, but was quickly moved after it was determined that the first location was too exposed. This was the first permanent lightship station in the country; it was replaced in 1859 by the first of two screw-pile lights, a square house which survived until 1884. In that year the decrepit structure was replaced with a new hexagonal house, which in turn was removed in 1936, to be replaced by an automated light on the old foundation. In the early 1970s the light was completely removed and replaced by a buoy. Although not a historical name for the ship or station, a lightship named Portsmouth commemorates the first lightship at Craney Island at the Portsmouth Naval Shipyard Museum in Portsmouth, Virginia.
