= Somers Cove Light =

Lighthouse in Maryland, United States

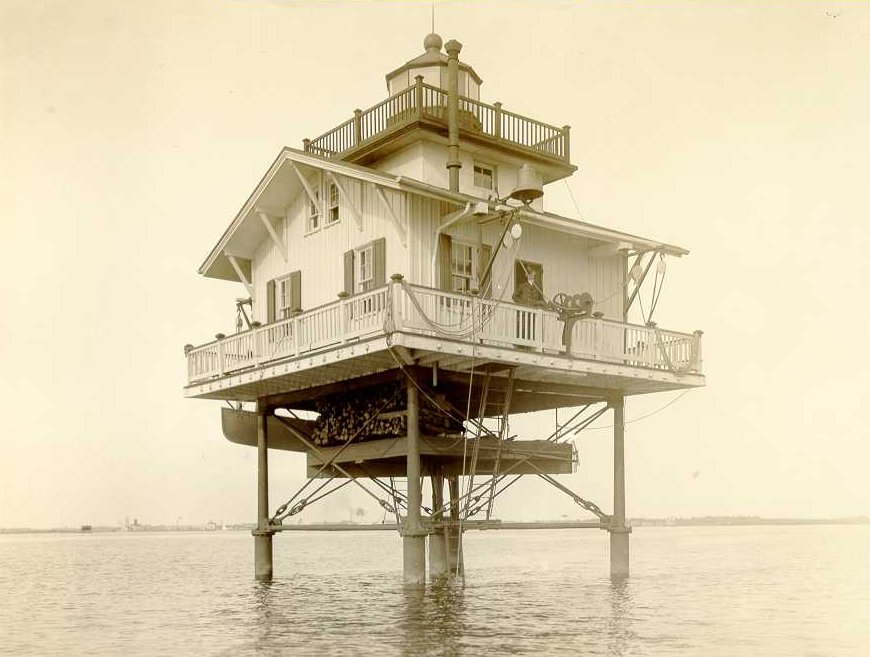
- 1915 photograph of Somers Cove Light, Maryland (USCG)
- Location: at the mouth of the Little Annemessex River, SW of Crisfield, Maryland
- Coordinates: 37°57′59″N 75°52′39″W

Tower
- Constructed: 1867
- Foundation: screw-pile
- Construction: cast-iron/wood
- Shape: square house

Light
- First lit: 1867
- Deactivated: 1932
- Lens: sixth order Fresnel lens
- 1932 lighthouse
- First lit: 1932
- Deactivated: 2005

The Somers Cove Light was a screw-pile lighthouse located near Crisfield, Maryland. Dismantled early, its remains are a landmark to watermen in the area.

== History ==
Little is known about this minor light, other than that it was constructed in 1867 to at the cost of $10,000 (equivalent to $225,000 in 2024). Unlike many other screw-pile lighthouses it was apparently never threatened by ice, and thus passed a quiet life until it was dismantled in 1932, replaced by a skeleton tower. The ferry to Tangier Island passes its remains.

On October 26, 2021, the remains of the light collapsed during a storm.
