= Lambert Point Light =

Former lighthouse in Virginia, United States

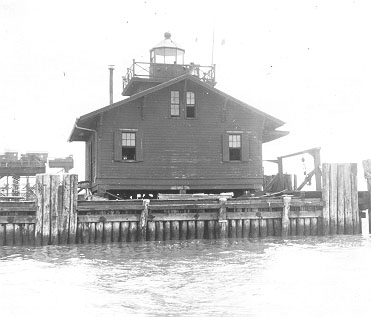
- Undated photograph of Lambert Point Light (USCG)
- Location: Elizabeth River southeast of Norfolk, Virginia, U.S.
- Coordinates: 36.875°N 76.331°W (approx.)

Tower
- Foundation: screw-pile
- Construction: cast-iron/wood
- Shape: square house

Light
- First lit: 1872
- Deactivated: 1911
- Lens: fifth-order Fresnel lens
- Characteristic: red

The Lambert Point Light was a small screwpile lighthouse at Lambert's Point in Norfolk, Virginia, United States; it was built in 1872.

The lighthouse was meant to serve the increased shipping traffic on the Elizabeth River, and initially was designed with six piles. The plans were changed when five surplus piles were found; in the end the structure was square, and sat on these five piles. The building was painted brown, and showed a red light from a fifth-order Fresnel lens.

Within a few months the lighthouse had settled more than 1 foot (30 cm) on one side. The reason was never discovered, but it was believed that the missing sixth pile might have contributed to the problem. Eventually the structure sat at a tilt, with the west side about 14 inches (36 cm) lower than the east. To stabilize the building, more piles were added to the foundation; at this time a dock and pier were added to the station.

The lighthouse gradually became useless due to construction at the point, and eventually it was surrounded by piers and warehouses built by the Norfolk and Western Railroad. It was eventually suggested that a new lighthouse be built at Bush's Bluff, some miles upriver, and that this might supersede the light at Lambert's Point. This project failed, however, because a new lighthouse was deemed too expensive. The Lambert Point Light was finally extinguished on December 31, 1892, the same year that Bush's Bluff was marked with a lightvessel. The fog signal at the station was reestablished in 1901, and served for the next 10 years. The building eventually collapsed sometime around 1911, and no trace of it remains.
