= Wade Point Light =

Lighthouse in North Carolina, US

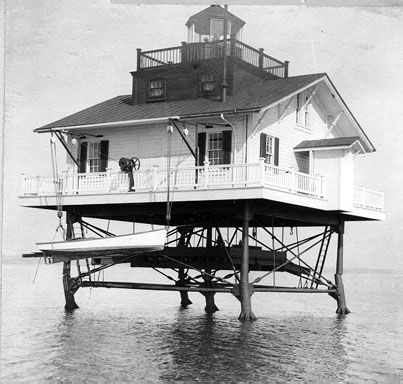
- Wade Point Light (USCG)
- Location: Entrance to Pasquotank River, North Carolina
- Coordinates: 36.1561°N 75.9778°W

Tower
- Foundation: screw-pile
- Construction: cast-iron/wood
- Height: 39 feet (12 m)
- Shape: square house

Light
- First lit: 1855
- Lens: fourth-order Fresnel lens
- Characteristic: fixed white

The Wade Point Light was a screw-pile lighthouse in North Carolina.

== History ==
Lightship "M" was stationed at the mouth of the Pasquotank River off Albemarle Sound beginning in 1826. In 1855 it was replaced by a square screw-pile structure . This structure was eventually removed and replaced with the Pasquotank River Entrance Light, an automated tower about two miles NNE of the previous light.
