= Great Shoals Light =

Lighthouse in Maryland, United States

- Location: mouth of the Wicomico River in the Chesapeake Bay
- Coordinates: 38.2143°N 75.8794°W

Tower
- Constructed: 1884
- Foundation: screw-pile
- Construction: cast-iron/wood
- Height: 37 feet (11 m)
- Shape: square house

Light
- First lit: 1884
- Deactivated: 1966
- Focal height: 11 m (36 ft)
- Lens: fifth-order Fresnel lens
- Characteristic: Fl W 6s

Great Shoals Light was a screw-pile lighthouse in the Chesapeake Bay at the mouth of the Wicomico River.

== History ==
This light was constructed to mark a narrow channel at the entrance to the Wicomico River, as requested by the Maryland General Assembly in 1882. An appropriation was not made until the following year, and further delays pushed the commissioning date to August 1884.

In 1966 the light was dismantled and a modern automated light was erected on the old foundation.
