= Janes Island Light =

Lighthouse in Maryland, United States

- Location: Tangier Sound southwest of Janes Island (near Crisfield, Maryland)
- Coordinates: 37.9633°N 75.9185°W

Tower
- Foundation: screw-pile
- Construction: cast-iron/wood
- Height: 38 ft
- Shape: hexagonal house

Light
- First lit: 1867 (second light in 1879)
- Deactivated: 1935
- Lens: fourth-order Fresnel lens

The Janes Island Light was a screw-pile lighthouse located near Crisfield in the U.S. state of Maryland. Twice destroyed by ice, it was replaced in 1935 with an automated beacon.

== History ==
Janes Island (also sometimes called James Island) has a shoal jutting out into Tangier Sound from its southwest point. The shoal was marked with lightships beginning in 1853, and in 1866 a screw-pile light was erected on the spot. It was destroyed by ice in 1879, and a new light was constructed to replace it, identical to the second Hooper Strait Light. The new light was damaged by ice in 1893, and in 1935 the house was torn from the foundation and floated in the sound for three days before sinking. A new beacon was constructed, a short tower on a caisson foundation, and it has remained in service since.
