= Love Point Light =

Lighthouse in Maryland, United States

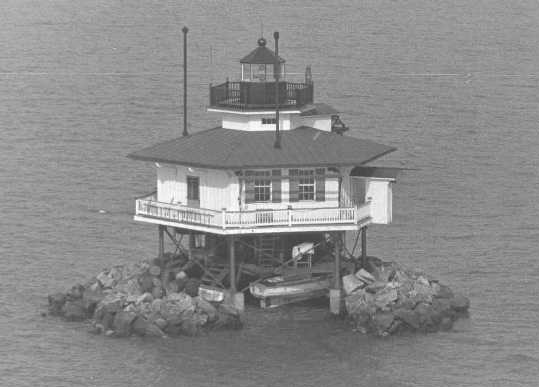
- Undated photograph of Love Point Light (USCG)
- Location: off northern tip of Kent Island, Maryland in the Chesapeake Bay
- Coordinates: 39.0539°N 76.2904°W

Tower
- Constructed: 1872
- Foundation: screw-pile
- Construction: cast-iron/wood
- Automated: 1953
- Shape: hexagonal house

Light
- First lit: 1872
- Deactivated: 1964
- Focal height: 10.5 m (34 ft)
- Lens: 3½-order Fresnel lens
- Characteristic: six second white flashing with red sector

Love Point Light was a screw-pile lighthouse in the Chesapeake Bay, off the northern end of Kent Island, Maryland.

== History ==
Local pressure to build a light at this site was noted as early as 1837, but an appropriation in 1857 was insufficient, and it was not until 1872 that a light was constructed, using the same plan as the original Choptank River Light. As with many screw-pile structures, it had several run-ins with ice, with several pilings being damaged in its first winter. It was threatened again in 1879, but escaped further damage.

Automation and dismantling followed the pattern of other screw-pile lights in the bay; it was automated in 1953 and the house removed in 1964, replaced by a small light and fog bell on the old foundation.
