= Roanoke Marshes Light =

Lighthouse in North Carolina, US

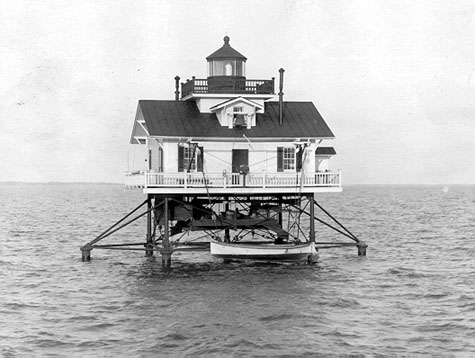
- Roanoke Marshes Light (USCG)
- Location: South end of Croatan Sound, North Carolina
- Coordinates: 35°48′40″N 75°42′02″W

Tower
- Foundation: Screw-pile
- Construction: cast-iron/wood
- Height: 37 feet (11 m)
- Shape: square house

Light
- First lit: 1877
- Deactivated: 1955
- Lens: fourth-order Fresnel lens
- Characteristic: fixed white with red sector

Roanoke Marshes Light was a screw-pile lighthouse in North Carolina, United States.

== History ==
Little is recorded about this light, which was replaced in 1955 with an automated light on a shorter tower. It marks the south entrance to the channel through Croatan Sound, to the east of a marshy shoal extending from the western shore. This places it in the deepest bottom in the area.

There was a predecessor light on this site, beginning in 1857. The pictured light, of conventional screw-pile construction, was lit in 1877. When the light was decommissioned, an unsuccessful attempt was made by a private party to move it, but the house was lost in the sound.

In 2004, a replica of the light was dedicated at the Roanoke Island Maritime Museum in Manteo, North Carolina.
