= Ragged Point Light =

Lighthouse in Maryland, United States

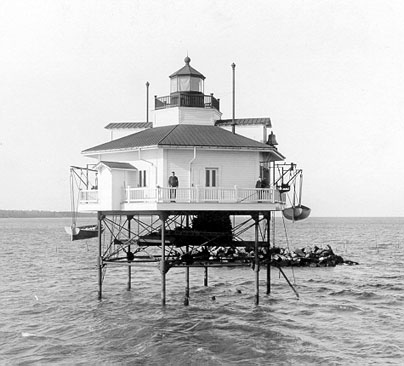
- Location: off Ragged Point in the Potomac River between Piney Point Light and St. Clements Island
- Coordinates: 38.1544°N 76.6014°W

Tower
- Constructed: 1910
- Foundation: screw-pile
- Construction: cast-iron/wood
- Shape: hexagonal house

Light
- First lit: 1910
- Deactivated: 1962
- Focal height: 13.5 m (44 ft)
- Lens: fourth-order Fresnel lens
- Characteristic: Fl W 6s

The Ragged Point Light was a screw-pile lighthouse located in the Potomac River. It was the last lighthouse built in Maryland waters and the last built at a location in the Chesapeake Bay.

== History ==
The first request for a light at Ragged Point was made in 1896; funds were not appropriated, however, until 1906, and construction did not begin until an additional $5000 was appropriated. Construction finally began in 1910, and the light was commissioned in March of that year. It was the last lighthouse erected in Maryland.

In the early 1960s the light was strafed by planes on a training mission from the Patuxent Naval Air Station. The keepers were able to wave off the pilots, who had thought the light vacant. In 1962 the house was dismantled and a tower constructed on the old foundation.
