= Maryland Point Light =

Lighthouse in Maryland, United States

- Location: off Maryland Point in the Potomac River, East of Fairview Beach, Virginia
- Coordinates: 38.3495°N 77.1975°W

Tower
- Foundation: screw-pile
- Construction: cast-iron/wood
- Automated: 1954
- Shape: hexagonal house

Light
- First lit: 1892
- Deactivated: 1963
- Focal height: 13 m (43 ft)
- Lens: fourth-order Fresnel lens
- Characteristic: FI W 6s, R sector

The Maryland Point Light was a screw-pile lighthouse located in the Potomac River.

== History ==
A light was first proposed for the shoal at Maryland Point in 1887, but an appropriation was not made until 1890. The original proposal was to construct a caisson light, but tests of the bottom convinced the engineers that a screw-pile structure could be made to work. The house was assembled at the Lazaretto Depot in the fall of 1892, and the light was first exhibited in December of that year.

The light was automated in 1954 and dismantled in 1963.
