= Stingray Point Light =

Lighthouse in Virginia, United States

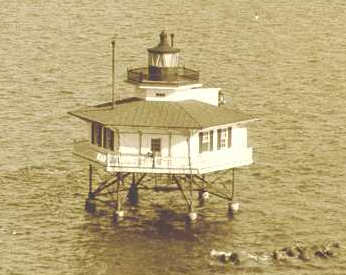
- 1928 photograph of Stingray Point Light (USCG)
- Location: Mouth of the Rappahannock River north of Deltaville, Virginia
- Coordinates: 37.5613°N 76.2700°W

Tower
- Constructed: 1858
- Foundation: screw-pile
- Construction: cast-iron/wood
- Automated: 1965
- Height: 34 feet (10 m)
- Shape: hexagonal house

Light
- First lit: 1858
- Deactivated: 1965
- Lens: sixth-order Fresnel lens
- Range: 7.0 nautical miles; 13 kilometres (8 mi)
- Characteristic: Flashing 4 sec

The Stingray Point Light was a lighthouse located at the mouth of the Rappahannock River.

== History ==
Stingray Point took its name from an incident in which John Smith was stung by a stingray while fishing nearby. The light was built in 1858 to mark the entrance to the Deltaville harbor, just west of the point. A report from 1865 indicates repairs done after the light "plundered of all movable articles", but it is not indicated whether this reflects Confederate raids (as affected other lighthouses in the area during the Civil War).

The light remained in service until 1965, when the house was removed and a skeleton tower erected on the old foundation. It had just recently been automated. This light remains in service. Sections of dismantled house were sold to one Gilbert Purcell, who owned a boatyard and intended to reconstruct the light on his property. His plans were never realized, but the Stingray Point Marina later constructed a full size replica of the light which still stands.

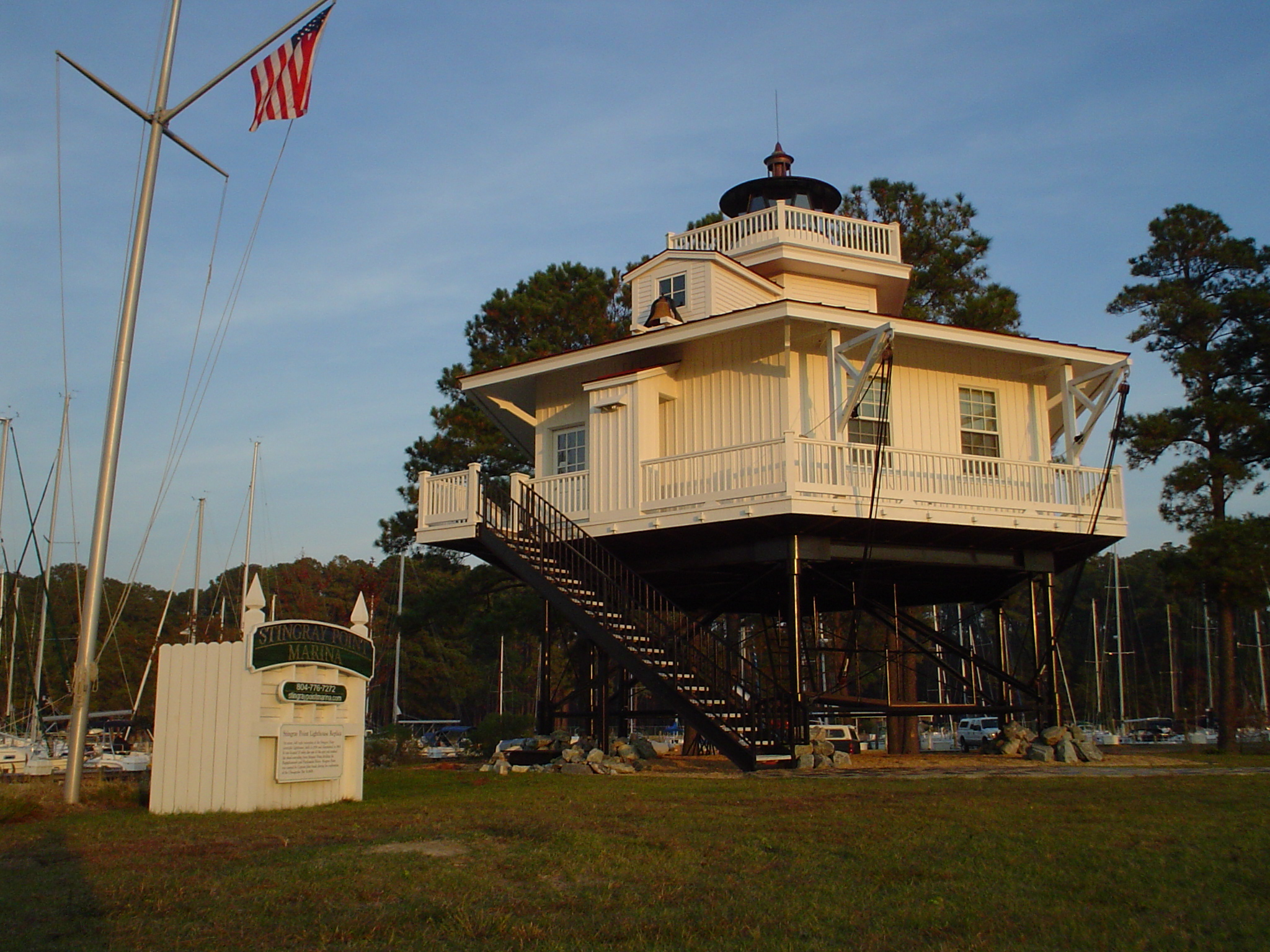
The replica Stingray Point Lighthouse, located at Stingray Harbor Marina, approximately 1.75 miles west of the original location.

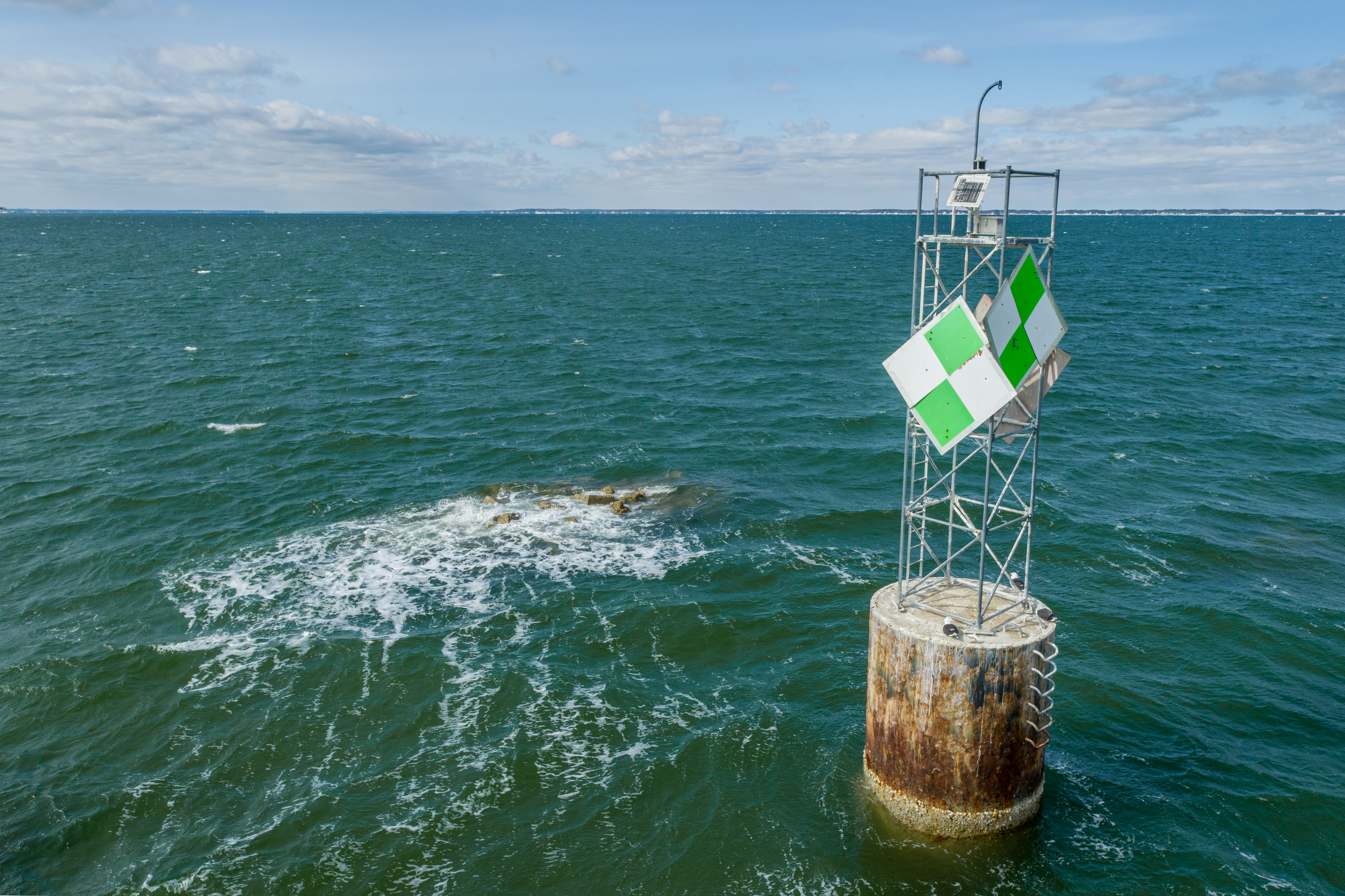
Automated Stingray Point Light in 2025
