= Bloody Point Bar Light =

Lighthouse in Maryland, United States

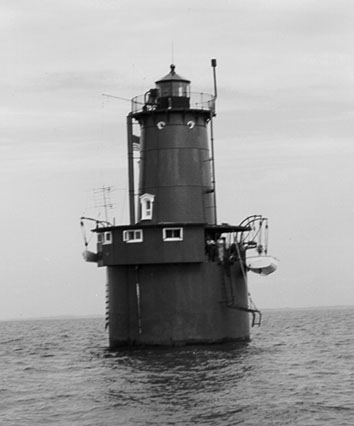
- Bloody Point Bar Light prior to 1960 fire (USCG)
- Location: West of the southern end of Kent Island, Maryland
- Coordinates: 38.833°N 76.391°W

Tower
- Foundation: caisson
- Construction: iron
- Automated: 1961
- Height: 54 ft
- Shape: "spark plug" round tower
- Fog signal: none

Light
- First lit: 1882
- Focal height: 16 m (52 ft)
- Lens: fourth order Fresnel lens (original), solar-powered acrylic (current)
- Range: white 9 miles/red 7 miles
- Characteristic: Flashing white 6 sec with two red sectors

Bloody Point Bar Light is an early sparkplug lighthouse in the Chesapeake Bay near Kent Island, Maryland.

== History ==
Although a light at this location was first requested in 1865, funds were not appropriated until 1881. Based on experience with ice damage to screw-pile structures, a caisson design was chosen similar to that at Sharps Island Light, which was under construction at the time. Ironically, the newly completed light began to list its first winter due to scouring from storms. Riprap was laid immediately to halt further damage, and in 1884-85 a program of dredging and additional stone was successful in bringing the light to with a few degrees of vertical. In the same period a room was added to the side to house a fogbell and its ringing mechanism.

In 1960, the interior of the light was destroyed by a fire that started from an electrical short in the equipment room and spread throughout the light. The two coastguardsmen stationed at the light were unsuccessful in fighting the fire and eventually had to abandon their post, narrowly escaping when their dinghy was caught at the end of its lines on the davits. A large wave lifted them free in time to avoid being caught in the explosion of the light's fuel tanks. The interior of the light, including the lens, was a total loss, and it was completely gutted and automated with a new acrylic lens the following year.

In 2006, the light, like many others on the bay, was offered at auction, and it was purchased by Michael Gabriel, a Nevada-based lawyer who announced plans to renovate the interior. Nothing was ever done though to rehabilitate or stabilize the lighthouse. In 2017, a gaping hole was discovered in the side of the lighthouse.
