= Cobb Point Bar Light =

Lighthouse in Maryland, United States

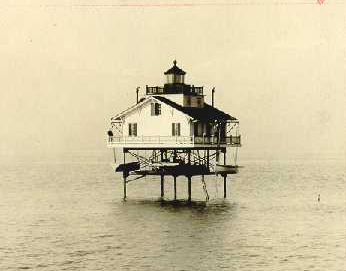
- 1912 photograph of Cobb Point Bar Light (USCG)
- Location: off Cobb Island in the Potomac River at the mouth of the Wicomico River
- Coordinates: 38.2424°N 76.8266°W

Tower
- Constructed: 1889
- Foundation: screw-pile
- Construction: cast-iron/wood
- Shape: hexagonal house

Light
- First lit: 1889
- Deactivated: 1940
- Focal height: 18.5 m (61 ft)
- Lens: fourth-order Fresnel lens
- Characteristic: Fl G 4s

The Cobb Point Bar Light (also called Cobb Island Bar Light) was a screw-pile lighthouse located in the Potomac River.

== History ==
A light at Cobb Point was first requested in 1875 to mark the entrance to the tricky channel leading into the Wicomico River (not to be confused with the river of the same name on the Eastern Shore). After two additional requests, funds were finally appropriated in 1887. Construction was delayed, however, and the light was not commissioned until Christmas 1889.

A fire in 1939 caused by light keeper Matthew Wicke, resulted in heavy damage, and in the following year the house was torn down, replaced by a beacon set on the same foundation.

In the late 1800s, they built some new lighthouses on the Potomac River. This was because more ships were using the river, and the ships were getting bigger and needed deeper water. Around that time, there were steamships, like big boats, that operated on the Chesapeake Bay and its smaller rivers. They carried people and stuff on regular routes, sort of like how airplanes do today.

In the Wicomico River, which had a narrow and tricky entrance, three steamship lines and many smaller boats regularly stopped. People started asking for a lighthouse at Cob Island Bar (also known as Cob Point Bar) in 1875. They asked again in 1885 and 1887. Finally, in 1889, Congress gave $15,000 to build the lighthouse.

They didn't start building it until November 1889. They collected the materials and built the lighthouse in a factory at Lazaretto Depot, using the same plans as another lighthouse in Virginia. They brought all the parts to the site in November, and in a little over a month, they put it together. It started working on Christmas Day in 1889 and had a special type of lens called a fourth order Fresnel lens.
