= Seven Foot Knoll Light =

Lighthouse in Maryland, United States

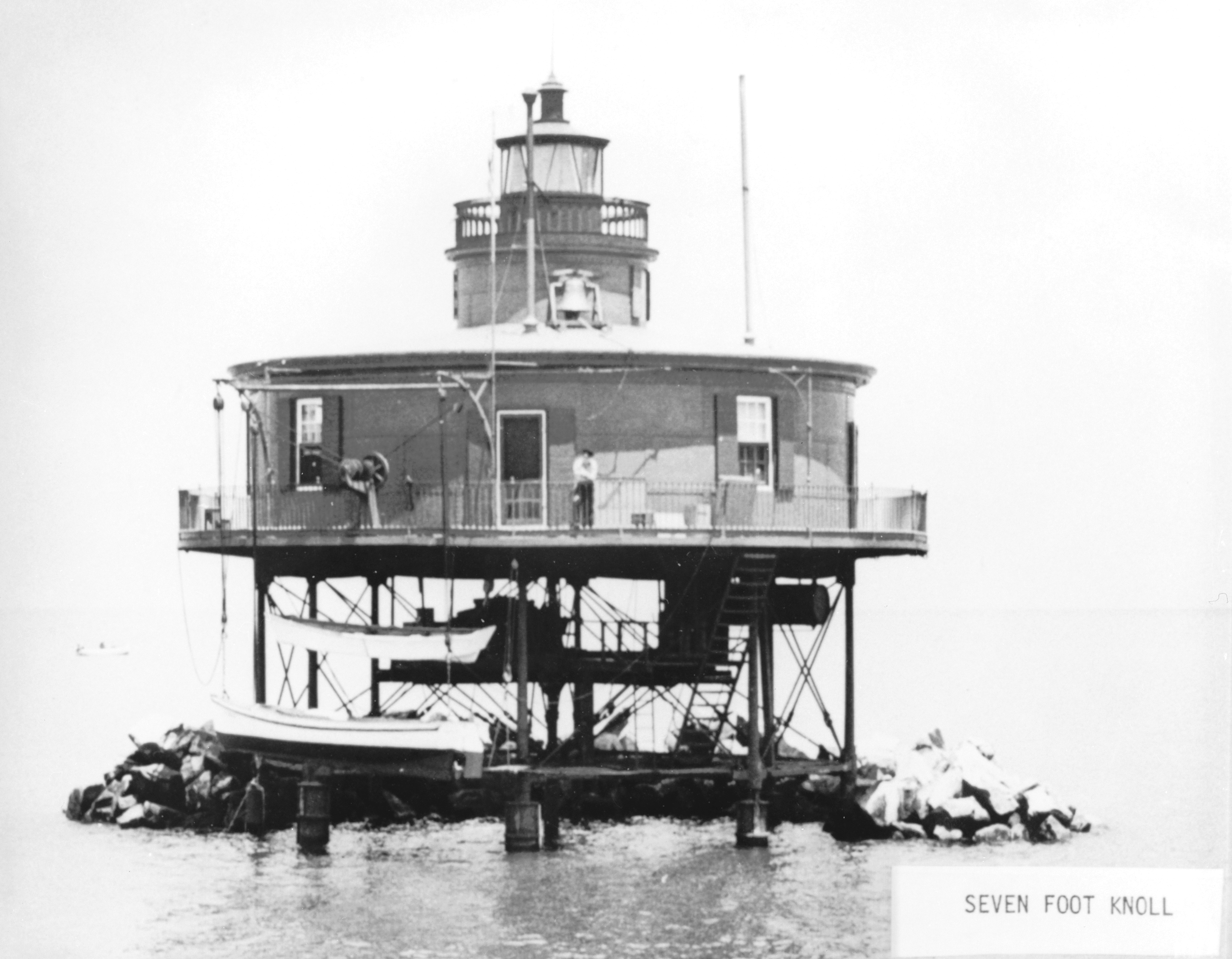
- Seven Foot Knoll Light at its original location (1900)
- Location: originally at the mouth of the Patapsco River in the Chesapeake Bay; relocated to the Inner Harbor in Baltimore, Maryland
- Coordinates: 39.2836°N 76.6054°W (current); 39.1551°N 76.4091°W (original)

Tower
- Constructed: 1855
- Foundation: screw-pile
- Construction: wrought-iron (originally cast-iron)
- Automated: 1949
- Height: 40 ft (12 m)
- Shape: cylindrical house
- Heritage: National Register of Historic Places listed place

Light
- First lit: 1856
- Deactivated: 1988
- Focal height: 17 m (56 ft)
- Lens: fourth-order Fresnel lens
- Range: 12 nmi (22 km; 14 mi)
- Characteristic: Fl WR 6s
- Seven Foot Knoll Light
- U.S. National Register of Historic Places
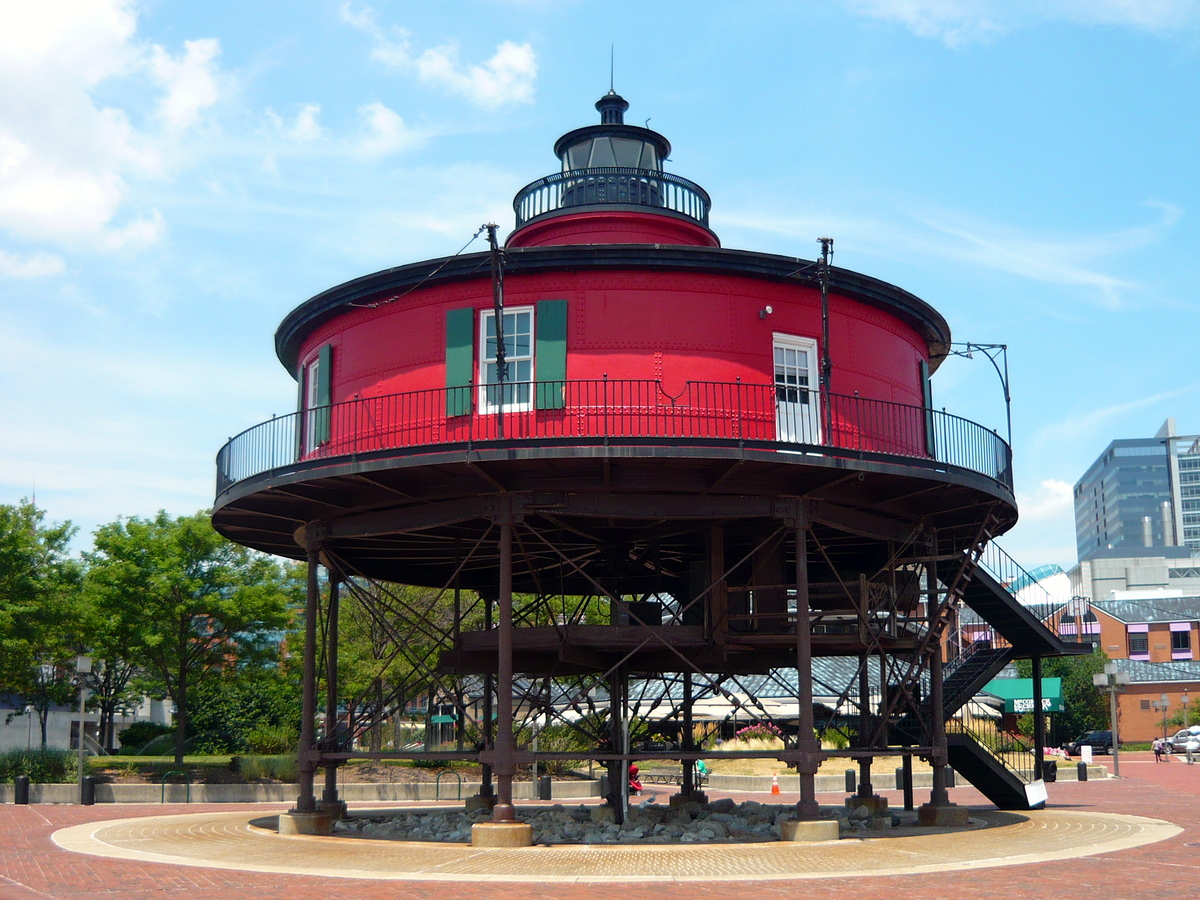
- Seven Foot Knoll Lighthouse at its present location
- Location: Pier 5, Inner Harbor, Baltimore, Maryland
- Area: less than one acre
- Built: 1875
- NRHP reference No.: 89001096
- Added to NRHP: August 22, 1989

The Seven Foot Knoll Light was built in 1855 (according to some sources, 1856) and is the oldest screw-pile lighthouse in Maryland. It was located atop Seven Foot Knoll in the Chesapeake Bay until it was replaced by a modern navigational aid and relocated to Baltimore's Inner Harbor as a museum exhibit.

== Location ==
It was initially installed on a rocky shoal called Seven Foot Knoll (at 39.1572°N 76.4034°W), in the mouth of the Patapsco River. The northern tidal reach of this river is the Baltimore Harbor, where the now-decommissioned lighthouse has been placed as a museum exhibit. In 1997 the lighthouse was transferred to the Baltimore Maritime Museum (now the Historic Ships in Baltimore museum) and is permanently installed at the south end of Pier 5.

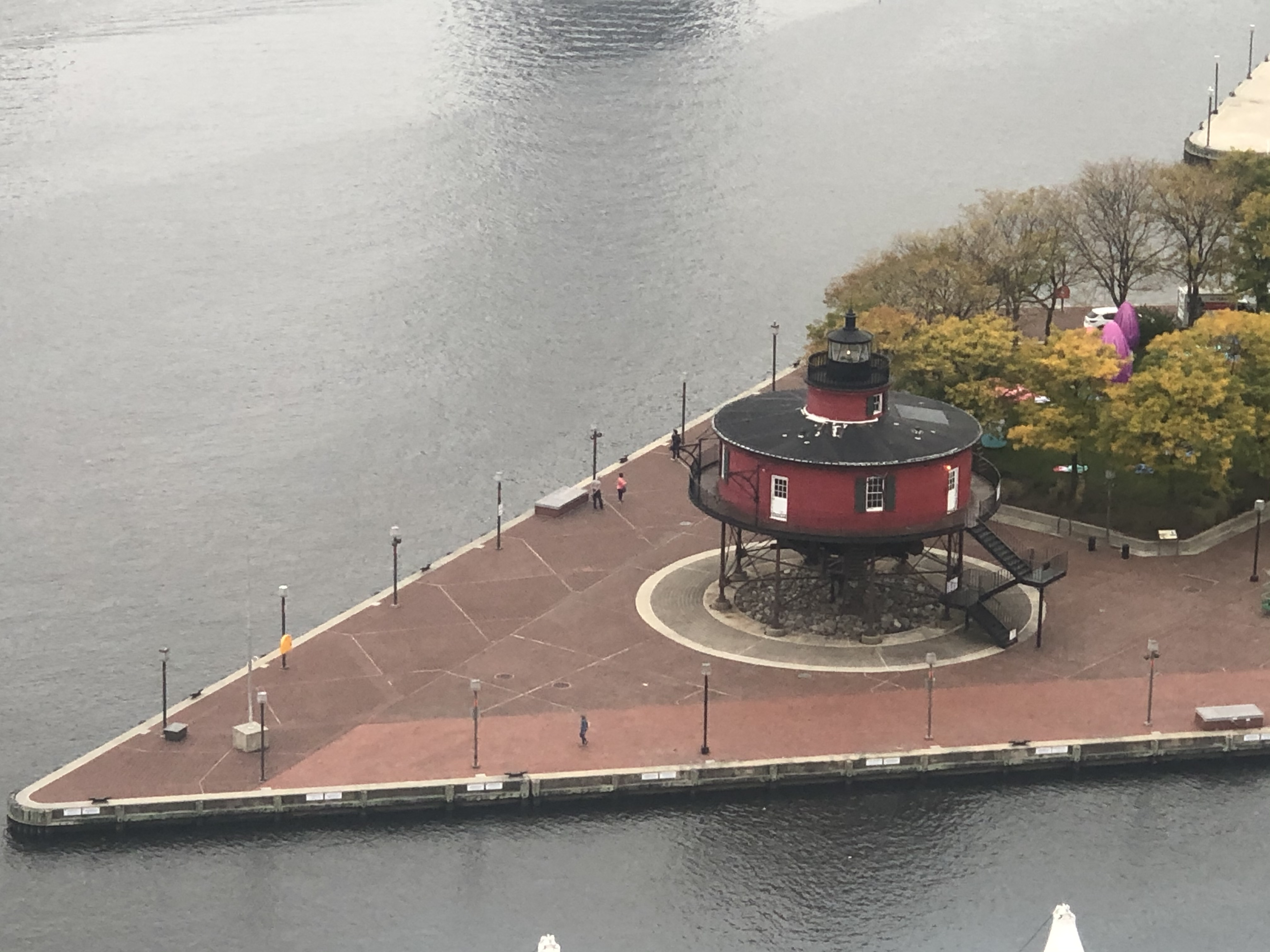
The Seven Foot Knoll Light at the south end of Pier 5

== Construction ==
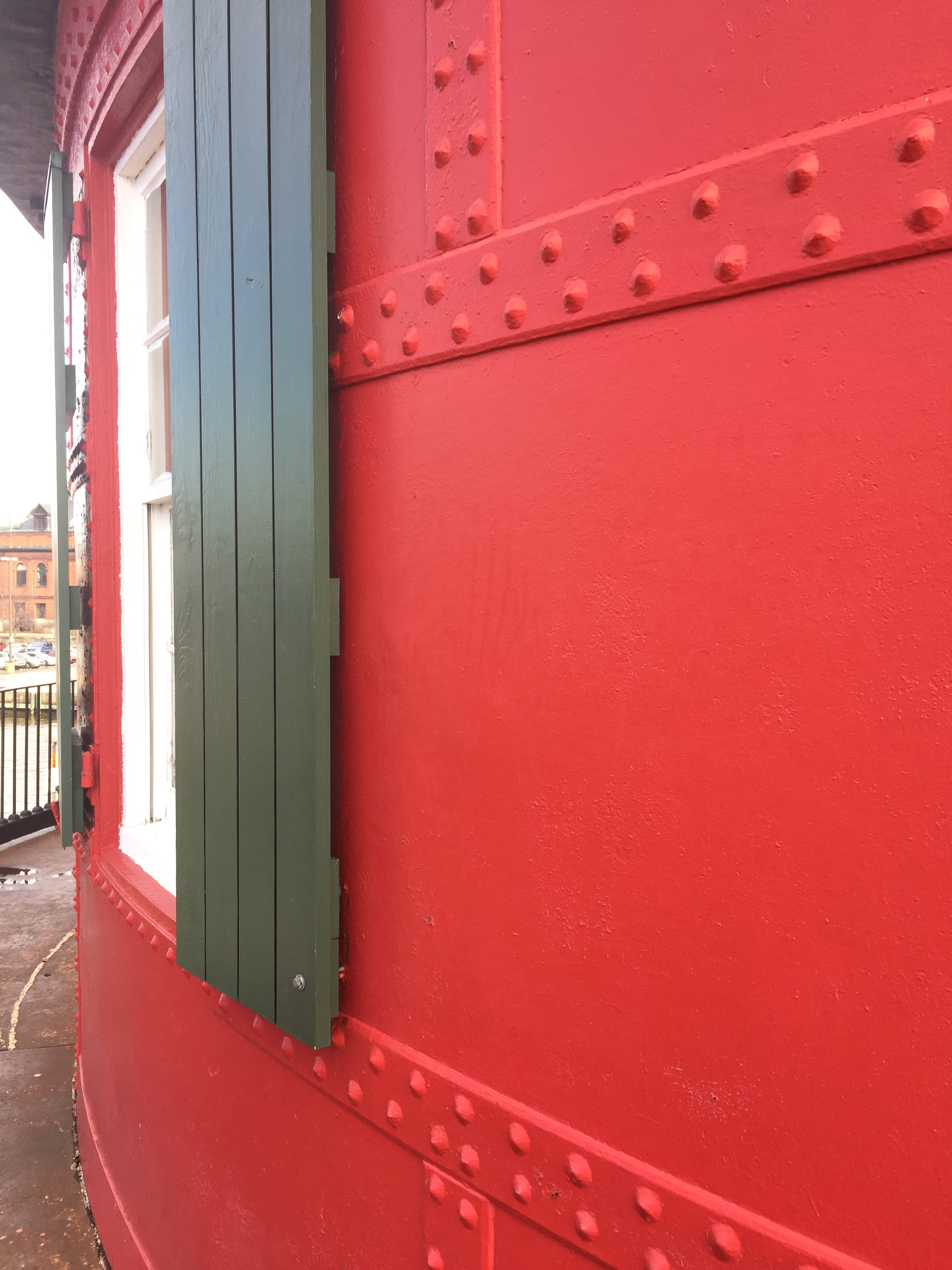
An exterior view showing the technique used to join the iron wall sections.

Constructed of 1-inch (25 mm) rolled iron, the lighthouse consists of three main sections. The gallery deck was located 9 feet (2.7 m) above the average high tide waters. The house was the second section, sitting directly atop the gallery deck. This is where the keeper and his family would live. Atop the housing area was the third section of the lighthouse, the light beacon. A 4th order Fresnel lens was housed in the small light compartment. It was visible for 12 nmi (22 km; 14 mi).

== History ==
The first requests for a light came in 1848, with initial appropriations in 1851. Delays in planning and bidding pushed the start of construction to 1854. The house consisted of a cylindrical structure of wrought iron plates, with the ninth pile in the center. Total construction costs came to $43,000 by its completion the following year. Most parts were fabricated in Baltimore at the Murray and Hazelhurst iron foundry. The parts were then shipped to Seven Foot Knoll by boat where they were assembled atop of the screw piles. Ice, the perennial threat to screw-pile structures, caused damage in 1884 and 1894, leading to the piling of 790 cubic yards (600 m^{3}) of riprap around the piles.

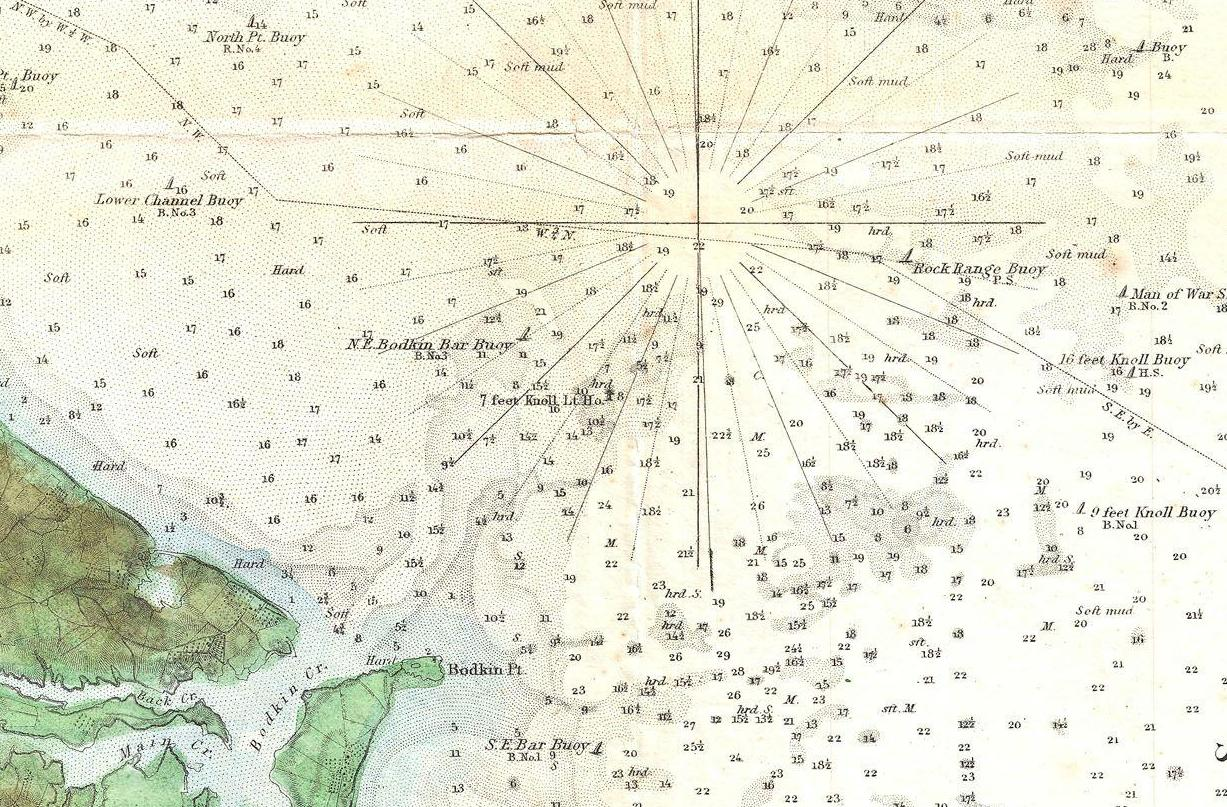
Seven Foot Knoll depicted on an 1857 survey map.

The light was automated in 1949, and fell into disrepair, eventually being supplanted by a skeleton tower. In 1988, the lighthouse was removed from Seven Foot Knoll, carried by a 1000 Ton Capacity Shearleg derrick, and placed ashore in Baltimore's Inner Harbor where it was donated to the city. On August 22, 1989 the lighthouse was listed on the National Register of Historic Places. Aided by the Lady Maryland Foundation (now the Living Classrooms Foundation), many members of the Steinhice family descendants worked to restore the structure prior to its re-opening.

The lighthouse is a contributing element in the Baltimore National Heritage Area and part of the Historic American Engineering Record.

== Rescues ==
Thomas Jefferson Steinhise (Keeper 1930–1941) assisted in the rescue of a tugboat crew in 1933. The tugboat Point Breeze was then owned by the Curtis Towing Company of Baltimore. She was towing a barge of dredge spoils from Baltimore to Gibson Island on August 20, 1933. The 90 mph (140 km/h) winds and 15 ft (4.6 m) seas had overcome the tug and the crew abandoned ship. Steinhice took the lighthouse's small motorboat and made his way out in the direction of the tug's distress whistle where he pulled six crew members from the water. Five crew members survived but the engineer perished. Steinhise was awarded the Silver Lifesaving Medal for his actions in saving the lives of the stranded crew. He is buried in Holy Cross Cemetery, Glen Burnie, MD. and his memorial includes a U.S. Lighthouse Service grave-marker.

== List of keepers ==
A list of Head civilian keepers.

Name	Year	Service Notes
Samuel Ayer	1855–1856	
George McCutchen	1856–1860	
George Seiber	1860–1861	
E. B. Lucas	1861–1865	
Thomas Cannon	1865–1867	
John H. Wills	1867–1869	
Edward B. Lucas	1869–1870	
Thomas B. Davis	1870–1872	
William Moody	1872–1873	
Joel W. McDonald	1873–1874	
James T. Bowling	1874–1879	
John C. Moffett	1879–1881	
John Peterson	1881–1886	
Henry Corson	1886–1891	
Christopher C. Butler	1891–1892	
William K. Slacum	1892–1894	
William R. Schoenfelder	1894–1898	
John Berentsen	1898–1903	
John H. Grain	1903–1916	
John L. Ennis	1916-at least 1919	
James W. Simpson	at least 1921	
Otho Bounds	1924–1930	
Thomas J. Steinhise	1930–1941	Rescued crew of tug Point Breeze. Awarded Silver Lifesaving Medal.

== See also ==
- List of lighthouses in Maryland
- List of lighthouses in the United States
- Lists of lighthouses and lightvessels
- Kerosene Lamp
- Position fixing
- Port of Baltimore
