= Mathias Point Light =

Lighthouse in Maryland, United States

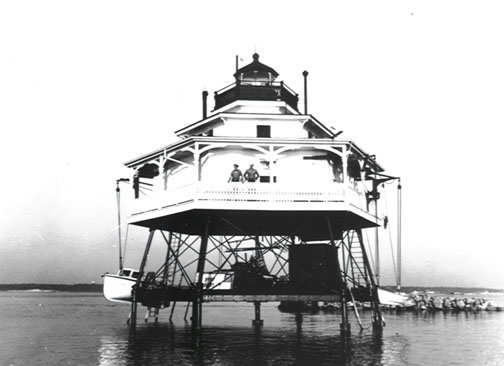
- Location: Potomac River opposite the mouth of the Port Tobacco River
- Coordinates: 38.4051°N 77.0428°W

Tower
- Foundation: screw-pile
- Construction: cast-iron/wood
- Automated: 1951
- Shape: hexagonal house

Light
- First lit: 1876
- Deactivated: 1961
- Focal height: 13.5 m (44 ft)
- Lens: fifth-order Fresnel lens
- Characteristic: Fl G 6s

The Mathias Point Light was a screw-pile lighthouse in the Potomac River in Maryland; the station was located near the Port Tobacco River. It was particularly noted for its ornate woodwork.

== History ==
Funds for a light near Quantico, Virginia were appropriated in 1872. An engineering study recommended instead that lights be built 24 miles (39 km) downstream, and an appropriation was made in 1874 to build a light on Port Tobacco Flats, with a day beacon for Mathias Point. By the time construction began the two were switched, and the light was completed in 1876. Matthias Point was like no other screw-pile structure on the bay, with much decorative woodwork and a distinctive three tiered structure that some described as resembling a wedding cake.

It was intended that this light replace that at Upper Cedar Point; in the end the number of complaints led to the latter's reactivation in 1882. Mathias Point Light itself was automated in 1951 and replaced in 1961 by a beacon mounted on the old foundation.
