= Craighill Channel Lower Range Front Light =

Lighthouse in Maryland, United States

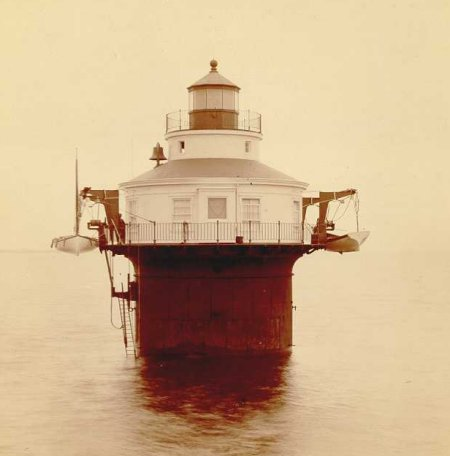
- 22 August 1885
- Location: Entrance to the Patapsco River, Chesapeake Bay, Maryland
- Coordinates: 39°11′19.01″N 76°23′39.84″W

Tower
- Foundation: Caisson with circular dwelling above.
- Automated: 1964
- Shape: Cylindrical
- Markings: Brown with white roof
- Heritage: National Register of Historic Places listed place
- Fog signal: none

Light
- First lit: 1873 (temporary lights), completed 1875
- Focal height: 25 feet (7.6 m)
- Range: Red 6 nautical miles (11 km; 6.9 mi)
- Characteristic: Flashing White, 3 sec with red sector
- Craighill Channel Lower Range Front Light Station
- U.S. National Register of Historic Places
- Nearest city: Baltimore, Maryland
- Area: less than one acre
- Built: 1873
- MPS: Light Stations of the United States MPS
- NRHP reference No.: 02001420
- Added to NRHP: December 2, 2002

The Craighill Channel Lower Range Front Light, named for William Price Craighill, was the first caisson lighthouse built in the Chesapeake Bay in Maryland, USA. First lit in 1873, the range marks the first leg of the maintained Craighill Channel from the Chesapeake Bay at the mouth of the Patapsco River into the Baltimore harbor and works in conjunction with the Craighill Channel Lower Range Rear Light. It was owned by non-profit organization Historical Place Preservation, Inc. from 2005 until the government took back the property in 2017 due to neglect. The lighthouse was put up for auction and sold to the highest bidder on September 15 2017 for $95,000.

== History ==
This light was constructed in 1873 and is considered a greater feat of engineering than its predecessor, the Duxbury Light (the first caisson lighthouse, built in 1872), as it was built in deeper water under more difficult conditions. The caisson type quickly became the preferred type of lighthouse to be built in climates where ice floe damage was a possibility. The front range light is unusual for having two lights and is the only surviving example in the Chesapeake Bay. A beacon light is fixed above the gallery deck which serves as the front light for the range and a light in the lantern serves as a general aid to navigation.

The station has never suffered ice damage despite it being located in a very exposed position; however the station was once abandoned and the light extinguished on February 11, 1936, because of dangerous ice conditions. It was not relit till February 24. In 1899 the station received "new model fifth-order lamps." A fog bell operated by gas was established at the station in 1923. The light was changed from oil to electric on November 26, 1929. The fog signal was changed to an air whistle on October 24, 1932. In 1938 the light was described as having a Reynolds flasher to produce the one-second flash with two-second eclipse. A spare fourth-order "wick lamp" was kept as a backup. Oil was stored in a 225-gallon tank kept in the cellar. The fog signal was a number 4 Typhone Horn with an eight-inch-diameter whistle, which gave a three-second blast every 27 seconds. A backup Gamewell weight-driven clock mechanism produced a double strike every 30 seconds. The weight had to be rewound every hour and a half. The fog bell was a standard 1000-pound bell.

Water was collected from the roof and stored in two steel 500-US-gallon (1,900 L; 420 imp gal) tanks. The station had a 18-foot (5.5 m) "motor boat" and a 16-foot (4.9 m) "skiff" hung from davits. There was a keeper and an assistant until the station was automated on May 5, 1964.

It was added to the National Register of Historic Places in 2002 as Craighill Channel Lower Range Front Light Station, reference number 02001420.

In November 2005, ownership of the lighthouse was transferred to the nonprofit organization Historical Place Preservation, Inc. under the National Historic Lighthouse Preservation Act of 2000 (NHLPA). HPP planned to restore the lighthouse and open it to the public.

In 2017, the lighthouse was put up for auction, with the auction scheduled to end on September 15. The land under it will remain the property of the government.

Currently, the lighthouse is in disrepair, but is a popular sailing destination for people in the Baltimore area. It is rusted and deteriorating, but still has an automated flashing beacon.

== Nomenclature ==
The official USCG name is Craighill Channel Range Front Light.
The National Register of Historic Places name is Craighill Channel Lower Range Front Light Station.
