= Upper Cedar Point Light =

Lighthouse in Maryland, United States

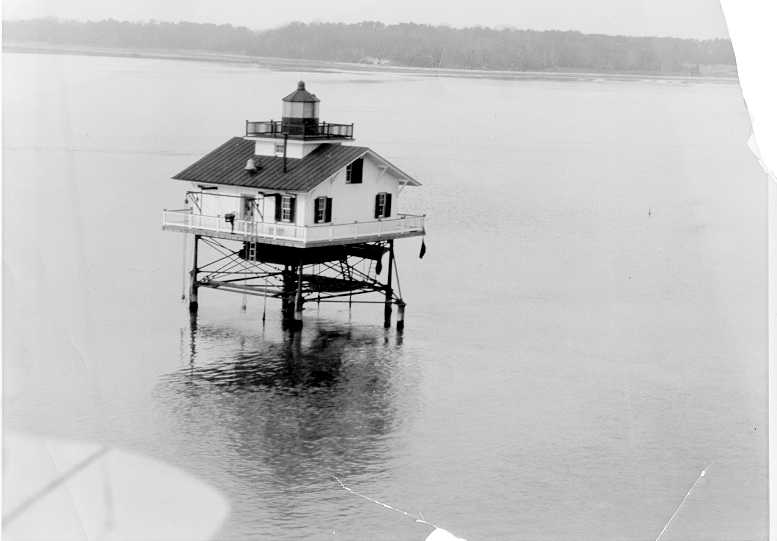
- Upper Cedar Point Light, seen from the air during the 1920s
- Location: 2 miles West of Matthias Point in the Potomac River
- Coordinates: 38.4027°N 77.0826°W

Tower
- Foundation: screw-pile
- Construction: cast-iron/wood
- Shape: square house

Light
- First lit: 1867
- Deactivated: 1963
- Focal height: 4.5 m (15 ft)
- Characteristic: Fl R 6s

The Upper Cedar Point Light was a screw-pile lighthouse in the Potomac River in Maryland. It was first lit in 1867 and served, except for a brief period of inactivity, until being dismantled in 1963.

== History ==
The station had been served by a lightvessel since 1821. In 1867 a small square screw-pile structure was constructed at the site. It served until 1876, when the Mathias Point Light was constructed to the east. The Lighthouse Board received numerous complaints, however, and reactivated the light in 1882. Five years after the lighthouse was re-lit, Thomas Edwin Speake was the keeper. It remained active until 1963, when it was dismantled and replaced with a small automatic tower mounted on the original foundation.

Upper Cedar Point Light was tended by a black keeper and assistant keeper for a time in the 1870s, one of the few American lighthouses to be so served.
