= Lower Cedar Point Light =

Lighthouse in Maryland, United States

- Location: in the center of the Potomac River 1.5 mi south of the Harry W. Nice (US 301) Bridge
- Coordinates: 38.340°N 76.993°W

Tower
- Foundation: screw-pile
- Construction: cast-iron/wood
- Shape: square house

Light
- First lit: 1867
- Deactivated: 1951
- Focal height: 11.5 m (38 ft)
- Lens: fourth-order Fresnel lens
- Characteristic: Fl G 2.5s

The Lower Cedar Point Light was a historic lighthouse in the Potomac River near its eponymous point, south of the present Governor Harry W. Nice Memorial Bridge, which carries U.S. Route 301 between Maryland and Virginia. It has been replaced by a skeleton tower.

== History ==
Lightships were stationed at this location beginning in 1825. In 1861, during the Civil War, the lightship at the station was burned by Confederate forces.

A screw-pile lighthouse was constructed on the spot in 1867. This light burned on Christmas Day in 1893 and was rebuilt in 1896. In 1951 the house was removed and a skeleton tower erected on the old foundation.
