= Screw-pile lighthouse =

Lighthouse design standing on piles

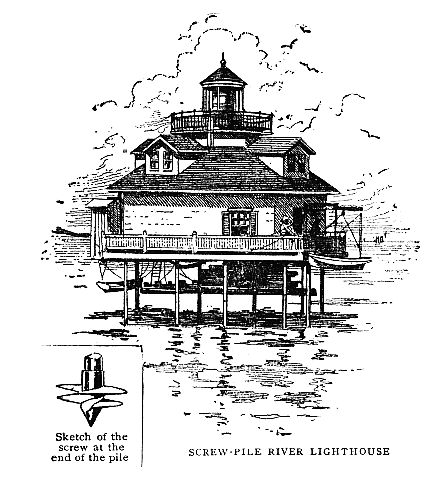
Screw-pile lighthouse from Sea Stories, publ. 1910 by Century Co. N.Y.

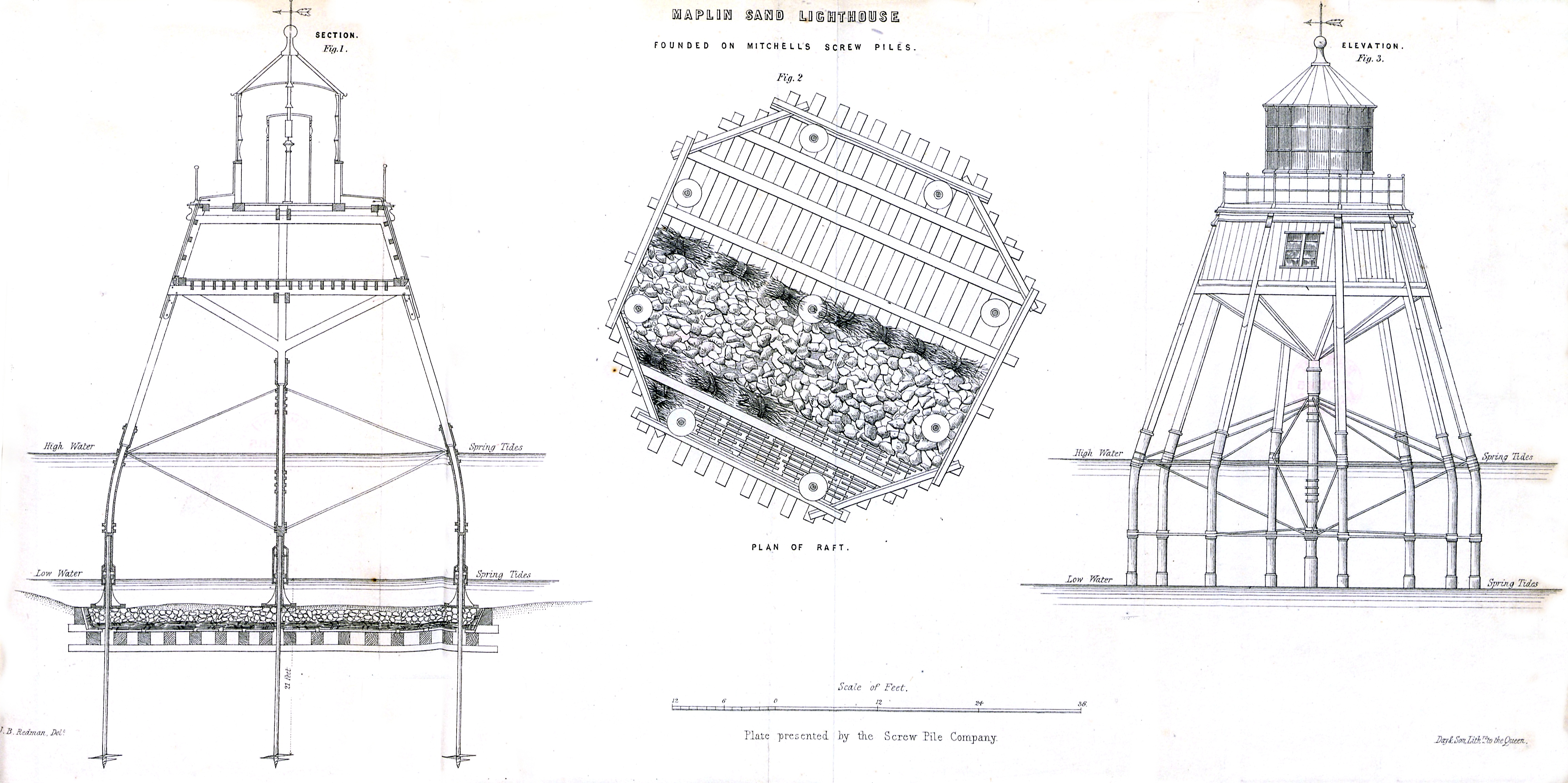
Maplin Sands screw-pile lighthouse (drawing published by Alexander Mitchell & Son in 1848)

A screw-pile lighthouse is a lighthouse which stands on piles that are screwed into sandy or muddy sea or river bottoms. The first screw-pile lighthouse to begin construction was built by the blind Irish engineer Alexander Mitchell. Construction began in 1838 at the mouth of the Thames and was known as the Maplin Sands lighthouse, and first lit in 1841. However, though its construction began later, the Wyre Light in Fleetwood, Lancashire, was the first to be lit (in 1840).

In the United States, several screw-pile lighthouses were constructed in the Chesapeake Bay due to its estuarial soft bottom. North Carolina's sounds and river entrances also once had many screw-pile lights. The characteristic design is a 1 1/2-storey hexagonal wooden building with dormers and a cupola light room.

== History ==
Non-screwpile (straightpile) tubular skeletal tower lighthouses were built, usually of cast-iron but also of wrought-iron piles, both onshore and offshore, typically on soft bottoms such as mud, sand, and swamp. Alexander Mitchell invented the screwpile, a major improvement over the standard straightpile construction type. With his son, he patented his wrought-iron screwpile design in England in 1833. The Walde Lighthouse in northern France (Pas-de-Calais), established in 1859, was based on Mitchell's design. Although discontinued in 1998 and shorn of its lantern, it is the only remaining screwpile lighthouse in France.

=== Screw-pile lighthouses in the United States ===
The first screwpile lighthouse type built in the United States was at Brandywine Shoal, Delaware Bay, an area served by a lightship since 1823 and an ordinary straightpile lighthouse which stood briefly there in 1828 but was destroyed by ice. Major Hartman Bache, a distinguished engineer of the Army Corps of Topographical Engineers, began work in 1848 and completed the task in 1850, at a construction cost of $53,317. Alexander Mitchell served as consultant. The screwpiles were turned by a 4-foot (1.2 m) capstan worked by 30 men. To protect the structure from ice floes an ice-breaker consisting of a pier of 30 iron screwpiles 23 feet 5 inches (7.14 m) in diameter was screwed down into the bottom and interconnected at their heads above the water reinforcing them together. Subsequently, though, the use of caisson lighthouses proved more durable in locations subject to ice.

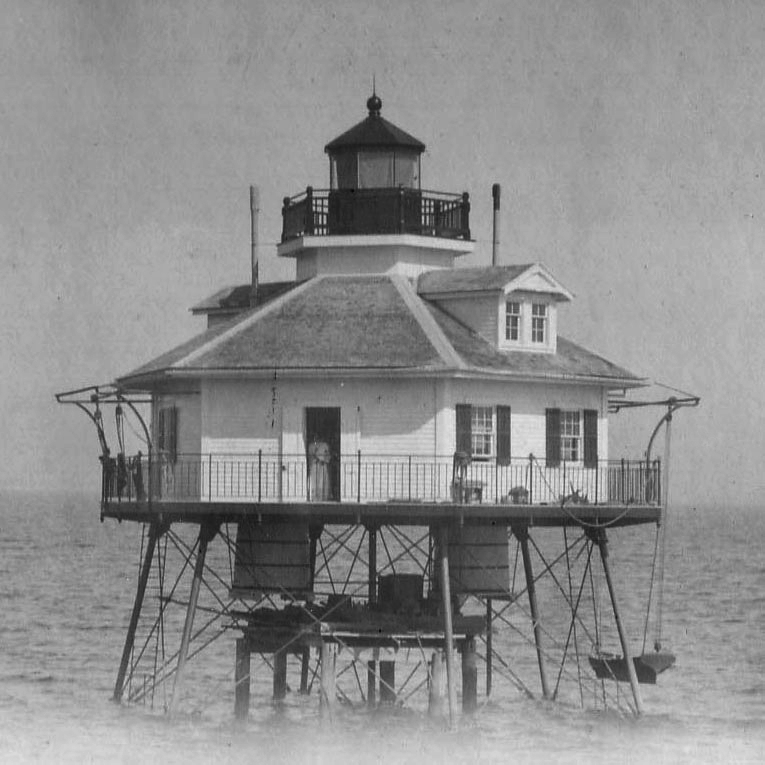
Middle Bay Lighthouse in Mobile Bay

Screwpile lighthouses were relatively inexpensive, easy to construct, and comparatively quick to build. They became especially popular after the Civil War when the Lighthouse Board adopted a policy to replace inside (bays, sounds, and rivers) light vessels with screwpile lighthouses. Most screwpile lighthouses were made with iron piles, though a few were made with wooden piles covered with metal screw sleeves (these sleeves were probably adopted because they were less expensive and easier to insert into the bottom, plus the sleeve protected the wood from marine-boring invertebrates). The typical screwpile lighthouse was hexagonal or octagonal in plan consisting of a central pile which was set first and then the six or eight perimeter piles were screwed in place around it.

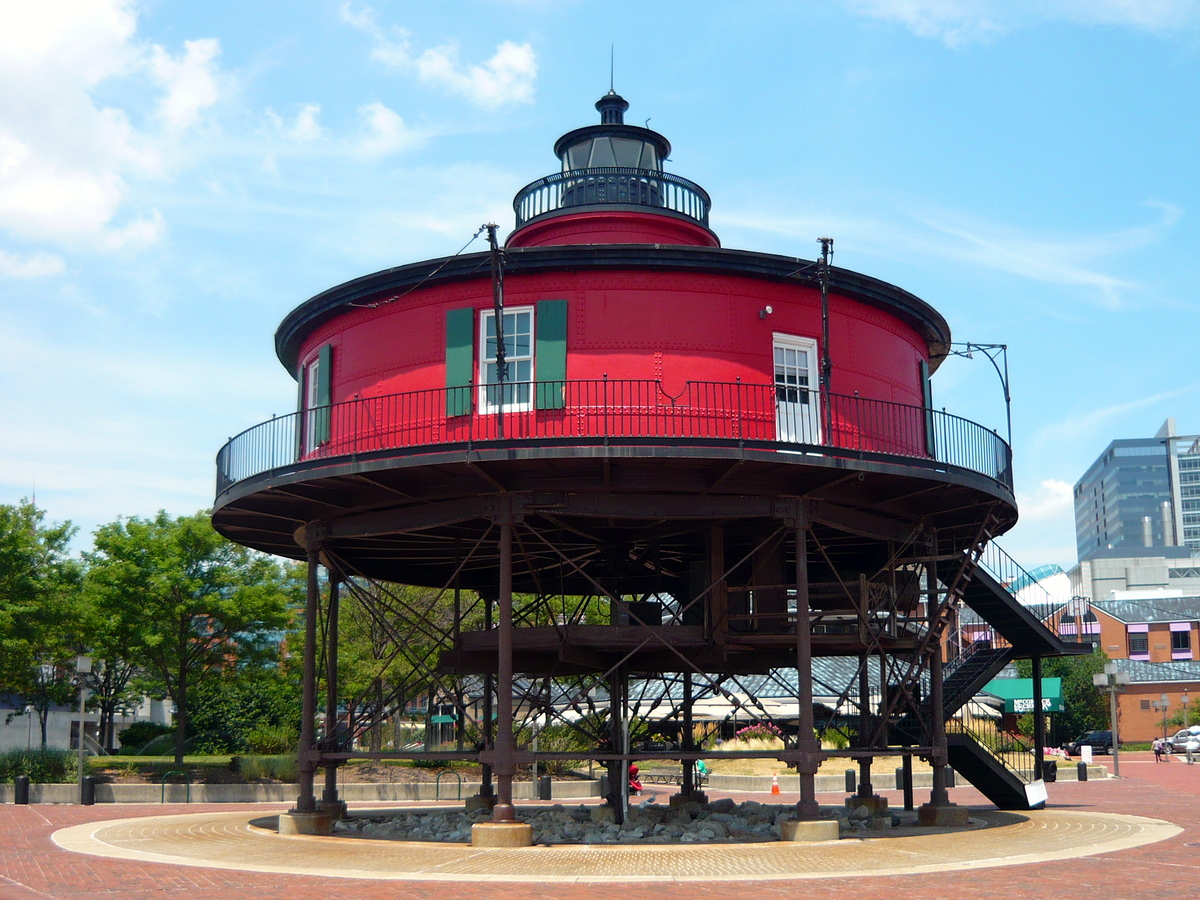
Seven Foot Knoll Lighthouse, Inner Harbor, Baltimore, Maryland

Metal screwpiles were used to form the foundation of many lighthouses built on sandy or muddy bottoms. The helicoidal or screw-like cast-iron flange at the end of the metal pile was augered into the bottom increasing the bearing capacity of the pile as well as its anchoring properties. Yet lighthouses built with these foundations were found to be vulnerable to ice floes. In areas such as the Florida Keys, where the bottom is soft coral rock, diskpile foundation lighthouses were built. Wrought iron piles were driven through a cast-iron or semi-steel disk which rested on the sea floor until a shoulder on the pile prevented further penetration. The disk distributes the weight of the tower more evenly over the bottom. In coral reef areas where sand is also prevalent, a cast-steel screw was fitted to the end of the pile to give it more anchoring ability. Cofferdams were used generally in shallow waters where it was not necessary to deeply penetrate the natural bottom. The cofferdam enabled the water inside the dam to be pumped out and the foundation built "in the dry".

Perhaps as many as 100 spider-like, cottage-type (1½-storey wooden dwelling) screwpile lighthouses were built throughout the Carolina sounds, Chesapeake Bay, Delaware Bay, along the Gulf of Mexico, at least two in Long Island Sound and one even at Maumee Bay (1855), Lake Erie, Ohio. Few survive to this day; many were replaced with caisson-type lighthouses. The tall offshore skeletal tower type was built in exposed open water at major coastal sites where visibility over ten miles was required. Six offshore skeletal towers were built in Florida; three before and three after the American Civil War, as well as one in the Gulf of Mexico off Louisiana prior to the Civil War.

== Surviving examples ==
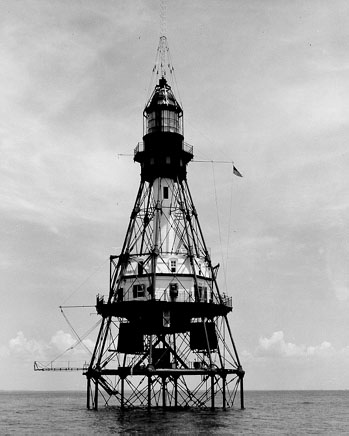
Fowey Rocks Light, near Key Biscayne, Florida

- Spit Bank Lighthouse, in Cork Harbour, Ireland was built by Alexander Mitchell between 1851 and 1853 and is still in use.
- Carysfort Reef Light, four miles east of Key Largo, Florida, was built in 1852 and was the oldest screw-pile (with disk) lighthouse still in service in the United States, until it was deactivated in 2014. Screw-pile lighthouses on the reefs in Florida are tall skeletal towers, with living and working quarters set high above the reach of storm waves.
- The Seven Foot Knoll Light was built in 1856 and is the oldest screwpile lighthouse in Maryland. It was initially installed on a shallow shoal, Seven Foot Knoll, at the mouth of the Patapsco River. The northern reach of this river is the Baltimore Inner Harbor, where the now-decommissioned lighthouse has been placed as a museum.
- The Thomas Point Shoal Light is a historic lighthouse in the Chesapeake Bay and the most recognized lighthouse in Maryland.
- The Drum Point Light originally located off Drum Point at the mouth of the Patuxent River, it is now an exhibit at the Calvert Marine Museum.
- The Hooper Strait Light originally located at the entrance to Tangier Sound, it is now an exhibit at the Chesapeake Bay Maritime Museum.
- The Roanoke River Light was built in 1886, and has been moved twice. It is the only surviving screw-pile lighthouse in North Carolina.
- Fowey Rocks Light, built in 1878, is seven miles south of Key Biscayne, Florida. As of 2021, it is the last screw-pile lighthouse still in operation on the Florida Reef.
- American Shoal Light, completed in 1880 (deactivated in 2015), is located east of the Saddlebunch Keys, in the Florida Keys.
- Built in 1885, the Middle Bay Light in Alabama's Mobile Bay is an example of a common screw-pile lighthouse.
- Gunfleet Lighthouse off Frinton-on-Sea in Essex was constructed in 1850 but abandoned in 1921.

== Replicas ==
- Full size replica of the Stingray Point Light that once stood off Stingray Point near the mouth of the Rappahannock River, located at Stingray Point Marina in Deltaville, Virginia
- A replica of the Roanoke Marshes Light overlooks Roanoke Sound in the village of Manteo, North Carolina on Roanoke Island
- A replica of the original Roanoke River Light was built in Plymouth, North Carolina.
- A faithful replica of The Choptank River Light stands on the waterfront in Cambridge, Maryland - the seat of Dorchester County on Maryland's Eastern Shore.

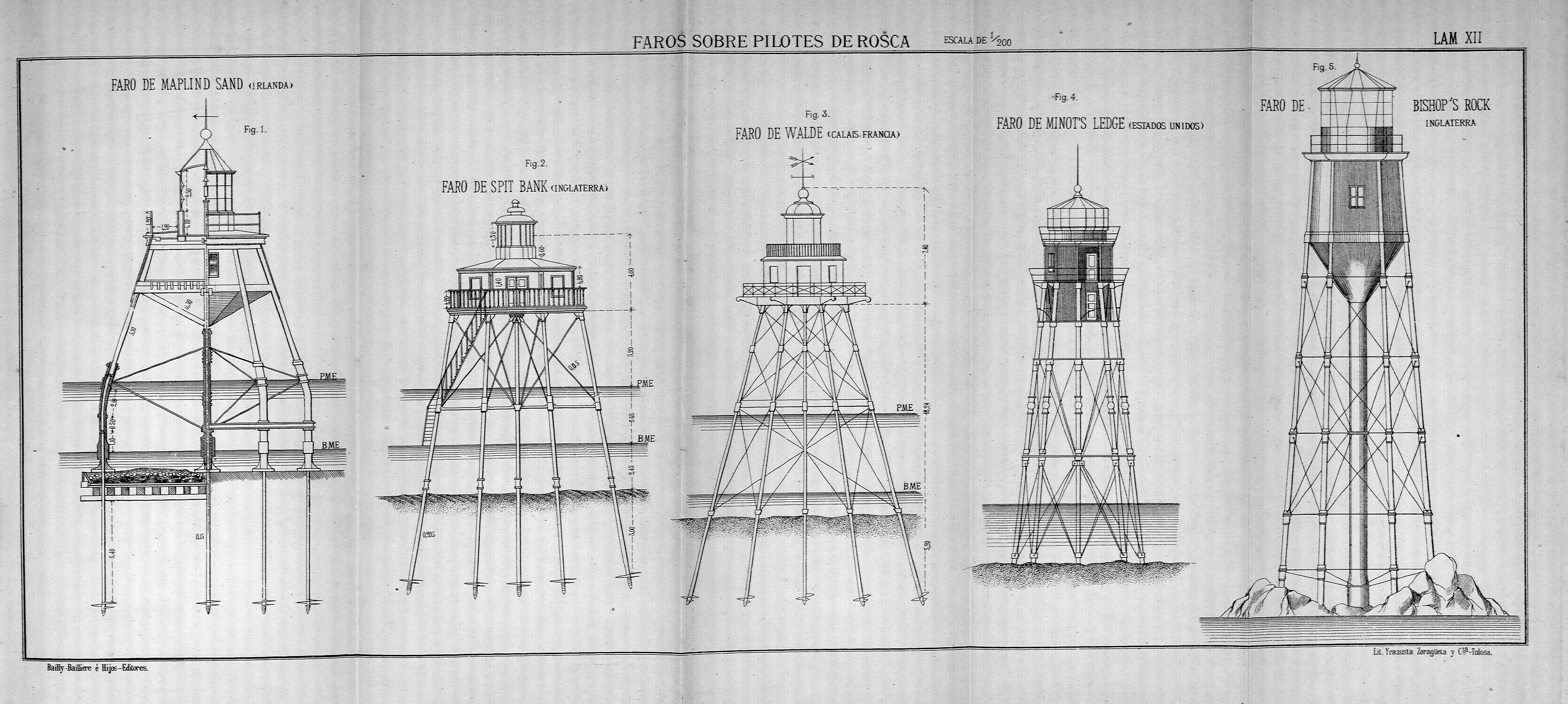
Examples of rock screw-pile lighthouses from a drawing by José Eugenio Ribera.
