= List of ship launches in 1881 =

The list of ship launches in 1881 is a chronological list of ships launched in 1881.

Date	Ship	Class / type	Builder	Location	Country	Notes
1 January	Acorn	Steamship	Messrs. Campbell & Co.	Paisley	United Kingdom	For Messrs. P. H. Dixon & Co.
1 January	St. Dunstan	Steamship	Messrs. Andrew Leslie & Co.	Hebburn-on-Tyne	United Kingdom	For Messrs. Rankin, Gilmour & Co.
3 January	Romea	Steamship	Messrs. Earle's Shipbuilding & Engineering Co.	Hull	United Kingdom	For Messrs. Thomas Wilson, Sons, & Co.
4 January	Vinh-Long	Bien-Hoa-class transport ship	Bichon frères	Lormont	France	For French Navy.
5 January	Benabourd	Steamship	Messrs. Hall, Russell & Co.	Aberdeen	United Kingdom	For Messrs J. & A. Davidson.
6 January	Barbados	Steamship	Messrs. W. Gray & Co.	West Hartlepool	United Kingdom	For Quebec Steamship Company.
6 January	Naïade	Cruiser	Arsenal de Brest	Brest	France	For French Navy.
12 January	Alligator	Steamship	Messrs. Barclay, Curle & Co.	Whiteinch	United Kingdom	For Messrs. Burns.
12 January	Ethelbert	Steamship	Messrs. Workman, Clark & Co.	Belfast	United Kingdom	For Messrs. A. C. Colvill & Co.
12 January	Lylie	Steamship	Messrs. H. M'Intyre & Co	Merksworth	United Kingdom	For George Bargate & Co.
13 January	Ida	Sailing barge	Messrs. Bailey & Sons	Ipswich	United Kingdom	For Messrs. R. & W. Paul
13 January	Ingoldsby	Steamship	Palmer's Shipbuilding and Iron Co.	Jarrow	United Kingdom	For Messrs. Lee, Finch & Co.
13 January	Strathyre	Steamship	Messrs. Henry Murray & Co.	Port Glasgow	United Kingdom	For William Kemp.
13 January	Thetis	Whaler	Messrs. Alexander Stephen & Sons	Dundee	United Kingdom	For Messrs. Alexander Stephen & Sons.
15 January	Black Head	Cargo ship	Harland & Wolff	Belfast	United Kingdom	For Ulster Steamship Company Limited.
15 January	Nithsdale	Steamship	Messrs. Cunliffe & Dunlop	Port Glasgow	United Kingdom	For Messrs. Robert Mackill & Co.
15 January	Ravensdale	Steamship	Messrs. Edward Withy & Co.	Middleton	United Kingdom	For Messrs. Steele, Young ^ Co.
15 January	Saigon	Steamship	Messrs. Ramage & Ferguson	Leith	United Kingdom	For private owner.
17 January	Aristomene	Merchantman	Messrs. W. H. Potter & Son	Liverpool	United Kingdom	For Messrs. Henry Fernie & Sons.
17 January	Fylde	Tug	Messrs. John Reid & Co.	Port Glasgow	United Kingdom	For London and North Western Railway and Lancashire and Yorkshire Railway.
17 January	Germaine	Steamship	Messrs. Forrestt & Son	Limehouse	United Kingdom	For MM. Bouhan Fils et Tissiere.
17 January	Irby	Clipper	Messrs. R. J. Evans & Co	Liverpool	United Kingdom	For White Star Line.
17 January	Khokand	Merchantman	Messrs. Russell & Co.	Greenock	United Kingdom	For Messrs. W. & J. Crawford.
21 January	Cushie-Doo	Steam yacht	Messrs. David & William Henderson & Co.	Partick	United Kingdom	For W. H. Osmond.
22 January	British King	Passenger ship	Harland & Wolff	Belfast	United Kingdom	For British Shipowners Ltd.
27 January	Penang	Steamship	Messrs. Ramage & Ferguson	Leith	United Kingdom	For Messrs. John Warrack & Co.
27 January	Puno	Steamship	Messrs. R. Napier & Sons	Govan	United Kingdom	For Pacific Steam Navigation Company.
28 January	Glenarm	Steamship	Messrs. H. M'Intyre & Co.	Paisley	United Kingdom	For Eglinton Chemical Company (Limited).
29 January	Barden Tower	Steamship	Messrs. Wigham, Richardson & Co.	Low Walker	United Kingdom	For Messrs. Stumore, Weston & Co.
29 January	Ely	Dredger	Messrs. W. Simons & Co	Renfrew	United Kingdom	For Taff Vale Railway.
29 January	Mauritius	Paddle Tug	Messrs. Laird Bros.	Birkenhead	United Kingdom	For Crown Agents for the Colonies.
29 January	Yangwei	Tsukushi-class cruiser	Charles Mitchell & Co.	Newcastle upon Tyne	United Kingdom	For Imperial Chinese Navy.
31 January	Jane Kelsall	Steamship	Messrs. John Readhead & Sons	South Shields	United Kingdom	For Messrs. W. D. C. Balls and partners.
31 January	Maria Hartmann	Steamship	Messrs. Schlesinger, Davis & Co.	Wallsend	United Kingdom	For Messrs. Ward & Holzapfel.
31 January	Tynron	Brigantine	Messrs. Harvey and Company	Hayle	United Kingdom	For private owner.
January	C. B. K. F.	Ketch	C. Burt & Sons	Falmouth	United Kingdom	For Charles B. Kelway.
January	Ida	Ketch	William Bayley & Sons	Ipswich	United Kingdom	For R. & W. Paul.
January	Tertusola	Steamship	Robert Chambers Jr.	Dumbarton	United Kingdom	For private owner.
January	The Fruits of Industry	Humber Keel	William Hoggard	Barton-upon-Humber	United Kingdom	For George Sweeting.
January	Walney	Steamship	Whitehaven Shipbuilding Co.	Whitehaven	United Kingdom	For Mr. Nelson.
1 February	Catherine Auld	Brigantine	Messrs. R. D. Ross	Inverkeithing	United Kingdom	For private owner.
1 February	Lady Kate	Steamship	Messrs. W. Thomas & Co.	Millom	United Kingdom	For private owner.
2 February	Compta	Steamship	Messrs. A. & J. Inglis	Pointhouse	United Kingdom	For Messrs. Gray, Dawes & Co.
3 February	Bullfrog	Banterer-class gunvessel		Pembroke Dockyard	United Kingdom	For Royal Navy.
3 February	Ica	Paddle steamer	Messrs. Laird Bros.	Birkenhead	United Kingdom	For Amazon Steam Navigation Co.
3 February	Romeo	Steamship	Earle's Shipbuilding and Engineering Company	Hull	United Kingdom	For Wilson Line.
3 February	Écureuil	Wheeled aviso	Soc. Anonyme de Travaux Dyle et Bacalan	Bordeaux	France	For French Navy
10 February	Imperial	Steamship	Messrs. John Reid & Co.	Port Glasgow	United Kingdom	For Thomas Dewsbury.
10 February	Valdivia	Steamship	Messrs. John Reid & Co.	Port Glasgow	United Kingdom	For Thomas Dewsbury.
12 February	City of Milwaukee	Paddle steamer	Detroit Dry Dock Co.	Wyandotte, Michigan	United States	For Goodrich Transportation Company.
12 February	Glen Gelder	Steamship	Messrs. Alexander Hall & Co.	Aberdeen	United Kingdom	For Messrs. Connon & Fleming.
12 February	Inchulva	Steamship	Messrs. C. Mitchell & Co.	Newcastle upon Tyne	United Kingdom	For Messrs. Hamilton, Fraser & Co.
12 February	Strathallan	Steamship	Messrs. H. Murray & Co.	Port Glasgow	United Kingdom	For Messrs. James Hay & Sons.
14 February	Maggie	Steamship	Messrs. Edward Withy & Co.	Middleton	United Kingdom	For Messrs. Coverdale, Todd & Co.
14 February	Regent	Steamship	Messrs. Robert Thompson & Sons	Southwicki	United Kingdom	For Messrs. R. Conaway & Co.
14 February	Sarah Lizzie	Schooner	Messrs. George Lindsay & Col	Newcastle upon Tyne	United Kingdom	For John Slater.
14 February	Topic	Steamship	Messrs. MacIlwaine & Lewis	Belfast	United Kingdom	For W. A. Grainger.
15 February	Brooklyn City	Steamship	Messrs. Richardson, Duck & Co.	South Stockton	United Kingdom	For Messrs. Charles Hill & Sons.
15 February	Florence	Steamship	Messrs. Craggs & Son	Middlesbrough	United Kingdom	For Mr. Appleton and others.
15 February	James Watt	Steamship	Messrs. Robert Duncan & Co.	Port Glasgow	United Kingdom	For Messrs Leitch & Muir.
15 February	Missouri	Steamship	Messrs. Charles Connell & Son	Scotstoun	United Kingdom	For Messrs. George Warren & Co.
15 February	Ordonez	Steamship	Messrs. Campbell & Co.	Abbotsinch	United Kingdom	For Marquis de Compo.
15 February	Orontes	Merchantman	Messrs. Walter Hood & Co.	Footdee	United Kingdom	For Messrs. George Thompson & Co.
15 February	Not named	Steamship	Thomas Wills	Cardiff	United Kingdom	For E. S. Crabb.
16 February	Beryl	Steamship	W. B. Thompson	Dundee	United Kingdom	For P. M. Duncan.
16 February	Cascapedia	Steamship	Sunderland Shipbuilding Co. (Limited)	Sunderland	United Kingdom	For Messrs. Crow, Bogard & Rudolph.
16 February	Glenavon	Steamship	London and Glasgow Shipbuilding Co.	Govan	United Kingdom	For Glen Line.
16 February	Mount Lebanon	Steamship	Messrs. Alexandr Stephen & Sons	Linthouse	United Kingdom	For John Smith.
16 February	Panama	Steamship	Messrs. Osbourne, Graham & Co.	Hylton	United Kingdom	For MM A. d'Orbigny & Fanstin Fil.
17 February	Drummond Castle	Steamship	Messrs. John Elder & Co.	Govan	United Kingdom	For Castle Line.
17 February	Mytilene	Steamship	Messrs. Short Bros.	Pallion	United Kingdom	For Messrs. Lumsdon, Byers & Co.
17 February	Ocean Rover	Steamship	Messrs. D. Allan & Co.	Leith	United Kingdom	For Messrs. William Gunn & Co.
19 February	Carron Park	Steamship	Campbeltown Shipbuilding Company	Campbeltown	United Kingdom	For J. Addison, Page & Co.
19 February	Cockchafer	Banterer-class gunvessel		Pembroke Dockyard	United Kingdom	For Royal Navy.
19 February	Dredger No. 85	Dredger	Barrow Ship Building Co. Ltd.	Barrow-in-Furness	United Kingdom	For private owner.
19 February	Lady Katherine	Steamship	Messrs. S. P. Austin & Son	Sunderland	United Kingdom	For Earl of Durham.
21 February	Carron Park	Steamship	Campbeltown Shipbuilding Co.	Campbeltown	United Kingdom	For Carron Steamship Co.
26 February	Gironde	Steamship	Messrs. C. S. Swan & Hunter	Wallsend	United Kingdom	For Cardiff Steamship Co.
26 February	Serantes	Steamship	Campbell & Co	Paisley, Renfrewshire	United Kingdom	For Marquis de Campo.
28 February	Fidele Primavesi	Steamship	Palmer's Shipbuilding & Iron Company (Limited)	Jarrow	United Kingdom	For Messrs. J. & R. Bovey.
February	Cervantes	Steamship	Messrs. Campbel & Co.	Paisley	United Kingdom	For Marquis de Campo.
February	Constance	Steamship	Messrs. Campbell & Co.	Paisley	United Kingdom	For Messrs. Dansay & Robinson.
February	Dromedary	Steamship	Messrs. Barclay, Curle & Co.	Whiteinch	United Kingdom	For John Burns.
1 March	Bothwell Castle	Steamship	Messrs. Raylton Dixon & Co.	Middlesbrough	United Kingdom	For Castle Line.
1 March	Mariner	Steamship	Messrs. M. Pearse & Co.	Stockton-on-Tees	United Kingdom	For private owner.
1 March	Quetta	Steamship	William Denny & Bros.	Dumbarton	United Kingdom	For Gray, Dawes & Co.
1 March	Roseville	Steamship	Messrs. W. Gray & Co.	West Hartlepool	United Kingdom	For R. Shadforth & Co.
1 March	Servia	Ocean Liner	J. & G. Thompson	Clydebank	United Kingdom	For Cunard Line. At launch, this was second largest ship to be built; the Great Eastern (launched in 1858) the largest.
2 March	Algoa Bay	Barque	Messrs. Russell & Co.	Greenock	United Kingdom	For Messrs. Hatfield, Cameron & Co.
2 March	Brunswick	Steamship	William Pickersgill & Sons	Sunderland	United Kingdom	For John Bacon.
2 March	Embleton	Steamship	Messrs. W. Gray & Co.	West Hartlepool	United Kingdom	For Messrs. G. T. Pearson & Co.
2 March	Lockyer	Steamship	Bartram, Haswell & Co.	Sunderland	United Kingdom	For William Thompson & Co.
2 March	Plessy	Steamship	Messrs. Hodgson & Soulsby	Blyth, Northumberland	United Kingdom	For Messrs. Watts, Ward & Co.
3 March	Notting Hill	Steamship	Messrs. Dobie & Co.	Govan	United Kingdom	For Mr. Nott and others, or City Line.
3 March	Ranee	Steamship	Messrs. Ramage & Ferguson	Leith	United Kingdom	For Borneo Company Limited.
3 March	Saxon Prince	Cargo ship	Messrs. C. S. Swan & Hunter	Newcastle upon Tyne	United Kingdom	For James Knott.
5 March	Fairfield	Steamship	Palmers Shipbuilding & Iron Company (Limited)	Jarrow	United Kingdom	For Joseph Brown & Partners.
7 March	Albingia	Steamship	Messrs. Dobie & Co.	Govan	United Kingdom	For Hamburg-Amerikanische Packetfahrt-Actien-Gesellschaft.
15 March	Agnes Otto	Steamship	Messrs. John Readhead & Sons	South Shields	United Kingdom	For George Otto.
15 March	Bouncer	Bouncer-class gunboat		Pembroke Dockyard	United Kingdom	For Royal Navy.
15 March	Insolent	Bouncer-class gunboat		Pembroke Dockyard	United Kingdom	For Royal Navy.
16 March	Huntingdon	Steamship	Messrs. A. Leslie & Co.	Hebburn	United Kingdom	For Messrs. W. Milburn & Co.
17 March	Embleton	Barque	Robert Thompson & Sons	Sunderland	United Kingdom	For P. Iredale & Son.
17 March	Lorna Doone	Gunboat	Messrs. Blackwood & Gordon	Port Glasgow	United Kingdom	For Rajah of Sarawak.
17 March	Donats	Steamship	Messrs. Schlesinger, Davis & Co.	Wallsend	United Kingdom	For St. Donats Steamship Co.
17 March	Thorn Holme	Steamship	Joseph L. Thompson & Sons	Sunderland	United Kingdom	For Hine Bros.
18 March	Southbourne	Steamship	John Blumer & Co	Sunderland	United Kingdom	For D. P. Garbutt.
19 March	Abeona	Steamship	Bartram, Haswell & Co.	Sunderland	United Kingdom	For J. Graham, or Messrs. Graham, Anderson & Co.
19 March	Bretton Hall	Steamship	Messrs. Charles Connell & Co.	Scotstoun	United Kingdom	For Messrs. Alexander & Radcliffe.
19 March	Copley	Steamship	Messrs. W. H. Potter & Son	Liverpool	United Kingdom	For White Star Line.
19 March	Goval	Steamship	Messrs. Hall, Russell & Co.	Aberdeen	United Kingdom	For Messrs. William Leslie & Co.
19 March	Heron	Steamship	Messrs. Scott & Co.	Bowling	United Kingdom	For Messrs. R. Walker & Co.
19 March	Providence	Schooner	R. Cliffe	Castleford	United Kingdom	For R. Cliffe & William Heptinstall.
21 March	Refulgent	Steamship	Short Bros.	Sunderland	United Kingdom	For James Westoll.
22 March	Ban Whatt Soon	Steamship	Messrs. Blackwood & Gordon	Port Glasgow	United Kingdom	For private owner.
22 March	Iron Acton	Steamship	Messrs. Raylton Dixon & Co.	Middlesbrough	United Kingdom	For Messrs. King Bros.
22 March	Palma	Steamship	Messrs. H. M'Intyre & Co.	Merksworth	United Kingdom	For Compagnia La Islena.
27 March	Dawn	Steamship	Messrs. Edward & Symes	Cubitt Town	United Kingdom	For Tobago Steamship Co.
29 March	Poh Ann	Steamship	Messrs. Wigham, Richardson & Co	Low Walker.	United Kingdom	For Messrs. Guthrie & Co.
29 March	Terrible	Terrible-class ironclad		Brest, France	France	For French Navy.
30 March	Brenda	Steamship	Messrs. E. Withy & Co.	Hartlepool	United Kingdom	For F. Erskind.
30 March	Napier	Steamship	Tyne Iron Shipbuilding Co.	Willington-on-Tyne	United Kingdom	For James Tait.
30 March	Oaks	Steam yacht	Messrs. T. B. Seath & Co.	Rutherglen	United Kingdom	For Mr. Steel, or T. B. Seath.
30 March	Royal Norman	Tug	J. T. Eltringham	South Shields	United Kingdom	For Messrs. Sharp Bros.
31 March	Akaba	Steamship	Messrs. M. Pearse & Co.	Stockton-on-Tees	United Kingdom	For private owner.
31 March	Aristides	Steamship	Messrs. T. Royden & Sons	Liverpool	United Kingdom	For Messrs. Layborn & Legge.
31 March	Juliet	Steamship	Messrs. Raylton Dixon & Co.	Middlesbrough	United Kingdom	For Red Cross Line.
31 March	Kelat	Full-rigged ship	Richardson, Duck & Co.	Stockton-on-Tees	United Kingdom	For E. Bates & Sons.
31 March	Lido	Steamship	Messrs. Murdoch & Murray	Port Glasgow	United Kingdom	For Messrs. Raeburn & Verel.
March	Georgie	Steamship	London and Glasgow Shipbuilding Co.	Glasgow	United Kingdom	For private owner.
March	Governor	Steamship	Messrs. Aitken & Mansel	Whiteinch	United Kingdom	For private owner.
1 April	Falcon	Steam yacht	Messrs. Dobson & Charles	Grangemouth	United Kingdom	For Messrs. John Inglis & Co.
1 April	Imerina	Steamship	Campbeltown Shipbuilding Co.	Campbeltown	United Kingdom	For private owner.
2 April	Elbe	Ocean liner	Messrs. John Elder & Co.	Govan	United Kingdom	For Norddeutscher Lloyd.
2 April	Eliza	Pilot cutter	Messrs. J. & J. Cooper	Pill	United Kingdom	For J. Barry.
2 April	Gorilla	Steamship	Messrs. Barclay, Curle & Co.	Whiteinch	United Kingdom	For John Burns.
2 April	Grangefell	Steamship	Messrs. R. & J. Evans & Co.	Liverpool	United Kingdom	For Messrs. Hume, Smith & Co.
2 April	Merannio	Steamship	Messrs. William Gray & Co.	West Hartlepool	United Kingdom	For Messrs. Gledhill & Deshart.
2 April	Perseverance	Steamship	Short Bros.	Sunderland	United Kingdom	For T. Freear, or Messrs. Freear & Dix.
2 April	Strabo	Steamship	Barrow Ship Building Co. Ltd.	Barrow-in-Furness	United Kingdom	For Liverpool, Brazil & River Plate Steam Nav. Co. Ltd.
4 April	Innishowen	Paddle steamer	Messrs. Napier, Shanks & Bell	Yoker	United Kingdom	For Messrs. M'Crea & M'Farlane.
4 April	May	Cutter	Messrs. Robert Steele & Co.	Cartsdyke	United Kingdom	For private owner.
6 April	Horsa	Steamship	Messrs. Lobnitz & Co.	Renfrew	United Kingdom	For Jydse Engelske Dampskibs Selskab.
11 April	Serena	Steamship	Messrs. Robert Napier & Sons	Glasgow	United Kingdom	For Pacific Steam Navigation Company.
13 April	Catania	Steamship	Messrs. Alexander Stephen & Sons	Linthouse	United Kingdom	For Messrs. R. M. Sloman & Co.
13 April	Oyapock	Wheeled aviso	Jollet & Babin	Nantes	France	For French Navy
13 April	North Sea	Steamship	Messrs. Alexander Stephen & Sons	Dundee	United Kingdom	For Dundee, Perth & London Shipping Co.
13 April	Trevilley	Steamship	John Readhead & Sons	South Shields	United Kingdom	For Edward Hain and Son.
14 April	Amitié	Steamship	Messrs. H. M'Intyre & Co.	Merksworth	United Kingdom	For private owner.
14 April	Arica	Steamship	Messrs. Laird Bros	Birkenhead	United Kingdom	For Pacific Steam Navigation Company.
14 April	Armenia	Steamship	Messrs. David & William Henderson	Meadowside	United Kingdom	For South American Company of Steamers.
14 April	Baron Ardrossan	Steamship	Messrs. Turnbull & Son.	Whitby	United Kingdom	For Hugh Hogarth.
14 April	Mary Miller	Schooner	Mr. Rodger	Carrickfergus	United Kingdom	For Messrs. James Fisher & Sons.
14 April	Routenburn	East Indiaman	Messrs. R. Steele & Co.	Greenock	United Kingdom	For Messrs. D. & R. Shankland.
16 April	Kingsley	Steamship	Messrs. Thomas & William Smith	North Shields	United Kingdom	For Messrs. Edward Eccles & Co.
16 April	Laja	Steamship	Messrs. John Reid & Co.	Port Glasgow	United Kingdom	For Compagnia Sud Americana de Vapores.
16 April	Minniehaha	Steamship		Belfast	United Kingdom	For private owner.
16 April	Sportsman	Steamship	Messrs. Palmer's & Co.	Jarrow	United Kingdom	For William J. Jobling.
16 April	Surrey	Steamship	Messrs. W. Gray & Co.	West Hartlepool	United Kingdom	For Atlantic Transport Co. (Limited).
16 April	Winnebah	Cargo ship	Harland & Wolff	Belfast	United Kingdom	For African Steamship Co.
21 April	Marquette	Lake freighter	George Presley & Co.	Cleveland, Ohio	United States	For Gilchrist Transportation Co.
25 April	Crawshaw Bailey	Steamship	Messrs. Edward Finch & Co. (Limited)	Chepstow	United Kingdom	For E. J. Harley.
26 April	Blaenavon	Steamship	Messrs. Palmer & Co	Howdon	United Kingdom	For Morrell Bros.
26 April	Galileo	Steamship	Messrs. Earle's	Hull	United Kingdom	For Messrs. Thomas Wilson, Sons, & Co.
26 April	Oliveto	Steamship	James Laing	Sunderland	United Kingdom	For D. G. Pinkney & Sons.
27 April	Barnsley	Steamship	Robert Thompson & Sons	Sunderland	United Kingdom	For H. Briggs, Sons & Co.
27 April	Nederland	Steamship	Fijenoord	Schiedam	Netherlands	For Nederlandse Stoomboot Maatschappij.
28 April	Balaklava	Barque	Osbourne, Graham & Co	Hylton	United Kingdom	For Davison, Bisset & Co.
28 April	Carmona	Steamship	Messrs. Gourlay, Bros. & Co.	Dundee	United Kingdom	For Messrs. W. Thompson and others.
28 April	Hermann	Steamship	Sunderland Shipbuilding Co. Ltd	Sunderland	United Kingdom	For Steinmann & Ludwig.
28 April	Krete	Steamship	Messrs. H. M'Intyre & Co.	Merksworth	United Kingdom	For Cavalero D. P. Gudi.
28 April	Mary Agnew	Clipper	Messrs. Masters	Pembroke Dock	United Kingdom	For private owner.
30 April	Arabic	Cargo liner	Harland & Wolff	Belfast	United Kingdom	For White Star Line.
30 April	Aranmore	Steamship	Messrs. W. Simons & Co.	Renfrew	United Kingdom	For Clyde Shipping Co.
30 April	Carnarvonshire	Steamship	London and Glasgow Shipbuilding Company (Limited)	Govan	United Kingdom	For Messrs. Jenkin & Co.
30 April	Château Lafite	Steamship	Messrs. Oswald, Mordaunt & Co.	Southampton	United Kingdom	For Compagnie Bordelaise de Navigation à Vapeur.
30 April	Dryburgh Abbey	Steamship	Messrs. Wigham, Richardson & Co.	Low Walker	United Kingdom	For Messrs. Wood Bros. & Co.
30 April	Hebridean	Steamship	Messrs. T. B. Seath & Co.	Rutherglen	United Kingdom	For Messrs. John M'Callum & Co.
30 April	Iolanthe	Steam yacht	Messrs. Ramage & Ferguson	Leith	United Kingdom	For T. J. Waller.
30 April	Moss Rose	Tug	Messrs. Edward Finch & Co. (Limited)	Chepstow	United Kingdom	For Messrs. D. Guy & Sons.
30 April	Ross-shire	Steamship	Messrs. Edward Withy & Co.	Middleton	United Kingdom	For Messrs. Turnbull, Martin & Co.
30 April	Sleugh Hound	Yacht	Messrs. Fife	Largs	United Kingdom	For Marquess of Ailsa.
30 April	Vesta	Steamship	Messrs. Scott & Co.	Cartsdyke	United Kingdom	For Star Navigation Co.
30 April	Unnamed	Steam yacht	Thomas Norris	Belfast	United Kingdom	For H. S. Beresford Bruce.
April	Catterthun	Steamship	William Doxford & Sons	Sunderland	United Kingdom	For Eastern & Australian Steamship Co.
April	Khalif	Steamship	Messrs. C. Mitchell & Co.	Low Walker	United Kingdom	For private owner.
April	Verve	Steam yacht	Mr. Macadam	River Clyde	United Kingdom	For Robert Wyllie.
2 May	Lydian Monarch	Steamship	Messrs. M'Millan	Dumbarton	United Kingdom	For Royal Exchange Shipping Co.
2 May	Vixen	Steamship	Messrs. Cunliff & Dunlop	Port Glasgow	United Kingdom	For private owner.
3 May	Industry	Humber keel	Joseph Burton	Selby	United Kingdom	For John Thomas.
4 May	Taldora	Steamship	Campbeltown Shipbuilding Co.	Campbeltown	United Kingdom	For Messrs. M'Ilwraith, M'Eacharn & Co.
5 May	Modena	Steamship	Messrs. Robert Steele & Co.	Greenock	United Kingdom	For Leith, Hull & Hamburg Steam Packet Co.
7 May	Craigallion	Steamship	Messrs. Ramage & Gordon	Leith	United Kingdom	For Messrs. Walker, Donald & Co.
7 May	Strathdee	Steamship	Messrs. Dobson & Charles	Grangemouth	United Kingdom	For Messrs. James Hay & Son.
11 May	Unnamed	Steamship	George K. Smith	Newcastle upon Tyne	United Kingdom	For Messrs. Dobeson & Wost.
12 May	Clan Macfarlane	East Indiaman	Messrs. Russell & Co.	Glasgow	United Kingdom	For Thomas Dunlop.
12 May	Fidra	Steamship	Messrs. Alexandra Stephen & Sons	Linthouse	United Kingdom	For Francis F. Reid.
12 May	Muriel	Steamship	Messrs. Hodgson & Soulby	Blyth	United Kingdom	For Messrs. Sanders & Son.
12 May	São Felix	Paddle steamer	Messrs. Henry Murray & Co.	Port Glasgow	United Kingdom	For the Viscount Marinho.
12 May	Unnamed	Steamship	George R. Smith	Newcastle upon Tyne	United Kingdom	For Messrs. Dobeson & Sons.
13 May	John Smith	Schooner	Messrs. Barr & Shearer	Ardrossan	United Kingdom	For Charles Hendry.
14 May	Akaba	Steamship	Messrs. M. Pearse & Co.	Stockton-on-Tees	United Kingdom	For private owner.
14 May	Anjer Head	Steamship	Messrs. Raylton Dixon & Co.	Middlesbrough	United Kingdom	For private owner.
14 May	Catalonia	Steamship	J. & G. Thompson & Co.	Clydebank	United Kingdom	For Cunard Steamship Company Ltd.
14 May	Clara Parker	Sternwheeler		Astoria, Oregon	United Kingdom	For Hiram Bliss Parker.
14 May	Columba	Merchantman	Messrs. W. H. Potter & Son	Liverpool	United Kingdom	For Messrs. Sandbach, Tinne & Co.
14 May	Combermere	Merchantman	Messrs. Richardson, Duck & Co	South Stockton-on-Tees	United Kingdom	For Messrs. C. W. Kellock & Co.
14 May	Harvest	Steamship	Messrs. Irvine & Co.	West Hartlepool	United Kingdom	For Messrs. English, Smurthwaite & Co.
14 May	Kilmodan	Barque	Messrs. Russell & Co.	Glasgow	United Kingdom	For Messrs. Kerr, Newton & Co.
14 May	Leader	Schooner	Messrs. Duncan & Anderson	Kingston on Spey	United Kingdom	For Mr. Anderson and others.
14 May	Macedonia	Steamship	Messrs. William Gray & Co.	West Hartlepool	United Kingdom	For William Gray.
14 May	Rome	Steamship	Messrs. Caird & Co.	Greenock	United Kingdom	For Peninsular and Oriental Steam Navigation Company.
14 May	Talabot	Steamship	Messrs. Schlesinger, Davis & Co.	Wallsend	United Kingdom	For La Société Française des Steamers de l'Ouest.
16 May	Ethel Horatia	Steamship	Osbourne, Graham & Co.	Sunderland	United Kingdom	For J. F. Marshall.
16 May	Kent	Steamship	Messrs. S. P. Austin & Sons	Sunderland	United Kingdom	For Lambert Bros.
16 May	Lizard	Steamship	Messrs. Blackwood & Gordon	Port Glasgow	United Kingdom	For John Burns.
17 May	Acacia	Steamship	Short Bros.	Pallion	United Kingdom	For T. Stockdale, or Coatsworth, Stockdale & Co.
17 May	Corsican	Steamship	Messrs. Murdoch & Murray	Port Glasgow	United Kingdom	For Messrs. J. & J. Macfarlane.
17 May	Craigallion	Steamship	Ramage & Ferguson	Leith	United Kingdom	For private owner.
17 May	Darien	Steamship	Messrs. Palmer & Co.	Jarrow	United Kingdom	For Messrs. Nelson, Donkin & Co.
17 May	Darlington	Steamship	Messrs. C. S. Swan & Hunter	Wallsend	United Kingdom	For Messrs. W. Milburn & Co.
18 May	Mauritius Réunion	Steamship	Messrs. W. Hamilton & Co.	Port Glasgow	United Kingdom	For Compagnie Mauritius-Réunion.
18 May	Pelham	Steamship	Messrs. Hodgso & Soulby	Blyth	United Kingdom	For Grimsby & London Trading Company (Limited).
19 May	Murel	Yacht	William Sinnott	Kingstown	United Kingdom	For private owner.
19 May	Skjold	Steamship	Messrs. Lobnitz & Co.	Renfrew	United Kingdom	For L. H. Carl.
21 May	Christine	Steam yacht	Messrs. Cunliffe & Dunlop	Port Glasgow	United Kingdom	For Thomas Steven.
26 May	Allemannia	Steamship	Messrs. Dobie & Co.	Govan	United Kingdom	For Hamburg-Amerikanische Packetfahrt-Actien-Gesellschaft.
26 May	Cormorant	Steamship	Messrs. Barclay, Curle & Co.	Whiteinch	United Kingdom	For Bird Line.
26 May	Emma Edgeworth	Humber Keel	Thomas Day	Goole	United Kingdom	For William Ford.
27 May	Thomas Coats	Steamship	Strand Slipway Co.	Sunderland	United Kingdom	For Messrs. T. Beynon & Co.
28 May	Armathwaite	Steamship	Whitehaven Shipbuilding Co.	Whitehaven	United Kingdom	For private owner.
28 May	Bessie	Steam yacht	Messrs. Thomas B. Seath & Co.	Rutherglen	United Kingdom	For John Clark.
28 May	Cruiser	Tug	Messrs. Finch & Co.	Chepstow	United Kingdom	For W. P. Ching.
28 May	De Bay	Steamship	Palmer's Shipbuilding Company (Limited)	Jarrow	United Kingdom	For Messrs. Capper, Alexander & Co.
28 May	Dorset	Steamship	Joseph L. Thompson & Sons	Sunderland	United Kingdom	For Great Western Steam Shipping Co.
28 May	Elizabeth Allen	Steamship	Bartram, Haswell & Co.	Sunderland	United Kingdom	For John Allen & Co.
28 May	Ella	Steamship	Messrs. Aitken & Mansel	Whiteinch	United Kingdom	For London and South Western Railway.
28 May	Fieramosca	Steamship	Abercorn Shipbuilding Co.	Paisley	United Kingdom	For Coy. Antonia Cocurillo.
28 May	Florence	Steamship	Messrs. T. Turnbull & Son	Whitby	United Kingdom	For Messrs. George Pyman & Co.
28 May	Godolphin	Merchantman	William Pickersgill & Sons	Sunderland	United Kingdom	For Godolphin Steamship Co.
28 May	Lemuria	Steamship	Messrs. Edward Withy & Co.	Middletonb	United Kingdom	For T. G. Greenwello and partners.
28 May	Peking	Steamship	Messrs. Wigham, Richardson & Co.	Low Walker	United Kingdom	For Messrs. Siemssen.
28 May	Puerto Riqueno	Steamship	Messrs. W. & J. Evans & Co.	Liverpool	United Kingdom	For Messrs. White, Forman & Co.
28 May	Shelley	Steamship	Messrs. William Gray & Co.	West Hartlepool	United Kingdom	For Messrs. Glover Bros.
28 May	White Sea	Steamship	Messrs. Alexander Stephen & Sons	Dundee	United Kingdom	For Dundee, Perth & London Shipping Co.
30 May	Abana	Steamship	Messrs. Charles Connel & Co.	Scotstoun	United Kingdom	For James M. Wood.
30 May	Locust	Steamship	Messrs. Blackwood & Gordon	Port Glasgow	United Kingdom	For John Burns.
30 May	Moina	Cutter	Messrs. Fyfe & Son	Fairlie	United Kingdom	For Mr. Stewart.
31 May	Largo Law	Merchantman	Messrs. Napier, Shanks & Bell	Yoker	United Kingdom	For David Law.
May	Amasona	Yacht	Messrs. Fire	Fairlie	United Kingdom	For Mr Hedderwick.
May	Hannah Beckett	Steam flat	Charles Bracegirdle	Northwich	United Kingdom	For John Apsey, John Beckett, William Bennett and William Rowland.
May	Murdial	Steamship	Messrs. Hodgson & Soulby	Blyth	United Kingdom	For private owner.
May	Taiwo	Steamship			China	For Yangtze Steamer Company.
May	Ville de Rome	Steamship	Messrs. A. & J. Inglis	Pointhouse	United Kingdom	For Compagnie Générale Transatlantique.
May	Vizen	Steamship	Messrs. Cunliffe & Dunlop	Port Glasgow	United Kingdom	For Messrs. Mello & Co.
1 June	Cavour	Steamship	Messrs. Scott & Co.	Greenock	United Kingdom	For Messrs. Lamport & Holt.
2 June	Berwick Law	Barque	Robert Chambers Jr.	Dumbarton	United Kingdom	For David Law.
2 June	Ellangowan	Schooner	Messrs. R. & H. Green	Blackwall	United Kingdom	Presented to London Missionary Society.
2 June	Sproston Green	Paddle steamer	Messrs. R. & H. Green	Blackwall	United Kingdom	For Sproston Dock & Foundry Co.
4 June	Success	Ferry	Messrs. Gibson	Fleetwood	United Kingdom	For private owner.
7 June	Pallas	Steamship	Messrs. Alexander Stephen & Sons	Linthouse	United Kingdom	For Messrs. Jex & Co.
9 June	Fenella	Steamship	Barrow Ship Building Co. Ltd.	Barrow-in-Furness	United Kingdom	For Isle of Man Steam Packet Company.
9 June	Galatz	Steamship	Messrs. A. M'Millan & Sons	Dumbarton	United Kingdom	For Compagnie de Navigation Fraissinet.
11 June	Pieter de Coninck	Ocean liner	Alexander Stephen and Sons	Linthouse	United Kingdom	For Theodore C. Engels & Co.
13 June	Abeille IX	Tug	Messrs. Cunliffe & Dunlop	Port Glasgow	United Kingdom	For MM A. Wolter & Co.
13 June	M. Menatchy	Steamship	Messrs. C. Mitchell & Co.	Low Walker	United Kingdom	For Messrs. Katz Bros.
14 June	Château Leoville	Steamship	Sunderland Shipbuilding Co. Ltd.	Sunderland	United Kingdom	For Compagnie Bordelaise de Navigation à Vapeur.
14 June	City of Rome	Steamship	Barrow Shipbuilding Company	Barrow-in-Furness	United Kingdom	For Inman Line. A donkey boiler exploded on deck killing four men and injuring nine others.
14 June	Cubano	Steamship	Messrs. Robert Thompson & Sons.	Southwick	United Kingdom	For Sr. M. M. de Arrotegui.
14 June	Gelert	Steam yacht	Messrs. John Fullarton & Co.	Merksworth	United Kingdom	For Albert Wood.
14 June	Largo Bay	Steamship	Messrs. Andrew Leslie & Co.	Hebburn-on-Tyne	United Kingdom	For private owner.
14 June	Miranda	Steamship	Messrs. M. Pearse & Co	Stockton-on-Tees	United Kingdom	For private owner.
15 June	Akassa	Cargo ship	Harland & Wolff	Belfast	United Kingdom	For African Steamship Co.
15 June	Clyde	Steamship	Messrs. Denny Bros.	Dumbarton	United Kingdom	For Peninsular and Oriental Steam Navigation Company.
15 June	Muriel	Steamship	Tyne Iron Shipbuilding Company (Limited)	Willington Quay	United Kingdom	For William Buchan Ritchie.
15 June	Polyphemus	torpedo ship		Chatham Dockyard	United Kingdom	For Royal Navy.
16 June	Edith	Ketch	Newport Dry Dock Company	Newport	United Kingdom	For Mr. Williams.
17 June	Unnamed	Dredger	Messrs. W. Simons & Co.	Renfrew	United Kingdom	For Otago Harbour Commissioners.
18 June	Toledo	Steamship	Earle's Shipbuilding Company	Hull	United Kingdom	For Messrs. T. Wilson, Sons, & Co.
25 June	Belle of Devon	Schooner	W. H. Shilston	Coxside	United Kingdom	For W. H. Shilston.
25 June	Equity	Steamship	D. Baxter & Co., or Messrs. Pile & Co.	Sunderland	United Kingdom	For W. H. Jenkins & Co.
25 June	Queensferry	Steamship	Robert Thompson & Sons	Sunderland	United Kingdom	For Beta Steamship Co. Ltd.
26 June	Flavio Gioia	Corvette	Regio Cantiere di Castellammare di Stabia	Castellammare di Stabia	Italy	For Regia Marina.
27 June	Broomhaugh	Steamship	Messrs. C. S. Swan & Hunter	Wallsend	United Kingdom	For Messrs. Elliott, Lowrey & Dunford.
27 June	Uppingham	Steamship	Messrs. Raylton Dixon & Co.	Middlesbrough	United Kingdom	For Messrs. Gallant, Pembroke & Co.
28 June	Brocadalie	Steamship		Jarrow	United Kingdom	For Messrs. Temperley & Co.
28 June	Ross	Merchantman		Howdon	United Kingdom	For Messrs. John Cory & Son.
28 June	Rotomahana	Barque	Russell & Co.	Cartsdyke	United Kingdom	For James R. DeWolf.
28 June	Savona	Steamship	Messrs. Steele & Co.	Greenock	United Kingdom	For Leith, Hull and Hamburg Steam Packet Co.
28 June	Thistle	Steam yacht	Messrs. Blackwood & Gordon	Port Glasgow	United Kingdom	For Duke of Hamilton.
28 June	Tower Hill	Steamship	Messrs. Dobie & Co.	Govan	United Kingdom	For W. H. Nott & W. Beckett Hill.
29 June	Austerlitz	Steamship	Messrs. Hall, Russell & Co.	Aberdeen	United Kingdom	For Messrs. Allan C. Gow & Co.
29 June	Boyne	Steamship	Messrs. William Gray & Co.	West Hartlepool	United Kingdom	For Mercantile Steam Shipping Co.
29 June	Galatia	Steamship	Messrs. David & William Henderson	Meadowside	United Kingdom	For Barrow Steamship Co.
29 June	Liimfjorden	Steamship	Messrs. Lobnitz & Co.	Renfrew	United Kingdom	For United Steamship Co.
June	Abbotsford	Steamship	Messrs. Murdoch & Murray	Port Glasgow	United Kingdom	For private owner.
June	Euralie	Schooner	Messrs. Fyfe & Son	Fairlie	United Kingdom	For George Elder.
June	Glenmavis	Steamship	Messrs. Palmer's Shipbuilding and Iron Company (Limited)	Jarrow	United Kingdom	For Messrs. Lindsay, Gracie & Co.
June	Mireille	Steam yacht	Messrs. Cunliffe & Dunlop	Port Glasgow	United Kingdom	For private owner.
June	Perseverance	Steamship	Messrs. W. Simons & Co.	Renfrew	United Kingdom	For Crown Agent for the Colonies.
June	Poseidon	East Indiaman	Messrs. R. Duncan & Co.	Port Glasgow	United Kingdom	For Colin S. Caird.
June	Reginald	Coaster	Brundrit & Co.	Runcorn	United Kingdom	For Brundrit & Co.
1 July	Rosa Bella	Steam yacht	Messrs. D. Allan	Granton-on-Spey	United Kingdom	For Messrs. William Gunn & Co.
9 July	Linnet	Steam yacht	Messrs. Alexander Hall & Co.	Aberdeen	United Kingdom	For G. M'Kay.
11 July	Aldona Castle	Ketch	Messrs. Mathew & Carnegie	Peterhead	United Kingdom	For John Hewison.
11 July	Concordia	Steamship	Messrs. Barclay, Curle & Co.	Whiteinch	United Kingdom	For Messrs. Donaldson Bros.
11 July	Manna	Steamship	Messrs. William Gray & Co.	West Hartlepool	United Kingdom	For Henry Martini.
12 July	Andora	Merchantman	Messrs. Richardson, Duck & Co.	South Stockton	United Kingdom	For Messrs. E. F. & W. Roberts.
12 July	Hespor	Steamship	Messrs. Edward Withy & Co.	Hartlepool	United Kingdom	For private owner.
12 July	Princess	Fishing boat	S. F. Dowsing	Lowestoft	United Kingdom	For private owner.
12 July	Spartan	Steamship	Messrs. James & George Thompson	Clydebank	United Kingdom	For Union Steamship Company.
12 July	Ville de Naples	Steamship	Messrs. A. & J. Inglis	Pointhouse	United Kingdom	For Compagnie Générale Transatlantique.
13 July	Lesseps	Steamship	Messrs. Raylton, Dixon & Co.	Middlesbrough	United Kingdom	For Herr. Jacob Christensen.
13 July	Llangollen	Steamship	Messrs. Schlesinger, Davis & Co.	Wallsend	United Kingdom	For Charles E. Stallybrass.
13 July	Thalatta	Merchantman	Messrs. W. H. Potter & Son	Liverpool	United Kingdom	For Messrs. M'Diarmid & Greenshields.
13 July	Welcome Home	Schooner	Ænas M'Kenzie	Stornoway	United Kingdom	For John M'Williams.
14 July	Claymore	Steamship	Messrs. J. & G. Thompson	Clydebank	United Kingdom	For David M'Brayne.
14 July	Tempo	Steamship	Messrs. T. & W. Smith	North Shields	United Kingdom	For Messrs. Fenwick & Reay.
15 July	Alaska	Passenger ship	John Elder & Co.	Govan	United Kingdom	For Guion Line.
16 July	Ashdene	Steamship	Osbourne, Graham & Co.	Sunderland	United Kingdom	For Bulman & Dixon.
16 July	Palm Branch	Steamship	Bartram, Haswell & Co.	Sunderland	United Kingdom	For Nautilus Steam Shipping Co. Ltd.
16 July	Navarre	Steamship	Barrow Ship Building Co. Ltd.	Barrow in Furness	United Kingdom	For Société Générale de Transport Maritimes à Vapeur.
16 July	Portugal	Steamship	Messrs. Earle's Shipbuilding and Engineering Company (Limited)	Hull	United Kingdom	For Empreza Nacional.
23 July	Ethelwolff	Steamship	Messrs. Workman, Clarki & Co.	Belfast	United Kingdom	For Messrs. Colville, Louden & Co.
23 July	Thetford	Steamship	Robert Thompson & Sons	Southwick	United Kingdom	For Standard Steamship Co. Ltd.
26 July	Diamond	Steamship	W. B. Thompson	Dundee	United Kingdom	For P. M. Duncan.
26 July	Iniziativa	Steamship	Messrs. Alexander Stephen & Son	Linthouse	United Kingdom	For Sr. Carlo Raggio.
26 July	Lorna	Yacht	Messrs. Camper & Nicholson	Gosport	United Kingdom	For S. H. Morley.
27 July	Bertie	Steamship	Messrs. M. Pearse & Co.	Stockton-on-Tees	United Kingdom	For private owner.
27 July	Blencowe	Steamship	Messrs. G. T. Eltringham	South Shields	United Kingdom	For Messrs. Fisher, Renwick & Co.
27 July	Gravina	Velasco-class cruiser	Thames Ironworks & Shipbuilding & Engineering Co. Ltd.	Leamouth	United Kingdom	For Spanish Navy.
27 July	Inchrona	Steamship	Messrs. C. Mitchell & Co.	Low Walker	United Kingdom	For Messrs. Hamilton, Fraser & Co.
27 July	Sharon	Steamship	Messrs. Turnbull & Son	Whitby	United Kingdom	For Messrs. Robinson & Rowland.
27 July	Saint George	Steamship	London and Glasgow Engineering and Iron Shipbuilding Company (Limited)	Glasgow	United Kingdom	For Messrs. Murray Bros. & Co.
28 July	Blagdon	Steamship	Messrs. Hodgson & Soulsby	Southampton	United Kingdom	For Messrs. Robert Bell & Co.
28 July	Talley Abbey	Steamship	Messrs. Irvine & Co.	West Hartlepool	United Kingdom	For Pyman, Watson & Co.
28 July	Waverley	Steamship	Messrs. Gourlay Bros. & Co.	Dundee	United Kingdom	For Messrs. Williamson, Milligan & Co.
30 July	Handel	Steamship	Messrs. A. Leslie & Co.	Hebburn	United Kingdom	For private owner.
30 July	Lancaster	Steamship	Palmer's Shipbuilding & Iron Company (Limited)	Jarrow	United Kingdom	For Lancaster Steamship Company (Limited).
30 July	Operculum	Steamship	Messrs. T. B. Seath & Co.	Glasgow	United Kingdom	For Messrs. Luke Thomas & Co.
30 July	Pawnee	Steamship	Messrs. T. Royden & Sons	Liverpool	United Kingdom	For Mediterranean & New York Shipping Co.
30 July	Regina	Steamship	Short Bros.	Sunderland	United Kingdom	For Taylor & Sanderson.
30 July	St. David	Steamship	Messrs. Walker & Co.	Deptford Green	United Kingdom	For Count Raffo.
July	Alpin	Steamship	Messrs. H. M'Intyre & Co.	Merksworth	United Kingdom	For Atlas Steamship Co.
July	Caravellas	Paddle steamer	Messrs. Scott & Co.	Greenock	United Kingdom	For Messrs. Knowles & Foster.
July	Christianssund	Steamship	Messrs. Lobnitz	Renfrew	United Kingdom	For private owner.
July	Dalriada	Steamship	Messrs. John Fullarton & Co.	Paisley	United Kingdom	For Hugh H. Smiley.
July	Drumburton	Merchantman	Messrs. Russell & Co.	Port Glasgow	United Kingdom	For Messrs. Gillison & Chadwick.
July	Lümfjorden	Steamship	Messrs. Lobnitz & Co.	Renfrew	United Kingdom	For "Union Steamship Company".
July	Marco Aurelio	Paddle steamer	Messrs. Scott & Co.	Greenock	United Kingdom	For Messrs. William Guild & Co.
July	Passe Partout	Steam launch	Messrs. Lobnitz & Co	Renfrew	United Kingdom	For Arthur de Rothschild.
3 August	Diogenes	Steamship		Kiel	Germany	For unknown owner, rumoured to be a Peruvian warship.
3 August	Socrates	Steamship		Kiel	Germany	For unknown owner, rumoured to be a Peruvian warship.
6 August	Christiansund	Steamship	Messrs. Lobnitz & Co.	Renfrew	United Kingdom	For private owner.
6 August	Joh Burbery	Steamship	Campbeltown Shipbuilding Company	Campbeltown	United Kingdom	For Mr. Harley.
8 August	Edda	Steamship	S. P. Austin & Son	Sunderland	United Kingdom	For J. T. Salveson & Co.
8 August	Mid-Lothian	Paddle steamer	Messrs. Ramage & Ferguson	Leith	United Kingdom	For North British Railway.
9 August	Cachapoal	Steamship	Messrs. Laird Bros.	Birkenhead	United Kingdom	For Compania Sud Americana de Vapores. Collided with the barque Gladstone on being launched, sinking the barque.
9 August	Viera Y Clarijo	Steamship	Messrs. D. Allen & Co.	Granton	United Kingdom	For Socieda de Pesquerias.
10 August	Carlton Tower	Steamship	Messrs. Wigham, Richardson & Co.	Newcastle upon Tyne	United Kingdom	For Tower Line.
10 August	Coptic	Cargo liner	Harland & Wolff	Belfast	United Kingdom	For White Star Line.
10 August	Regent	Steamship	Messrs. M. Pearse & Co.	Stockton-on-Tees	United Kingdom	For private owner.
10 August	Pluvier	Pluvier-class wheeled aviso	Arsenal de Cherbourg	Cherbourg	France	For French Navy
10 August	Scottish Wizard	Merchantman	Messrs. Alexander Hall & Co.	Aberdeen	United Kingdom	For M'Ilwraith, M'Eachra & Co.
11 August	Edam	Steamship	Messrs. Macmillan	Dumbarton	United Kingdom	For Nederlandsch-Amerikaansche Stoomvaartmaatschappij.
11 August	Gwalia	Steamship	William Pickersgill & Sons	Sunderland	United Kingdom	For Hurley, Matthews & Co.
11 August	James Postlethwaite	Schooner	William Ashburner & Son	Barrow-in-Furness	United Kingdom	For Thomas Ashburner & Co.
11 August	Kenmore	Steamship	Messrs. Richardson, Duck & Co.	Stockton-on-Tees	United Kingdom	For Messrs. W. Johnson & Co.
11 August	Lady Dalhousie	Steamship	Messrs. C. Mitchell & Co.	Newcastle upon Tyne	United Kingdom	For Messrs. Adam Hamiltonn & Co.
11 August	Navarra	Aragon-class cruiser	Reales Astilleros de Esteiro	Ferrol	Spain	For Spanish Navy.
11 August	St. Jean	Steamship	Société Nouvelle des Forges et Chantiers de la Méditerranée	Le Havre	France	For Figueroa Le Roy & Co.
12 August	City of Liverpool	Cargo liner	William Doxford & Sons	Pallion	United Kingdom	For S.S. City of Liverpool Co. Ltd.
12 August	Supply	Tanker and Fireboat	Messrs. Laird Bros	Birkenhead	United Kingdom	For Royal Navy.
13 August	Ardgour	Steamship	Messrs. Cunliffe & Dunlop	Port Glasgow	United Kingdom	For Messrs. James Gardiner & Co.
13 August	Cilurnum	Steamship	Messrs. C. S. Swan & Hunter	location	United Kingdom	For Messrs. Elliott, Lowrey & Dunford.
13 August	C. T. B.	Schooner	William Pickard	Appledore	United Kingdom	For William Pickard.
13 August	Isle of Arran	Steamship	Messrs. T. & W. Smith	North Shields	United Kingdom	For Messrs. Dixon, Robson & Co.
13 August	Orchomene	Merchantman	Messrs. W. H. Potter & Sons	Liverpool	United Kingdom	For Messrs. Henry Fernie & Sons.
13 August	Satellite	Satellite-class sloop		Sheerness Dockyard	United Kingdom	For Royal Navy.
15 August	Dartmore	Steamship	Messrs. Richardson, Duck & Co.	South Stockton	United Kingdom	For Messrs. William Johnson & Co.
15 August	Java	Barque	Messrs. Russell & Co.	Cartsdyke	United Kingdom	For Messrs. Peter Denniston & Co.
15 August	Unnamed	Steamship	Messrs. R. & J. Evans & Co.	Liverpool	United Kingdom	For Steamship Herbert Company (Limited).
18 August	La Ville de San-Nicolas	Steamship	Société Nouvelle des Forges et Chantiers de la Méditerranée	La Seyne-sur-Mer	France	For Compagnie Maritime des Chargeurs Réunis.
20 August	Marie	Carola-class corvette	Reiherstieg Schiffswerfte & Maschinenfabrik	Hamburg	Germany	For Kaiserliche Marine.
20 August	Michigan	Steamship	Detroit Dry Dock Company	Wyandotte, Michigan	United States	For Detroit Dry Dock Company.
22 August	Morro	Tender	Messrs. Scott & Co.	Cartsdyke	United Kingdom	For Pacific Steam Navigation Company.
23 August	Lamington	Steamship	Messrs. Robert Duncan & Co.	Port Glasgow	United Kingdom	For Messrs. Renton & Co.
23 August	Princess	Tug	Messrs. Day, Summers & Co	Northam	United Kingdom	For Bombay Harbour Commissioners.
24 August	Billow	Steamship	Messrs. Edward Withy & Co.	Middleton	United Kingdom	For Messrs. Middleton & Co.
24 August	Carthage	Steamship	Messrs. Caird & Co.	Greenock	United Kingdom	For Peninsular and Oriental Steam Navigation Company.
24 August	Lamington	Steamship	Robert Duncan & Co	Port Glasgow	United Kingdom	For Renton & Co.
24 August	Prins Alexander	Steamship	Messrs. John Elder & Co.	Fairfield	United Kingdom	For Stoomvaart Maatschappij Nederland.
25 August	Bengore Head	Steamship	Messrs. A. & J. Inglis	Pointhouse	United Kingdom	For Ulster Steamship Company Limited.
25 August	Lismore	Steamship	Barrow Ship Building Co. Ltd.	Barrow-in-Furness	United Kingdom	For Lismore Steamship Co. Ltd.
26 August	Ben Douran	Barque	Messrs. Henry Murray & Co.	Kingston	United Kingdom	For Ben Line.
26 August	Canada	Comus-class corvette		Portsmouth dockyard	United Kingdom	For Royal Navy.
26 August	Mindanao	Steamship	Messrs. H. M'Intyre & Co.	Merksworth	United Kingdom	For Mr. Watt.
27 August	Condor	Steamship	Messrs. Dobie & Co.	Govan	United Kingdom	For Cork Steamship Company (Limited).
27 August	Harbinger	Steamship	Sunderland Shipbuilding Co. Ltd	Sunderland	United Kingdom	For Harbinger Steamship Co. Ltd.
27 August	Hasland	Steamship	Messrs. W. Gray & Co.	West Hartlepool	United Kingdom	For Messrs. Groves & M'Lean.
27 August	Raleigh	Steamship	Messrs. Caird & Purdie	Barrow-in-Furness	United Kingdom	For Messrs. Holman & Sons.
27 August	Velasco	Velasco-class cruiser	Thames Ironworks & Shipbuilding & Engineering Co. Ltd.	Leamouth	United Kingdom	For Spanish Navy.
27 August	Unnamed	Steamship	Tyne Iron Shipbuilding Company (Limited)	Willington Quay	United Kingdom	For Messrs. Joseph Robinson & Co.
August	Bolivia	Barque	Messrs. John Reid & Co.	Port Glasgow	United Kingdom	For Messrs. Nicholson & M'Gill.
August	Cameo	Steamship	Messrs. Alexander Stephen & Sons	Linthouse	United Kingdom	For Messrs. Tellefsen, Wills & Co.
August	Castilla	Aragon-class cruiser	La Carraca shipyard	Cádiz	Spain	For Spanish Navy.
August	India	Steamship	Messrs. Wm. Denny & Bros	Dumbarton	United Kingdom	For British India Steam Navigation Company.
August	Joseph Kellogg	Sternwheeler		Portland, Oregon	United States	For Kellogg Transportation Co.
August	Liban	Coaster	W. Allsup & Sons	Preston	United Kingdom	For A. R. Dahdah.
August	No. 164	Steam yacht	Messrs. T. B. Seath & Co.	Rutherglen	United Kingdom	For Messrs. Robinow & Marjoribanks.
3 September	Abeja	Schooner	Messrs. John & William B. Harvey	Littlehampton	United Kingdom	For Messrs. Olano, Larrinaga & Co.
6 September	Brunette	Steamship	Messrs. C. S. Swan & Hunter	Wallsend	United Kingdom	For Thomas Rodenacker.
6 September	Maha Vajirunhis	Steamship	Messrs. C. Mithell & Co.	Low Walker	United Kingdom	For H. Katz.
8 September	Anerley	Steamship	John Blumer & Co.	Sunderland	United Kingdom	For Watts, Ward & Co.
8 September	Conqueror	Conqueror-class battleship		Chatham Dockyard	United Kingdom	For Royal Navy.
8 September	City of Calcutta	Passenger ship	Charles Connell & Co.	Scotstoun	United Kingdom	For City Line.
8 September	Gulf of Carpentaria	Steamship	William Gray & Co.	West Hartlepool	United Kingdom	For Greenock Steamship Company.
8 September	Heather Bell	Steam yacht	Messrs. T. B. Seath & Co.	Rutherglen	United Kingdom	For H. Robertson Washley.
8 September	Iphigénie	Cruiser			France	For French Navy.
8 September	Loch Moidart	Clipper	Messrs. Barclay, Curle & Co.	Whiteinch	United Kingdom	For General Shipping Company.
9 September	Baines Hawkins	Steamship	Messrs. Hodgson & Soulsby	Blyth	United Kingdom	For Messrs. Fisher & Renwick.
9 September	Banner	Steamship	Messrs. John Fullarton & Co.	Merksworth	United Kingdom	For James R. Currie.
9 September	Victoria	Paddle steamer	Aitken & Mansel	Whiteinch	United Kingdom	For London, Brighton and South Coast Railway and London and South Western Railway.
10 September	Closeburn	Barque	Messrs. Russell & Co.	Greenock	United Kingdom	For Messrs. Macdonald, Hood & Co.
10 September	Chrysolite	Steamship	Messrs. M. Pearse & Co.	Stockton-on-Tees	United Kingdom	For Messrs. W. Tully & Co.
10 September	Lake Huron	Steamship	London and Glasgow Engineering and Iron Shipbuilding Company	Glasgow	United Kingdom	For Beaver Line.
10 September	Mount's Bay	Steamship	Schlesinger, Davis and Co.	Wallsend	United Kingdom	For Mount's Bay Steamship Company.
10 September	Rocklands	Collier	Messrs. R. Irvine & Co.	West Hartlepool	United Kingdom	For Hardy, Wilson & Co.
10 September	Westwood	Steamship	Robert Thompson & Sons	Sunderland	United Kingdom	For Moran & Sanderson, or David Wilson.
10 September	Wyedale	Steamship	Messrs. John Readhead & Sons	South Shields	United Kingdom	For Messrs. Pantland, Hick & Co.
12 September	Westergate	Steamship	Short Bros	Pallion	United Kingdom	For Weatherley, Mead & Hussey.
18 September	La Ville de Montévidéo	Steamship	Société Nouvelle des Forges et Chantiers de la Méditerranée	La Seyne-sur-Mer	France	For Compagnie Maritime des Chargeurs Réunis.
20 September	Solway	Steamship	Messrs. Barclay, Curle & Co.	Whiteinch	United Kingdom	For Messrs. William Sloan & Co.
21 September	Marima	Steamship	Messrs. Edward Withy & Co.	Middleton	United Kingdom	For Messrs. Steel, Young & Co.
21 September	Ossian	Steamship	Messrs. H. M'Intyre & Co.	Paisley	United Kingdom	For London and Edinburgh Shipping Co.
21 September	St. Ronan	Steamship	Earle's Shipbuilding Co.	Hull	United Kingdom	For Messrs. Rankin, Gilmour & Co.
22 September	Benlarig	Steamship	Messrs. Alexander Stephen & Son	Linthouse	United Kingdom	For Messrs. William Thompson & Co.
22 September	Lamprey	Steamship	Messrs. Blackwood & Gordon	Greenock	United Kingdom	For John Burns.
22 September	Skelligs	Steamship	Messrs. Workman, Clarke & Co	Belfast	United Kingdom	For Clyde Shipping Company.
22 September	Valdivia	Barque	Messrs. John Reid & Co.	Greenock	United Kingdom	For Messrs. Nicholson & M'Gill.
23 September	Candace	Steam yacht	Messrs. Ramage & Ferguson	Leith	United Kingdom	For Mr. Lysaght.
24 September	Androsa	Merchantman	Messrs. Oswald, Mordaunt & Co.	Southampton	United Kingdom	For Messrs. E. F. & W. Roberts.
24 September	Bretwalda	Steamship		Jarrow	United Kingdom	For Messrs. Hall Bros.
24 September	Ebbw Vale	Steamship	Palmer's Shipbuilding and Iron Company (Limited)	Jarrow	United Kingdom	For Messrs. Morrell Bros. & Co.
24 September	Empire	Steamship	Messrs. R. & J. Evans & Co.	Liverpool	United Kingdom	For Messrs. William Thomas & Co.
24 September	Olive Branch	Steamship	William Doxford & Sons	Pallion	United Kingdom	For Nautilus Steam Shipping Co. Ltd, or Messrs. F. & W. Ritson.
24 September	Reginald Hansen	Steamship	Short Bros.	Sunderland	United Kingdom	For Messrs. G. E. Wood & Sons.
24 September	Zenobia	Steamship	Messrs. Thomas Turnbull & Son	Whitby	United Kingdom	For Messrs Turner, Brightman & Co.
24 September	Unnamed	Steamship	Messrs. Wigham, Richardson & Co.	Wallsend	United Kingdom	For private owner.
24 September	Unnamed	Steamship	Palmer's Shipbuilding & Iron Company (Limited)	Newcastle upon Tyne	United Kingdom	For Messrs. Morel Bros. & Co.
26 September	Ada	Steamship	Robert Thompson & Sons	Sunderland	United Kingdom	For Turner, Edwards & Co.
26 September	Antilles	Steamship	Messrs. Napier, Shanks & Bell	Yoker	United Kingdom	For Messrs. Scrutton, Sons & Co.
26 September	Dorothy Watson	Schooner	Union Co-operative Shipbuilding	Sunderland	United Kingdom	For Walter Herron.
26 September	Thames	Steamship	Messrs. J. & G. Thompson	Glasgow	United Kingdom	For Peninsular and Oriental Steam Navigation Company.
28 September	Wandrahm	Steamship	Flensburger Schiffbau-Gesellschaft	Flensburg	Germany	For Deutsche Dampfschiffahrts-Gesellschaft Hansa.
29 September	James Garfield	Thames barge	William Curtis	Ipswich	United Kingdom	For William Curtis and W. Wheeler.
30 September	Cape Clear	Steamship	Messrs. Steele & Co.	Greenock	United Kingdom	For Messrs. A. Lyle & Sons.
30 September	Rossall	Steamship	Barrow Ship Building Co. Ltd.	Barrow-in-Furness	United Kingdom	For Lancashire and Yorkshire Railway.
September	Braila	Steamship	Messrs. A. M'Millan & Sons	Dumbarton	United Kingdom	For Compagnie Fraissenet.
September	Kalmuck	Paddle steamer	Motala	Norrköping	Sweden	For private owner.
September	Saint Andrew	Steamship	London and Glasgow Engineering and Shipbuilding Company	Govan	United Kingdom	For Channel Line.
September	Wallasey	Ferry	W. Allsup & Sons	Preston	United Kingdom	For Wallasey Local Board.
1 October	Ossoro	Steamship	Messrs. Scott & Co.	Cartsdyke	United Kingdom	For Pacific Steam Navigation Company.
5 October	Hughenden	Steamship	Messrs. William Gray & Co.	West Hartlepool	United Kingdom	For T. Hudson.
6 October	Shannon	Passenger ship	Harland & Wolff	Belfast	United Kingdom	For Peninsular and Oriental Steam Navigation Co. Ltd.
6 October	Suez	Steamship	Messrs. Palmer & Co.	Jarrow	United Kingdom	For MM. d'Orbigny & Faustin Fils.
7 October	President Garfield	Merchantman	Cadben William Thomas	Porth Amlwch	United Kingdom	For private owner.
8 October	Clydesdale	Steamship	Messrs. Blackwood & Gordon	Port Glasgow	United Kingdom	For Dale Line.
8 October	Fooksang	Steamship	Messrs. Hall, Russell & Co.	Aberdeen	United Kingdom	For Messrs. Mathieson & Co.
8 October	Hong Kong	Merchantman	Messrs. Wigham, Richardson & Co.	Low Walker	United Kingdom	For William Milburn & Co.
8 October	Ixia	Steamship	Tyne Iron Shipbuilding Company (Limited)	Willington Quay	United Kingdom	For J. Robinson & Co.
8 October	Jessomene	Merchantman	Messrs. W. H. Potter & Son	Liverpool	United Kingdom	For Messrs. Henry Fernie & Sons.
8 October	Professor	Steamship	Messrs. Scott & Co.	Cartsdyke	United Kingdom	For Messrs. F. & J. Harrison.
8 October	Virginian	Steamship	Palmer's Shipbuilding and Iron Company (Limited)	Jarrow	United Kingdom	For Messrs. Frederick Leyland & Co.
10 October	Nerbudda	Merchantman	Messrs. Russell & Co.	Greenock	United Kingdom	For Messrs. Foley, Aikman & Co.
10 October	York City	Steamship	Messrs. William Gray & Co.	West Hartlepool	United Kingdom	For Messrs. Thomas Furness & Co.
10 October	Zuid Holland	Steamship	Messrs. Raylton Dixon & Co.	Middlesbrough	United Kingdom	For Koninklijke Rotterdamsche Lloyd.
11 October	Schaldis	Steamship	Messrs. C. S. Swan & Hunter	Wallsend	United Kingdom	For Société Anonyme Anversoise d'Armement et de Transports Maritimes.
12 October	Angola	Steamship	Earle's Shipbuilding and Engineering Co. (Limited)	Hull	United Kingdom	For Empresa Nacional.
12 October	John Ray	Steamship	W. B. Thompson	Dundee	United Kingdom	For Messrs. M. A. Ray & Sons.
13 October	Ardangorm	Steamship	Messrs. Ramage & Ferguson	Leith	United Kingdom	For Messrs. M'Laren, Crum & Co.
13 October	Tredegar	Steamship	Messrs. Palmer & Co.	Jarrow	United Kingdom	For Messrs. Mosel Bros. & Co.
14 October	Harlaw	Steamship	Messrs. Cunliffe & Dunlop	Port Glasgow	United Kingdom	For Aberdeen Steam Navigation Company.
15 October	Phuoc-kien	Steamship	Messrs. Scott & Co.	Greenock	United Kingdom	For private owner.
15 October	Serapis	Yawl	James Clark	Stonehaven	United Kingdom	For James Mackie.
17 October	Chi Yuen	Steamship	Messrs. Lobnitz & Co	Renfrew	United Kingdom	For China Merchants' Steam Navigation Company.
21 October	Bordeaux	Steamship	Motala Verkstad	Lindholmen	Sweden	For Rederi A/B Svenska Lloyd.
21 October	Peconic	Steamship	Messrs. Thomas Royden & Sons	Liverpool	United Kingdom	For Mediterranean & New York Steamship Company.
22 October	City of Hamburg	Steamship	James Laing	Sunderland	United Kingdom	For Palgrave, Murphy & Co.
22 October	Cordelia	Comus-class corvette		Portsmouth Dockyard	United Kingdom	For Royal Navy.
22 October	County of Pembroke	Barque	William Doxford & Sons	Sunderland	United Kingdom	For William Thomas & Co.
22 October	Hermes	East Indiaman	Messrs. Robert Duncan & Co.	Port Glasgow	United Kingdom	For R. R. Paterson.
22 October	Illawarra	Merchantman	Messrs. Dobie & Co.	Govan	United Kingdom	For Messrs. Devitt & Moore.
22 October	Tancarville	Steamship	Messrs. Campbell, MacIntosh & Bowstead	Scotswood	United Kingdom	For Cicero Brown.
24 October	Bearn	Steamship	Barrow Ship Building Co. Ltd.	Barrow-in-Furness	United Kingdom	For Société Générale de Transport Maritimes à Vapeur.
24 October	Chittagong	Steamship	Messrs. Raylton Dixon & Co.	Middlesbrough	United Kingdom	For Messrs. Patrick Henderson & Co.
24 October	Dredger No. 5	Dredger	Messrs. H. M'Intyre & Co.	Merksworth	United Kingdom	For Dublin Port and Docks Board.
24 October	Glenfarg	Barque	Messrs. Alexander Stephen & Sons	Dundee	United Kingdom	For Messrs. W. O. Taylor & Co.
24 October	Gloucester City	Steamship	Messrs. Richardson, Duck & Co.	South Stockton-on-Tees	United Kingdom	For Messrs. Charles Hill & Sons.
24 October	Lindus	Steamship	Edward Withy & Co.	West Hartlepool	United Kingdom	For T. J. Parker.
25 October	Akaroa	Barque	Osbourne, Graham & Co.	Sunderland, County Durham	United Kingdom	For Shaw, Savill & Co.
25 October	Britannia	Steamship	Messrs. Thomas Royden & Sons	Liverpool	United Kingdom	For MM. Cyprien, Fabre et Cie.
25 October	Cantonnais	Steamship	Messrs. Scott & Co.	Cartsdyke	United Kingdom	For private owner.
25 October	Cordelia	Comus-class corvette		Portsmouth Dockyard	United Kingdom	For Royal Navy.
25 October	Stefanie	Steamship	Messrs. Caird & Purdie	Barrow-in-Furness	United Kingdom	For Adria Steamship Co.
26 October	Ganges	Steamship	Barrow Ship Building Co. Ltd.	Barrow-in-Furness	United Kingdom	For Peninsular and Oriental Steam Navigation Company.
26 October	Señora Cue	Steamship	Messrs. Hodgson & Sons	Blythy	United Kingdom	For Hispano Francisco.
26 October	Stamboul	Steamship	Messrs. A. M'Millan & Son	Dumbarton	United Kingdom	For Compagnie de Navigation Fraissinet.
27 October	Saigon	Steamship	Messrs. Caird & Co.	Greenock	United Kingdom	For Compagnie des Messageries Maritimes.
29 October	Albatros	Wheeled aviso	Chantier naval Claparède et Cie	Petit-Quevilly	France	For French Navy
October	Vigilant	Steamship	Messrs. Lobnitz & Co.	Renfrew	United Kingdom	For Suez Canal Company.
October	Polyxene	Steamship	Motala		Sweden	For Grefere Knuth.
October	Wasdale	Steamship	Whitehaven Shipbuilding Co.	Whitehaven	United Kingdom	For J. D. Newton.
October	No. 213	Steam launch	Messrs. Seath & Co.	Rutherglen	United Kingdom	For Irrawaddy Flotilla Co.
3 November	Duncrag	Barque	Messrs. Russell & Co.	Port Glasgow	United Kingdom	For Messrs. Dunn & Co.
3 November	Nant Francon	Steamship	Messrs. J. Readhead & Co.	South Shields	United Kingdom	For Messrs. R. & D. Jones.
3 November	Santa Cecilia	Steam yacht	John Elder & Co.	Govan	United Kingdom	For Lord Alfred Paget.
5 November	Carisbrooke	Steamship	Messrs. W. Gray & Co	West Hartlepool	United Kingdom	For Messrs. Pearson & Foster.
5 November	Coningsby	Steamship	Messrs. W. Gray & Co	West Hartlepool	United Kingdom	For Messrs. Gladstone & Cornforth.
5 November	Darjiling	Merchantman	Messrs. Oswald, Mordaunt & Co.	Southampton	United Kingdom	For Messrs. E. Bates & Sons.
5 November	Grafton	Steamship	Robert Thompson & Sons	Sunderland	United Kingdom	For Grafton Steam Shipping Co.
5 November	Highland Chief	Barque	Ramage & Ferguson	Leith	United Kingdom	For Messrs. Crane, Colvil & Co.
5 November	The Mosquito	Pilot boat	F. Phillipps	Cardiff	United Kingdom	For Thomas Richards.
5 November	Teutonia	Steamship	Messrs. Schlesinger, Davis & Co.	Wallsend	United Kingdom	For Messrs Ward & Holsapfel.
5 November	Unnamed	Paddle steamer	Messrs. J. T. Eltringham & Co.	South Shields	United Kingdom	For Messrs. J. Hepple & Co.
8 November	Antonio Lopez	Steamship	Messrs. Denny Bros.	Dumbarton	United Kingdom	For Lopez & Co.
8 November	Elemore	Steamship	S. P. Austin & Son	Sunderland	United Kingdom	For Sharp & Co.
8 November	Mary Armstead	Schooner	Paul Rodgers	Carrickfergus	United Kingdom	For Messrs. James Fisher & Sons.
8 November	Odin	Steamship	Messrs. Lobnitz & Co.	Renfrew	United Kingdom	For private owner.
8 November	Popenjoy	Steamship	Messrs. Raylton Dixon & Co.	Middlesbrough	United Kingdom	For private owner.
8 November	Principia	Steamship	Palmer's Shipbuilding and Iron Company (Limited)	Jarrow	United Kingdom	For Messrs. Newton Bros.
9 November	Iolani	Steamship	Messrs. Murdoch & Murray	Port Glasgow	United Kingdom	For Messrs. Raeburn & Verci, or Messrs. Rayburn & Vereil.
9 November	Loch Torridon	Merchantman	Messrs. Barclay, Curle & Co.	Whiteinch	United Kingdom	For General Shipping Company.
9 November	Ludgate Hill	Steamship	Messrs. Dobie & Co.	Govan	United Kingdom	For Twin Screw Line.
9 November	Silver Lining	Barquentine	Messrs. Upham Bros.	Brixham	United Kingdom	For private owner.
10 November	Risveglio	Steamship	Messrs. H. M'Intyre & Co.	Merksworth	United Kingdom	For Sr. Carlo Raggio.
10 November	Sevilla	Steamship	Messrs. Henry Murray & Co.	Port Glasgow	United Kingdom	For Messrs. Henry Lamont & Co.
10 November	Sophie	Carola-class corvette	Kaiserliche Werft	Danzig	Germany	For Kaiserliche Marine.
11 November	Nanna	Steamship	Motala	Lindholmen	Sweden	For John Giertsen and others.
12 November	Bothnia	Steamship	Campbeltown Shipbuilding Company	Campbeltown	United Kingdom	For Baltic Steamship Company (Limited).
12 November	Clynder	Barque	Messrs. Russell & Co.	Cartsdyke	United Kingdom	For private owner.
12 November	Jean Dupuis	Steamship	Messrs. Scott & Co.	Cartsdyke	United Kingdom	For private owner.
12 November	Success	Smack	Messrs. John Wray & Sons	Burton Stather	United Kingdom	For R. Hellyer.
12 November	Valeria	Steamship	Messrs. Charles Hill & Sons	Bristol	United Kingdom	For private owner.
19 November	Catherine	Fishing boat	Messrs. Scott's	Dundee	United Kingdom	For private owner.
19 November	Sury Wongse	Steamship	Messrs. Wigham, Richardson & Co.	Low Walker	United Kingdom	For Messrs. A. Markwald & Co.
21 November	Claremont	Steamship	T. & T. W. Smith	North Shields	United Kingdom	For Messrs. Fisher, Renwick & Co.
21 November	Magician	Merchantman	Messrs. Richardson, Duck & Co.	South Stockton	United Kingdom	For Messrs. Nevins, Welch & Co.
22 November	Archimede	Steamship	Messrs. Alexander Stephen & Co.	Pointhouse	United Kingdom	For I. & V. Florio & Co.
22 November	Athabasca	Steamship	Messrs. M. Pearse & Co	Stockton-on-Tees	United Kingdom	For Messrs. William Tapscott & Co.
22 November	Nuphar	Steamship	Tyne Iron Shipbuilding Company (Limited)	Willington Quay	United Kingdom	For Messrs. Joseph Robinson & Co.
23 November	Catanian	Steamship	Messrs. Edward Withy & Co. Ltd.	Middleton	United Kingdom	For Messrs. Hugh Blaik & Co.
23 November	Deerhound	Steamship	Messrs. W. Allsup & Sons	Preston	United Kingdom	For private owner.
23 November	Eleanor	Paddle steamer	Cammell Laird	Birkenhead	United Kingdom	For London and North Western Railway.
23 November	Jacob Christensen	Steamship	Raylton Dixon & Co.	Middlesbrough	United Kingdom	For Jacob Christensen, or Hans Konow & Co.
23 November	Leonora	Steamship	London and Glasgow Iron and Shipbuilding Company	Govan	United Kingdom	For Messrs. J. T. Nickels & Co, or Linea de Vapore Serra Bilbao.
23 November	Neptune	Dredger	Messrs. W. Simons & Co.	Renfrew	United Kingdom	For Lancashire and Yorkshire Railway.
23 November	Saxon	Steamship	Messrs. Turnbull & Son	Whitby	United Kingdom	For Messrs. Rowland & Robinson.
24 November	Omniopolis	Steamship	Messrs. Scott & Co.	Bowling	United Kingdom	For private owner.
25 November	Aries	Steam yacht	Barrow Ship Building Co. Ltd.	Barrow-in-Furness	United Kingdom	For Sir James Ramsden.
25 November	Dacca	Steamship	Messrs. A. & J. Inglis	Pointhouse	United Kingdom	For British India Association Line.
25 November	Francis Grenier	Steamship	Messrs. Scott & Co.	Greenock	United Kingdom	For private owner.
26 November	Deuteros	Steamship	Flensburger Schiffbau-Gesellschaft	Flensburg	Germany	For "Flensburg Steam Navigation Company of 1869".
26 November	Walden Abbey	Merchantman	Messrs. W. H. Potter & Son	Liverpool	United Kingdom	For Messrs. James Poole & Co.
November	Carleton	Merchantman	Messrs. John Reid & Co.	Port Glashow	United Kingdom	For Messrs. John Kerr & Co.
November	Marshall	Coal boat		Leeds	United Kingdom	For Leeds Co-operative Society.
November	Sapphire	Steamship	Messrs. J. Fullarton & Co.	Paisley	United Kingdom	For William Robertson.
3 December	Elsie	Merchantman	Joseph L. Thompson & Sons	Sunderland	United Kingdom	For Messrs. James Gray & partners.
3 December	Heroine	Comus-class corvette		Devonport Dockyard	United Kingdom	For Royal Navy.
5 December	City of Antwerp	Steamship	John Blumer & Co.	Sunderland	United Kingdom	For Palgrave, Murphy & Co.
5 December	Lavion	Steamship	Messrs. Schlesinger, Davis & Co.	Wallsend	United Kingdom	For La Société Française des Steamers de l'Ouest.
6 December	Antverpia	Steamship	Messrs. C. S. Swan, Hunter & Co.	Wallsend-on-Tyne	United Kingdom	For Société Anonyme Anversoise D'Armement et de Transports Maritimes.
6 December	Dauntless	Paddle tug	J. T. Eltringham	South Shields	United Kingdom	For Waterford Steamship Company.
6 December	Everest	Steamship	Messrs. W. Gray & Co.	Hartlepool	United Kingdom	For Messrs. Murrell & Yeoman.
6 December	James Wishaw	Steamship	Messrs. W. Pearse & Co.	Stockton-on-Tees	United Kingdom	For Messrs. Tully & Co.
6 December	North Cambria	Steamship	Messrs. Palmer's Shipbuilding and Iron Company (Limited)	Howden	United Kingdom	For Messrs. Hugh Roberts & Son.
6 December	Remus	Steamship	Messrs. H. M'Intyre & Co.	Paisley	United Kingdom	For William Watt.
7 December	Athenian	Steamship	Atken and Mansell	Whiteinch	United Kingdom	For Union Steamship Company.
7 December	Clutha	Barquentine	Messrs. Barr & Shearer	Ardrossan	United Kingdom	For Messrs. Munn.
8 December	Lynx	Fishing smack	Messrs. John & Daniel Dewdry Brothers	Brixham	United Kingdom	For W. Furneaux.
8 December	Progreso	Dredger	Messrs. J. & G. Rennie	Greenwich	United Kingdom	For Argentine Government.
8 December	Scotia	Steamship	Messrs. S. & H. Morton & Co.	Leith	United Kingdom	For private owner.
8 December	Siren	Merchantman	Messrs. Barclay, Curle & Co.	Whiteinch	United Kingdom	For Messrs. A. & J. H. Carmichael.
9 December	Mouhout	Steamship	Messrs. Scott & Co.	Cartsdyke	United Kingdom	For private owner.
10 December	Garrawalt	Steamship	Messrs. Alexander Hall & Co.	Aberdeen	United Kingdom	For Aberdeen and Glasgow Steam Company (Limited).
10 December	Victoria Regina	Steamship	Messrs. Oswald, Mordaunt & Co.	Southampton	United Kingdom	For John Coupland.
10 December	Zodiac	Steamship	Earle's Shipbuilding Co	Hull	United Kingdom	For Grimsby and North Sea Steam Fishing Company (Limited).
17 December	Rydal Fell	Steamship	Messrs. Murdoch & Murray	Port Glasgow	United Kingdom	For Messrs. Hume, Smith & Co.
19 December	Chiloe	Steamship	Messrs. John Elder & Co.	Fairfield	United Kingdom	For Pacific Steam Navigation Company.
19 December	Sultana	Steamship	Robert Thompson & Sons	Southwick	United Kingdom	For John Redfern.
19 December	Torch	Steamship	Messrs. Robert Duncan & Co.	Port Glasgow	United Kingdom	For Clyde Lighthouse Trustees.
20 December	Belgravia	Ocean liner	D. &. W. Henderson & Co. Ltd.	Meadowside	United Kingdom	For Anchor Line.
20 December	Bucarest	Steamship	Messrs. A. McMillan & Son	Dumbarton	United Kingdom	For Compagnie Fraissinet.
20 December	Farmer's Boy	Fishing vessel	James Duncan	Kingston-on-Spey	United Kingdom	For William Murray.
20 December	Hoen	Steamship	Motala Verkstad	Lindholmen	Sweden	For Det Forenede Dampskib Skelskab.
20 December	Hyacinth	Satellite-class sloop		Devonport Dockyard	United Kingdom	For Royal Navy.
20 December	Manapouri	Steamship	Messrs. William Denny & Bros.	Dumbarton	United Kingdom	For Union Steamship Company of New Zealand (Limited).
20 December	Orion	Steamship	Messrs. Caird & Co.	Greenock	United Kingdom	For Österreichischer Lloyd.
21 December	Aberdeen	Cargo liner	Robert Napier and Sons	Govan	United Kingdom	For Aberdeen Line.
21 December	Austral	Passenger ship	John Elder & Co.	Govan	United Kingdom	For Orient Steam Navigation Company.
21 December	Elk	Steamship	Osbourne, Graham & Co.	Sunderland	United Kingdom	For Jackson Bros. & Cory. or Messrs. Corry, Lohden & Jackson.
21 December	Foscolino	Steamship	William Pickersgill & Sons	Sunderland	United Kingdom	For Wear Steam Ship Co. Ltd.
21 December	Gulf of Saint Vincent	Steamship	Messrs. William Gray & Co.	West Hartlepool	United Kingdom	For Greenock Steamship Company.
21 December	Minard Castle	Steamship	Messrs. Raylton Dixon & Co.	Middlesbrough	United Kingdom	For Castle Line.
21 December	Roxburgh	Steamship	Messrs. Palmer's Shipbuilding and Iron Company (Limited)	Newcastle upon Tyne	United Kingdom	For Caledonian Steamship Company (Limited).
21 December	Sorrento	Refrigerated cargo ship	Messrs. Alexander Stephen & Sons	Linthouse	United Kingdom	For Messrs. Robert M. Sloman & Co.
22 December	Ahdeck	Steamship	Messrs. Short Bros.	Pallion	United Kingdom	For Messrs. Walker & Butchart.
22 December	Bergamo	Steamship	Messrs. R. H. Green & Co.	Blackwall	United Kingdom	For Messrs. Tonomé.
22 December	D. J. Lawlor	Schooner	Dennison J. Lawlor	North Weymouth, Massachusetts	United States	For William V. Abbott, Abel F. Hayden and James H. Reid.
22 December	Elginshire	Steamship	Messrs. Edward Withy & Co.	Middleton	United Kingdom	For Messrs. Turnbull, Martin & Co.
22 December	Hansa	Steamship	Messrs. James & George Thompson	Clydebank	United Kingdom	For Hamburg-Amerikanische Packetfahrt-Actien-Gesellschaft.
22 December	Merton Hall	Steamship	Gourlay Bros.	Dundee	United Kingdom	For Caledonian Steamship Company Limited.
22 December	Moor	Steamship		River Clyde	United Kingdom	For Union Steamship Company.
22 December	Quiraing	Steamship	Messrs. Blackwood & Gordon	Port Glasgow	United Kingdom	For Australasian Steam Navigation Company.
22 December	Sutlej	Steamship	Barrow Ship Building Co. Ltd.	Barrow-in-Furness	United Kingdom	For Peninsular and Oriental Steam Navigation Company.
23 December	Borneo	Steamship	Messrs. Campbell, Mackintosh & Bowstead	Scotswood	United Kingdom	For Messrs. E. Boustead & Co.
23 December	Huntingtower	Steamship	Messrs. Wigham, Richardson & Co.	Low Walker	United Kingdom	For Messrs. Stumore, Weston & Co.
23 December	Moor	Steamship		Clydebank	United Kingdom	For Union Steamship Company.
24 December	Sardine	Hareng-class fishery protection vessel	Chantiers et Ateliers Augustin Normand	Le Havre	France	For French Navy
24 December	B. Kemeny	Steamship		Dumbarton	United Kingdom	For Adria Steamship Company.
24 December	Melbourne	Steamship	Compagnie des Messageries Maritimes	La Ciotat	France	For Compagnie des Messageries Maritimes.
26 December	Douglas	Steamship	Messrs. Hall, Russell & Co.	Aberdeen	United Kingdom	For Messrs. Douglas, Lapraik & Co.
27 December	Ashford	Steamship	Joseph L. Thompson & Sons	Sunderland	United Kingdom	For Thompson, Wrightson & Co.
28 December	Afrikaan	Steamship	Messrs. Raylton Dixon & Co.	Middlesbrough	United Kingdom	For Nieuwe Afrikaan Maatschappij.
28 December	Dingyuan	Dingyuan-class ironclad	AG Vulcan	Stettin	Germany	For Imperial Chinese Navy.
28 December	General Roberts	Steamship	Palmer's Shipbuilding and Iron Company (Limited)	Jarrow	United Kingdom	For Messrs. Barnes, Guthrie & Co.
28 December	Goldcliffe	Steamship	Palmer's Shipbuilding and Iron Company (Limited)	Howden	United Kingdom	For Messrs. D. H. Morgan & Co.
31 December	Cumbria	Steam yacht	Messrs. C. Mitchell & Co.	Low Walker	United Kingdom	For Earl of Lonsdale.
31 December	Inchboroa	Steamship	Messrs. C. Mitchell & Co.	Low Walker	United Kingdom	For Messrs. Harrison, Fraser & Co.
31 December	Mahinapua	Steamship	Messrs. William Denny & Bros	Dumbarton	United Kingdom	For Union Steamship Company of New Zealand.
December	En Avant	Paddle steamer	John Cockerill	Seraing / Stanley Pool	Belgium /	For Association International del Congo.
December	Ting-Yuen	Ironclad	AG Vulcan	Stettin	Germany	For Imperial Chinese Navy.
Unknown date	Accretive	Steamship	S. P. Austin	Sunderland	United Kingdom	For T. Stockdale.
Unknown date	Adelita	Steam yacht		East Boston, Massachusetts	United States	For private owner.
Unknown date	Ahdeek	Merchantman	Short Bros.	Sunderland	United Kingdom	For Walker & Butchart.
Unknown date	Alaska	Fishing trawler		Boothbay, Maine	United States	For private owner.
Unknown date	Albert	Paddle steamer	Messrs. MacIlwain & Lewis	Belfast	United Kingdom	For Cork, Blackrock & Passage Railway.
Unknown date	Andalusia	Steamship	The Strand Slipway Co.	Sunderland	United Kingdom	For H. Scholefield & Son.
Unknown date	Annie Larsen	Schooner	Hall Brothers	Port Blakeley, Bainbridge Island, Washington	(United States) Washington Territory	For James Tuft.
Unknown date	Arctic	Tug	Rand & Burger	Manitowoc, Wisconsin	United Kingdom	For Goodrich Transportation Company.
Unknown date	Beneficent	Merchantman	Short Bros.	Sunderland	United Kingdom	For James Westoll.
Unknown date	Bonnie Doon	Steamship			United Kingdom	For Liverpool, Llandudno, and Welsh Coast Steamship Co.
Unknown date	Boscabel	Tug		Chicago, Illinois	United States	For private owner.
Unknown date	Brahma	Steamship		Lindholmen	Sweden	For private owner.
Unknown date	Bushire	Steamship	Messrs. Wigham, Richardson & Co.	Low Walker	United Kingdom	For Persian Gulf Steam Navigation Co.
Unknown date	Byzantia	Steamship	Messrs. C. Mitchell & Co.	Low Walker	United Kingdom	For private owner.
Unknown date	Cameta	Paddle steamer	Messrs. Laird Bros.	Birkenhead	United Kingdom	For Amazon Steam Navigation Co.
Unknown date	Capri	Merchantman	John Blumer & Co.	Sunderland	United Kingdom	For R. M. Sloman & Co.
Unknown date	Caracas	Steamship	William Cramp & Sons	location	United States	For Red D Line.
Unknown date	Carrie Harvey	Schooner	David Banks & Co.	Plymouth	United Kingdom	For Thomas B. Harvey.
Unknown date	Chancellor	Steamship	Messrs. Raylton Dixon & Co.	Middlesbrough	United Kingdom	For Messrs. Edward Harris & Co.
Unknown date	Charrington	Steamship	James Laing	Sunderland	United Kingdom	For J. H. Culliford & Mr. Clark.
Unknown date	Clan Monroe	Steamship	Bartram, Haswell & Co.	Sunderland	United Kingdom	For Clan Line.
Unknown date	Clytha	Steamship	Tyne Iron Shipbuilding Co.	Newcastle upon Tyne	United Kingdom	For Messrs. Stephens, Mawson & Co.
Unknown date	Congella	Merchantman	William Doxford & Sons	Sunderland	United Kingdom	For Bullard, King & Co.
Unknown date	Congo	Merchantman	James Laing	Sunderland	United Kingdom	For G. H. Wills & Co.
Unknown date	Corean	Steamship	James Laing	Sunderland	United Kingdom	For J. & A. Allan.
Unknown date	Corrwg	Merchantman	William Pickersgill & Sons	Sunderland	United Kingdom	For W. Perch.
Unknown date	Creole	Merchantman	Joseph L. Thompson & Sons	Sunderland	United Kingdom	For J. Dent & Co.
Unknown date	Critic	Merchantman	Joseph L. Thompson & Sons	Sunderland	United Kingdom	For J. Dent & Co.
Unknown date	Crystal	Steamship	Joseph L. Thompson & Sons	Sunderland	United Kingdom	For J. Dent & Co.
Unknown date	Diogenes	Lima-class cruiser	Howaldtswerke	Kiel	Germany	For Peruvian Navy.
Unknown date	Ecuador	Steamship	Messrs. Laird Bros.	Birkenhead	United Kingdom	For Pacific Steam Navigation Company.
Unknown date	El Rayo	Torpedo boat	William Doxford & Sons Ltd.	Pallion	United Kingdom	For William Doxford & Sons Ltd.
Unknown date	Fenian Ram	Submarine	De Lamater Iron Works	New York	United States	For Fenian Brotherhood.
Unknown date	Finchley	Merchantman	John Blumer & Co,	Sunderland	United Kingdom	For Watt, Ward & Co.
Unknown date	Fleetwood	Steamboat		Portland, Oregon	United States	For U. B. Scott and associates.
Unknown date	Geiser	Steamship	Burmeister & Wain	Copenhagen	Denmark	For Thingvalla Line.
Unknown date	Glenelder	Steamship	Messrs. Alexander Hall & Co.	Aberdeen	United Kingdom	For John Fleming.
Unknown date	Gloucester	Fishing smack			United Kingdom	For W. Butt.
Unknown date	Godalming	Steamship	Blumer & Co.	Sunderland	United Kingdom	For C. E. Lamplough.
Unknown date	Gordonia	Merchantman	Joseph L. Thompson & Sons	Sunderland	United Kingdom	For Gordon & Stamp.
Unknown date	Grezia	Steamship	Messrs. C. Mitchell & Co.	Low Walker	United Kingdom	For private owner.
Unknown date	Gudrun	Yawl		Gosport	United Kingdom	For private owner.
Unknown date	Heibetnuma	Cruiser		Constantinople	Ottoman Empire	For Ottoman Navy.
Unknown date	Holly	Lighthouse tender	Malster & Reaney	Baltimore, Maryland	United States	For United States Lighthouse Service.
Unknown date	Hong Kong	Steamship	Messrs. Wigham Richardson & Co.	Walker, Newcastle upon Tyne	United Kingdom	For William Milburn & Co.
Unknown date	Iberia	Steamship	Messrs. S. H. Morton & Co.	Leith	United Kingdom	For Messrs. Cyprien, Fabre et Cie.
Unknown date	Iota	Gunboat	Messrs. C. Mitchell & Son	Low Walker	United Kingdom	For Imperial Chinese Navy.
Unknown date	Ivanhoe	Steamship	Messrs. Murdoch & Murray	Port Glasgow	United Kingdom	For Messrs. George Hood & Co.
Unknown date	Jason	Barque	Rødsverven	Sandefjord	Norway	For Christen Christensen.
Unknown date	Jessamine	Lighthouse tender	Malster & Reaney	Baltimore, Maryland	United Kingdom	For United States Lighthouse Service.
Unknown date	John B. Lyon	Steamship	Thomas Quale & Sons	Cleveland, Ohio	United States	For private owner.
Unknown date	Kant	Steamship	D. Baxter & Co.	Sunderland	United Kingdom	For Lübeck Königsberger Dampfschiffs Gesellschaft.
Unknown date	Kappa	Gunboat	Messrs. C. Mitchell & Son	Low Walker	United Kingdom	For Imperial Chinese Navy.
Unknown date	Kingsley	Steamship	Messrs. T. & W. Smith.	North Shields	United Kingdom	For Messrs. Edward Eccles & Partners.
Unknown date	Kirkheaton	Steamship	Messrs. Hodgson & Soulsby	Blyth	United Kingdom	For private owner.
Unknown date	La Gitana	Steam yacht		Loch Rannock	United Kingdom	For private owner.
Unknown date	Laju	Merchantman	James Laing	Sunderland	United Kingdom	For Wright Bros. & Co.
Unknown date	Lambda	Gunboat	Messrs. C. Mitchell & Son	Low Walker	United Kingdom	For Imperial Chinese Navy.
Unknown date	Laurel	Merchantman	William Doxford & Sons	Sunderland	United Kingdom	For Hopper & Crosby.
Unknown date	La Ville de Rosario	Steamship	Société Nouvelle des Forges et Chantiers de la Méditerranée	La Seyne-sur-Mer	France	For private owner.
Unknown date	Lisette	Schooner			Germany	For Johan Georg Oestman.
Unknowndate	Lizzie	Steam yacht	Messrs. Alexander Hall & Co.	Aberdeen	United Kingdom	For John G. Mackie.
Unknown date	Magician	Corvette	William Doxford & Sons Ltd.	Pallion	United Kingdom	For Royal Navy.
Unknown date	Manzanillo	Sternwheeler	Charles Bureau	Portland, Oregon	United States	For People's Freighting Co.
Unknown date	Maud Hartmann	Steamship	Messrs. Schlesinger, Davis & Co.	Wallsend	United Kingdom	For Messrs. Ward & Holzapfel.
Unknown date	Molly Bawn	Steam yacht	W. Allsup & Sons	Preston	United Kingdom	For J. Paley.
Unknown date	Montserrat	Steamship	Messrs. Hodgson & Soulsby	Blyth	United Kingdom	For private owner.
Unknown date	Mytilene	Steamship	Short Bros	Sunderland	United Kingdom	For Lumsdon, Byers & Co.
Unknown date	Nantland Castle	Ketch	Messrs. Carnegie & Mathew	Peterhead	United Kingdom	For private owner.
Unknown date	Natal	Steamship		La Ciotat	France	For private owner.
Unknown date	Pallas	Steamship	Raylton Dixon & Co.	Middlesbrough	United Kingdom	For Clark George Ltd.
Unknown date	Panama	Merchantman	Osbourne, Graham & Co.	Sunderland	United Kingdom	For D'Orbigny & Faustin Fils.
Unknown date	Paul	Tug	Messrs. Laird Bros.	Birkenhead	United Kingdom	For private owner.
Unknown date	Phosphor Bronze	Steam launch		River Thames	United Kingdom	For Phosphor Bronze Co. Ltd.
Unknown date	Phuoc Kien	Steamship	Messrs. Scott & Co.	Cartsdyke	United Kingdom	For private owner.
Unknown date	Princess	Paddle steamer	Jarvis & Burridge	Winnipeg	Canada	For private owner.
Unknown date	Puerto Huergo	Tug	Messrs. R. H. Green	Blackwall	United Kingdom	For private owner.
Unknown date	Raisby	Merchantman	Short Bros.	Sunderland	United Kingdom	For J. S. Barwick.
Unknown date	Ravenshaugh	Steamship	Palmer's Shipbuilding and Iron Co. (Limited)	Jarrow	United Kingdom	For Messrs. Bowser & Ormston.
Unknown date	Rhodora	Merchantman	James Laing	Sunderland	United Kingdom	For F. Edwards.
Unknown date	Rosella	Merchantman	Joseph L. Thompson & Sons	Sunderland	United Kingdom	For John H. Barry.
Unknown date	Seizer	Sternwheeler		Stockton, California	United States	For United States Army Corps of Engineers.
Unknown date	Serpho	Merchantman	James Laing	Sunderland	United Kingdom	For W. & T. W. Pinkney.
Unknown date	Silverdale	Merchantman	Short Bros.	Sunderland	United Kingdom	For Milburn Bros.
Unknown date	Skerne	Merchantman	Strand Slipway Co.	Sunderland	United Kingdom	For private owner.
Unknown date	Stormcock	Tug	Messrs. R. & H. Green	Blackwall	United Kingdom	For Messrs. Holland, Doust & Co.
Unknown date	Sunrise	Steamship			United Kingdom	For Messrs. Cammell, Woolf, and Haigh.
Unknown date	Tannadice	Merchantman	William Doxford & Sons	Sunderland	United Kingdom	For Eastern & Australian Steamship Co Ltd.
Unknown date	Terge Viken	Steamship	Motala	Norrköping	Sweden	For Consul Peterson.
Unknown date	Thetis	Steamship	Alexander Stephen & Sons	Dundee	United Kingdom	For private owner.
Unknown date	Thyra	Steamship	Flensburg Iron Shipbuilding Company	Flensburg	Germany	For Bruhn & Co.
Unknown date	Underwriter	Tug	John H. Dialogue	Camden, New Jersey	United Kingdom	For private owner.
Unknown date	Vercingetorix	Merchantman	John Blumer & Co.	Sunderland	United Kingdom	For Delmas Frères.
Unknown date	Victoria	Coaster	W. Allsup & Sons	Preston	United Kingdom	For W. Allsup & Sons.
Unknown date	Ville de Brugie	Steamship	Mr. Forrestt	London	United Kingdom	For A. Rickard.
Unknown date	Ville de Lisbonne	Merchantman	James LAing	Sunderland	United Kingdom	For Eugene Grosos.
Unknown date	Waxholm	Steamship	Bergsunds Mekaniska Verkstad	Södermalm	Sweden	For Waxholmsbolaget.
Unknown date	Westport	Steamship	Messrs. Murdoch & Murray	Port Glasgow	United Kingdom	For Mr. Williams.
Unknown date	Wisconsin	Steamship	Dry Dock Complex	Detroit, Michigan	United States	For Goodrich Line.
Unknown date	No. 70	Torpedo boat	Messrs. Thorneycroft	Chiswick	United Kingdom	For Royal Navy.
Unknown date	Two unnamed vessels	Dredgers	Osbourne, Graham & Co.	Sunderland	United Kingdom	For private owners.
