= List of shipwrecks in August 1881 =

The list of shipwrecks in August 1881 includes ships sunk, foundered, grounded, or otherwise lost during August 1881.

== 1 August ==
List of shipwrecks: 1 August 1881
Ship	State	Description
Campana	United Kingdom	The barque capsized at South Shields, County Durham.
Carlotta	United Kingdom	The steam yacht capsized at Row, Dunbartonshire and was severely damaged.
Edith	United Kingdom	The steam launch foundered in the Thames Estuary 4 nautical miles (7.4 km) north east of Garrison Point, Isle of Sheppey, Kent. Her crew were rescued by a Coastguard boat. She was refloated on 3 August and taken into Whitstable, Kent.
Eugenie	France	The schooner sprang a leak and sank in the English Channel 7 nautical miles (13 km) off Beachy Head, Sussex, United Kingdom. All four people on board survived.
Gleaner	United Kingdom	The smack ran aground and sank at Peel, Isle of Man. She was on a voyage from Barrow-in-Furness, Lancashire to Newport, Monmouthshire.
Lasker	Germany	The barque collided with the steamship Helios (United Kingdom) and sank off the coast of Zeeland, Netherlands. Lasker was on a voyage from Antwerp, Belgium to Iquique, Peru.
Peter James	United Kingdom	The schooner was driven ashore at West Cowes, Isle of Wight. She was on a voyage from Liverpool, Lancashire to London.

== 3 August ==
List of shipwrecks: 3 August 1881
Ship	State	Description
Augusta	Sweden	The schooner capsized at Utklippan.
E. D. Bigelow	United States	The ship ran aground on Sarn Badrig 4 nautical miles (7.4 km) off Dyffryn, Cardiganshire, United Kingdom. She was on a voyage from Annapolis, Maryland to Liverpool, Lancashire, United Kingdom.
Merannio	United Kingdom	The steamship collided with the steamship Fenton and was beached at East Greenwich, Middlesex. She was refloated and docked.

== 4 August ==
List of shipwrecks: 4 August 1881
Ship	State	Description
Calcutta	United States	The ship was wrecked on the coast of Caffraria, Cape Colony. She was on a voyage from "Zebu", Spanish East Indies to Boston, Massachusetts.
Dunoon Castle	United Kingdom	The paddle steamer was severely damaged by fire at Glasgow, Renfrewshire.
Magdeburg	United Kingdom	The steamship was driven ashore at Gävle, Sweden.

== 5 August ==
List of shipwrecks: 5 August 1881
Ship	State	Description
Periere	France	The steamship caught fire at Golette, Tunisia and was scuttled. She was refloated on 9 August and taken to Marseille, Bouches-du-Rhône for repairs.

== 6 August ==
List of shipwrecks: 6 August 1881
Ship	State	Description
Bina Campbell	United Kingdom	The barque ran aground in the Clyde at Dumbarton Castle, Dunbartonshire. She was then run into by another vessel. Bina Campbell was on a voyage from Glasgow, Renfrewshire to Montevideo, Uruguay. She was later refloated and put back to Glasgow for repairs.

== 8 August ==
List of shipwrecks: 8 August 1881
Ship	State	Description
Clara B. Warren	United States	The schooner was wrecked on Duncan's Reef, Catch Harbour, Nova Scotia, Canada. Her crew were rescued.
Isaac Pereire	France	The steamship caught fire at Tunis, Tunisia and was scuttled. She was later refloated, repaired and returned to service.
Lord Belgrave	United Kingdom	The paddle steamer caught fire and sank in the River Dee at Chester, Cheshire. Arson was suspected as the cause.
ARA Pilocmayo	Argentine Navy	The flat-iron gunboat was holed by an anchor and sank at Buenos Aires.

== 9 August ==
List of shipwrecks: 9 August 1881
Ship	State	Description
Hugo	Germany	The ship was destroyed by fire in the Pacific Ocean and was abandoned by her crew. She was on a voyage from Newcastle upon Tyne, Northumberland to San Francisco, California, United States. Her ten crew took to a lifeboat. Nine survivors reached Chiloe, Chile on 18 August, taking nine days to cover 800 nautical miles (1,500 km).

== 10 August ==
List of shipwrecks: 10 August 1881
Ship	State	Description
Baltic	United Kingdom	The barque ran aground on the Eagle Sand, in the North Sea off the coast of Essex.
Thracian	United Kingdom	The barque ran aground at Moulmein, Burma. She was on a voyage from Singapore, Straits Settlements to Moulmein. She was refloated on 14 August.
Unnamed	United Kingdom	The Mersey Flat sank on the East Hoyle Bank, in Liverpool Bay.

== 11 August ==
List of shipwrecks: 11 August 1881
Ship	State	Description
George Mills	United Kingdom	The barque was driven ashore on the coast of Uruguay. She was refloated and put into Maldonado, Uruguay in a leaky condition.
Georges	France	The schooner ran into the barque Clodian (United Kingdom) and sank in the North Sea 5 nautical miles (9.3 km) off Sea Palling, Norfolk, United Kingdom. Her crew survived. Georges was on a voyage from South Shields, County Durham, United Kingdom to Cannes, Alpes-Maritimes.

== 12 August ==
List of shipwrecks: 12 August 1881
Ship	State	Description
Emily	United Kingdom	The brig collided with the steamship Elysia (United Kingdom) and sank in the Atlantic Ocean (47°58′N 30°00′W). Her nine crew were rescued by Elysia. Emily was on a voyage from Saint John's, Newfoundland Colony to London.
Fair Maid	United Kingdom	The schooner ran aground on the Hale Sand, in the North Sea off the coast of Lincolnshire. She was on a voyage from Hull, Yorkshire to Lyme Regis, Dorset. She was refloated and made for the Humber, but consequently sank. Her crew were rescued by the tug Garibaldi (United Kingdom.
Mabel	United Kingdom	The schooner was driven ashore at Dunkirk, Nord, France.

== 13 August ==
List of shipwrecks: 13 August 1881
Ship	State	Description
Harmonia	Norway	The brig was driven ashore and wrecked at Haverdal, Sweden. She was on a voyage from Söderhamn, Sweden to Dunkirk, Nord, France.
Romano	United Kingdom	The steamship ran aground on the Holme Sand, in the Humber. She was on a voyage from Hull, Yorkshire to New York, United States. She was refloated the next day with the assistance of a number of tugs and put back to Hull.
T. B. Ord	United Kingdom	The barque collided with the schooner Isabel (France) at Callao, Peru and was severely damaged. She was on a voyage from Cardiff, Glamorgan to Callao.

== 14 August ==
List of shipwrecks: 14 August 1881
Ship	State	Description
Borunga	United Kingdom	The barque ran aground at Calais, France. She was refloated and taken into Calais.
Dunnikier	United Kingdom	The barque struck a rock and foundered in the Pacific Ocean off the coast of Chile. Her crew survived. She was on a voyage from Liverpool, Lancashire to Valparaíso, Chile.

== 15 August ==
List of shipwrecks: 15 August 1881
Ship	State	Description
Innisfallen	United Kingdom	The brig was driven ashore on Naissaar, Russia. She was on a voyage from Liverpool, Lancashire to Reval, Russia. She was refloated with the assistance of a tug.
Martha	Netherlands	The schooner capsized in the Ems.
W. F. March	United States	The schooner dragged her anchor during a gale and was wrecked in Golovnin Bay in the Department of Alaska. All seventeen people on board survived.

== 16 August ==
List of shipwrecks: 16 August 1881
Ship	State	Description
Frigorifique	France	The steamship was damaged by fire at Bordeaux, Gironde. She was on a voyage from Bordeaux to Antwerp, Belgium.

== 17 August ==
List of shipwrecks: 17 August 1881
Ship	State	Description
Unnamed	Flag unknown	The cutter yacht foundered in the English Channel 1 1/2 nautical miles (2.8 km) off Camber, Sussex, United Kingdom.

== 18 August ==
List of shipwrecks: 18 August 1881
Ship	State	Description
Forster	United Kingdom	The ship was wrecked at Amsterdam, North Holland, Netherlands. Her crew were rescued.
Tordenskjold	Norway	The ship was driven ashore. She was refloated and taken into Grimstad in a leaky condition.
Unnamed	Russia	The full-rigged ship was driven ashore in the Nieuwe Diep. She was on a voyage from Amsterdam, North Holland, Netherlands to Porvoo, Grand Duchy of Finland.

== 19 August ==
List of shipwrecks: 19 August 1881
Ship	State	Description
Gil	Portugal	The schooner collided with the barque Burnswark (United Kingdom) in the Kingroad, off the coast of Somerset, United Kingdom. She was beached on the Rifle Grounds.
Mary Kate	United Kingdom	The schooner ran aground at Liverpool, Lancashire. Her crew survived.

== 20 August ==
List of shipwrecks: 20 August 1881
Ship	State	Description
A. B. Ward	United States	The tug suffered a boiler explosion and sank in the Chicago River at the Clark Street Bridge, Chicago, Illinois with the loss of two of her crew. Subsequently refloated, towed to Miller's Dry Dock and rebuilt.
Courier	France	The schooner foundered at sea. Her crew took to a boat; they were rescued on 25 August by Golden Sea (United Kingdom). Courier was on a voyage from Saint-Pierre, Saint Pierre and Miquelon to Martinique.
Prima	Norway	The barque was driven ashore and wrecked at Zoutelande, Zeeland, Netherlands. She was on a voyage from Antwerp, Belgium to a Baltic port.

== 21 August ==
List of shipwrecks: 21 August 1881
Ship	State	Description
Eira	United Kingdom	Eira The steam yacht of Benjamin Leigh Smith was severely damaged by floating ice and sank near Cape Flora, Franz Joseph Land. The owner and his crew were rescued almost a year later. The wreck was located in 2018.
Livingstone	United Kingdom	The ship collided with HSwMS Norrköping (Swedish Navy) 8 nautical miles (15 km) off the south point of Öland, Sweden and was damaged. HSwMS Norrköping towed her to "Uttagan", where she took on a pilot with the intention of going into Kalmar. She ran aground off Grimskär, but was refloated the next day and taken into Kalmar.

== 23 August ==
List of shipwrecks: 23 August 1881
Ship	State	Description
Gordonia	United Kingdom	The steamship was driven ashore at Domsten, Sweden. She was on a voyage from South Shields, County Durham to Kronstadt, Russia. She was refloated and taken into Copenhagen, Denmark.

== 24 August ==
List of shipwrecks: 24 August 1881
Ship	State	Description
T. E. Aschehong	United Kingdom	The barque foundered at sea. Her crew survived. She was on a voyage from Hamburg, Germany to Baltimore, Maryland, United States.

== 25 August ==
List of shipwrecks: 25 August 1881
Ship	State	Description
Edgar	United Kingdom	The steamship was driven ashore north of Cape Hellas, Greece. She was on a voyage from Kronstadt to Nicholaieff, Russia. She was refloated on 27 August.
Endeavour	United Kingdom	The brig was driven ashore at Balbriggan, County Dublin. Her five crew were rescued by a Coastguard boat.
Maggie Lorimer	United Kingdom	The ship ran aground and sank at Glenarm, County Antrim. She was on a voyage from Glenarm to Glasgow, Renfrewshire.
Miranda	United Kingdom	The full-rigged ship was destroyed by fire in the "Goronlaia River", Netherlands East Indies. Her crew were rescued. She was on a voyage from Ternate, Netherlands East Indies to Singapore, Straits Settlements.
Providence	United Kingdom	The smack was driven ashore at Derk Point, County Donegal. She was on a voyage from Londonderry to Donegal. She was refloated with the assistance of the Coastguard.
Stratheden	United Kingdom	The barque was wrecked on Middle Cross Sand off Norfolk, England due to negligent navigation. She was on a voyage from Leith, Scotland to Rio de Janeiro, Brazil with coal. The crew were rescued by Caister lifeboat.

== 26 August ==
List of shipwrecks: 26 August 1881
Ship	State	Description
Adria	United Kingdom	The brigantine was wrecked at Bahia, Brazil.
Albert	Germany	The schooner was wrecked at Bahia.
Unnamed	Flag unknown	The brigantine foundered 8 nautical miles (15 km) off the Tuskar Rock with the loss of all hands.

== 27 August ==
List of shipwrecks: 27 August 1881
Ship	State	Description
Alphonse Marie	France	The ship was driven ashore and wrecked at Seaton Delaval, County Durham, United Kingdom. She was on a voyage from Dunkirk, Nord to Middlesbrough, Yorkshire, United Kingdom.
Condor	Germany	The ship foundered at sea. Her crew were rescued. She was on a voyage from Charlestown, Cornwall, United Kingdom to Aalborg, Denmark.
Emanuelle	Malta	The ship collided with the transport ship Oise (French Navy) off Cape Bon, Algeria. At least one of her crew got aboard Oise. Emanuelle was lost sight of 30 minutes later. She was on a voyage from Tripoli, Ottoman Tripolitania to Cardiff, Glamorgan, United Kingdom.
Weif	United Kingdom	The fishing smack sprang a leak and foundered in the North Sea. Her crew were rescued by the fishing smack Orphan Girl (United Kingdom).

== 29 August ==
List of shipwrecks: 29 August 1881
Ship	State	Description
Lion	United Kingdom	The ketch capsized 3 nautical miles (5.6 km) east of Looe, Cornwall and was wrecked. Her crew were rescued. She was on a voyage from Plymouth, Devon to Penzance, Cornwall.
Sanda	United Kingdom	The steamship ran aground in the Clyde near Dalmuir, Dunbartonshire.

== 30 August ==
List of shipwrecks: 30 August 1881
Ship	State	Description
City of Richmond	United States	The paddle steamer struck a reef south of Mark Island, Maine and sank without loss of life. She later was refloated, rebuilt and returned to service as City of Key West.
Teuton	United Kingdom	The steamship struck a rock and sank between Quoin Point and Cape Agulhas, Cape Colony with the loss of 236 lives. There were 36 survivors. Teuton was on a voyage from Cape Town, Cape Colony to the Natal Colony.
William Leckie	United Kingdom	The ship collided with Viola (United Kingdom) off the Old Head of Kinsale, County Cork and was severely damaged. She was towed into Queenstown, County Cork and beached.

== 31 August ==
List of shipwrecks: 31 August 1881
Ship	State	Description
Augustus, and Hector	United Kingdom	The steamships collided off the South Foreland, Kent and were both severely damaged. Augustus was on a voyage from New York, United States to Newcastle upon Tyne, Northumberland. She put into Dover, Kent waterlogged at the bow. Hector was on a voyage from London to Penang, Straits Settlements. She put back to London in a severely leaky condition.
Ellida	Norway	The barque ran aground off Rügen, Germany. She was on a voyage from Hartlepool, County Durham, United Kingdom to Stralsund, Germany. She was refloated and assisted into Stralsund.
Frey	Sweden	The schooner collided with the brig Mathilde (France) and was severely damaged. Frey was on a voyage from Vestervick to Hartlepool. She put into Copenhagen, Denmark.
Kilmodan	United Kingdom	The burning ship was abandoned off Cape Horn, Chile. Her crew were rescued by the barque Penrith (United Kingdom). Kilmodan was on a voyage from Port Glasgow, Renfrewshire to San Francisco, California, United States.
Mary Jamieson	United Kingdom	The schooner ran aground at the mouth of the Rio Grande and was wrecked. Her crew were rescued. She was on a voyage from Cette, Hérault, France to the Rio Grande.

== Unknown date ==
List of shipwrecks: Unknown date in August 1881
Ship	State	Description
Alliance	Norway	The barque ran aground at Bordeaux, Gironde, France. She was refloated.
Appin	United Kingdom	The steamship struck a sunken rock near "Ujusut", Russia and was beached. She was later refloated and taken into Nicholaieff, Russia, where she arrived on 22 August.
Aren	United Kingdom	The barque ran aground at Skellefteå, Sweden. She was on a voyage from Skellefteå to London, United Kingdom. She was refloated and resumed her voyage, but put into Copenhagen, Denmark in a leaky condition on 9 August.
Ashfield	United Kingdom	The steamship was driven ashore in Chesapeake Bay. She was on a voyage from Baltimore, Maryland, United States to Calais, France. She was later refloated and resumed her voyage.
Barmore	United Kingdom	The steamship ran aground in the Clyde near Dalmuir, Dunbartonshire. She was refloated with the assistance of a tug and taken into Bowling, Dunbartonshire for repairs.
Bedouin	United Kingdom	The steamship struck a rock at Louisbourg, Nova Scotia, Canada and was beached. She was on a voyage from New Orleans, Louisiana, United States to Louisbourg.
Catherina	Russia	The schooner was wrecked 1 nautical mile (1.9 km) east of St Abb's Head, Berwickshire, United Kingdom. Her four crew were rescued. She was on a voyage from Geestemünde to East Wemyss, Fife, United Kingdom.
Coral	United Kingdom	The yacht was driven ashore and severely damaged at Beaumaris, Anglesey.
Dora	United Kingdom	The barque was wrecked on the Red Bank. Her crew were rescued. She was on a voyage from the River Thames to the Gambia River.
Dunmore	United Kingdom	The steamship was driven ashore at Ballyquintin Point, County Down. She was on a voyage from Plymouth, Devon to Belfast, County Antrim.
Eleanor Jane	United Kingdom	The schooner ran aground at Barebäck, Sweden. She was on a voyage from Portmadoc, Caernarfonshire to Stettin, Germany. She was refloated and taken into Copenhagen.
Flensborg	Denmark	The barque was wrecked a cyclone in the Pescadores Islands. Her crew were rescued.
Freda	United Kingdom	The yacht was driven ashore and severely damaged at Beaumaris.
Granite City	United Kingdom	The barque ran aground on the Pollard Spit, in the North Sea off the north Kent coast.
Hadji	United Kingdom	The steamship was wrecked on the Blonde Rocks, off Seal Island, Nova Scotia. Her crew were rescued. She was on a voyage from Cow Bay, Nova Scotia to Portland.
Henry and Betsey	United Kingdom	The schooner collided with the steamship Ivanhoe (United Kingdom) and sank off Larne, County Antrim. Henry and Betsey was on a voyage from the Clyde to a port in County Antrim.
Hermione	United Kingdom	The brig ran aground on the Peveril Ledge, in the English Channel off the coast of Dorset. She was on a voyage from Newhaven, Sussex to Liverpool, Lancashire. She was later refloated and beached at Swanage, Dorset.
Il Trovatore	United Kingdom	The schooner collided with the steamship Palomares (United Kingdom) and sank in the North Sea off Winterton-on-Sea, Norfolk. Her crew were rescued. Il Trovatore was on a voyage from Leith, Lothian to Rotterdam, south Holland, Netherlands.
Kennaird	United Kingdom	The fishing boat collided with the schooner Mary and Catherine (United Kingdom) and sank in the North Sea with the loss of five of her six crew. The survivor was rescued by Mary and Catherine.
Lionel	United Kingdom	The brigantine struck a rock in Chedabucto Bay and was wrecked. Her crew were rescued. She was on a voyage from Plymouth, Devon to Charlottetown, Prince Edward Island, Canada.
Lisette	Germany	The full-rigged ship was driven ashore on Terschelling, Friesland, Netherlands.
Maria	Germany	The schooner struck the Braemar Rock. She put into Burntisland, Fife in a waterlogged condition.
Northern Light	United States	The wooden barge went aground on the coast of Lake Huron near Harrisville, Michigan, and eventually broke up in 2 feet (0.61 m) of water at 44.660267°N 83.286817°W.
Marie	Norway	The schooner was driven ashore at Cellardyke, Fife.
Mary Ann	United Kingdom	The Thames barge was severely damaged at Wells-next-the-Sea, Norfolk. She was on a voyage from Harwich, Essex to Wells-next-the-Sea.
Mischief	United Kingdom	The schooner was driven ashore and wrecked at "Cardenstown". Her crew survived.
Nellie Brett	United States	The barque was driven ashore at Shelbourne, Nova Scotia. She was on a voyage from Cádiz, Spain to New York.
Pathfinder	United Kingdom	The ship was driven ashore and wrecked at Bootle, Cumberland. Her crew were rescued. She was on a voyage from the Bull River to Silloth, Cumberland.
Plimsoll	United Kingdom	The ship was driven ashore at Saint-Valery-sur-Somme, Somme, France.
Racer	Flag unknown	The ship was run into by the steamship European (United Kingdom) and sank in the Atlantic Ocean.
Revolving Light	United Kingdom	The full-rigged ship ran aground at Bordeaux. She was on a voyage from Saint John, New Brunswick, Canada to Bordeaux.
Rierino	Austria-Hungary	The brig ran aground on the Colorados. Her crew survived. She was on a voyage from Santa Cruz de Cuba Captaincy General of Cuba to Bremen, Germany.
Sarah Jane	United Kingdom	The schooner was driven ashore at Seascale, Cumberland. Her crew were rescued. She was on a voyage from Bray, County Wicklow to Whitehaven, Cumberland.
Serra	Spain	The steamship was severely damaged by fire at New Orleans.
Sisters	United Kingdom	The ship foundered in Sand Bay. Her crew survived. She was on a voyage from Lydney, Gloucestershire to Weston-super-Mare, Somerset.
Star of the East	United Kingdom	The barque was driven ashore at Bassein, India. She had been refloated by 19 August.
Thalia	Germany	The full-rigged ship put into Lisbon, Portugal on fire. She was on a voyage from Hamburg to San Francisco, California, United States.
Thomas Blythe	United Kingdom	The barque sank about 500 nautical miles (930 km) off the Isles of Scilly. Her seven crew took to the ship's boat. They were rescued by a Norwegian ship. Thomas Blythe was on a voyage from Samanco, Peru to Liverpool, Lancashirel.
659	Russia	The lighter sprang a leak and sank at Kronstadt.
Unnamed fishing vessels	United Kingdom	Fifty-eight fishermen from Shetland drowned during a recent storm.
Unnamed	United Kingdom	The brig ran aground on the Scroby Sands, Norfolk. She was on a voyage from Hartlepool, County Durham to London. She was refloated and assisted into Great Yarmouth, Norfolk.
Unnamed	France	The lighter was run down and sunk in the Gironde by the steamship Dago (France) with the loss of a crew member.
Two unnamed vessels	Russia	The barges were wrecked at Poti, Russia.
