= Akaroa (disambiguation) =

Akaroa is a town in the Canterbury Region on the South Island of New Zealand.

Akaroa may also refer to:

- Akaroa (electorate)
- Akaroa (barque)
- Akaroa County
- Akaroa Harbour
- Akaroa Marine Reserve
- Akaroa, Tasmania
- Runga akaroa, a species of spider
- SS Akaroa
