= SS Huntingdon =

SS Huntingdon is the name of the following ships:

- SS Huntingdon (1881), launched 16 March 1881
- SS Huntingdon (1920), sunk by a torpedo, 24 February 1941

== See also ==
- Huntingdon (disambiguation)
