= SS Lindus =

Australian steamship

History

Victoria
- Name: SS Lindus
- Owner: T. J. Parker, London (1881-1884); Huddart, Parker & Co., Melbourne (1884-1899)
- Port of registry: Melbourne
- Builder: Edward Withy & Co., West Hartlepool, UK
- Launched: 24 October 1881
- Completed: 1881
- Identification: Registration number: 2/1882; Official number: 85085
- Fate: Wrecked, 4 June 1899

General characteristics
- Type: Iron screw steamer
- Tonnage: 1,678 GRT; 1,080 NRT
- Length: 78.45 m (257 ft 5 in)
- Beam: 10.54 m (34 ft 7 in)
- Draught: 5.425 m (17 ft 9.6 in)
- Installed power: Compound engine
- Crew: 24

SS Lindus was an Australian iron-hulled coastal cargo ship driven by a 160 H.P. 2-cylinder compound steam engine with a top cruising speed of 10 knots. She was built in 1881 by Edward Withy & Co., Hartlepool, England. Her engines were built by T. Richardson & Sons, Hartlepool. She had a complement of 24 crewmembers.

== Shipwrecked ==
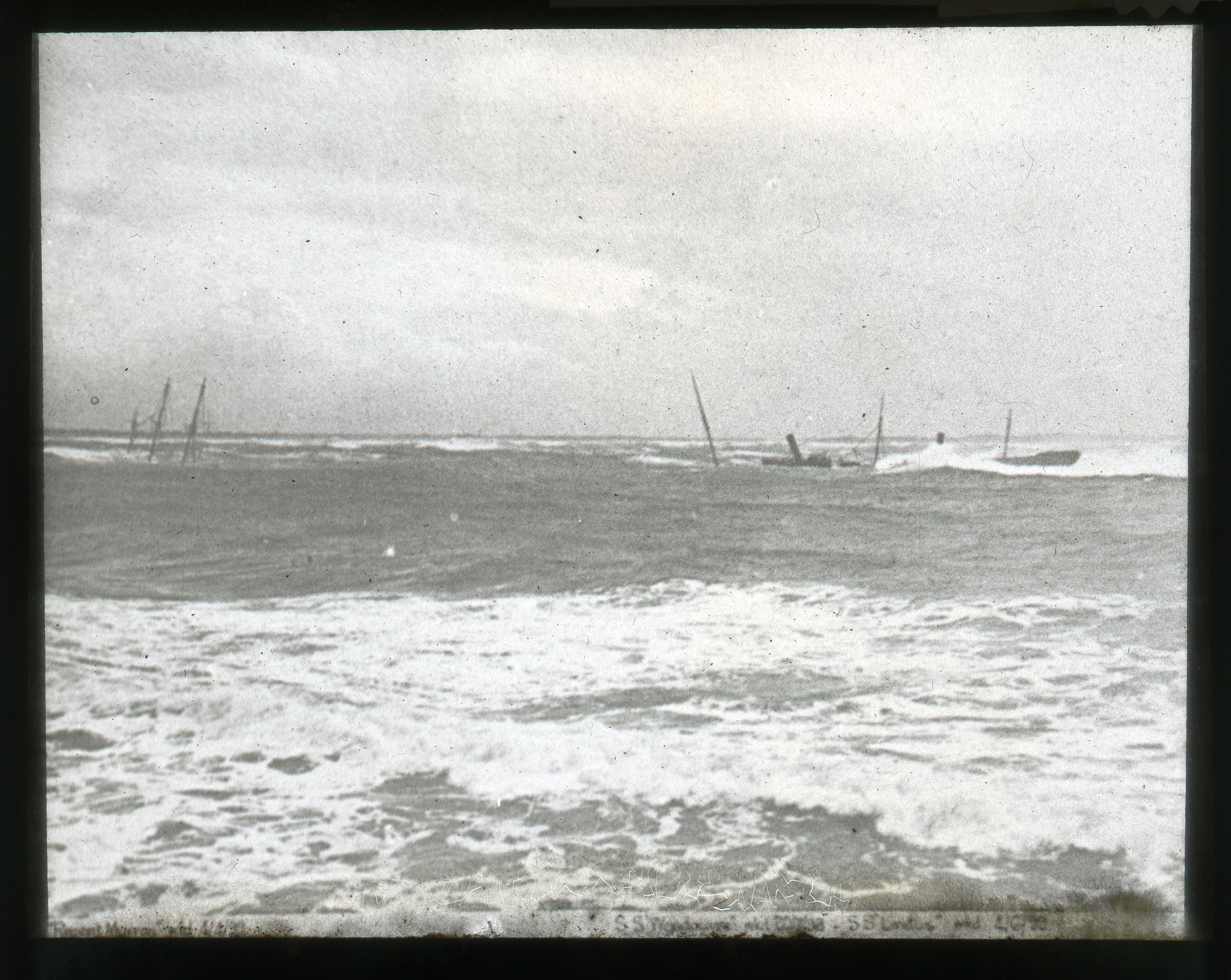
Shipwrecks Regent Murray, Wendouree and Lindus, Newcastle Harbour, New South Wales, 1899

On 4 June 1899, traveling from Newcastle, New South Wales on her way to Adelaide while carrying a cargo of coal the Lindus was caught up in a heavy storm and was wrecked near Newcastle's Oyster Bank, on the wreck of the Colonist at position 32.914°S 151.797°E.
