= USLHT Holly =

US lighthouse service ship

History

United States
- Name: USLHT Holly
- Namesake: Holly
- Operator: United States Lighthouse Service
- Builder: Malster & Reaney, Baltimore, Maryland
- Cost: $41,911; ($1,365,576 in modern dollars)
- Commissioned: 1 September 1881
- Decommissioned: 1 August 1931
- Fate: Sold, 4 December 1931

General characteristics
- Type: Lighthouse tender
- Tonnage: 367
- Length: 156 ft (48 m) (in 1881); 166.7 ft (50.8 m) (after 1898 overhaul)
- Beam: 39 ft (12 m)
- Draft: 9 ft 6 in (2.90 m)
- Installed power: 400 BHP
- Propulsion: Marine condensing beam steam engine; return flue "lobster back" coal-fired boiler; side paddle wheels
- Complement: 21

The USLHT Holly was one of two Holly-class side wheel bay and sound tenders built in 1881 for service in the Chesapeake Bay region, the other being USLHT Jessamine. Both ships in the class had composite hulls, with wood frames and iron sheathing, and were built by Malster & Reaney of Baltimore, Maryland. The original contract cost was estimated at $37,500 each. However, their actual cost upon completion was $41,911 each. The two ships replaced the lighthouse tenders Heliotrope and Tulip.

Commissioned by the United States Lighthouse Service on 1 September 1881, Holly was first assigned to the 5th Lighthouse District. She was based out of Baltimore and later Portsmouth for service as an inspection tender. She also serviced aids to navigation in the Chesapeake Bay. In April 1889, President Benjamin Harrison, his family, Secretary of State Blaine and Secretary of the Treasury Windom rode the Holly down the Potomac River and back. In April 1893, on her way down the Potomac River, she rescued Congressman Reyburn when his yacht, the Gretchen, was found burning off Marshall Hall, Maryland. Less than a week later, with Commodore Fighting Bob Evans aboard, Holly and her crew rescued 28 African Americans when their boat capsized near Old Point Comfort.

Later reconfigured as a lightvessel, she served on the Wolftrap Shoal station in 1893, the Bush Bluff station in 1894 and later saw service as a relief lightship. She was restored to her configuration as a tender, along with an overhaul and hull lengthening in 1898. After this reconfiguration, the Holly was capable of servicing lighthouses outside the Chesapeake Bay.

In 1916, she was still servicing lighthouses and other aids to navigation in the Chesapeake Bay and Pocomoke Sound, between Baltimore and Norfolk. Her principal duties was servicing buoy inspection and overhauling work and delivering fuel to isolated light stations. The June 1917 Annual Report of the Light-House Board recommended replacing Holly, as she had been worn out in service. However, in August 1917, she was towed to Baltimore for overhaul costing over $6,000. The extensive overhaul was completed by the end of October 1917, and she returned to her lighthouse service duties in the Chesapeake Bay and its tributaries.

She was laid up in 1921 due to a lack of funds but was put back into service later that decade. She was decommissioned on 1 August 1931 and was sold for $691 on 4 December of that same year. Sometime later her owners removed her engine and converted her for use as the barge Wright No. 1. She was "discarded" in 1944.
