= SS Moresby =

British cargo ship

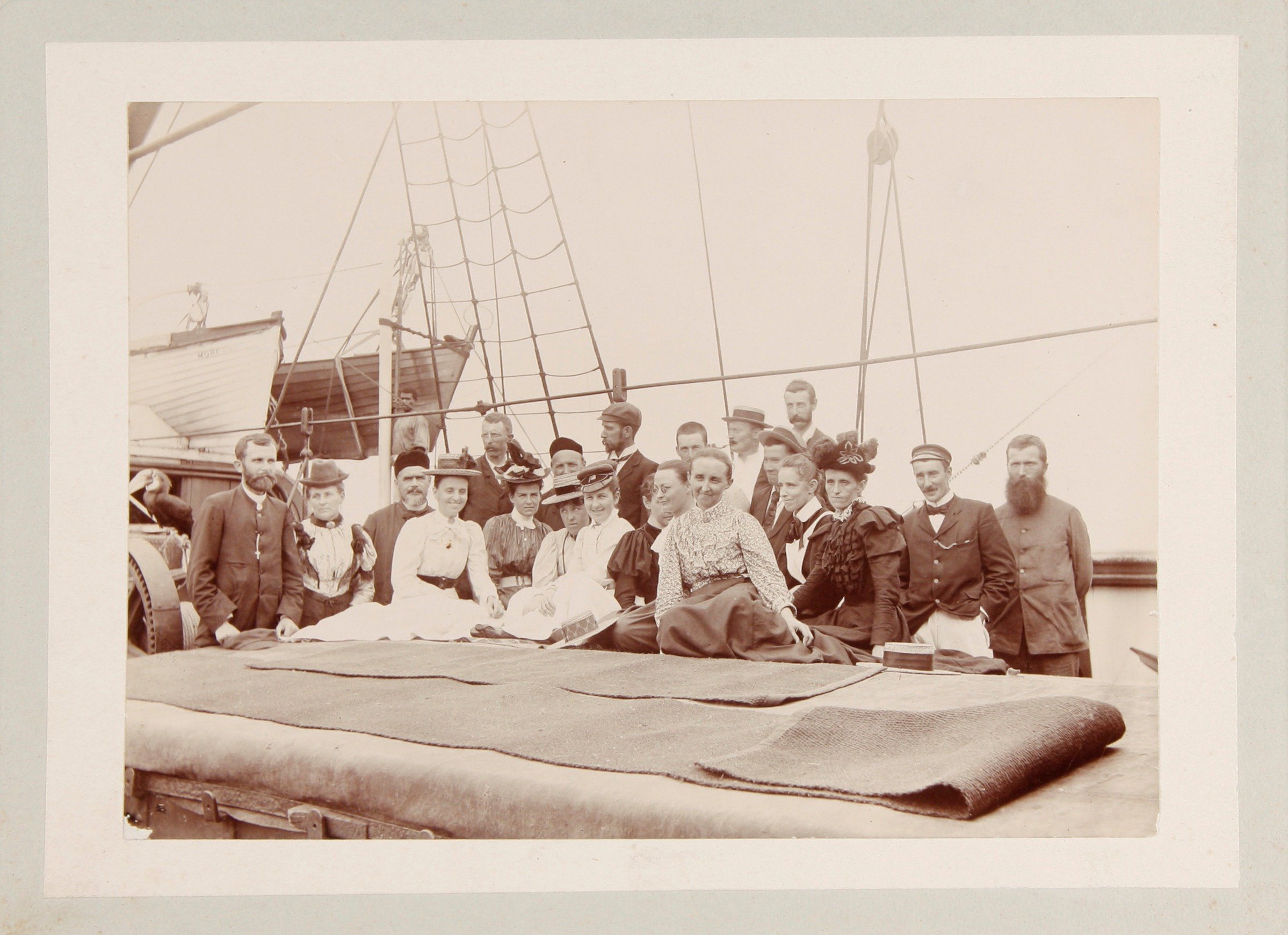
- Missionaries aboard Moresby near Normanby Island, Papua New Guinea. Picture taken by Reverend George Brown in 1899.

History
- Name: Moresby (1915–1916); Moresby (1898–1915); Jacob Christensen (1882–1898)
- Owner: Moresby SS. Co. Ltd (Moller & Co.)
- Port of registry: (United Kingdom of Great Britain and Ireland) Shanghai, China (1915–1916); (New South Wales) Sydney, Australia (1898–1915); Bergen, Norway (1882–1898)
- Builder: Raylton Dixon & Co.
- Yard number: 189
- Launched: 23 November 1881
- Completed: 1882
- Acquired: 1882
- In service: 1882
- Out of service: 28 November 1916
- Identification: Official number: 107022
- Fate: Torpedoed and sunk on 28 November 1916

General characteristics
- Type: Cargo ship
- Tonnage: 1,763 GRT
- Length: 79.5 m (260 ft 10 in)
- Beam: 10.5 m (34 ft 5 in)
- Depth: 7.3 m (23 ft 11 in)
- Installed power: 1 × 2 cyl. compound steam engine, 2 boilers with 4 furnaces
- Propulsion: One screw propeller
- Speed: 9 knots
- Crew: 45

SS Moresby was a British cargo ship that was torpedoed by the German submarine U-39 in the Mediterranean Sea, 120 nautical miles (220 km; 140 mi) northwest of Alexandria, Egypt, on 28 November 1916 while she was travelling from Saigon, Vietnam to Dunkirk, France carrying a cargo of rice.

== Construction ==
Moresby was built as Jacob Christensen in 1881 at the Raylton Dixon & Co. shipyard in Middlesbrough, United Kingdom and launched on 23 November that same year before being completed in 1882. The ship was 79.5 metres (260 ft 10 in) long, had a beam of 10.5 metres (34 ft 5 in) and had a depth of 7.3 metres (23 ft 11 in). She was assessed at 1,763 gross register tons (GRT) and had a single 2-cylinder compound steam engine driving a screw propeller as well as two boilers with four furnaces. The ship had a speed of 9 knots (17 km/h; 10 mph).

== 1910 grounding ==
On the morning of 18 February 1910, Moresby ran aground on the Barrier reef near Lizard Island, Queensland, Australia. Several attempts to free her were unsuccessful and by the next morning, the ship's commander Captain Voy ordered all passengers into the lifeboats to be safely brought to Lizard Island. Captain Voy managed to refloat the ship on the morning of 21 February 1910 and proceeded to pick up the stranded passengers on Lizard Island before continuing its journey. The ship had suffered some damage to its forehold on her port side, but was quickly repaired and returned to service.

== Sinking ==
Moresby was travelling from Saigon, Vietnam, to Dunkirk, France, while carrying a cargo of rice. Due to the threat posed at sea by German U-boats in the ongoing First World War, Moresby had been defensively armed by her owners. On 28 November 1916, while the ship was sailing in the Mediterranean Sea, 120 nautical miles (220 km; 140 mi) northwest of Alexandria, Egypt, she was torpedoed without warning by U-39. The ship quickly settled by the stern and sank in 12 minutes. Due to the rapid foundering of the ship, no lifeboats could be deployed. Of the 45 crew on board, 33 perished, including the chief officer and his wife, the chief engineer and 29 Chinese crewmembers. Among the 12 survivors were the ship's captain, second officer and seven Chinese crewmembers.

== Wreck ==
The wreck of Moresby is believed to lay at 32°36′N 28°38′E.
