= Cartsdyke =

Suburb of the town of Greenock, Scotland

Coordinates: 55.942°N 4.741°W

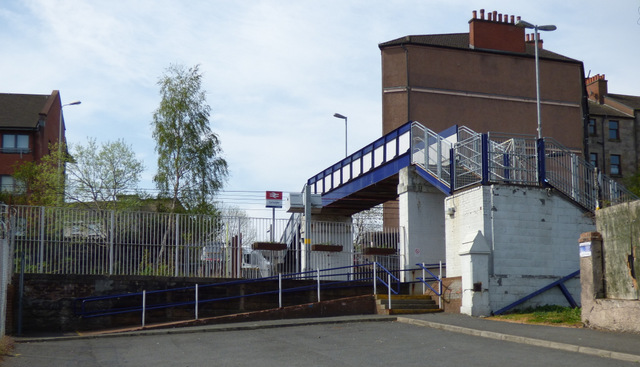
Cartsdyke station

Cartsdyke (Scots: Cairstdyke, Scottish Gaelic: Gàradh Cairte), formerly known as Crawfurdsdyke, is a suburb of the town of Greenock, Scotland.

Crawfurdsdyke is an historic Burgh of Barony, historically being part of the Barony of Cartsburn. The estate of Cartsburn, also known as Crawfurdsburn, incorporated the lands of Cartsdyke and part of the lands of Easter Greenock Castle. The Barony of Cartsburn is a feudal Barony of Scotland. The seat of the Barony was the House of Cartsburn, built in the 17th century near Greenock, Renfrewshire. While the ancient Burgh was subsumed into Greenock in 1840.

It is served by Cartsdyke railway station.
