= SS John B. Lyon =

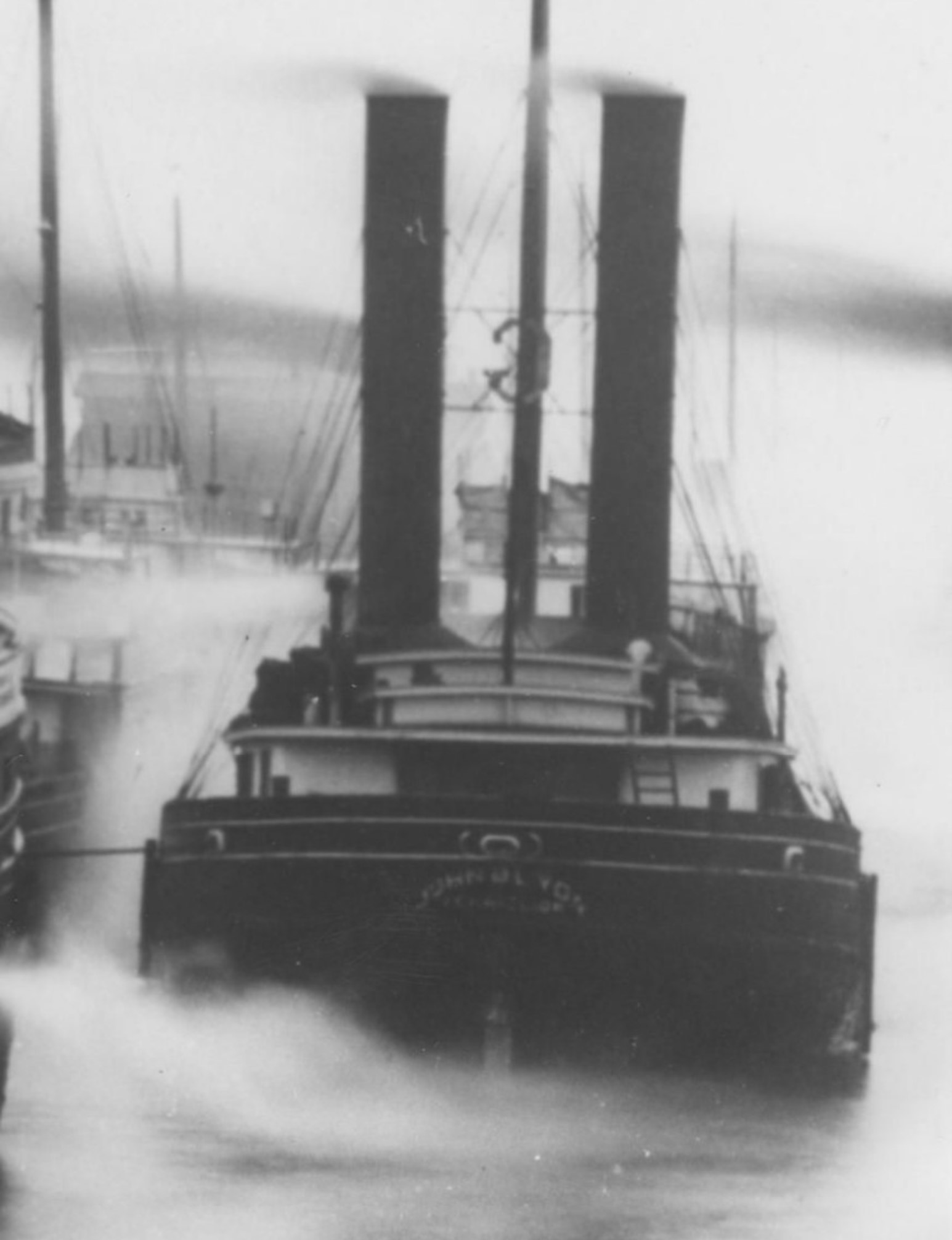
- c. 1890

History

United States
- Name: SS John B. Lyon
- Builder: Thomas Quayle & Sons
- Christened: 1881
- Out of service: 12 September 1900

General characteristics
- Type: steamer
- Tonnage: 1710 grt
- Installed power: 700 h.p. (rhp)
- Crew: 16

SS John B. Lyon was an 1881 built American wooden bulk carrier steamer.

== History ==
On 12 September 1900, during the Great Storm of 1900 the steamer with a cargo of 80,000 iron ore was sunk in a gale, the remnants of the hurricane that hit Galveston, Texas, on Lake Erie off Conneaut near Ashtabula, Ohio, a total loss. Nine crewmen were killed, seven people survived.
