= Akaroa (barque) =

Coordinates: 49°21′N 4°25′W

- Akaroa.

History
- Name: Akaroa
- Owner: Engelhart C. H. (Trefil A/S D/S)
- Port of registry: Sunderland, United Kingdom
- Builder: Osbourne, Graham & Co. Ltd.
- Yard number: 53
- Launched: 25 October 1881
- Completed: October 1881
- Identification: 82424
- Fate: Torpedoed and sunk 1 September 1917

General characteristics
- Type: Barque
- Tonnage: 1,347 GRT
- Length: 67.4 metres (221 ft 2 in)
- Beam: 11.1 metres (36 ft 5 in)
- Depth: 6.92 metres (22 ft 8 in)
- Installed power: 3 Masts
- Propulsion: Sailing Ship

Akaroa was a Norwegian sailing ship that was torpedoed by the German submarine SM U-19 in the English Channel, 70 miles west off the Casquets, Guernsey while she was travelling from Philadelphia, United States to Rouen, France with a cargo of oil.

== Construction ==
Akaroa was constructed in 1881 with yard no. 53 at the Osbourne, Graham & Co. Ltd. shipyard in Sunderland, United Kingdom. She was completed in October 1881.

The ship was 67.4 metres (221 ft 2 in) long, with a beam of 11.1 metres (36 ft 5 in). She had a depth of 6.92 metres (22 ft 8 in). The ship was assessed at 1,347 GRT. She had 3 masts and sailed the seas for almost 36 years.

== Sinking ==
On 1 September 1917, Akaroa was on a voyage from Philadelphia, United States, to Rouen, France. When she was suddenly struck by the torpedoes from the German submarine SM U-19 70 miles west of the Casquets, Guernsey. While passing underneath the sinking Akaroa, the submarine damaged its periscope. The crew all made it safely to the ship's two lifeboats and sailed and rowed to the French coast which they eventually reached 36 hours later. At the time of her sinking Akaroa was carrying a cargo of oil.

The ship sank to a depth of over 85 metres (279 ft), along with her cargo. There were no casualties reported.
