= Lisette (German schooner) =

German schooner (1881)

History

German Empire
- Name: Lisette
- Owner: Johan Georg Oestman
- Completed: 1881
- Maiden voyage: August 1881

General characteristics
- Tonnage: 390 BRT
- Length: 50 m (164 ft 1 in)
- Sail plan: three masts

Lisette was an 1881-built, 50-metre (164 ft 1 in) long German three-masted iron schooner. It was owned by Johan Georg Oestman and had hometown Blankenese.

In August 1881 the full-rigged ship was driven ashore and wrecked on Terschelling, the Netherlands. The crew members were rescued.

== Ship details ==
Lisette was built in 1881 and was a German three masted iron schooner. She was named after the wife of captain Hans August Oestman. The ship was 50 metres (164 ft 1 in) long and had a width of 10 m (32 ft 10 in) and was used as a cargo vessel. She weighed 390 BRT.

== Fate ==
During her maiden voyage with captain Hans August Oestman and Johann Georg Oltmann the ship was on voyage from Hamburg, Germany to Arica, Chile with general cargo on board, including glassware, rice beer bottles and boxes of ironmongery. During the night of 14–15 August 1881 the full-rigged ship was driven ashore and wrecked at Terschelling, the Netherlands. The crew of the ship was rescued by fishermen from Terschelling.

From 2 October 1881, the ship was completely covered in sand.

== Cargo ==
Rigging, inventory and part of the cargo of the ship was salvaged in the days after the ship stranded by salvagers from Terschelling in the days after the ship stranded. Some of the cargo was damaged. Water came on board the ship. The tug Hercules went to the ship in the night of 17 August to pump water out of the ship with its centrifugal pump. Multiple salvagers, also from elsewhere, continued to unload cargo from the ship. Sometimes it was very busy with salvagers around the ship. The cargo like rice was dried as best as possible. The ship broke up on 19 August and lay on its side. The ship's masts have been laid on the beach. By 21 August, most of the warehouses became full. Cargo could still be recovered as of 23 August.

Pieces of the ship also washed up on Ameland, including 73 boxes of candles, 8 boxes of beer and two boxes of paper.

In a public sales the salvaged cargo was auctioned, of general cargo: draperies, woolen fabrics, pocket linen, lard, wax candles, wine, beer, distilled spirits and other merchant goods. Much of the sold cargo was damaged. Also inventory of the ship was sold. Rice was sold from 22 August. From 7 September a daily auction was held in the morning of the general cargo and inventory. A catalogus could be bought for 0.25 Guilder. On 15 September 1881 the wreck itself was sold. The goods had a total revenue of 39,410.95 Guilder, the wreck was sold for 82 Guilder.

Before the sales there was a dispute about the deposit fee for the goods. The salvage companies wanted 20 percent while the insurance company offered 17 percent. There were fairs of a lawsuit. As of 19 September, after the sales, there was almost an agreement with the salvagers wanting 24 percent and the insurance company offering 23 percent.

The so-called 'Lisette glasses', little glasses with engraved stars that was part of the cargo, were widely used at Terschelling for many years.

== Wreck dives ==
Around 1990, after shrimp fisherman Alfred van Nouhuys found something, diving was conducted for a wreck that had recently emerged from the sand. It turned out to be the Lisette of which the prow was easily recognizable by the enormous bowsprit that ran into the sand. In the wreck there were many boxes with iron bars, and to the ship was called the 'box wreck'. Afterwards the ship was completely silted up again.

In 2000 it was resurfaced but the wreck was almost completely covered in sand. Many crates with beer bottles with marks of "AB-Norway" were found and also bottles of wheat beer from a German brewery. In 2001, a large part of the foredeck was salvaged. This is nowadays part of the tree house in the garden of the wreck museum, named Wrakkenmuseum, in Terschelling.
