= List of lighthouses in Virginia =

This is a list of all lighthouses in the U.S. state of Virginia as identified by the United States Coast Guard. There are nine active lights in the state as well as three automated caissons and eleven skeleton towers replacing previously staffed lights.

The first lighthouse in the state was erected in 1792 (the first Cape Henry Light) and it is the oldest surviving structure; the last, Chesapeake Light, was built in 1965 (ignoring automated towers erected later). The tallest extant tower is that at Cape Charles Light.

If not otherwise noted, focal height and coordinates are taken from the United States Coast Guard Light List, while location and dates of activation, automation, and deactivation are taken from the United States Coast Guard Historical information site for lighthouses. Locations of demolished lights have been estimated using National Oceanic and Atmospheric Administration (NOAA) navigational charts.

Name	Image	Location	Coordinates	Year first lit	Automated	Year deactivated	Current Lens	Focal Height
Assateague Light		Assateague Island	37.9111°N 75.3558°W	1833 (First); 1867 (Current)	1933	Active	DCB-24	154 ft (47 m)
Back River Light		Hampton	37.0872°N 76.2698°W	1829	1915	1936 (Destroyed in 1956)	None	Unknown
Bells Rock Light		York River	37.4839°N 76.7498°W	1881	Never	1928 (Dismantled)	None	40 ft (12 m)
Bowlers Rock Light		Rappahannock River	37.8245°N 76.7327°W	1868	Never	1920 (Removed)	None	Unknown
Cape Charles Light		Cape Charles	37.1229°N 75.9063°W	1828 (First); 1895 (Current)	1963	Active	190mm	180 ft (55 m)
Cape Henry Light (Old)		Virginia Beach (Cape Henry)	36.9257°N 76.0081°W	1792	Never	1881	None	Unknown
Cape Henry Light (New)		Virginia Beach (Cape Henry)	36.9264°N 76.0072°W	1881	1984	Active	Unknown	157 ft (48 m)
Cherrystone Bar Light		Cape Charles (Offshore)	37.2564°N 76.0324°W	1858	Never	1919 (Moved in 1920)	None	Unknown
Chesapeake Light		Chesapeake Bay (Entrance)	36°54′17″N 75°42′46″W	1965	1980	2016	None	117 ft (36 m)
Craney Island Light		Elizabeth River (Mouth)	36.892°N 76.337°W	1859 (First); 1884 (Last)	Never	1936 (Removed)	None	36 ft (11 m)
Deepwater Shoals Light		Newport News (Offshore)	37°8′11.46″N 76°38′12.48″W	1855 (First); 1868 (Last)	Never	1936 (Demolished)	None	34 ft (10 m)
Dutch Gap Canal Lights		James River	37°22′35″N 77°21′34″W	1875	Never	1910	None	27 ft (8.2 m)
Great Wicomico River Light		Great Wicomico River (Mouth)	37.8042°N 76.2675°W	1889	Never	1967 (Dismantled)	None	42 ft (13 m)
Hog Island Light (First tower)		Exmore	37.394°N 75.701°W	1853	Never	1896 (Replaced)	None	Unknown
Hog Island Light (Second tower)		Exmore	37.394°N 75.701°W	1896	Never	1948 (Demolished)	None	Unknown
Jones Point Light		Alexandria	38°47′25.4″N 77°02′26.3″W	1856	1919	Active (Inactive: 1926–1995)	Unknown	35 ft (11 m)
Jordan Point Front Range Light	None Known	James River	N/A	Unknown	Unknown	Unknown	None	Unknown
Jordan Point Range Rear Light		James River	37.313°N 77.223°W	1855 (First); 1941 (Current)	1941	Active	Unknown	35 ft (11 m) (Second tower); 65 ft (20 m) (Current tower)
Killock Shoal Light		Chincoteague (Offshore)	37.934°N 75.380°W	1886	1929	1939 (Dismantled)	None	Unknown
Lambert Point Light		Norfolk	36.875°N 76.331°W	1872	Never	1892 (Collapsed in 1911)	None	Unknown
Nansemond River Light		Nansemond River (Mouth)	36.912°N 76.445°W	1878	Never	1935 (Dismantled)	None	Unknown
New Point Comfort Light		Chesapeake Bay	36.912°N 76.445°W	1805	1930	Active (Inactive: 1963–1999)	250mm	58 ft (18 m)
Newport News Middle Ground Light		Newport News	36.9452°N 76.3915°W	1891	1954	Active	VRB-25	52 ft (16 m)
Old Plantation Flats Light		Cape Charles (Offshore)	37.2288°N 76.0469°W	1886	Never	1962 (Demolished)	None	35 ft (11 m)
Old Point Comfort Light		Hampton	37.0018°N 76.3064°W	1804	1972	Active	Fourth-order Fresnel	54 ft (16 m)
Pages Rock Light		York River	37.3109°N 76.5866°W	1893	1960	1967 (Dismantled)	None	Unknown
Point of Shoals Light		James River	37.0683°N 76.6530°W	1855 (First); 1871 (Last)	1932	1933 (Demolished)	None	Unknown
Pungoteague Creek Light		Chesapeake Bay	37.6630°N 75.8980°W	1854	Never	1856 (Destroyed)	None	Unknown
Smith Point Light		Potomac River (Mouth)	37.8800°N 76.1839°W	1802 (First); 1897 (Current)	1971	Active	DCB-24	52 ft (16 m)
Stingray Point Light		Rappahannock River (Mouth)	37.5613°N 76.2700°W	1858	1950	1965 (Dismantled)	None	34 ft (10 m)
Tangier Sound Light		Tangier (Offshore)	37.7878°N 75.9740°W	1890	Never	1961 (Demolished)	None	Unknown
Thimble Shoal Light		Chesapeake Bay	37.0146°N 76.2399°W	1872 (First); 1914 (Current)	1964	Active	RB-355	55 ft (17 m)
Tue Marshes Light		York River (Mouth)	37.2356°N 76.3859°W	1875	Never	1960 (Dismantled)	None	Unknown
Watts Island Light		Chesapeake Bay	37.782°N 75.894°W	1833	1923	1944 (Destroyed)	None	Unknown
White Shoal Light		James River	37.0218°N 76.5275°W	1855 (First); 1871 (Last)	Never	1934 (Destroyed in the 1970s)	None	Unknown
Windmill Point Light		Rappahannock River (Mouth)	37.5968°N 76.2359°W	1869	1954	1965 (Dismantled)	None	Unknown
Wolf Trap Light		Chesapeake Bay	37.5968°N 76.2359°W	1870 (First); 1894 (Current)	1971	2017 (Abandoned)	VRB-25	Unknown
York Spit Light		York River (Mouth)	37.2096°N 76.2542°W	1870	Never	1960 (Dismantled)	None	Unknown
