= Fannie Salter =

American lighthouse keeper (1882–1966)

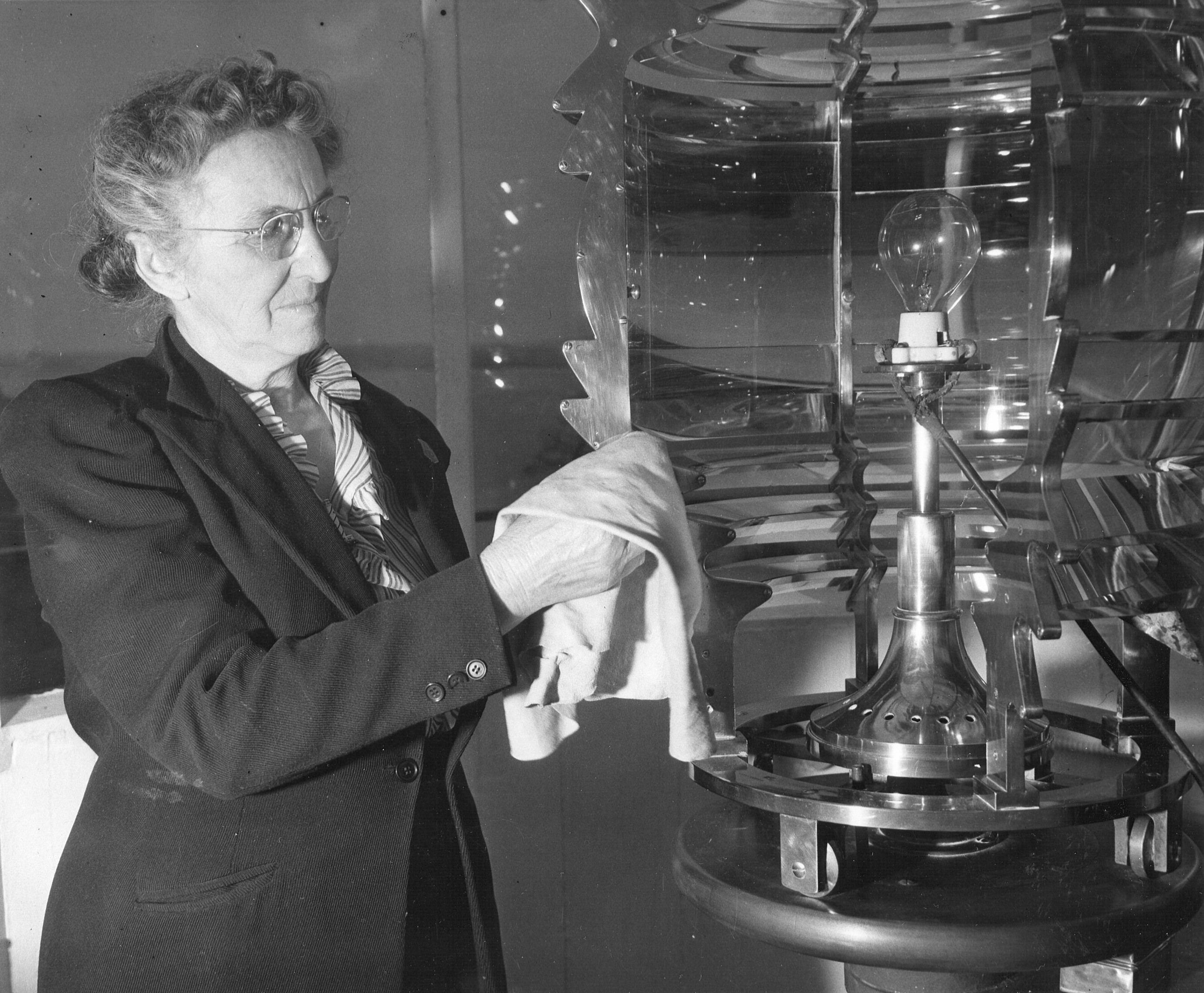
- Salter polishes the Fresnel lens at Turkey Point Light, 1945
- Born: Francis May Hudgins; May 20, 1882; New Point, Virginia, U.S.
- Died: March 11, 1966 (aged 83); Baltimore, Maryland, U.S.
- Burial place: Friendship Cemetery, Mathews County, Virginia
- Occupation: Lighthouse keeper
- Years active: 1925–1947
- Employer: United States Coast Guard (civilian)
- Spouse: C. W. Salter (m. 1904; died 1925)
- Children: 3

Fannie May Hudgins Salter (May 20, 1882 – March 11, 1966) was an American lighthouse keeper and the last lighthouse keeper at Turkey Point Light in Maryland. She served from 1925 until she retired in 1947, at which point the station became fully automated. From 1922 to 1925, she worked at the lighthouse along with her husband, fully taking over the duties after his death.

For a time, Salter was the only female employed by the United States Coast Guard and was the last civilian female lighthouse keeper in the U.S. She was one of four female lighthouse keepers who served at Turkey Point between 1844 and 1947, covering 86 of its 114 years of service.

== Early life ==
Born Frances May Hudgins to Isaac Hudgins and Indiana Jarvis on May 20, 1882, she married Clarence Winfield Salter, also from Mathews County, Virginia, on May 24, 1904. They had four children together: Mabel, Jessie Olga, and Charles.

For a brief time during the 1920s, she and her husband lived in Franktown, Virginia, where their son was born.

== Career ==
Fannie assisted her husband in maintaining and servicing several lighthouses in the Chesapeake Bay area: York Spit Light (1904–1908), Old Plantation Flats Light (1908–1912), Cherrystone Bar Light (1912–1913), Hog Island Light (1915–1922), and Turkey Point Light (1922–1947). All of the lighthouses the family was stationed at prior to 1922 were in Virginia.

=== Turkey Point Light Station ===
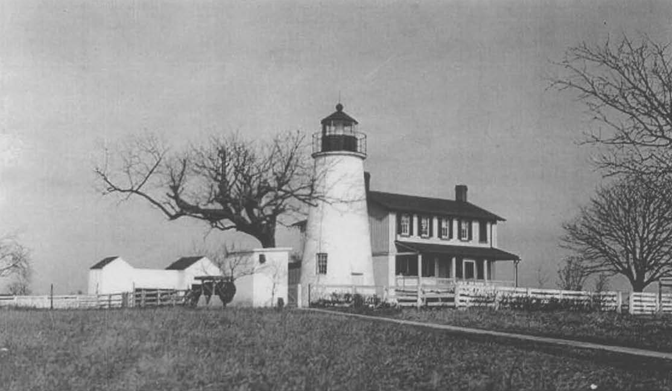
Turkey Point Light Station and keeper's house, 1924

Beginning in 1922, C. W. Salter served as the station keeper of Turkey Point Light, with Fannie once again assisting him with the day-to-day tasks. C. W. died suddenly on February 11, 1925, following an acute attack of appendicitis. Upon his death, Fannie fully took over her husband's duties at the age of 43 and officially applied for his position shortly after. It was customary at the time for the family of the keeper to continue operating the station. The Salters had been preceded by three female keepers: Elizabeth Lusby 1862, and Rebecca Crouch 1895, who both took over following their husbands' deaths and served until their own deaths; Rebecca Crouch's daughter, Georgiana Brumfield, wanting to follow in her footsteps, took over the duties from 1895 to 1919, retiring after spending 54 years on the homestead.

Despite over 20 years of assisting with day-to-day operations of a lighthouse, she was initially denied the role by the Civil Service, who cited her age as preventing her from being able to perform the necessary tasks. Salter petitioned Senator Ovington Weller to appeal the decision. Weller then asked President Calvin Coolidge, who overruled the Civil Service's decision and personally appointed her as official keeper at Turkey Point. Though U.S. presidents had appointed keepers in the past, Salter was the first female keeper with a presidential appointment to that point or since.

==== United States Lighthouse Service ====
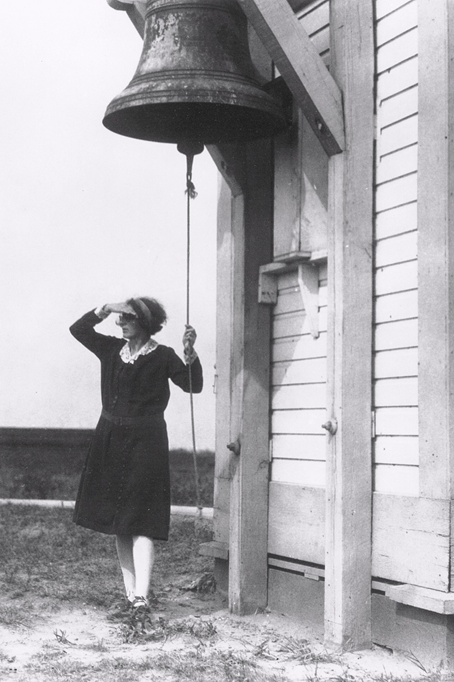
Fannie Salter at the Turkey Point fog bell, c. 1926

After her official appointment, Salter was issued a manual and learned how to use a radiotelephone. She was on duty 24 hours a day, 7 days a week, and received a salary of $1,140 her first year in service, equivalent to $20,929 in 2025. Prior to being retrofit for electricity, three brass oil lamps were cleaned and filled daily. At dusk, Fannie would fill one of the lamps with fuel, climb the 35-foot (11 m) tower, trim and light the wick, and place the lamp within the lens. She would recheck it about one hour later, and again at 10 pm before going to bed. Her bedroom in the keeper's quarters faced the tower, so she could ensure the light was functioning properly. If the light extinguished in the middle of the night, she would immediately wake up and have it reignited or replaced by one of the emergency lamps kept onsite.

In 1928, the United States Lighthouse Service (USLHS) authorized $25 per month (equivalent to $469 in 2025) for a laborer to go to the station and manually wind the fog bell striking mechanism. This charge was reduced to $15 per month in 1932 (equivalent to $354 in 2025). Once, during a particularly foggy day, the fog bell mechanism failed, and Salter had to manually strike the fog bell four times per minute for nearly an hour to help a steamer safely navigate the Chesapeake and Delaware Canal. During this time, she missed the phone call from her son-in-law announcing the birth of her first granddaughter.

==== United States Coast Guard ====
The U.S. Coast Guard absorbed the USLHS in July 1939, making all keepers, including Salter—the only woman employed by the USLHS at the time—civilian members of the Coast Guard. During World War II, the Coast Guard had shortwave radio systems installed in a number of lighthouses on the east coast to listen for U-boat activity. Salter learned to maintain radio watch in addition to her other duties. They also had existing lighthouses electrified in place of the oil or kerosene used in the past, with Turkey Point being upgraded in 1943. This upgrade meant that Salter could just flip a switch to power a 100-watt bulb that, in combination with the lens, could produce 680 candlepower of light, though a kerosene backup was maintained at all times in the event of a power outage. Still, there was work to be done, as each lens needed to be cleaned daily and polished at least once per week to be able to maintain the 13-mile (21 km) visual clearance needed for vessels to safely navigate the area.

== Additional duties ==
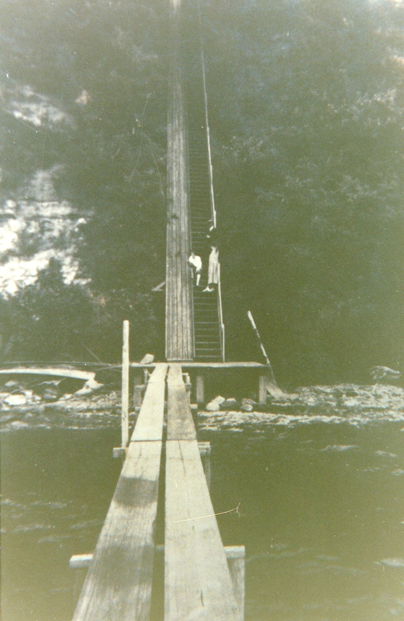
Stairs and lift ramp running from the Elk River floating dock up to the station

According to Turkey Point Light historian Mike Duvall, Turkey Point was an isolated station. The nearest city that could supply the station at the time was Havre de Grace, Maryland, 8 miles (13 km) across the Chesapeake; the nearest town that could be reached without a boat was North East, Maryland, 12 miles (19 km) from the station.

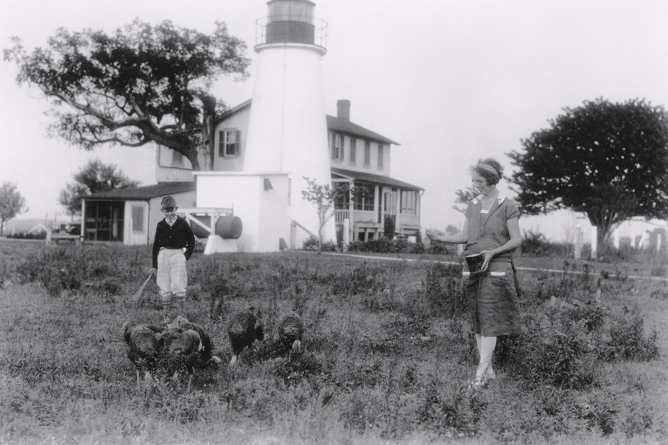
Fannie and son, Charles, tending to turkeys on the property

In the years before highways and mass automotive transit, this meant that, along with her duties as keeper, Fannie and her entire family would need to provide for themselves much of the time. Adjacent to the living quarters was a farm where the Salters tended to a garden, as well as several kinds of livestock, including sheep, cows, and turkeys.

When supplies were received, they most often came by boat. A steep, 137-step stairway led down the 100-foot (30 m) bluff to the Elk River floating dock. A chute with a windlass was installed next to the stairway; the winch would need to be manually operated, but it allowed for heavy supply crates to be hauled up to the station.

== Retirement and later years ==
Salter retired on October 1, 1947, at age 65, after 22 years of service. Her ending salary was $2,229 per year, equivalent to $32,139 in 2025. During an interview around the time of her retirement, she stated, "Oh, it was an easy-like chore, but my feet got tired, and climbing the tower has given me fallen arches." Shortly after her retirement, the light was fixed on automatic control, eliminating the need for a keeper and making Fannie Salter the last civilian female lighthouse keeper in the United States.

She had her retirement home built only 6 mi (10 km) from the tower where she had spent so many years, commenting that, at night, she could still see the beam from her new home.

Fannie May Salter died of natural causes on March 11, 1966, in Baltimore, Maryland. She and her husband are buried side-by-side in St. Paul's Methodist Church Cemetery, in Susan, Virginia.
