= White Shoal Light =

White Shoal Light can refer to a lighthouse in the United States:

- White Shoal Light, Michigan west of Mackinaw City
- White Shoal Light, Virginia in the James River near Newport News
