= New Point =

New Point may refer to the following places in the United States:

- New Point, Indiana, a town
- New Point, Missouri, an unincorporated community
- New Point, Virginia, an unincorporated community
