= Bells Rock Light =

Lighthouse in Virginia, United States

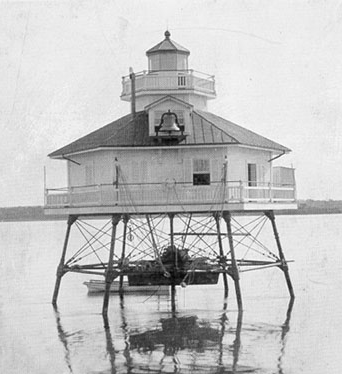
- Undated photograph of Bells Rock Light (USCG)
- Location: Two miles downstream from West Point, Virginia on the York River
- Coordinates: 37.4839°N 76.7498°W

Tower
- Constructed: 1881
- Foundation: screw-pile
- Construction: cast-iron/wood
- Automated: 1928
- Height: 40 feet (12 m)
- Shape: hexagonal house

Light
- First lit: 1881
- Deactivated: 1928
- Focal height: 12 m (39 ft)
- Lens: fourth-order Fresnel lens
- Range: 4.3 nautical miles; 8.0 kilometres (5 mi)
- Characteristic: Flashing 4 sec

The Bells Rock Light was a lighthouse located in the York River in Virginia.

== History ==
In the nineteenth century, West Point, Virginia was the head of navigation on the York River, and this light was requested in order to facilitate navigation there. A house was built for it at Lazaretto Point in 1880, but this was diverted to Thimble Shoal Light when the latter burned down. A second house was constructed and installed on this spot in 1881. Three years later it was struck by a schooner, breaking three of the support columns; these were repaired expeditiously, however, and the light passed the rest of its days uneventfully.

The diminishing of commercial traffic on the river made the light less important, and in 1928 the house was removed and a skeleton tower erected on the iron foundation. This arrangement continues to the present.
