= Tangier Island Airport =

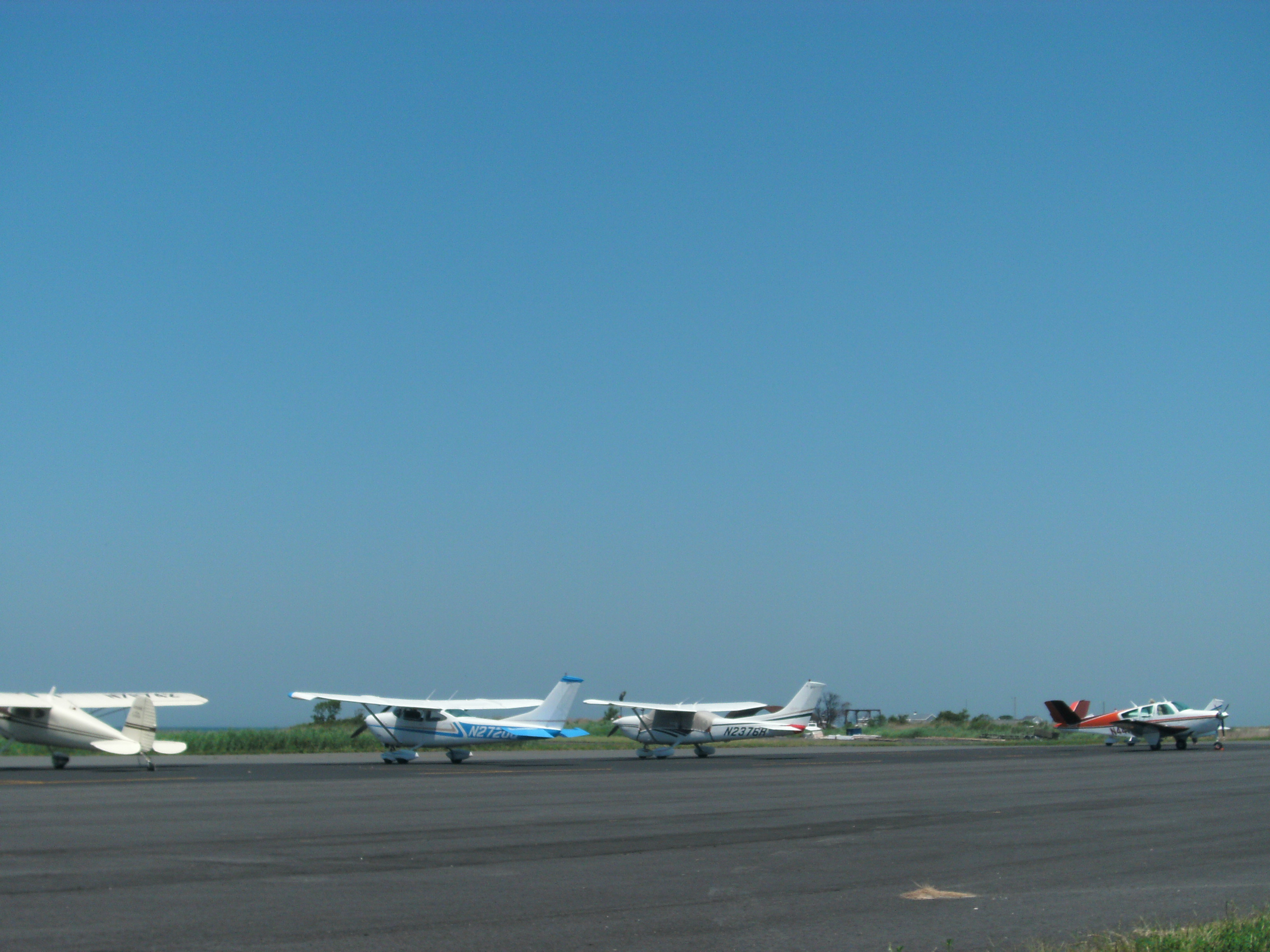
- Planes at the airport
- IATA: none; ICAO: KTGI; LID: TGI

Summary
- Owner: Town of Tangier
- Serves: Tangier Island
- Elevation AMSL: 5 ft (1.5 m)
- Interactive map of Tangier Island Airport

Runways
Direction	Length		Surface
Direction	ft	m	Surface
2/20	2,426	739	asphalt

Helipads
Number	Length		Surface
Number	ft	m	Surface
			... etc.

Statistics
- ... etc.

Tangier Island Airport (ICAO: KTGI) is an airport located on Tangier Island in the lower Chesapeake Bay. It is located in the state of Virginia. The airport conducts an average of 83 movements a month.

== History ==
According to local legend, Tangier Island was purchased with two overcoats from Native Americans in 1666. In 1969 land was dedicated for a runway. A medical clinic on the island is named after Dr. David Nichols who flew in to perform medical care from 1979 to 2010.
