= Dutch Gap Canal Lights =

Lighthouses in Virginia, United States

- Location: James River, Virginia
- Coordinates: 37°22′35.7″N 77°21′34.3″W (Light 151)

Tower
- Constructed: 1875 (first structures)
- Construction: Wood frame
- Height: 27 feet (8.2 m)
- Fog signal: none

Light
- First lit: 1878 (replaced with posts)
- Deactivated: 1910
- Lens: Small oil lanterns
- Characteristic: Fixed

The Dutch Gap Canal Lights were built to mark the ends of Dutch Gap Canal, now called Dutch Gap Cutoff, which is a 3/4 nautical mile (1.4 km; 0.86 mi) cut across the base of an oxbow in the James River between Hopewell and Richmond, Virginia. They were on Farrar's Island, on the south side of the river.

The first two structures were small wood frame towers similar in design to the Jordan Point Light, together with a keeper's house, which were built in 1875. The second tower washed away in December 1878; the first had been lost earlier. Both were replaced by lights on posts. The keeper's house was threatened by erosion of the cliff and was moved inland in 1890.

In 1910 the lights were replaced by fixed lights. Their function survives, in modern form, as lights on skeleton towers, both with the characteristic Quick Flashing Green, numbers "151" and "155", Light List numbers 2-12705 and 2-12735. The coordinates shown are for light 151 which is actually in the river. The original light was on the bank to the south.
