= Tangier Combined School =

Public school in Virginia, United States

Coordinates: 37°49′38.5″N 75°59′37.5″W

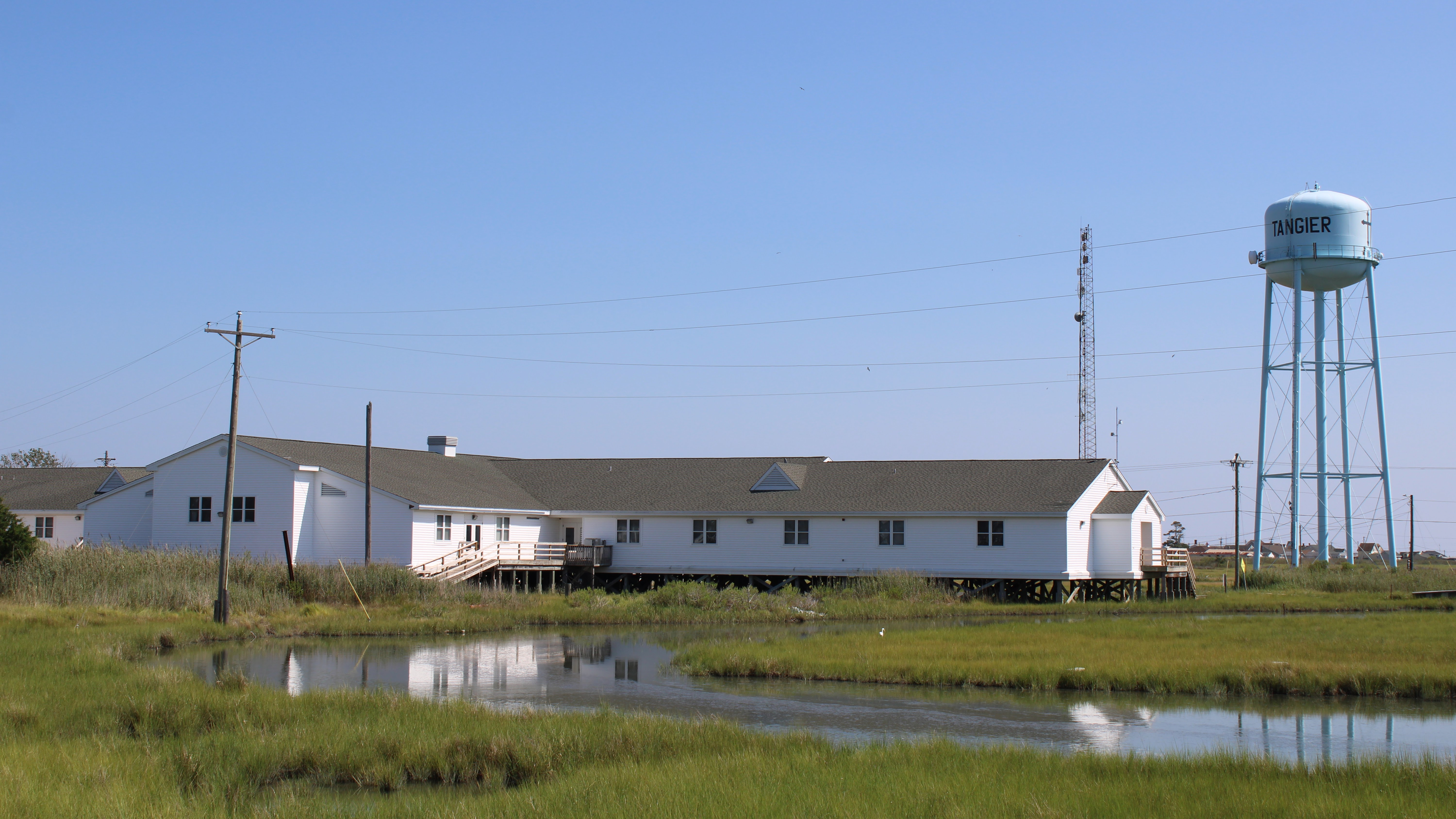

Information
- Grades: K-12
- Enrollment: 60 (2018)
- Website: www.tcs.accomack.k12.va.us

Tangier Combined School is a K-12 public school in Tangier, Virginia. A part of Accomack County Public Schools, it is the sole comprehensive K-12 public school in the State of Virginia.

The current campus opened circa 1998. The previous campus was across the street.

In 1999 it had about 120 students. As of 2018 it had 60 students.

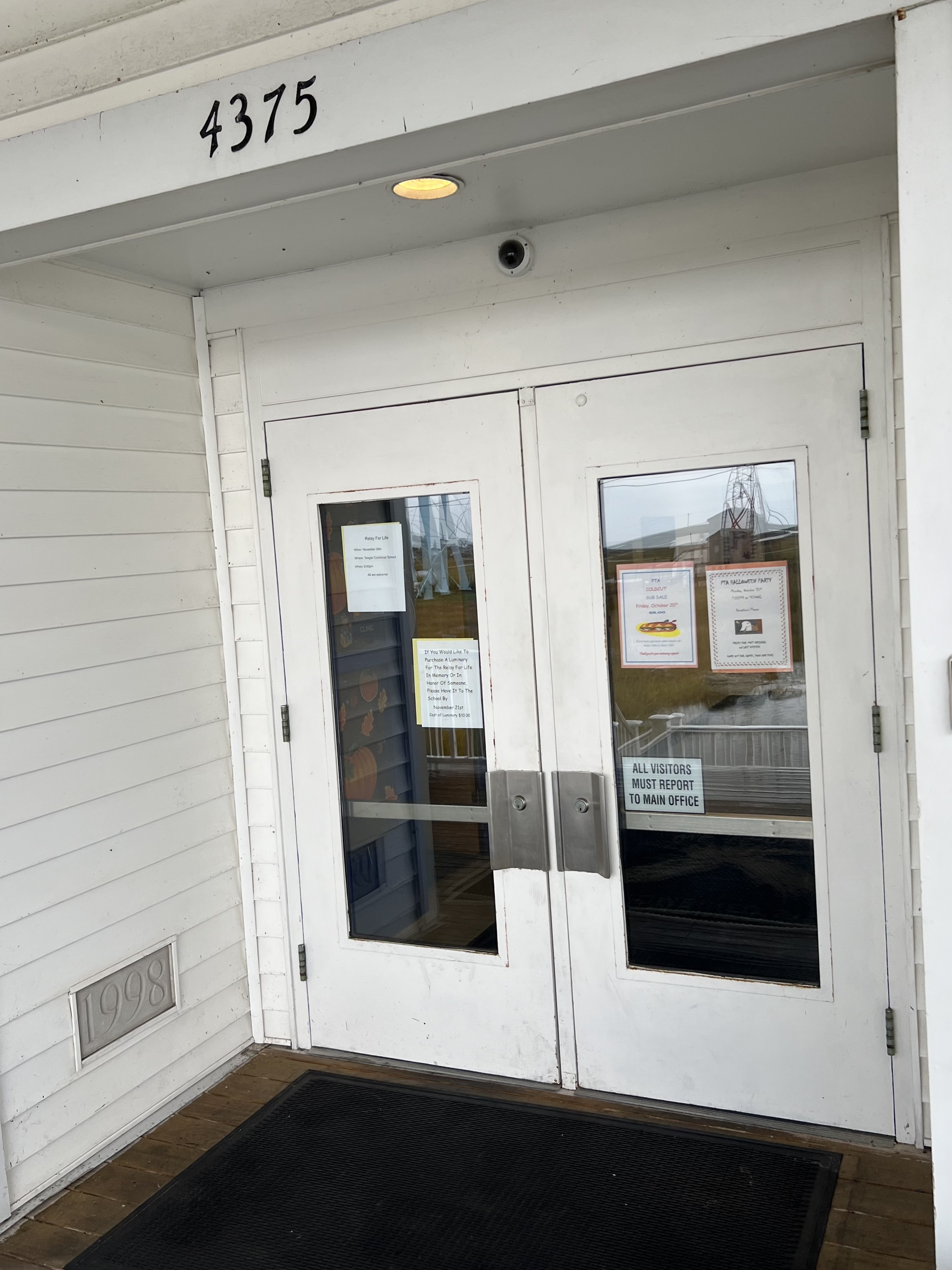
The front door of the K-12 comprehensive school on Tangier Island, Virginia.

The majority of students go to school on foot or by bicycle, golf cart, or scooter; the island is not accessible by car.
