= Fleeton, Virginia =

Unincorporated community in Virginia, US

Coordinates: 37°48′54″N 76°16′52″W

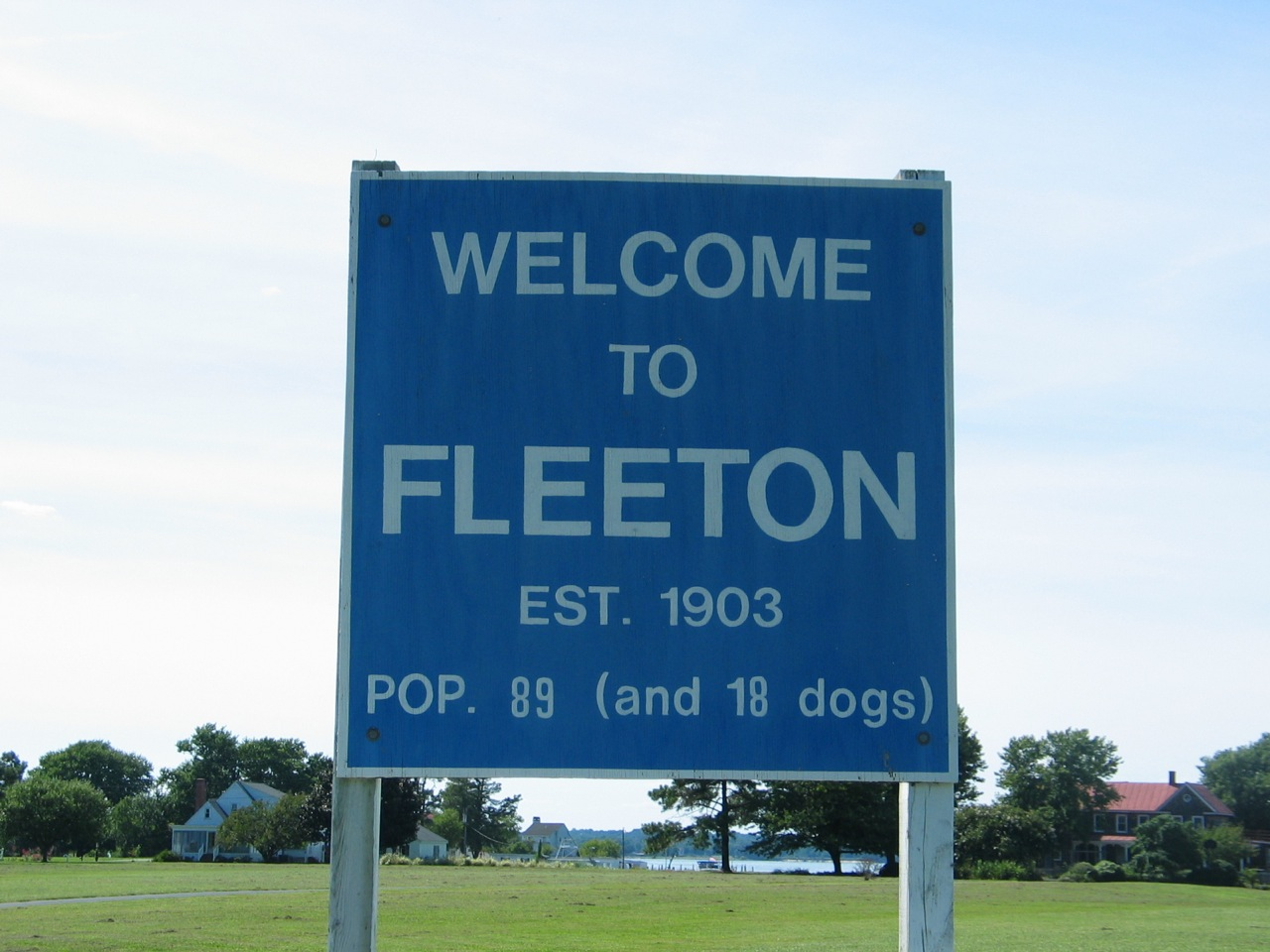
Fleeton welcome sign

Fleeton is an unincorporated community in Northumberland County, in the U.S. state of Virginia. It is located at the mouth of the Great Wicomico River.
