= White Shoal Light (Virginia) =

Lighthouse in Virginia, United States

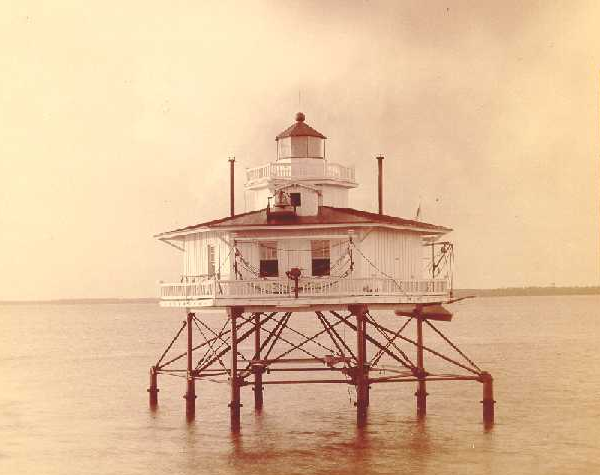
- 1885 photograph of White Shoal Light (USCG)
- Location: James River, northwest of Newport News, Virginia
- Coordinates: 37.0218°N 76.5275°W

Tower
- Foundation: screw-pile
- Construction: cast-iron/wood
- Shape: hexagonal house

Light
- First lit: 1855
- Deactivated: 1935
- Lens: fifth-order Fresnel lens

The White Shoal Light was a lighthouse located in the James River near Newport News, Virginia. It outlasted all other lighthouses in the James, finally succumbing to ice in the 1970s.

== History ==
White Shoal sits in the center of the James just upstream of Newport News. A light was first lit here in 1855, replacing a daybeacon placed the previous year. Two other lights, those at Deepwater Shoals and Point of Shoals, were erected at the same time.

By 1869 the structure at White Shoal was leaning badly and was declared unsafe, being described by the Lighthouse Board as being "of the oldest and most inferior design". A new light was constructed in 1871 and given a fifth-order Fresnel lens. In spite of its exposed location, it managed to survive until 1934 without serious incident. In that year, it was sold to a private individual and a new unmanned tower was erected a short distance upstream. The structure gradually decayed but remained in place until the mid-1970s, when ice-flows pushed the house off its foundation. At the time of its demise, White Shoal Light was the last surviving lighthouse on the James River, and one of only two privately owned lighthouses along the Chesapeake Bay.

The foundation of the lighthouse still survives but is not lit.
