= Tangier Sound Light =

Lighthouse in Virginia, United States

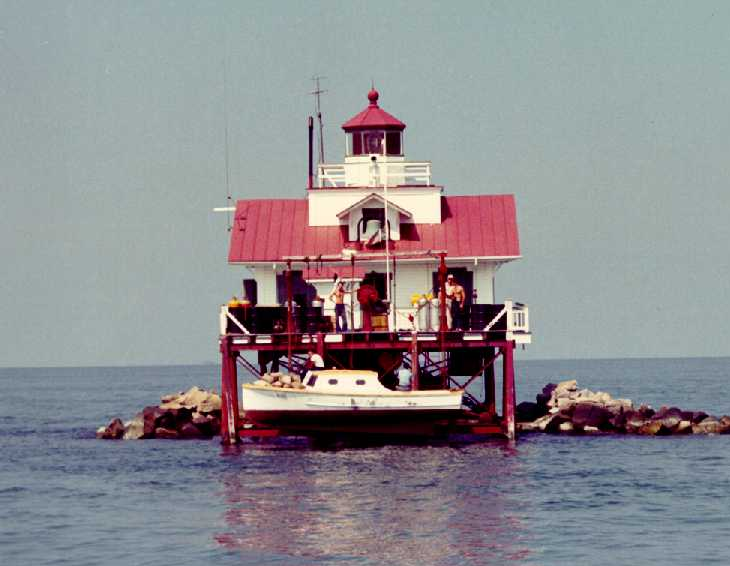
- Undated photograph of Tangier Sound Light (USCG)
- Location: South of Tangier Island in the Chesapeake Bay
- Coordinates: 37.7878°N 75.9740°W

Tower
- Foundation: screw-pile
- Construction: cast-iron/wood
- Height: 45 feet (14 m)
- Shape: square house

Light
- First lit: 1890
- Deactivated: 1961
- Characteristic: white 6 sec flash with red sector

The Tangier Sound Light was a lighthouse located south of Tangier Island in the Chesapeake Bay.

== History ==
This light was constructed in 1890 to mark a shoal extending south from Tangier Island, delimiting the western edge of the sound. Its exposed location made it vulnerable to ice, and on February 15, 1905, the sunken pungy Mary L. Colburn was lifted up by the ice and cast against the lighthouse. The light survived when the wind changed and blew the wreck clear. In the only other incident of note, the assistant keeper was drowned in 1914 in spite of an attempted rescue by the keeper. At some later date the light was surrounded by rip rap to protect it from ice.

As with other screw-pile lights in the bay, the house was removed in 1961 and an automated light set upon the foundation.
