= Tue Marshes Light =

Lighthouse in Virginia, United States

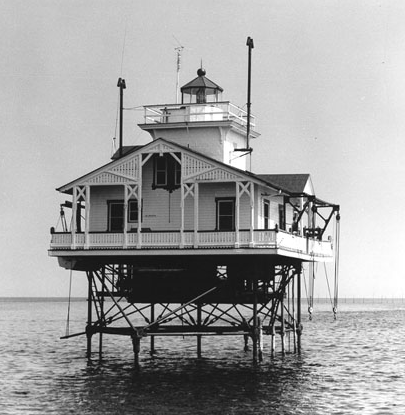
- Undated photograph of Tue Marshes Light (USCG)
- Location: North of Tue Point at the mouth of the York River in the Chesapeake Bay
- Coordinates: 37.2356°N 76.3859°W

Tower
- Constructed: 1875
- Foundation: screw-pile
- Construction: cast-iron/wood
- Height: 41 feet (12 m)
- Shape: square house

Light
- First lit: 1875
- Deactivated: 1960
- Lens: sixth-order Fresnel lens
- Range: 7.0 nautical miles; 13 kilometres (8 mi)
- Characteristic: Flashing 6 sec w/red sector

The Tue Marshes Light was a lighthouse located at the mouth of the York River in the Chesapeake Bay north of Tue Point near the Goodwin Islands.

== History ==
This light was erected in 1875. The location was originally called "Too Marshes", but the present spelling was adopted around 1900. The less common square foundation was supplemented by fender pilings on the east and west ends; the house was unusual in its gingerbread trim on the gables. The lighthouse was dismantled in 1960. A steel skeleton tower was placed on the old foundation and was removed by the Coast Guard in 2015.
