= Pages Rock Light =

Lighthouse in Virginia, United States

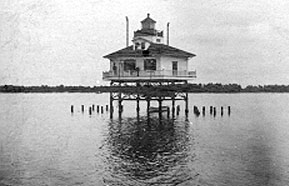
- Undated photograph of Pages Rock Light (USCG)
- Location: Southwest of Blundering Point in the York River Northwest of Yorktown, Virginia
- Coordinates: 37.3109°N 76.5866°W

Tower
- Foundation: wood-pile
- Construction: cast iron/wood
- Automated: 1960
- Height: 43 feet (13 m)
- Shape: hexagonal house

Light
- First lit: 1893
- Deactivated: 1967
- Lens: fourth-order Fresnel lens
- Characteristic: white 6 sec flash with red sector

The Pages Rock Light was a lighthouse located in the York River in the Chesapeake Bay.

== History ==
This light was constructed in 1893, a late date for a screw-pile structure. The hexagonal house was prefabricated at Lazaretto Point in Baltimore and apparently had an unexciting career before its removal in 1967 as part of the general program of decommissioning screw pile lights in the bay.
