= Goodwin Islands =

Virginian group of islands

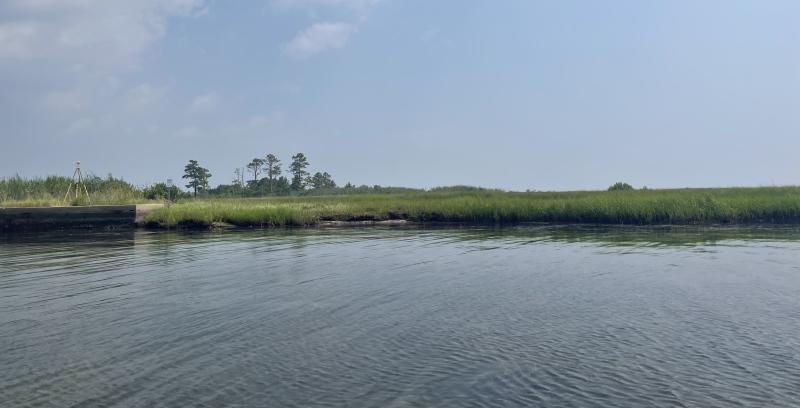

Geography
- Location: York River east of Seaford
- Coordinates: 37°13′00″N 076°24′00″W
- Area: 1.21 sq mi (3.1 km^{2})

Administration
- United States
- State: Virginia
- County: York

The Goodwin Islands are a 315-hectare (780-acre) archipelago of uninhabited salt marsh islands off the coast of York County, Virginia, at the mouth of the York River in Chesapeake Bay. They are owned by the College of William & Mary and are managed on the college's behalf by the Virginia Institute of Marine Science. The sole means of transportation to the Goodwin Islands is by boat, with permission being required to perform certain activities.

The islands and their surrounding waters are home to many birds and fish, such as the mummichog. Primary ecological community groups are situated on the islands, such as tidal meso-polyhaline marshes, maritime dune grasslands, salt scrub, and maritime upland forest. Salt marsh vegetation throughout the island primarily consists of salt marsh cordgrass and salt meadow hay. Shrub vegetation is dominant at forested wet land ridges. The upland ridges of the largest island in the archipelago are home to oak and pine tree species. Tides in the waters of the Goodwin Islands are semi-diurnal.

Climate change has posed a significant threat to the islands, with shoreline erosion from storms frequently occurring and impacting local species. A water monitoring program and a biological monitoring program have been active since 1997.

The Goodwin Islands are observed to harbor prehistoric and historic resources; however, an official archaeological survey has not been conducted.
