= Thimble Shoal Light =

Lighthouse in Virginia, United States

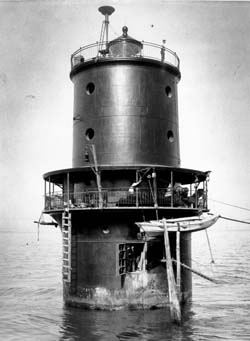
- Undated photograph of Thimble Shoal Light; A temporary structure sits on the old screw-pile foundation to the right.
- Location: in the Chesapeake Bay, Virginia four miles ENE of the Hampton Roads Bridge-Tunnel
- Coordinates: 37.0146°N 76.2399°W

Tower
- Constructed: 1872 (first light); 1880 (second light)
- Foundation: caisson
- Construction: cast iron/concrete
- Automated: 1964
- Shape: Cylindrical
- Markings: Red conical tower on brown cylindrical pier
- Heritage: National Register of Historic Places listed place, Virginia Historic Landmark

Light
- First lit: 1914
- Focal height: 55 feet (17 m)
- Lens: fourth order Fresnel lens (original), RB-355 aerobeacon (current)
- Range: 18 nautical miles (33 km; 21 mi)
- Characteristic: Flashing white, 10 sec
- Thimble Shoal Light Station
- U.S. National Register of Historic Places
- Virginia Landmarks Register
- Nearest city: Hampton City, Virginia
- Area: less than one acre
- Built: 1914
- Built by: U.S. Lighthouse Board
- MPS: Light Stations of the United States MPS
- NRHP reference No.: 02001436
- VLR No.: 114-0096

Significant dates
- Added to NRHP: December 2, 2002
- Designated VLR: September 10, 2003

Thimble Shoal Light is a sparkplug lighthouse in the Virginia portion of the Chesapeake Bay, north of the Hampton Roads channel. The third light at this location, it is listed on the National Register of Historic Places.

== History ==
The first light at this location was a hexagonal screw-pile lighthouse erected in 1872, replacing the last lightship stationed within the bay. It was destroyed by fire in 1880 and replaced in the same year with a new house on the same foundation. This was facilitated by the availability of a newly constructed house originally intended for the Bells Rock Light, so that the light was out of service for only fifty-five days.

The second light was plagued by collisions with passing ships: it was struck by a steamer in 1891, by a coal barge in 1898, and finally by the schooner Malcolm Baxter, Jr., which struck the lighthouse on December 27, 1909 while under tow. This last collision damaged the foundation and overturned the stove in the house, which was destroyed by fire.

A caisson light was placed next to the old site in 1914; in the meantime, a temporary light perched on the remains of the old screw-pile foundation. This light has several unusual features for such lights in the bay area, most notably the diamond-shaped panes in the lantern and the round porthole windows. Unlike its predecessors, it passed time relatively uneventfully, with automation coming in 1964. The broken, skeletal remains of the old foundation remained next to the light until their removal in the 2000s. As with most lights the original Fresnel lens has been removed, replaced by more modern beacons; in this case the lens is displayed at the Coast Guard Training Center in Yorktown, Virginia. Though worn from years of vacancy, it retains most of the canopy over the lower level gallery. In 2005 it was sold at auction to a private interest, but remains an active aid to navigation.
