= Great Wicomico River Light =

Lighthouse in Virginia, United States

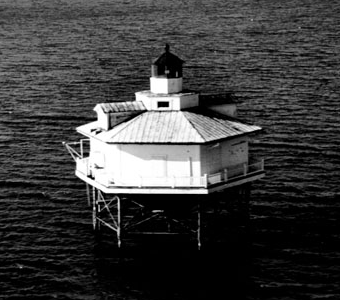
- Undated photograph of Great Wicomico River Light (USCG)
- Location: Mouth of the Great Wicomico River
- Coordinates: 37.8042°N 76.2675°W

Tower
- Foundation: screw-pile
- Construction: cast-iron/wood
- Height: 42 feet (13 m)
- Shape: hexagonal house

Light
- First lit: 1889
- Deactivated: 1967
- Lens: fourth-order Fresnel lens
- Range: 6.1 nautical miles; 11 kilometres (7 mi)
- Characteristic: Flashing 6 sec

The Great Wicomico River Light was a lighthouse located at the mouth of the Great Wicomico River, south of the Potomac River on the western side of the Chesapeake Bay. It was first lit in 1889 and was deactivated in 1967.
