= Bowlers Rock Light =

Lighthouse in Virginia, United States

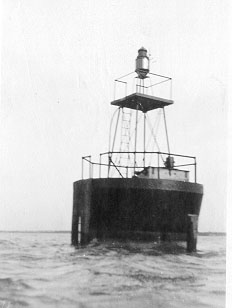
- Location: Off Bowlers Landing on the Rappahannock River
- Coordinates: 37.8245°N 76.7327°W

Tower
- Constructed: 1868
- Foundation: screw-pile
- Construction: cast-iron/wood
- Shape: square house

Light
- First lit: 1868
- Deactivated: 1920

The Bowlers Rock Light was a lighthouse located in the Rappahannock River in Virginia, United States.

== History ==
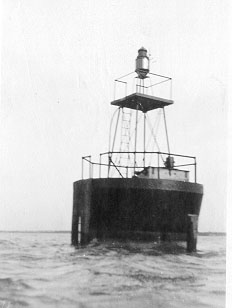
1921 Lighthouse, U.S. Coast Guard Archive

This spot was marked by lightships beginning in 1835. In 1861 the first lightship was destroyed by Confederate raiders, and a second ship replaced it in 1864, to be replaced with a screw-pile lighthouse in 1868. Although a square house was constructed, the foundation had six plies, the two extra beings provided to protect the light from ice. In spite of this a report in 1895 remarked that the light had suffered such damage and was unlikely to survive. This prediction was fulfilled in 1918, when the light was destroyed. It was officially deactivated two years later. In 1921 a small caisson structure with an automated light replaced the lighthouse, and with variations in light source, continues in service to the present.
