= Great Wicomico River =

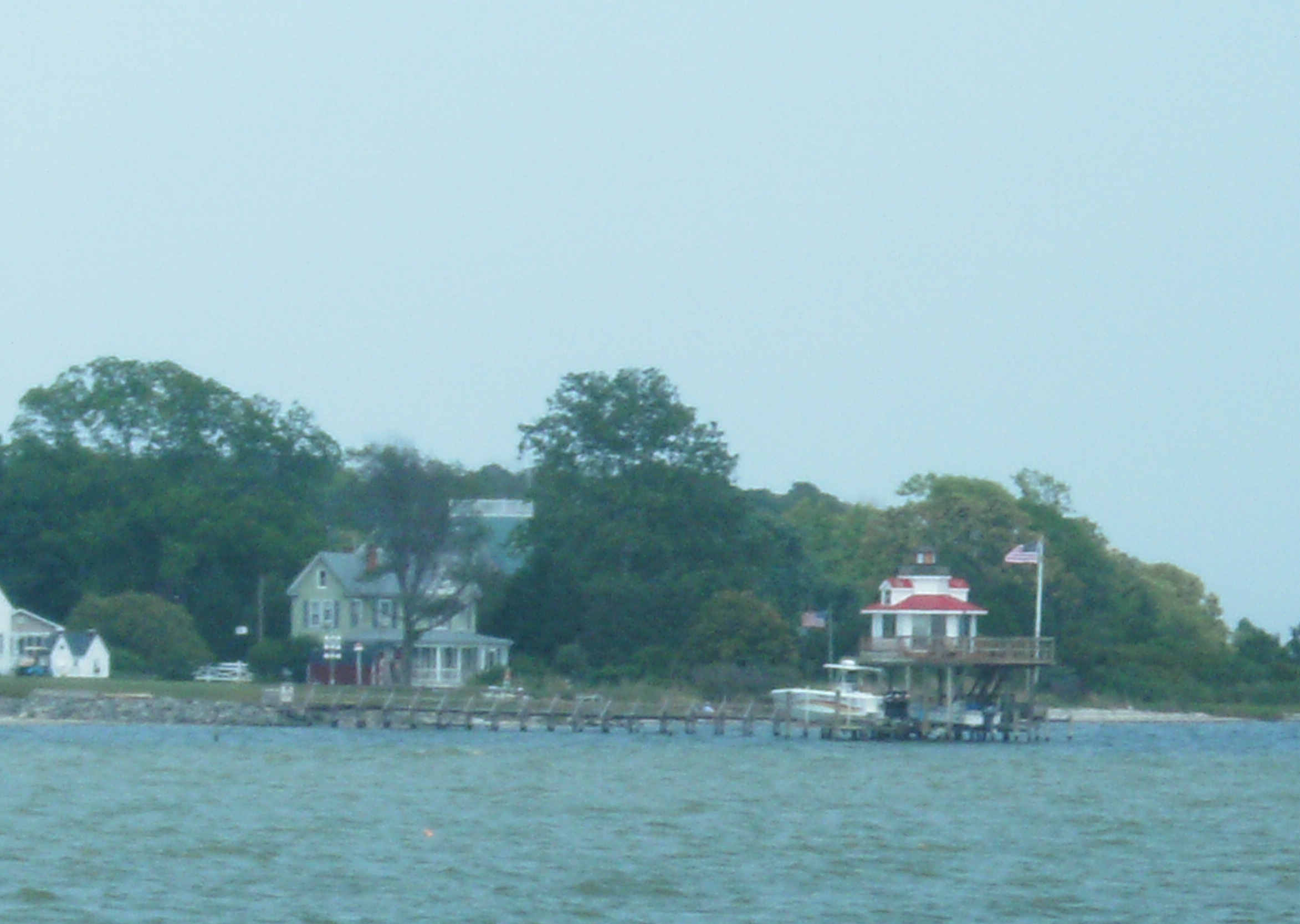

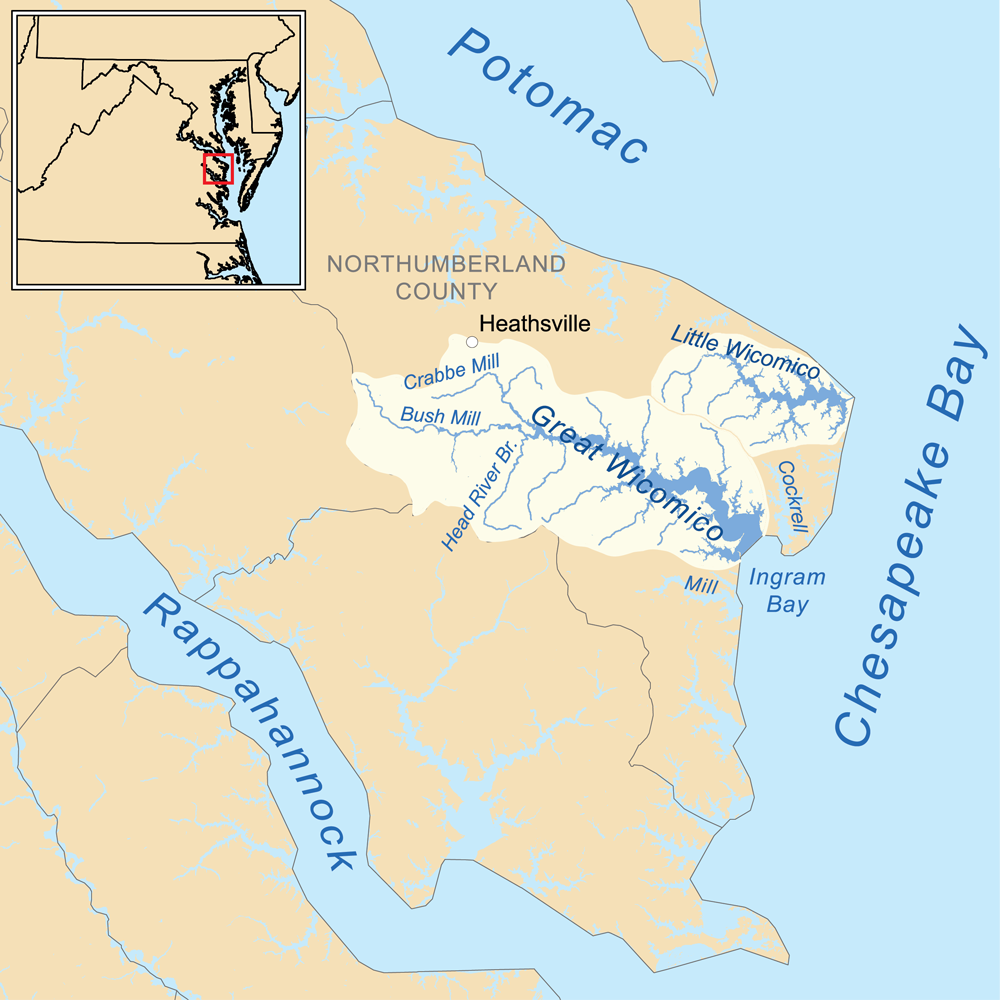

Location
- Country: United States

Physical characteristics
- Source
  - location: Virginia
- Mouth
  - location: Ingram Bay
  - coordinates: 37°49′44″N 76°19′2″W

The Great Wicomico River is a 15.2-mile-long (24.5 km) river in the U.S. state of Virginia, located approximately 60 miles (97 km) northeast of Richmond. In 1864, during the American Civil War, one of the torpedo boats of Admiral David Dixon Porter's fleet ran into the Great Wicomico River and was captured.

== Geography ==
The Great Wicomico is a small tidal tributary on the western shore of the Chesapeake Bay. It is fed by the freshwater Crabbe Mill Stream and Bush Mill Stream. The Great Wicomico flows into a trap-type estuary on Ingram Bay, with a history of significant natural spat settlement and seed oyster production. Oyster production is risky, given the high risk of disease. There are three sentinel sites present. The reefs were constructed in 1996 and 1998. The western shore of the Chesapeake Bay between the Rappahannock River and the Great Wicomico River is generally low with no prominent features. Dolphins are occasionally sighted in the river estuary.

== Fishing ==
The Dameron Marsh area near the river mouth is said to be a good area for fishing, especially stripers and trout and Spanish mackerel during the summer months.

Large numbers of menhaden afflicted with lesions are periodically caught in the Great Wicomico, and a fish kill of at least 100,000 was observed by scientists in September, 2001.

== Landmarks ==
The Great Wicomico River Light was a screwpile lighthouse erected in 1889 at the mouth of the Great Wicomico River. The original structure was deactivated in 1967; the lighthouse superstructure was dismantled and replaced with an automated skeleton tower mounted on the original pile foundation. In September 2015 the remaining structure was removed. Today, a lighthouse-shaped folly, not recognized as a navigational aid, marks the entrance of the river in Fleeton. Several wrecks are located in the Ingram Bay in the mouth of the rivers; of note are the Davidson, Old Texas and San Marcos wrecks. State Route 200 crosses the river several kilometres from the mouth near the Athena Vineyards and Winery.

== See also ==
- List of rivers of Virginia
