= Killock Shoal Light =

Lighthouse in Virginia, United States

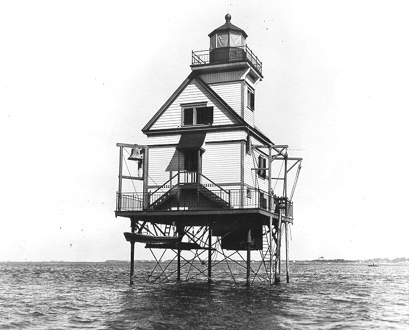
- Killock Shoal Light (USCG)
- Location: North end of Chincoteague Channel off Chincoteague, Virginia
- Coordinates: 37.5648°N 75.2239°W (approx.)

Tower
- Foundation: screw-pile
- Construction: cast-iron/wood
- Automated: 1929
- Height: 48 feet (15 m)
- Shape: square house

Light
- First lit: 1886
- Deactivated: 1939
- Focal height: 15 m (49 ft)
- Lens: fourth-order Fresnel lens
- Characteristic: fixed white with red sector

The Killock Shoal Light was a lighthouse located at the north end of the channel west of Chincoteague, Virginia.

== History ==
This light was erected in 1886. It was unlike other screw-pile structures in the area, with the lantern set at one corner of a small square frame house. It was automated in 1923, and decommissioned in 1939, with the house being replaced by a steel tower. The structure is now unlit.
