= Choptank River Light =

Lighthouse in Maryland, United States

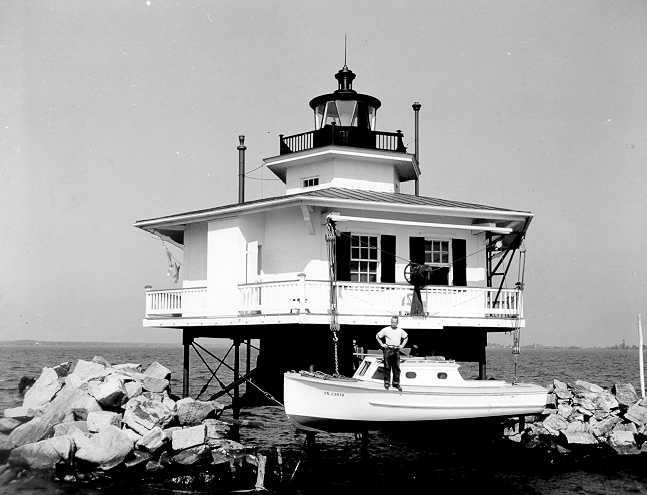
- Undated photograph of Choptank River Light, Maryland (USCG)
- Location: southeast of Bernoni Point at the mouth of the Tred Avon River, SE of Oxford, Maryland
- Coordinates: 38.6555°N 76.1855°W

Tower
- Constructed: 2012, 1871
- Foundation: screw-pile
- Construction: cast-iron/wood
- Shape: hexagonal house

Light
- First lit: 1871 (second light in 1921)
- Deactivated: 1964
- Focal height: 11 m (36 ft)
- Lens: sixth-order Fresnel lens (replaced with fifth-order lens in 1881)
- Characteristic: Fl W 4s

The Choptank River Light was a screw-pile lighthouse located near Oxford, Maryland. In its second incarnation it was the only such light moved from another location in the Chesapeake Bay.

== History ==
The first light at this location was built in 1871 by Francis A. Gibbons, replacing a lightship which was stationed there the previous year. A ten pile arrangement similar to that of the York Spit Light in Virginia was used. Initially equipped with a sixth-order Fresnel lens, it was upgraded to a fifth order lens in 1881 after ice piled up around the foundation and disturbed some of the outer piles, tilting the house slightly. A second ice flow in 1918 piled up 30 feet (9.1 m), knocking the house from the piles and destroying it.

Although consideration was given to using a caisson structure, it was decided instead to reuse the house from the Cherrystone Bar Light, which had been deactivated in 1919. This was moved by barge and placed on a new six pile foundation in 1921, making the new light the only working lighthouse to be moved from one location to another in the bay. This light lasted until 1964, when the house was dismantled as part of the general program of eliminating such lights; a skeleton tower on the old piles replaced it.

A replica of the second Choptank River Lighthouse was built on the waterfront in Cambridge, Maryland and is open for tours. It was dedicated September 22, 2012.
