= Old Plantation Flats Light =

Lighthouse in Virginia, United States

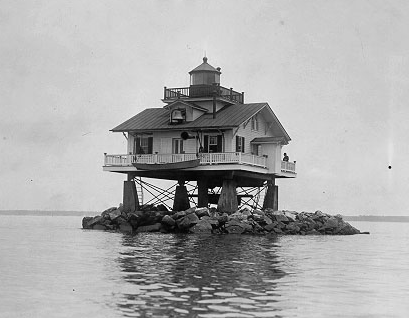
- Undated photograph of Old Plantation Flats Light (USCG)
- Location: Cape Charles, Northampton County, United States
- Coordinates: 37°14′N 76°03′W

Tower
- Constructed: 1962
- Construction: cast iron, wood, concrete
- Height: 35 ft (11 m)
- Shape: square

Light
- First lit: 1886
- Deactivated: 1962
- Focal height: 6 m (20 ft)
- Lens: fifth order Fresnel lens
- Range: 11 mi (18 km)
- Characteristic: Fl W 4 sec

The Old Plantation Flats Light was a lighthouse located in the Chesapeake Bay marking the channel to Cape Charles, Virginia.

== History ==
Old Plantation Flats is a shoal paralleling the Eastern Shore near the mouth of the bay, taking its name from Old Plantation Creek which empties into the bay near the center of the shoal. A square screw-pile light was erected on the shoal in 1886. It was constantly plagued by ice floes, with the original lens being destroyed in 1893, and more substantial damage done in 1918. After the latter the piles were reinforced with concrete and surrounded with rip-rap. The resulting structure was unlike any other in the bay.

In the 1890s the Pennsylvania Railroad established Cape Charles, Virginia as the southern terminus of its Eastern Shore rail system. The Corps of Engineers dredged out a lagoon and created a channel running across the flats, with the light serving to mark its entrance. This channel allowed the railroad to connect to points west through car float operations.

In 1962 the house was removed from the light and replaced with the usual skeleton tower. However, in 2004 a replica was constructed as part of the Bay Creek Resort and Club being built south of Cape Charles. This replica includes a 1940s-era fog bell taken from a retired buoy and a new fourth-order lens, the first constructed in eighty years. Another half size replica sits astride a golf cart causeway, forming a sort of covered bridge.
