= New Point, Virginia =

Unincorporated community in Virginia, US

Coordinates: 37°20′44″N 76°16′40″W

New Point is an unincorporated community in Mathews County, in the U. S. state of Virginia.
