= Jordan Point Light =

Lighthouse in Virginia, United States

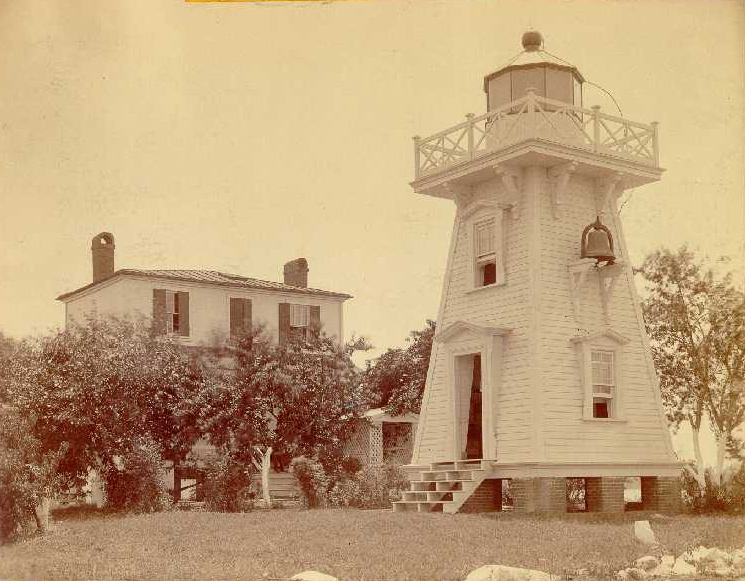
- The second Jordan Point Light in 1885
- Location: Jordan Point on the south bank of the James River
- Coordinates: 37.31304°N 77.22344°W (approx.)

Tower
- Constructed: 1855
- Construction: wood
- Height: 18 m (59 ft)
- Shape: Freestanding tower
- Fog signal: Bell

Light
- First lit: 1856/1875(1870?)
- Deactivated: 1927
- Focal height: 35 feet (11 m)
- Lens: sixth-order Fresnel lens
- Characteristic: Fixed white

The Jordan Point Light was a lighthouse located on Jordan Point on the James River in Prince George County, Virginia, near the south end of the present Benjamin Harrison Memorial Bridge.

== History ==
The history of this station is unclear, but some sources indicate that a light station was first established on Jordan Point in 1855. This consisted of a keeper's house with a masthead light on the roof. This arrangement was replaced circa 1875 (possibly as early as 1870) by a separate 35-foot (11 m) pyramidal wooden tower that housed a sixth order Fresnel lens and a fog bell. A new keeper's house was constructed in 1888.

In 1927 the station was deactivated and the wooden tower was later demolished. In 1941 a new steel skeleton tower was erected on the site of the old tower; this skeleton tower is still in service as the rear light of the Jordan Point Range, Light List #2-12420. Although the wooden tower is long gone the keeper's house built in 1888 still stands. It was extensively renovated in 2009 and is a private residence.
