= Point of Shoals Light =

Lighthouse in Virginia, United States

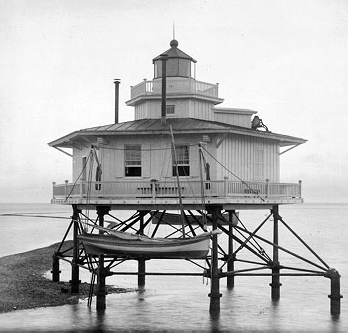
- Undated photograph of Point of Shoals Light (USCG)
- Location: In Burwell Bay on the James River
- Coordinates: 37.0683°N 76.6530°W

Tower
- Constructed: 1855
- Foundation: screw-pile
- Construction: cast-iron/wood
- Automated: 1932
- Shape: hexagonal house

Light
- First lit: 1871 (latest structure)
- Deactivated: 1933
- Lens: sixth-order Fresnel lens
- Characteristic: Fixed white

The Point of Shoals Light was a lighthouse located in the James River in Virginia.

== History ==
The first request for a light to mark the shoal at this bend in the river came in 1835, but a light was not constructed here until 1855. It was the target of a Confederate raid in the Civil War, and by 1869 concerns were raised about its safety. These concerns were realized two years later when damage from ice flows brought about the rebuilding of the structure.

This light was automated fairly early, in 1932. Its unmanned life was brief, as continued shoaling in old channel led to the dredging of a new channel on the opposite side of the river the following year, at which point the light was deactivated. The house was removed in the 1960s, but the iron foundation remains, unlit.
