= Cherrystone Bar Light =

Lighthouse in Virginia, US

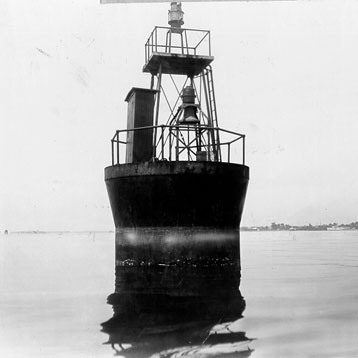
- Location: SW of Cape Charles, Virginia harbor in the Chesapeake Bay
- Coordinates: 37.2564°N 76.0324°W

Tower
- Foundation: screw-pile
- Construction: cast-iron/wood
- Shape: hexagonal house

Light
- First lit: 1858
- Deactivated: 1919
- Lens: fourth-order Fresnel lens

The Cherrystone Bar Light was a lighthouse located at the entrance to Cape Charles, Virginia harbor in the Chesapeake Bay. It was the only light in the bay moved to another location, becoming the Choptank River Light in 1921.

== History ==
This light was constructed shortly before the Civil War, and like the other Virginia lights, it was put out of commission by the Confederate forces. It was reactivated by Union forces in 1862.

In 1919, a simple skeleton tower on a small caisson was erected to replace the old light. The following year, the house was lifted from its foundation and barged north, where it was set on a new foundation to replace the Choptank River Light, which had been destroyed by ice in 1918. This light was eventually dismantled in 1964, but the caisson light at the original location remains in use.
