= Tangier, Virginia =

Town and island in the Chesapeake Bay, United States

Tangier Island, Virginia
- Town
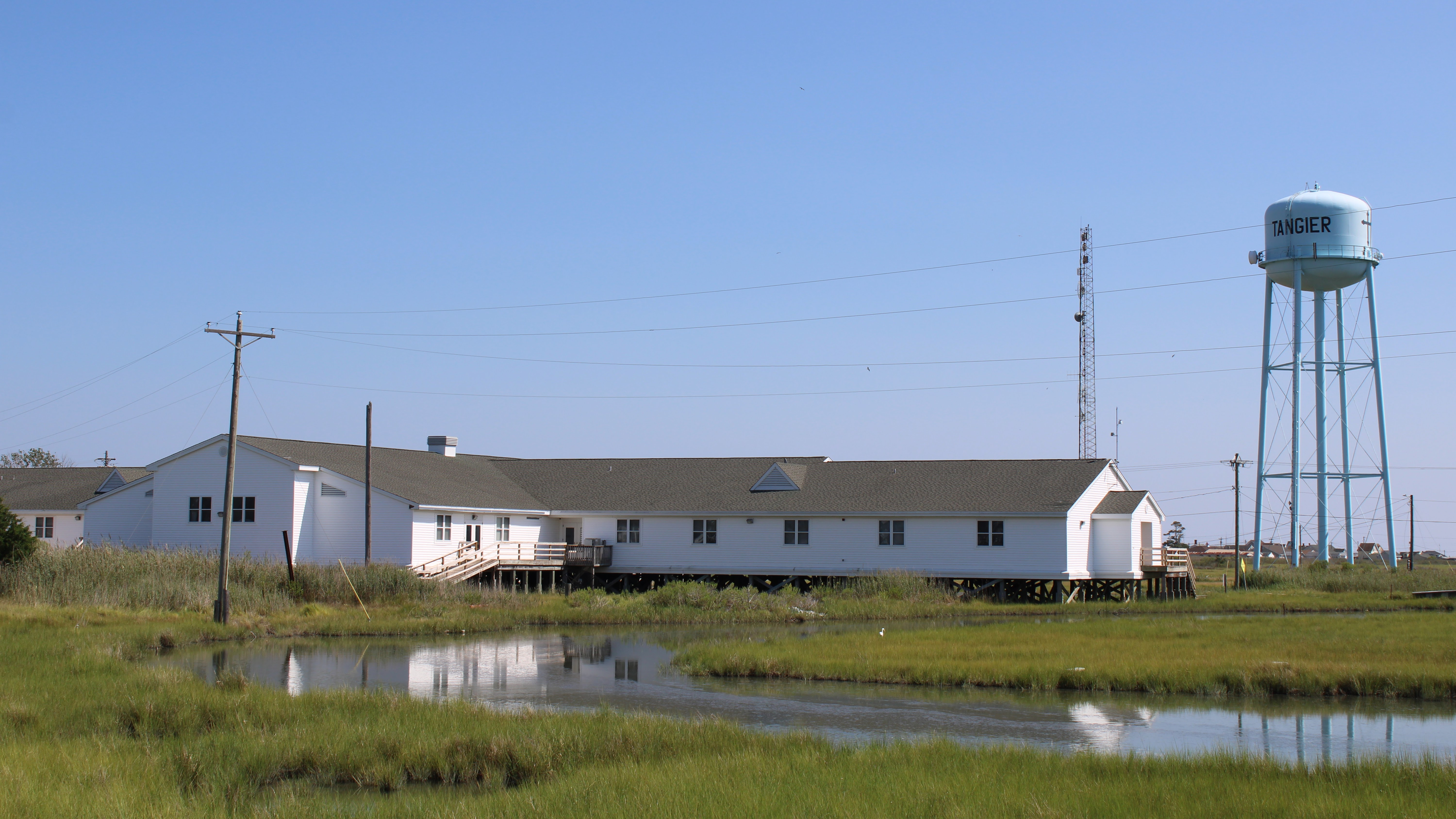
- Tangier Combined School and the Tangier water tower, two landmarks on the island

- Flag
- Interactive map of Tangier Island, Virginia
- Location within Virginia
- Coordinates: 37°49′33″N 75°59′32″W
- Country: United States
- State: Virginia
- County: Accomack

Government
  - Mayor: James Eskridge

Area
  - Total: 0.54 sq mi (1.40 km^{2})
  - Land: 0.54 sq mi (1.40 km^{2})
  - Water: 0 sq mi (0.00 km^{2})
- Elevation: 3 ft (0.91 m)

Population (2020)
  - Total: 436
  - Density: 806.6/sq mi (311.42/km^{2})
- Time zone: UTC-5 (Eastern (EST))
  - Summer (DST): UTC-4 (EDT)
- ZIP code: 23440
- Area codes: 757, 948
- FIPS code: 51-77520
- GNIS feature ID: 1500206
- Website: https://tangiervirginia.org/

Tangier is a town in Accomack County, Virginia, United States, on Tangier Island in the Chesapeake Bay. The population was 436 at the 2020 census. Since 1850, the island's landmass has been reduced by 67%. Under the mid-range sea level rise scenario, much of the remaining landmass is expected to be lost in the next 50 years and the town will likely need to be abandoned.

The people who came to permanently settle the island arrived in the 1770s, and were farmers. In the late 19th century, the islanders began to become more dependent on harvesting crabs and oysters from the Chesapeake Bay. As the waterman livelihood became more important and more lucrative, there were often conflicts among the oyster dredgers and oyster tongers in the bay, and between those living in Maryland and those living in Virginia.

Many people who live on Tangier speak a distinctive dialect of Southern American English. Scholars have disputed how much of the dialect is derived from British English lexicon and phonetics, particularly from Cornish. Linguist David Shores has argued that there is little evidence for this claim and, while the Tangier dialect is distinctive, it is more likely a mixture of several regional dialects on the Eastern Seaboard. The persistence of this dialectal variety is often attributed to the geographic isolation of the population from the mainland. Tangier Island is listed on the National Register of Historic Places.

== History ==
Tangier Island was likely used as a hunting and fishing ground by Native Americans prior to European arrival. A number of Native American artifacts and a large oyster midden have been found on the island, but the island was not inhabited when it was visited in 1608 by John Smith. Smith called the region the "Russel Isles", but it is unclear whether this name was applied originally to Tangier, the nearby Watts Island, or both.

In 1670, Ambrose White, a tavern owner from Accomac, Virginia, received a patent for the island. The next year, it was transferred to Charles Scarburgh and John West, two prominent estate owners from Accomack County who used the island to graze livestock.

Today many of the inhabitants have the surname Crockett, which was the name of the first permanent Anglo-American settler in the late 18th century, John Crockett. Other common surnames on the island include Pruitt, Thomas, Marshall, Charnock, Dise, Shores, and Parks. By 1900 there were 1,064 inhabitants.

The British used the island as a staging area in 1813 and 1814 under Rear Admiral George Cockburn during the War of 1812, constructing Fort Albion when there were as many as 1,200 British troops recorded as being present on the island at one time. Many black slaves escaped to the British on Tangier and were given their freedom. Some joined the Corps of Colonial Marines. When a dozen British sailors were captured, their account both of the hardships encountered there, with shortages of food and water on the island, and of the construction of Fort Albion were reported in a local newspaper.

Tangier was used as the base for the attack on the American capital in the decisive British victory at Bladensburg and the subsequent Burning of Washington in August 1814. This was followed by the Battle of Baltimore, when a failed British naval bombardment and barge assault on Fort McHenry in Baltimore harbor and the simultaneous Battle of North Point southeast of the city on September 12–14, 1814, influenced Francis Scott Key's writing of the poem that became "The Star-Spangled Banner", named the American national anthem in 1931.

In February 1936, the US Army Air Corps used 13 B-10Bs of the 49th Bomb Squadron to drop supplies to the residents of Virginia's Tangier Island and Maryland's Smith Island; with ships unable to reach the islands due to heavy ice in the Chesapeake Bay, the islanders faced starvation after a severe winter storm.

The original church on the island was called Lee's Bethel and burned down in the 19th century. A bench marking its location is in the graveyard in Canton. The oldest church that still exists on the island, Swain Memorial Methodist Church, was established in 1835. The only other currently standing church on the island is called the New Testament Congregation, established in 1946, and is a non-denominational Christian place of worship. For various reasons, both historical and practical (such as overcrowding), burials are sometimes located in the yards of houses. There are also churchyard cemeteries at each of the island's churches.

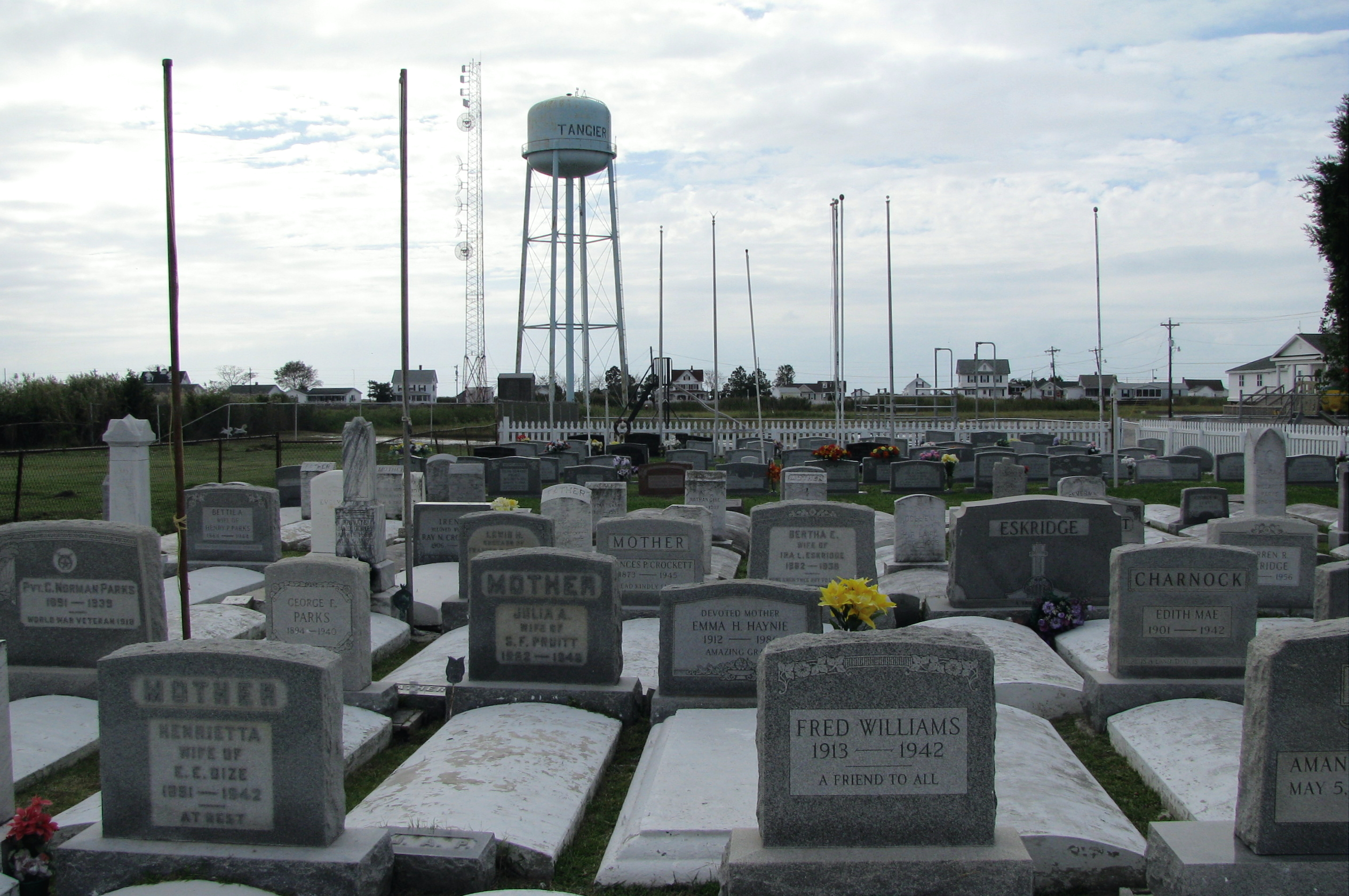
A typical cemetery on the island, showing overcrowding

Three 21st-century hurricanes, Isabel in 2003, Ernesto in 2006, and Sandy in 2012, caused much of the island to flood. A few houses were abandoned or torn down due to storm damage, while others have been elevated on new foundations. New buildings continue to be built on the island.

In the 1960s, the United States Army took over portions of Tangier Island via eminent domain, forcing some residents, including Walter Crockett and Maggie Eskridge Crockett, to move to Exmore, on mainland Virginia, so the military could conduct missile testing.

A northern channel was cut through Tangier in 1966, which Tangiermen had been petitioning the government to dredge since 1959. This channel has been dredged regularly by the U.S. Army Corps of Engineers since it was first created in 1966. The channel has been linked to worsening shoreline erosion on the western side of the island.

== Geography ==
Map of Tangier and its surrounding islands

Tangier Island is located in the Chesapeake Bay in Accomack County, Virginia. The island is composed of three sandy ridges divided by marshes and tidal streams. These three ridges, called West Ridge, Main Ridge, and Canton Ridge from west to east, run parallel north-to-south. Most of the island's institutions, including the post office, restaurants, and Tangier Combined School, are located on the Main Ridge. The island's West Ridge has four bridges to the Main Ridge and a seawall built in 1990 to combat erosion, and it is also home to Tangier Island Airport. Canton Ridge is connected by just one bridge and, while once the largest ridge with up to 30 families, today is the smallest ridge and home to just a few families.

Some smaller, mostly uninhabited, islands surround Tangier. The largest of these, called Uppards and located just north of the main island, was home to a community of up to 40 families called Canaan before its abandonment in 1928 due to the enlargement of the channel separating it from Tangier. Today, the island contains a few structures used as hunting lodges. Port Isobel, also called East Point Marsh, lies to the east-northeast and is home to an education center owned by the Chesapeake Bay Foundation. Some other formerly inhabited islands lie north of Uppards, and some others have been submerged; these include Shanks, Wheeler's Hole, Fishbone, and Piney Islands.

=== Reduction in land mass ===
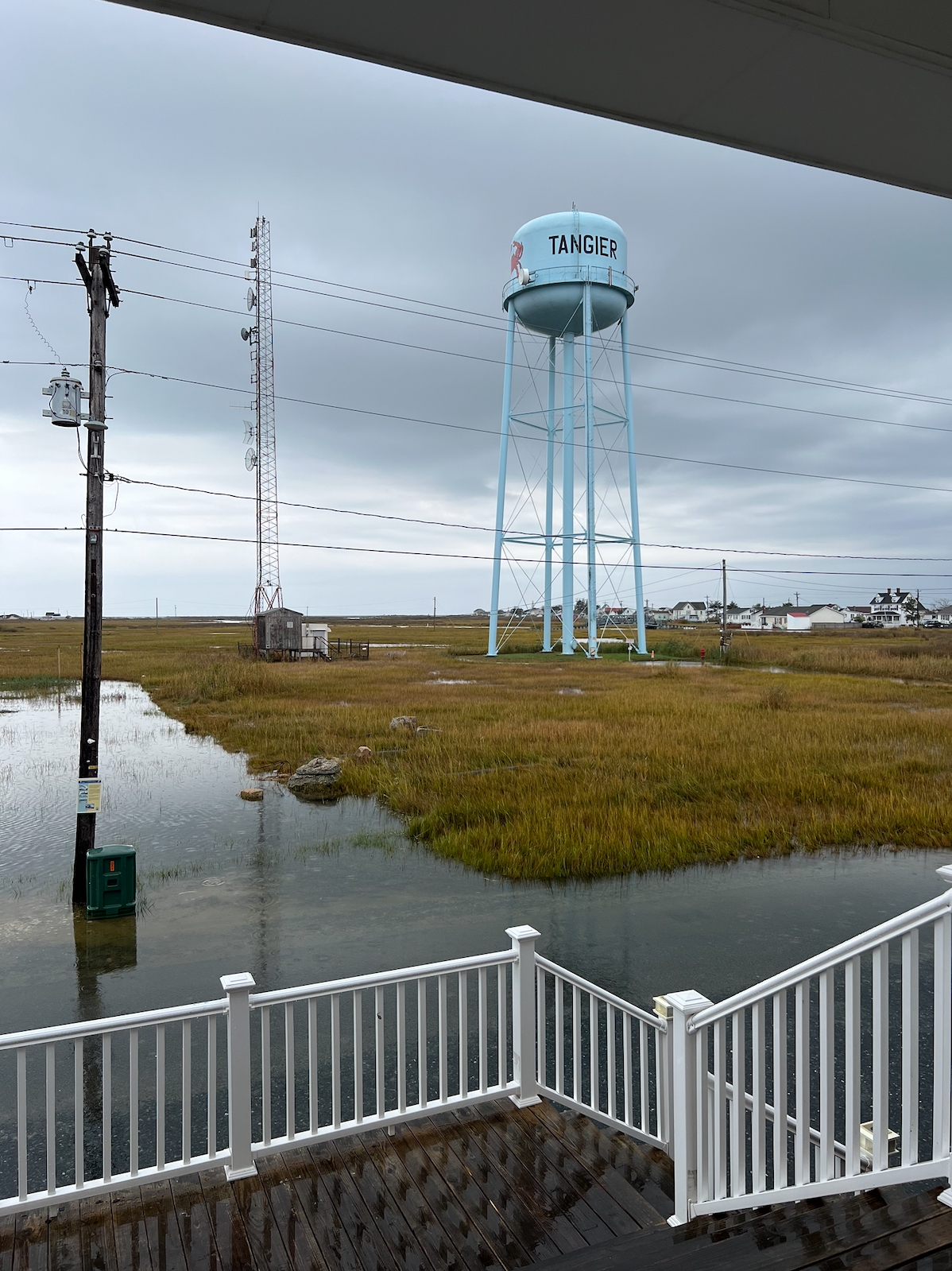
Tangier Island in October 2023, taken at high tide from the steps of Tangier Combined School.

The island is at risk of disappearing due to upland to wetland conversion and rising sea levels caused by climate change; since 1850, the island's landmass has been reduced by 67%. Under a mid-range sea level rise scenario, two of the islands' three ridges are expected to become wetland in the 2030s, with the third expected to succumb by 2051.

Many residents believe that erosion is the cause of the increasing incidence and severity of flooding. Islanders often self-identify as "climate change deniers" or "science skeptics," a position that anthropologist Jonna Yarrington's ethnographic work has proven to be as much about identity among islanders as it is about identity and party politics off of the island.

A 2015 study by Davide M. Schulte, Karin M. Dridge, and Mark H. Hudgins, all members of the Army Corps of Engineers, concluded that Tangier has 25–50 years of habitability remaining and that the subsidence of the ridges is ongoing since at least the mid-19th century. The authors also conclude that the primary causes of the subsidence in the southern Chesapeake Bay region are sea-level rise due to the melting of the Laurentide ice sheet, groundwater extraction on mainland Virginia, and the remaining effects of the Chesapeake Bay impact crater near Cape Charles, Virginia, 35.5 million years ago.

The town has been talking with political representatives for decades to get protection for the island in the form of jetties or sea walls. The Town, the History Museum, and townspeople continue to raise money for their sea wall fund. In 2017, CNN aired a story about Tangier that featured the town's mayor, James W. Eskridge. President Donald Trump called the mayor personally to assure him that the town would survive but offered no concrete form of relief or financial aid.

=== Marshes and waterfowl ===
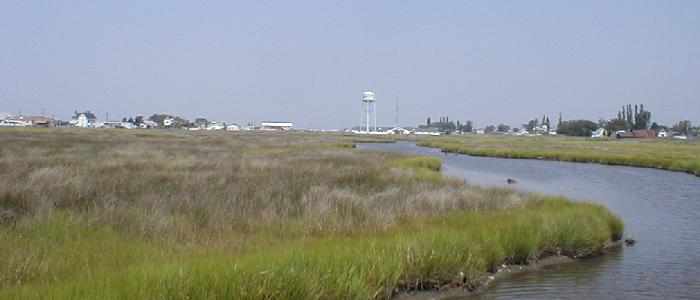
The marshes outside of town

Tangier and nearby islands are valuable tidal salt marsh habitat for waterfowl, especially as there is a general absence of predators for ground-nesting birds and birds in general. Tangier marshes are home to many birds, including pelicans, blue herons, rails, egrets, several varieties of ducks and geese, and osprey. The group of islands is one of the "few remaining population strongholds for American Black Ducks in Virginia."

Including the surrounding marshes, Tangier Island totals less than 740 acres (300 hectares), but only 83 acres (34 hectares) are high enough for habitation. The highest point of land is barely 4 feet (1.2 m) above sea level, and about 9 acres (3.6 hectares) of Tangier shoreline are estimated to erode into the Chesapeake each year. Local residents see their existence threatened from falling catches, state regulation of the waterman livelihood on the Bay, constant erosion, and increasingly frequent flooding.

== Transportation ==
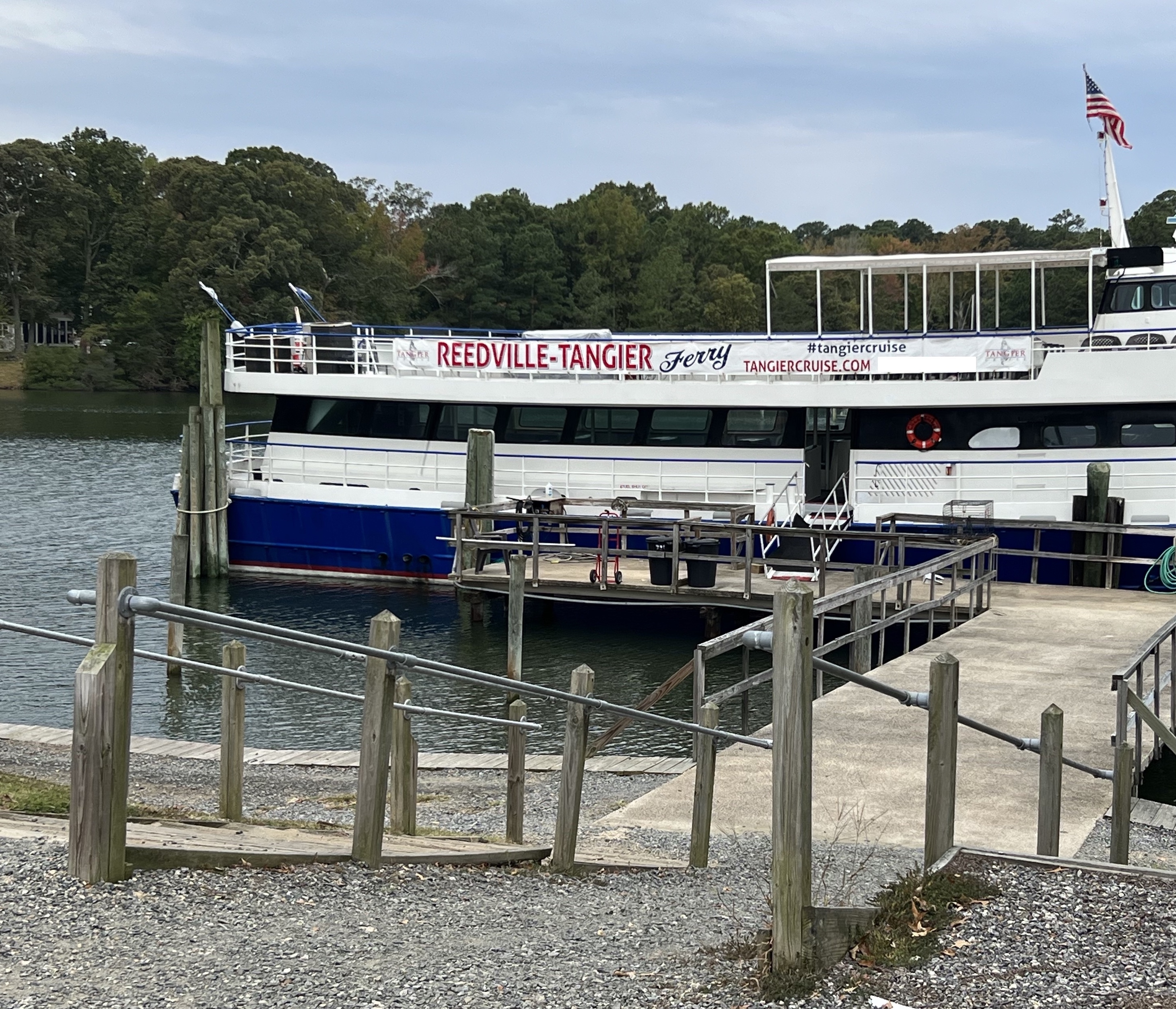
The Chesapeake Breeze, in port at Reedville, Virginia.

The only modes of transportation to and from the island are boats and airplanes. There is an airport, open from dawn to dusk. There are two boats that travel regularly from Crisfield, Maryland, across Tangier Sound to Tangier. Passengers and mail are carried on these boats. The mail boat, the Courtney Thomas, leaves Tangier at 8:00 am and leaves Crisfield at 12:30 pm. The Steven Thomas, a 300-passenger cruise boat, leaves Crisfield at 12:30 pm and departs Tangier at 4:00 pm during the summer season – from Memorial Day weekend through mid-October. In the summer season, the Chesapeake Breeze travels daily from Reedville, Virginia, on the Western Shore, leaving Reedville at 10:00 am and leaving Tangier at 2:00 pm. The ferry service to and from Onancock, Virginia on the Joyce Marie II runs daily from the first weekend of May through the first weekend of October.

Transportation on the island does not rely heavily on automobiles. Some residents outfit golf carts with passenger trailers to offer "historical tours" of the island for tourists. The roads on Tangier are wide enough for two golf carts. Tourists and islanders often use golf carts, boats, mopeds, and bikes, but some have trucks and cars.

== Language ==
A recording of a resident of Tangier Island who was born in the late 1800s, showcasing the island's unique accent

Many who live on Tangier Island speak a distinctive dialect of Southern American English, which scholars have disputed as derived from 17th and 18th-century British English (Early Modern and Modern English) lexicon and phonetics. Historical linguist David Shores has noted that, while it may sound like a British variety of English, the dialect is a creation of its own time and place off the eastern shore of Virginia, preserving certain features of its British origins in part due to isolation, but not unchanged. The persistence of this dialectical variety is often attributed to the geographic isolation of the population from the mainland. Many non-scholarly sources (i.e. the popular media and press) report that the unique dialect originated from early European settlers from Cornwall and Devon in the United Kingdom, but this is disputed by Shores. BBC Travel made a short film on the dialect.

Before bridges were built, the only form of transport between or off the ridges was by boat, allowing the islands to stay isolated from the mainland.

The local accent is sometimes compared to that of the "Hoi Toiders" of the Outer Banks of North Carolina. There are some similarities, but the dialects are distinct. Smith Island, Maryland, which is near Tangier, has a dialect that is more similar to that of Tangier in terms of phonetics and lexicon.

== Economy ==
=== Industry ===
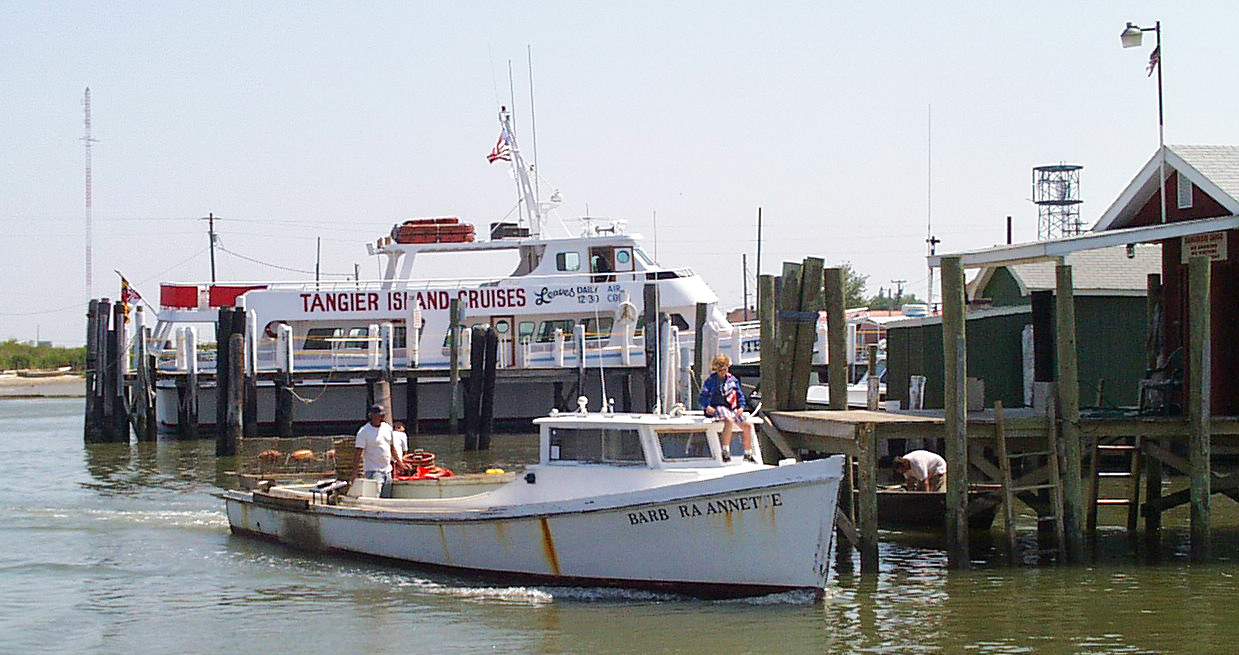
Watermen returning from fishing to Tangier Island. A tourist boat is visible in the background.

Today, the inhabitants of Tangier rely on crabbing to make a living. Tangier is often called the "soft-shell crab capital of the world", and has been referred to as one of the last waterman communities. Most fishermen catch and sell crabs and oysters. North of the island are many free-standing docks not connected to land which fishermen use to hold crabs while they moult. Once a major industry on the island, oystering has returned in recent years as a supplement to the more prominent crabbing business. In 2014, a new oyster-farming company, called Tangier Island Oyster Company, was founded by a group that includes a former attorney general of Virginia, Ken Cuccinelli.

The primary industry on the island besides fishing is tourism. During the summer, several cruise ships come to the island each day, allowing passengers to explore and buy goods from the islanders. Two bed-and-breakfast inns can accommodate a limited number of overnight guests. There are several restaurants and gift shops for the tourist trade.

=== Activities ===
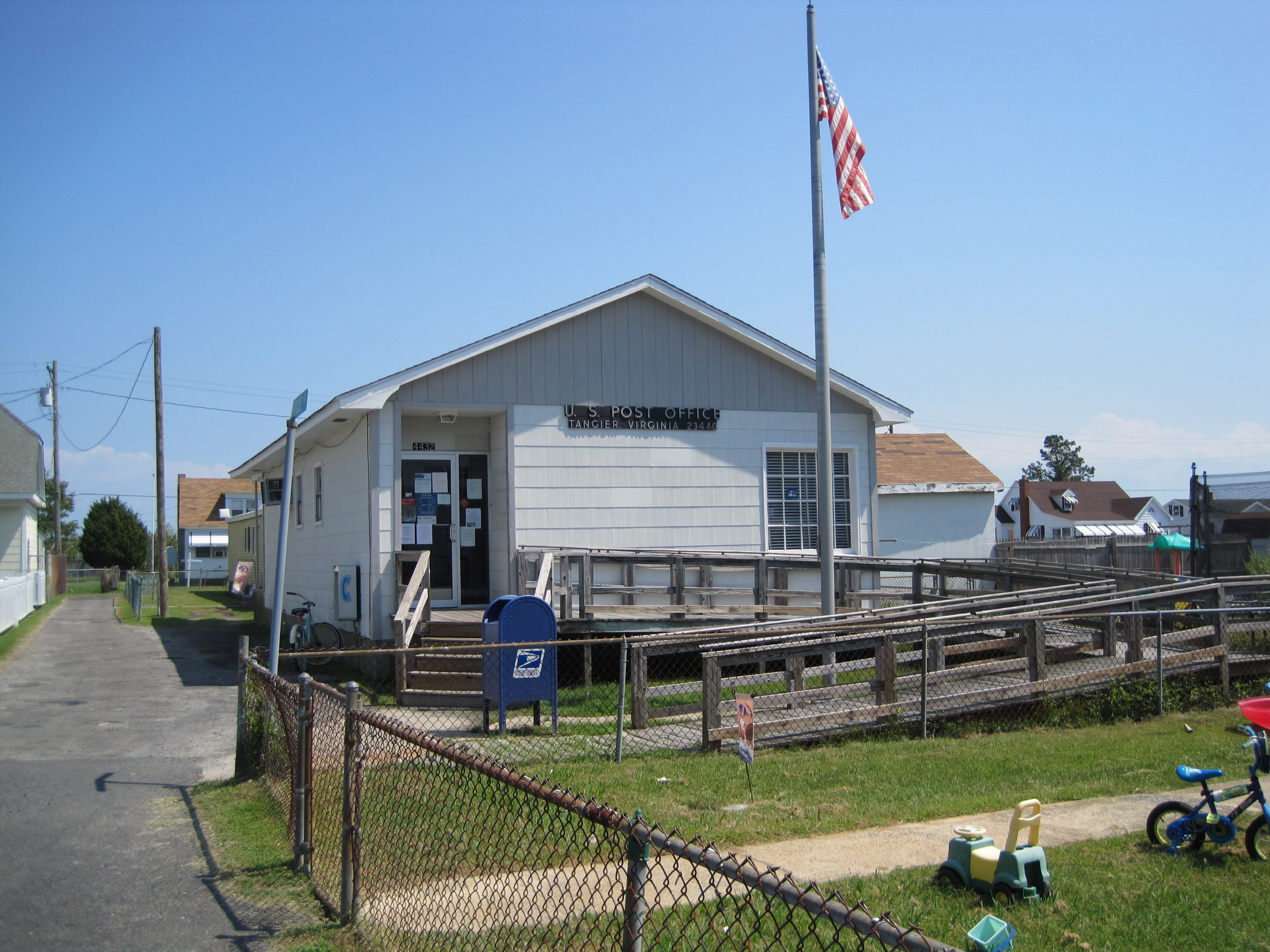
Tangier's post office

With all the means of transportation and regular telephone service, residents have regular ways of staying in touch with the mainland. The island also has cable television and internet service. The island has several restaurants, an ice cream shop, four gift shops and a hardware store. There is a wild beach without a boardwalk or concessions. There is a historical museum and interpretive cultural center. Tangier is known for its seafood dishes, especially its soft-shell crab sandwiches.

The major new addition to the island has been the Tangier Island History Museum, which created historical markers that line Tangier's streets and provides a "historical tour" of the island.

== Institutions and culture ==
The Tangier Island Health Foundation runs the Nichols Health Center on Tangier, which is operated by the Riverside Health System, which also operates on the Eastern Shore of Virginia and in Hampton Roads.

Historically, there were two cases of Tangier disease, a recessive genetic disorder that causes high blood cholesterol. These two instances represented the first ever discovery of the disease. Thus, the disease was subsequently named after the island. There are very few residents with this genetic anomaly who currently live on the island.

The residents of Tangier enjoy regular cable television and internet access through a microwave tower installed in spring 2010. There are phone lines on the island. One physician assistant and a number of registered nurses live on the island. David Nichols treated residents for thirty years, piloting a Cessna 182 or Robinson helicopter for once-a-week visits. In January 2007, he was profiled by ABC World News Tonight as its Person of the Week. Nichols died at the age of 62 on December 30, 2010, after a battle with cancer. Four months earlier, a new clinic was christened in his name, as he and a few others had raised funds for its construction. Emergency patients travel by helicopter to Crisfield or Salisbury hospitals in Maryland. Although the island has one operational power plant, it is used mainly for emergencies. Power comes in from the Eastern Shore of Virginia through an underwater cable.

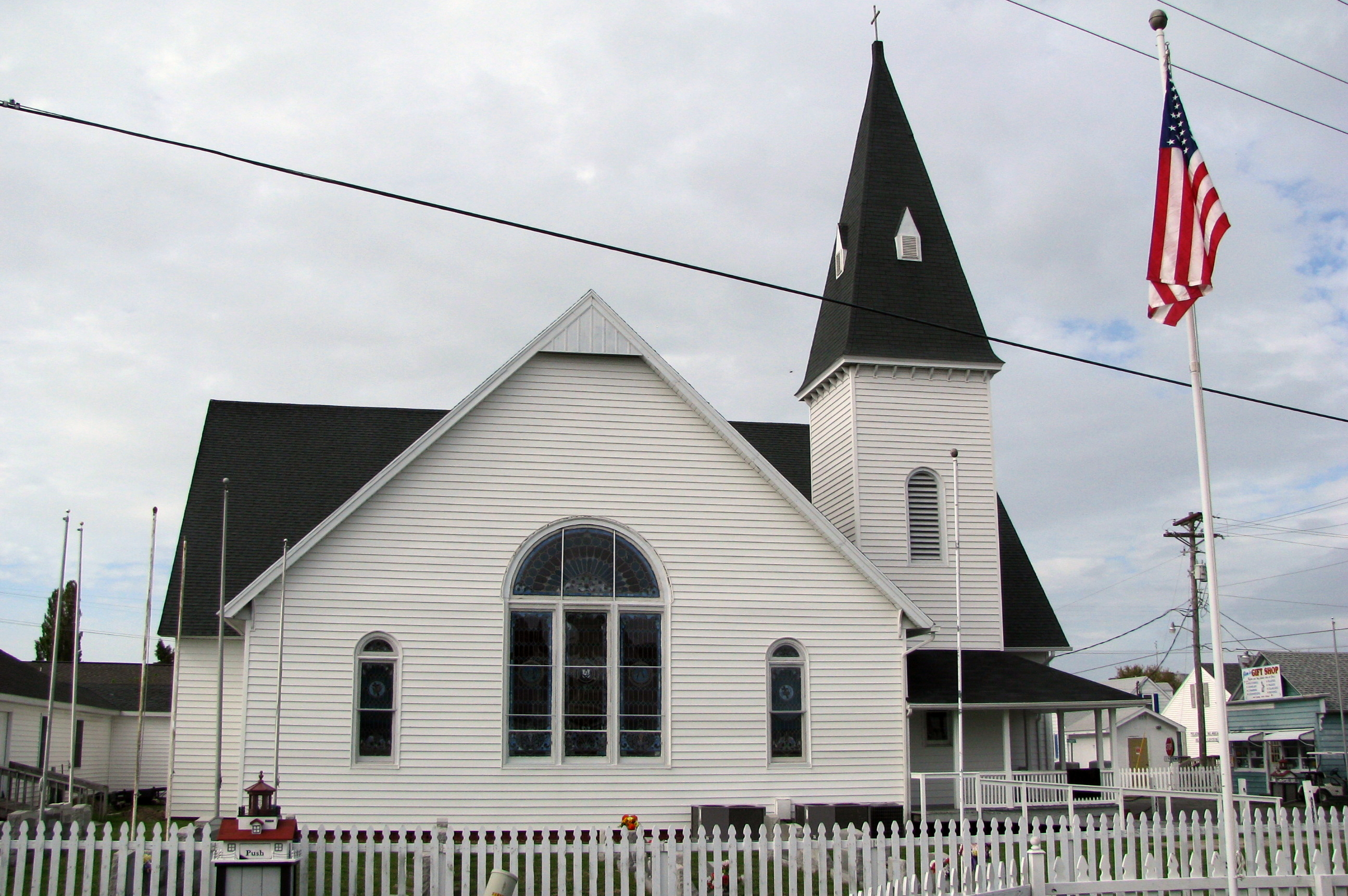
Swain Memorial United Methodist Church

Methodism has been and remains a very strong influence on Tangier, stemming from the charismatic preaching and revival camp meetings held there in the early 1800s by Joshua Thomas, the famed "parson of the islands." Because of their ties to the Northern Methodist Church, Tangier residents in the 19th century did not support slavery and did not join Virginia in seceding from the Union during the Civil War.

A local ordinance prohibits the sale of alcohol, making the island "dry." In 1999, the Tangier town council blocked Warner Brothers from using the island to film the Kevin Costner film Message in a Bottle, objecting to the script's drinking, profanity, and sex.

=== Education ===
Accomack County Public Schools operates the Tangier Combined School, the sole comprehensive K–12 public school in the Commonwealth of Virginia. As of 2018, it had 60 students.

== Politics ==
Tangier is one of the most Republican towns in the entire Chesapeake Bay.

United States presidential election results for Tangier Island, Virginia
Year	Republican		Democratic		Third party(ies)	
Year	No.	%	No.	%	No.	%
2000	328	85.42%	49	12.76%	7	1.82%
2004	303	88.60%	39	11.40%	0	0.00%
2008	241	83.68%	42	14.58%	5	1.74%
2012	197	81.74%	41	17.01%	3	1.24%
2016	221	87.35%	27	10.67%	5	1.98%
2020	209	88.56%	22	9.32%	5	2.12%
2024	200	88.11%	24	10.57%	3	1.32%

== Demographics ==
Historical population
Census	Pop.	Note	%±
1910	698		—
1920	962		37.8%
1930	1,120		16.4%
1940	1,020		−8.9%
1950	915		−10.3%
1960	876		−4.3%
1970	814		−7.1%
1980	771		−5.3%
1990	659		−14.5%
2000	604		−8.3%
2010	727		20.4%
2020	436		−40.0%
U.S. Decennial Census

=== 2020 census ===
As of the 2020 census, there were 436 people, in 205 households, comprising 213 families residing in the town. The population density was 805.9 people per square mile. There were 271 housing units at an average density of 500.9 per square mile. The racial makeup of the town was 97.9% White, with two Asian residents and seven residents of two or more races. The median age was 54.6 years.

Of the 205 households, 17.5% had children under the age of 18 living with them, 47.8% were married couples living together, and 40% were non-families. Lone individuals comprised 38.5% of all households, and 26.8% had someone living alone who was 65 years of age or older. The average household size was 2.09.

=== Demographic Decline ===
Anthropologist Jonna Yarrington, who conducted ethnographic field research living on the island in 2017 and 2018, has published peer-reviewed scholarly research that shows that islanders' psychosocial wellbeing has suffered due to the stress of living on a disappearing (i.e., subsiding) island. Yarrington has shown that islanders contend with self-reported anxiety, panic, and despair, leading some to addictions or suicide, resulting from the island's economic stress, changes to social institutions and social spaces, and demographic collapse. Tangier is an important anthropological case demonstrating "environmentally-induced distress."

== See also ==
- National Register of Historic Places listings in Accomack County, Virginia
- Smith Island, Maryland
