= Deepwater Shoals Light =

Lighthouse in Virginia, United States

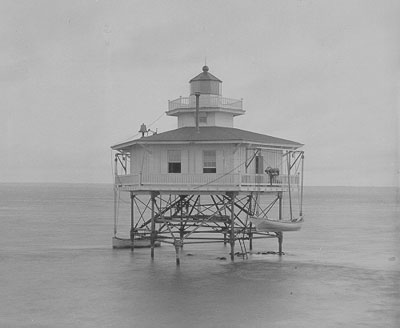
- Undated photograph of Deepwater Shoals Light (USCG)
- Location: Off Fort Eustis in the James River, northwest of Newport News, Virginia
- Coordinates: 37°8′11.46″N 76°38′12.48″W

Tower
- Constructed: 1855
- Foundation: wood-pile
- Construction: cast-iron/wood
- Height: 27 feet (8.2 m)
- Shape: hexagonal house

Light
- First lit: 1855
- Deactivated: 1936
- Lens: sixth-order Fresnel lens
- Characteristic: fixed white

The Deepwater Shoals Light was a lighthouse located in the James River upstream from Newport News, Virginia.

== History ==
This light was erected in 1855 to mark the western edge of the channel. Ice damaged the light in the following year, and again in 1867; in the latter case the light had to be rebuilt completely, at which time the light was upgraded to a sixth-order Fresnel from the previous masthead light. During the Civil War the light was extinguished by confederate forces; relit in 1862, the Lighthouse Board reconsidered and removed the lighting apparatus to Fort Monroe for safekeeping.

Decommissioning came in 1936, and the house was torn down in 1966. A steel tower light has been erected on the old iron foundation.
