= York River (Virginia) =

River in Virginia, United States

Coordinates: 37°14′52″N 76°22′57″W

York River (Pamunkey Yeokanta)
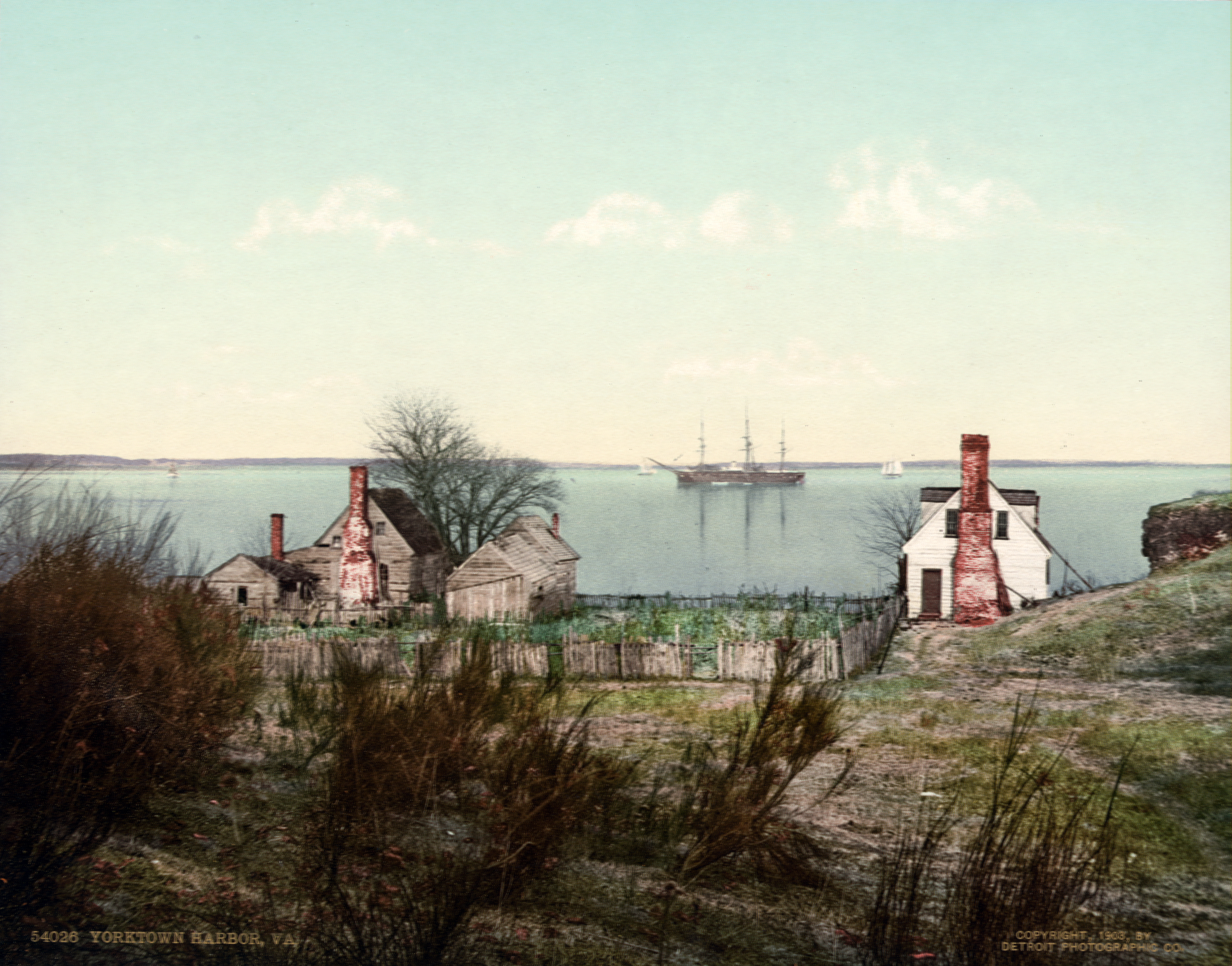
- York River at Yorktown, c. 1903

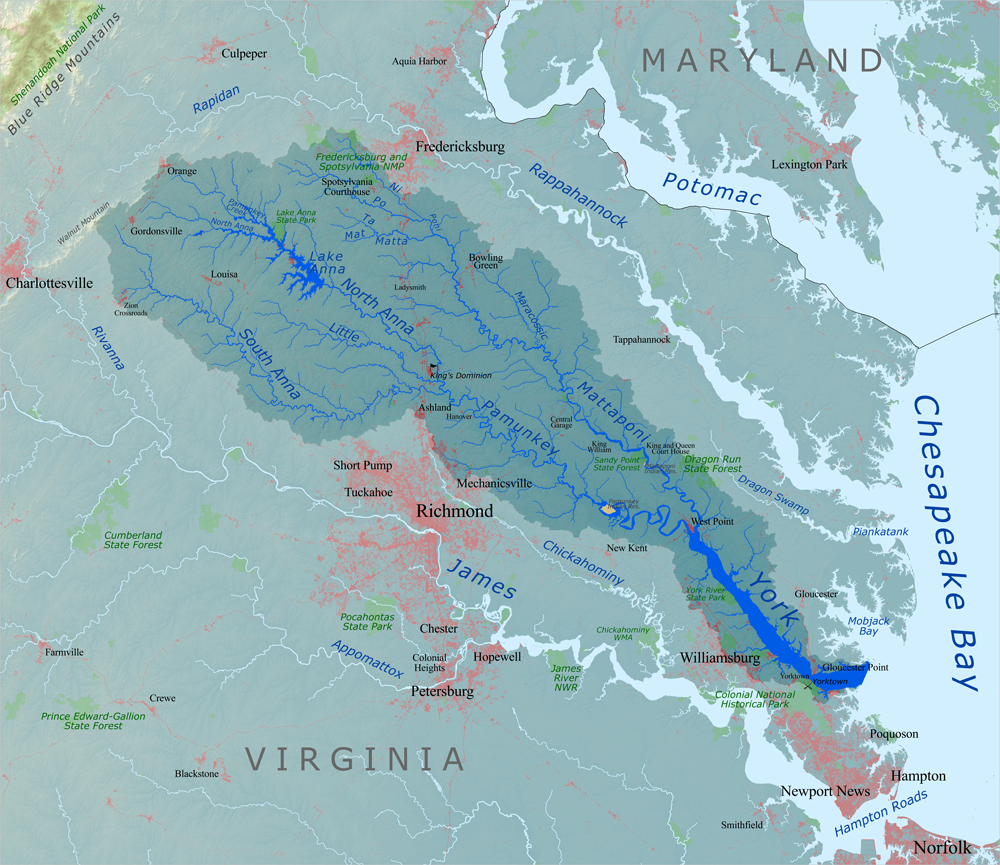
- York River drainage basin
- Etymology: York

Location
- Country: United States
- State: Virginia

Physical characteristics
- Source
  - location: West Point, Virginia
- Mouth
  - location: Chesapeake Bay, Virginia
- Length: 34 mi (55 km)
- Discharge
  - location: Hanover, Virginia
  - average: 1,085 cu ft/s (30.7 m^{3}/s)

The York River is a navigable estuary, approximately 34 miles (55 km) long, in eastern Virginia in the United States. It ranges in width from 1 mile (1.6 km) at its head to 2.5 miles (4.0 km) near its mouth on the west side of the Chesapeake Bay. Its watershed drains an area of the coastal plain of Virginia north and east of Richmond.

Its banks were inhabited by indigenous peoples for thousands of years. In 2003, evidence was found of the likely site of Werowocomoco, one of two capitals used by the Mamanatowick Powhatan before 1609. The site was inhabited since 1200 as a major village. Enormously important in later U.S. history, the river was also the scene of early settlements of the Virginia Colony. It was the site of significant events and battles in both the American Revolutionary War and the American Civil War.

== Description ==
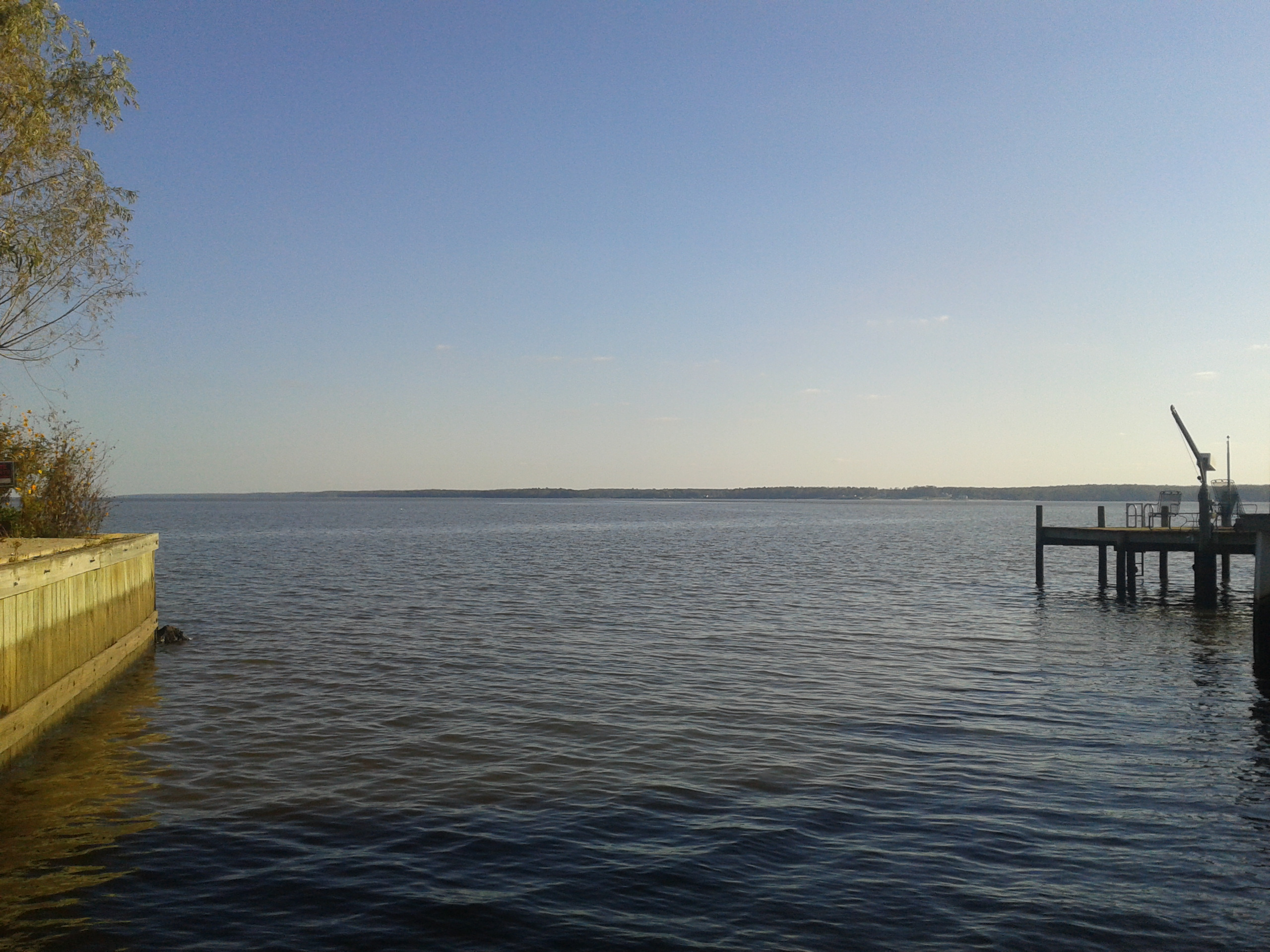
The confluence of the Mattaponi and Pamunkey Rivers in West Point, the site which marks the beginning of the York River

The York River is formed at West Point, approximately 35 miles (56 km) east of Richmond, by the confluence of the Mattaponi and Pamunkey rivers. It drains into the Chesapeake Bay towards the southeast, entering the bay approximately 5 miles (8 km) east of Yorktown, which sits along its southern shore. U.S. Highway 17 crosses the estuary from Yorktown to Gloucester Point on the George P. Coleman Memorial Bridge.

== History ==
The York River was formerly known as the Pamunkey River by the Native Americans. Colonists of the Virginia Company in the 17th century first called it the Charles River. On the north bank (the Middle Peninsula), in what is now Gloucester County, the leader, called the Mamanatowick, of the Powhatan Confederacy maintained Werowocomoco, one of two capitals of the Confederacy at the time of European contact before 1609. In 2002–2003, archeological evidence was found of an extensive ancient settlement on the York River at Purtan Bay. With excavations since then, researchers have concluded this is likely the site of Werowocomoco. They have found evidence of a large residential village inhabited since 1200 CE, with major earthworks constructed in 1400 CE, more than 200 years prior to the English colonists. In 2006 the Werowocomoco Archeological Site was listed on the National Register of Historic Places. Excavations continue by a team from the College of William and Mary, the Virginia Department of Natural History and representatives of Virginia descendant tribes of the Powhatan.

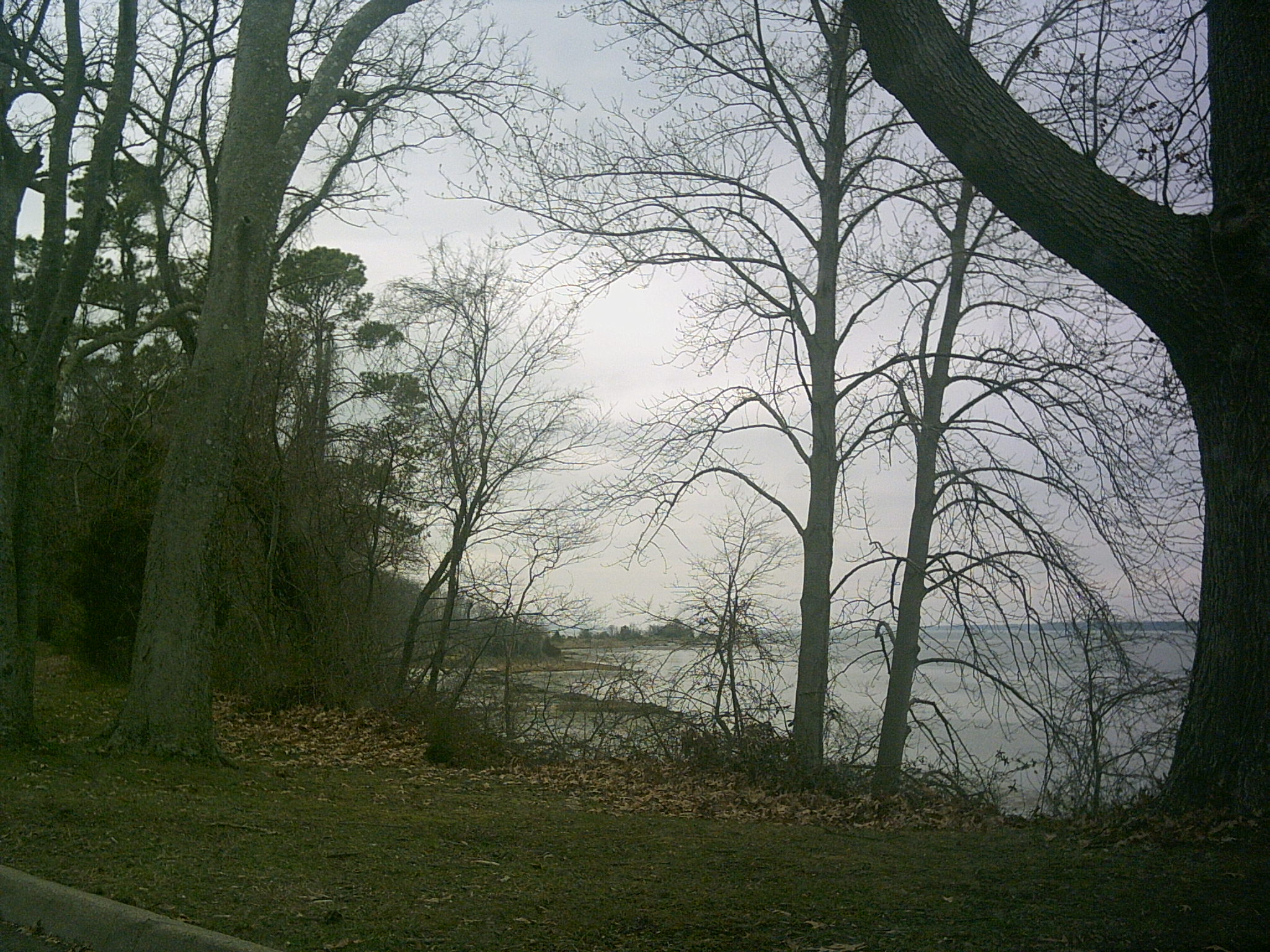
The banks of the York near Yorktown

The peninsula formed by the York and the James rivers just to the south became the scene of the end campaign of the American Revolutionary War in October 1781. The British Army under Cornwallis at Yorktown found itself cornered by the Americans under George Washington on land and by the French fleet at sea. The ensuing American victory at the Battle of Yorktown forced the surrender of Cornwallis and the end of the war in the east. During the American Civil War, the same area became the theater of the Peninsular Campaign of 1862.

York River State Park is located along the southern shore northwest of Yorktown in James City County. Also on the south shore are several large military reservations, including Camp Peary and the Naval Weapons Station Yorktown (and Cheatham Annex) of the U.S. Navy. Large areas of preserved wetlands and forest are considered ecologically important to migratory waterfowl. The National Park Service's Colonial Parkway provides a route through a portion of this natural area between Williamsburg and Yorktown.

== Crossing ==
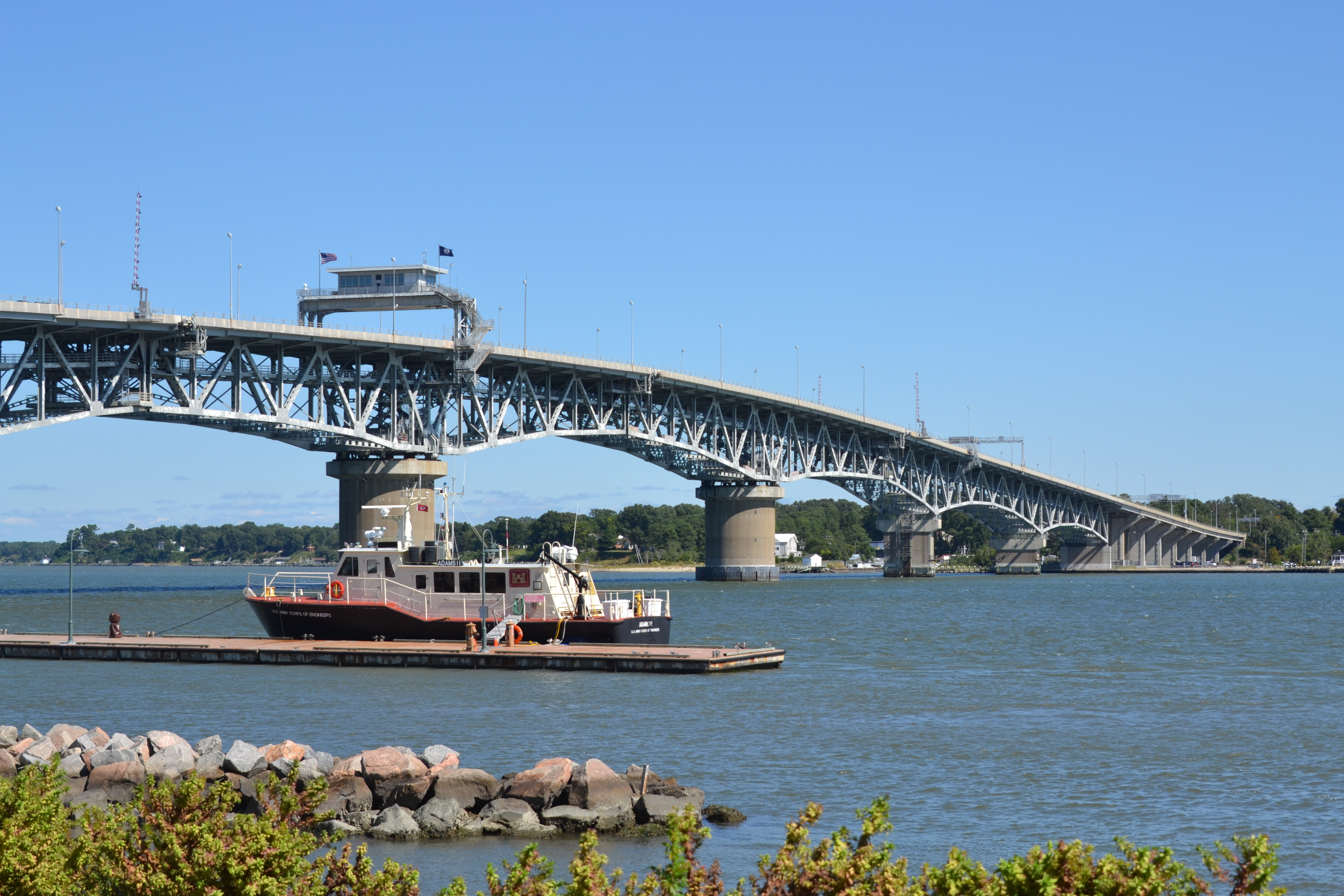
The George P. Coleman Bridge

The only vehicular crossing of the York River is the George P. Coleman Memorial Bridge, a swing-type drawbridge which carries U.S. Highway 17 between Yorktown and Gloucester Point. The facility operated as a toll bridge from 1952 until 1976, when the original bonds were paid off. After the bridge was rebuilt, tolls were added again from 1995 until 8:00 PM on Friday August 8th, 2025. Following a brief closure, the bridge reopened free to all traffic. The bridge has been one of the sites of a special program to establish and encourage nesting locations for the peregrine falcon population of Virginia.

== See also ==
- Tue Marshes Light
- List of Virginia rivers
