= List of United States tornadoes from July to October 2022 =

List of tornadoes in the United States

United States tornadoes from July to October 2022
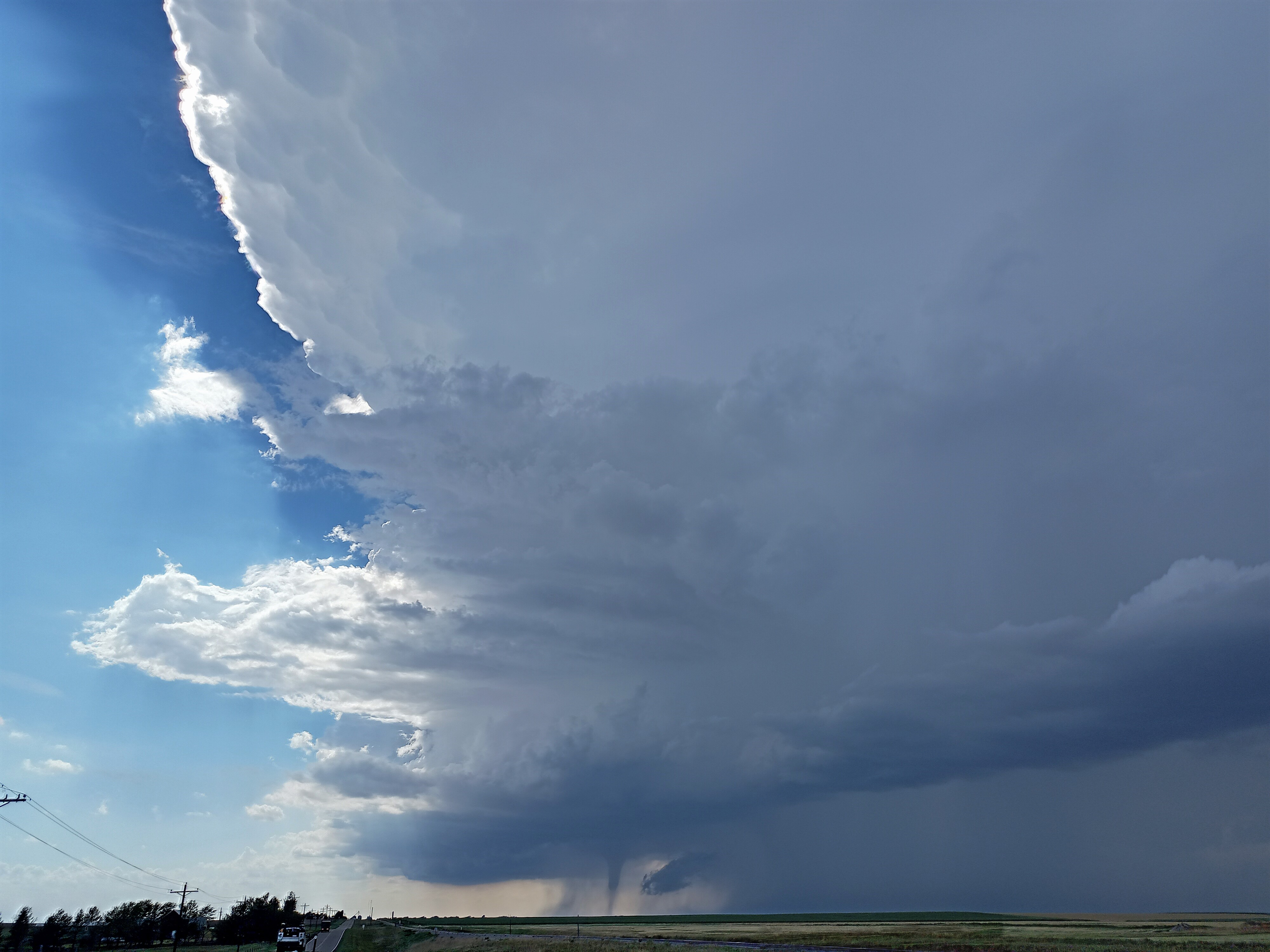
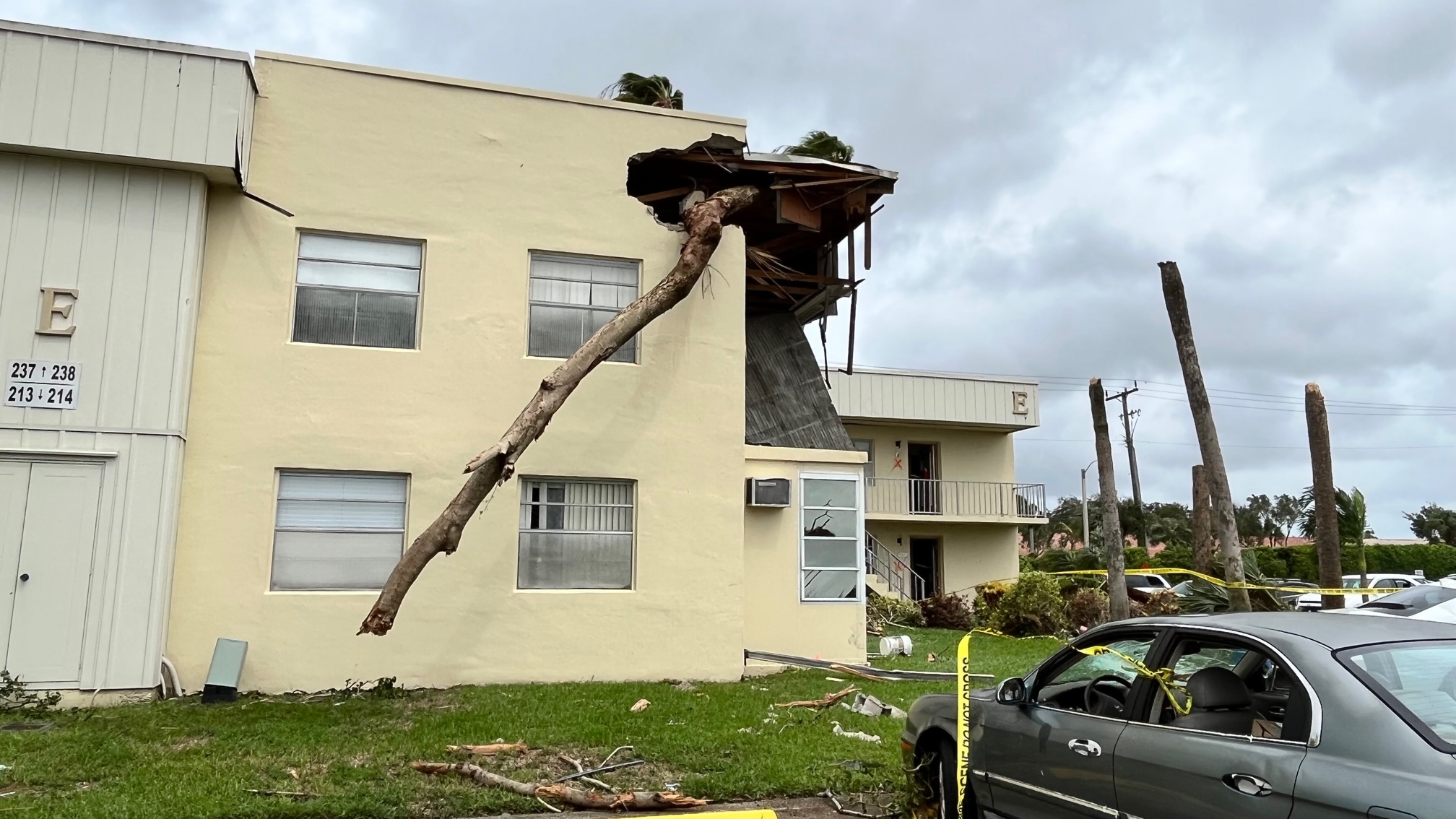
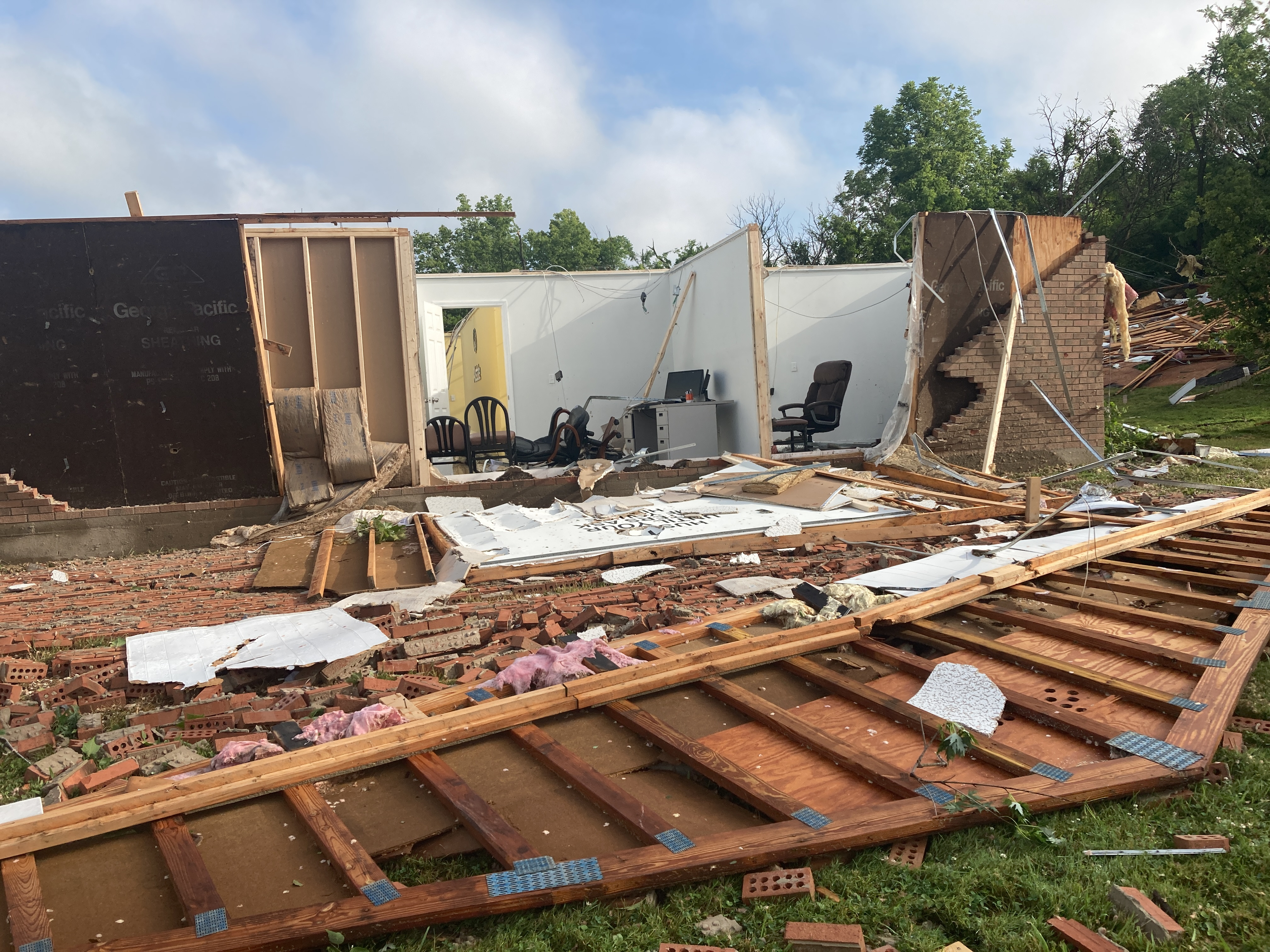
- Clockwise from top: An EFU tornado tracking over fields north of Stratton, Colorado on July 26; An insurance business after an EF2 tornado struck Goshen, Ohio on July 6; High-end EF2 damage to a residential building in Kings Point, Florida on September 27.
- Timespan: July 4 – October 30
- Maximum rated tornado: EF2 tornado: Goshen, Ohio on July 6; Glentana, Montana on July 18; Java, New York on July 28; Dallas, West Virginia on August 1; Ruso, North Dakota on August 15; Kings Point, Florida on September 27; Oberlin, Louisiana on October 25
- Tornadoes: 173
- Fatalities: 0
- Injuries: 8

This page documents all tornadoes confirmed by various weather forecast offices of the National Weather Service in the United States from July to October 2022. On average, there are 134 confirmed tornadoes in the United States in July, 83 in August, 74 in September, and 61 in October.

The summer and early fall months were very quiet in 2022, with only 173 tornadoes confirmed in the four-month period, less than half the average for the period. July and August were both significantly below average, with only 67 and 42 tornadoes being confirmed respectively. Unlike previous years, little to no tropical cyclone activity was present during this time, and no tropical tornadoes occurred as a result. September had 16 tropical tornadoes, which were produced by Hurricane Ian, but only nine other tornadoes touched down during the month, leaving it significantly below average with only 25 tornadoes. October was also well below average with only 39 tornadoes.

== United States yearly total ==
Confirmed tornadoes by Enhanced Fujita rating
EFU	EF0	EF1	EF2	EF3	EF4	EF5	Total
157	406	466	123	20	4	0	1,176

== July ==
Confirmed tornadoes by Enhanced Fujita rating
EFU	EF0	EF1	EF2	EF3	EF4	EF5	Total
22	25	17	3	0	0	0	67

=== July 4 event ===
List of confirmed tornadoes – Monday, July 4, 2022 (Note: All dates are based on the local time zone where the tornado touched down; however, all times are in Coordinated Universal Time for consistency.)
EF#	Location	County / Parish	State	Start Coord.	Time (UTC)	Path length	Max width
EF1	S of Grand Island to E of Lockwood	Hall, Merrick	NE	40.8661°N 98.3346°W	05:51–06:10	9.56 mi (15.39 km)	200 yd (180 m)
EF1	A high-end EF1 tornado tore a garage off a house, blew over a camper, uprooted trees, downed or snapped multiple power poles and lines, and flattened corn in a field.						

=== July 5 event ===
List of confirmed tornadoes – Tuesday, July 5, 2022
EF#	Location	County / Parish	State	Start Coord.	Time (UTC)	Path length	Max width
EF0	E of Water View to SE of Weems	Middlesex, Lancaster	VA	37.731°N 76.6°W	19:59–20:13	11.49 mi (18.49 km)	75 yd (69 m)
EF0	A tornado spent most of its life as a waterspout over the Rappahannock River and caused some minor damage as it reached land.						
EF1	Baywood	Grayson	VA	36.61°N 81.01°W	20:05–20:12	2.2 mi (3.5 km)	150 yd (140 m)
EF1	This tornado was embedded in a larger area of straight-line winds, and snapped or uprooted multiple trees.						
EF1	Bowie	Prince George's	MD	38.972°N 76.746°W	21:31–21:34	0.8 mi (1.3 km)	125 yd (114 m)
EF1	The tornado caused damage to trees and snapped several utility poles in the Bowie area.						
EFU	N of Harwood	Anne Arundel	MD	38.896°N 76.599°W	21:55–21:56	0.13 mi (0.21 km)	50 yd (46 m)
EFU	A brief tornado touched down in a field, causing no damage.						
EF0	ESE of Superior to NW of Estherville	Emmet	IA	43.4147°N 94.8919°W	22:37–22:42	1.63 mi (2.62 km)	80 yd (73 m)
EF0	Trees were downed, and roofs sustained minor damage.						
EFU	E of Fairbank	Buchanan	IA	42.6321°N 92.0128°W	01:44-01:46	1.37 mi (2.20 km)	20 yd (18 m)
EFU	A brief tornado in an open field caused no observable damage.						
EFU	NW of Winthrop	Buchanan	IA	42.4764°N 91.7577°W	02:00–02:01	0.68 mi (1.09 km)	20 yd (18 m)
EFU	A brief tornado touched down in open farm land, causing no damage.						

=== July 6 event ===
List of confirmed tornadoes – Wednesday, July 6, 2022
EF#	Location	County / Parish	State	Start Coord.	Time (UTC)	Path length	Max width
EF1	Southern Loveland	Clermont	OH	39.2387°N 84.2781°W	18:57–19:01	2.24 mi (3.60 km)	100 yd (91 m)
EF1	The tornado downed hundreds of trees, damaged fences, and inflicted roof and siding damage to a few homes in the southern part of Loveland.						
EF2	Goshen	Clermont	OH	39.2431°N 84.1829°W	19:05–19:13	4.81 mi (7.74 km)	500 yd (460 m)
EF2	A high-end EF2 tornado touched down in Goshen, where numerous homes were damaged and six had their roofs torn off, a few of which sustained damage to exterior walls. An insurance business completely lost its roof and multiple exterior walls, injuring a woman inside. The local fire station was heavily damaged and one firefighter sustained minor injuries, while a nearby one-story brick office building was largely destroyed, sustaining total loss of its roof and collapse of numerous walls. Goshen High School and Goshen Middle School had roof and siding damage, and a few other structures and businesses sustained minor damage. Vehicles were damaged by flying debris, many large trees and several power poles were snapped, and multiple outbuildings were destroyed in and around town. At least 150 structures were damaged in the Goshen area.						
EF1	WSW of Fayetteville	Brown	OH	39.1675°N 83.9993°W	19:17–19:21	3.34 mi (5.38 km)	250 yd (230 m)
EF1	This tornado snapped and uprooted trees, some of which fell on homes and vehicles. Several homes sustained damage to their roofs and porches as well.						
EF0	SSW of Stanford	Judith Basin	MT	47.0981°N 110.2759°W	19:18–19:22	1.26 mi (2.03 km)	50 yd (46 m)
EF0	A brief tornado was photographed and documented by a spotter. No damage occurred.						
EFU	ENE of Grover	Weld	CO	40.90°N 104.10°W	20:44–20:45	0.01 mi (0.016 km)	50 yd (46 m)
EFU	A landspout tornado occurred briefly in an open field, causing no damage.						
EF0	ENE of La Junta	Otero	CO	38.02°N 103.46°W	02:46–02:58	3.17 mi (5.10 km)	20 yd (18 m)
EF0	One house sustained minor structural damage.						

=== July 7 event ===
List of confirmed tornadoes – Thursday, July 7, 2022
EF#	Location	County / Parish	State	Start Coord.	Time (UTC)	Path length	Max width
EFU	S of Templeton	Carroll	IA	41.8705°N 94.951°W	19:32–19:34	0.36 mi (0.58 km)	20 yd (18 m)
EFU	A landspout tornado was photographed and posted to social media. No damage occurred.						
EFU	NE of Owasa	Hardin	IA	42.4824°N 93.1664°W	22:17–22:19	0.33 mi (0.53 km)	20 yd (18 m)
EFU	A tornado was photographed over rural farmland. No damage occurred.						
EF1	NE of Fort Morgan	Morgan	CO	40.3066°N 103.7356°W	22:39–22:42	0.62 mi (1.00 km)	100 yd (91 m)
EF1	A tornado knocked down several trees and power poles.						
EF0	NW of Brush	Morgan	CO	40.2972°N 103.6958°W	22:42–22:43	0.01 mi (0.016 km)	50 yd (46 m)
EF0	A tornado touched down briefly and caused minor damage.						
EF0	E of Fort Morgan	Morgan	CO	40.2464°N 103.7129°W	22:46–22:47	0.01 mi (0.016 km)	50 yd (46 m)
EF0	A tornado caused crop damage.						
EF1	W of Brush	Morgan	CO	40.2444°N 103.6884°W	22:49–22:50	0.01 mi (0.016 km)	50 yd (46 m)
EF1	A tornado touched down and snapped a utility pole.						
EF0	W of Brush	Morgan	CO	40.2473°N 103.6698°W	22:51–22:52	0.01 mi (0.016 km)	50 yd (46 m)
EF0	A brief tornado touched down and caused minor damage.						

=== July 8 event ===
List of confirmed tornadoes – Friday, July 8, 2022
EF#	Location	County / Parish	State	Start Coord.	Time (UTC)	Path length	Max width
EFU	N of Macomb	McDonough	IL	40.5127°N 90.6922°W	20:17–20:18	0.79 mi (1.27 km)	20 yd (18 m)
EFU	A brief tornado was spotted in an open field by a trained spotter with no damage being observed.						

=== July 9 event ===
List of confirmed tornadoes – Saturday, July 9, 2022
EF#	Location	County / Parish	State	Start Coord.	Time (UTC)	Path length	Max width
EF0	Edisto Beach	Colleton	SC	32.4898°N 80.3151°W	21:29–21:30	0.03 mi (0.048 km)	25 yd (23 m)
EF0	A waterspout moved onshore, tossing a section of metal roofing into power lines.						

=== July 11 event ===
List of confirmed tornadoes – Monday, July 11, 2022
EF#	Location	County / Parish	State	Start Coord.	Time (UTC)	Path length	Max width
EF0	N of Fenton to ENE of Holly	Genesee, Oakland	MI	42.8425°N 83.7125°W	03:33–03:42	7.43 mi (11.96 km)	40 yd (37 m)
EF0	Large tree limbs fell onto cars and roofs.						
EF1	Nemadji State Forest	Pine	MN	46.3647°N 92.4202°W	20:22–20:30	4.63 mi (7.45 km)	75 yd (69 m)
EF1	Numerous trees were snapped or uprooted.						

=== July 12 event ===
List of confirmed tornadoes – Tuesday, July 12, 2022
EF#	Location	County / Parish	State	Start Coord.	Time (UTC)	Path length	Max width
EF0	Glebe	Hampshire	WV	39.2504°N 78.8375°W	19:35–19:36	0.38 mi (0.61 km)	30 yd (27 m)
EF0	Several trees were snapped and a barn was destroyed. This was the first of two tornadoes embedded in a larger macroburst.						
EF1	Delray	Hampshire	WV	39.1785°N 78.6509°W	19:52–19:53	0.25 mi (0.40 km)	50 yd (46 m)
EF1	A second tornado embedded in a larger macroburst snapped and uprooted trees on a property.						

=== July 13 event ===
List of confirmed tornadoes – Wednesday, July 13, 2022
EF#	Location	County / Parish	State	Start Coord.	Time (UTC)	Path length	Max width
EFU	SSW of Grantsville	Tooele	UT	40.51°N 112.5°W	19:50-?	Unknown	Unknown
EFU	A landspout tornado touched down in a field and caused no visible damage.						
EF1	Hurley	Ulster	NY	41.9318°N 74.0532°W	00:49–00:51	0.52 mi (0.84 km)	300 yd (270 m)
EF1	A tornado uprooted and snapped trees, displaced a car canopy, and removed some shingles from a house. Many homes were damaged by falling trees.						

=== July 15 event ===
List of confirmed tornadoes – Friday, July 15, 2022
EF#	Location	County / Parish	State	Start Coord.	Time (UTC)	Path length	Max width
EFU	SW of Blair Junction	Esmeralda	NV	37.96°N 117.9°W	22:30	Unknown	Unknown
EFU	A landspout tornado was photographed.						

=== July 16 event ===
List of confirmed tornadoes – Saturday, July 16, 2022
EF#	Location	County / Parish	State	Start Coord.	Time (UTC)	Path length	Max width
EFU	NW of Ulen	Clay	MN	47.09°N 96.27°W	18:40–18:42	Unknown	Unknown
EFU	A landspout tornado produced no damage.						

=== July 17 event ===
List of confirmed tornadoes – Sunday, July 17, 2022
EF#	Location	County / Parish	State	Start Coord.	Time (UTC)	Path length	Max width
EF0	S of Circleville to S of Stoutsville	Pickaway, Fairfield	OH	39.545°N 82.9335°W	20:05–20:22	5.97 mi (9.61 km)	100 yd (91 m)
EF0	An RV was flipped on its side, injuring one person and a house had roof damage. Another property received minor damage. The tornado continued causing tree and minor damage. An outbuilding collapsed causing two injuries as well. Logan Elm School had several buildings receive minor damage to various portions of the sports complex. Additional tree damage continued as it entered and eventually dissipated in Fairfield County.						

=== July 18 event ===
List of confirmed tornadoes – Monday, July 18, 2022
EF#	Location	County / Parish	State	Start Coord.	Time (UTC)	Path length	Max width
EFU	SSW of Rhinecliff	Dutchess	NY	41.90°N 73.96°W	21:35	0.01 mi (0.016 km)	10 yd (9.1 m)
EFU	A waterspout was spotted on the Hudson River.						
EF1	Addison	Addison	VT	44.0828°N 73.3069°W	22:50–22:52	0.92 mi (1.48 km)	50 yd (46 m)
EF1	Trees were snapped and a barn was collapsed.						
EF0	SW of Vergennes	Addison	VT	44.1319°N 73.2723°W	22:55–22:57	0.68 mi (1.09 km)	25 yd (23 m)
EF0	Trees were damaged.						
EF2	SE of Opheim to NE of Glentana	Valley	MT	48.85°N 106.25°W	23:47–23:56	8 mi (13 km)	457 yd (418 m)
EF2	This tornado caused significant damage in Glentana. Glentana Hall had its metal roof peeled off, and a house had its roof torn off as well. An 8-ton grain truck was tipped over, two fuel tanks were toppled, and several empty grain bins were lifted off their foundations and were blown up to 0.5 mi (0.80 km) away. Garages and storage buildings were destroyed, and pieces of farm machinery were damaged. A pole barn was also destroyed, power poles were snapped, and trees were downed in town as well.						
EF1	N of Chesterfield	Cheshire	NH	42.9244°N 72.4543°W	04:22–04:26	0.36 mi (0.58 km)	250 yd (230 m)
EF1	A low-end EF1 tornado damaged approximately 200 trees and destroyed a few outbuildings.						

=== July 19 event ===
List of confirmed tornadoes – Tuesday, July 19, 2022
EF#	Location	County / Parish	State	Start Coord.	Time (UTC)	Path length	Max width
EF0	NE of Lancaster	Kittson	MN	48.8626°N 96.7817°W	18:38–18:42	1.56 mi (2.51 km)	40 yd (37 m)
EF0	An intermittent tornado snapped trees.						

=== July 20 event ===
List of confirmed tornadoes – Wednesday, July 20, 2022
EF#	Location	County / Parish	State	Start Coord.	Time (UTC)	Path length	Max width
EF1	S of Shreve	Wayne, Holmes	OH	40.67°N 82.0292°W	00:55-00:59	2.24 mi (3.60 km)	100 yd (91 m)
EF1	Two barns were destroyed, two other barns and a storage shelter sustained roof damage, and several trees were snapped or uprooted.						

=== July 22 event ===
List of confirmed tornadoes – Friday, July 22, 2022
EF#	Location	County / Parish	State	Start Coord.	Time (UTC)	Path length	Max width
EF0	Port Arthur	Jefferson	TX	29.839°N 93.938°W	16:25–16:29	1.68 mi (2.70 km)	10 yd (9.1 m)
EF0	A slow-moving waterspout on Sabine Lake moved ashore, knocking over some trash cans.						
EFU	NNE of Brewster	Thomas	KS	39.4641°N 101.3377°W	21:58–22:00	0.91 mi (1.46 km)	50 yd (46 m)
EFU	A landspout tornado was observed by a NWS employee. No damage occurred.						
EFU	NNE of Brewster	Thomas	KS	39.4854°N 101.3282°W	22:00–22:02	1.09 mi (1.75 km)	50 yd (46 m)
EFU	A landspout tornado was spotted by a NWS employee. No damage occurred.						
EFU	S of Brewster	Thomas	KS	39.255°N 101.3454°W	22:15–22:17	1.77 mi (2.85 km)	50 yd (46 m)
EFU	A landspout tornado was reported by a NWS employee. No damage occurred.						
EFU	S of Brewster	Thomas	KS	39.2388°N 101.3865°W	22:21–22:25	0.2 mi (0.32 km)	50 yd (46 m)
EFU	An off-duty NWS employee reported two brief, coincident landspouts, neither of which caused any damage. This one was the first landspout.						
EFU	S of Brewster	Thomas	KS	39.2382°N 101.3798°W	22:21–22:25	0.34 mi (0.55 km)	50 yd (46 m)
EFU	An off-duty NWS employee reported two brief, coincident landspouts, neither of which caused any damage. This one was the second landspout.						
EFU	SE of Brewster	Thomas	KS	39.2506°N 101.2953°W	22:28–22:33	0.74 mi (1.19 km)	50 yd (46 m)
EFU	An off-duty NWS employee reported a brief landspout. No damage occurred.						
EF0	Lake Weir	Marion	FL	28.9976°N 81.9427°W	23:38–23:42	1.35 mi (2.17 km)	50 yd (46 m)
EF0	A waterspout formed over Lake Weir and caused minor damage as it moved ashore.						

=== July 23 event ===
List of confirmed tornadoes – Saturday, July 23, 2022
EF#	Location	County / Parish	State	Start Coord.	Time (UTC)	Path length	Max width
EF0	ESE of Sharon	Steele	ND	47.56°N 97.76°W	05:17–05:18	0.92 mi (1.48 km)	150 yd (140 m)
EF0	Trees in shelter belts were snapped.						
EF1	N of Hatton	Grand Forks	ND	47.71°N 97.46°W	05:31–05:32	1.18 mi (1.90 km)	150 yd (140 m)
EF1	Stacked irrigation pipes were tossed and an empty grain bin was destroyed, with debris scattered for half a mile (0.8 km).						
EF0	N of Plainfield to Southwestern Naperville	DuPage, Will	IL	41.726°N 88.2207°W	10:40–10:46	4.5 mi (7.2 km)	150 yd (140 m)
EF0	A high-end EF0 tornado removed a small amount of roof covering an apartment building, caused minor roof damage to several buildings, and damaged the grounds of the White Eagle Golf Course. Trees were uprooted and tree limbs were downed along the path as well, including some that damaged fences.						
EF0	Lewis University Airport to N of Joliet	Will	IL	41.6027°N 88.1133°W	10:52–10:58	4.1 mi (6.6 km)	200 yd (180 m)
EF0	The same storm that spawned the above tornado quickly produced this weak tornado that passed east of Crest Hill, damaging trees and knocking down tree limbs.						
EF0	NNW of Manhattan	Will	IL	41.4563°N 88.0035°W	11:05–11:06	0.7 mi (1.1 km)	150 yd (140 m)
EF0	The same storm that produced the above tornadoes produced a third weak, brief tornado that moved along US 52. A tree was uprooted, tree limbs were blown down, and a metal road sign was blown over.						
EF1	Troy	Miami	OH	40.0421°N 84.23°W	14:45–14:48	1.8 mi (2.9 km)	200 yd (180 m)
EF1	This tornado was embedded in a larger area of straight-line winds and downed numerous large trees in Troy, with one trunk snapped at its base, and several large branches snapped not far off the ground. One tree landed on and severely damaged a car, and a bank sign was damaged as well. A couple homes also had some minor roof damage. The tornado was not visible on radar, and no tornado warning was issued.						
EF0	SSE of Fremont	Winona	MN	43.8605°N 91.8798°W	19:41–19:43	1.25 mi (2.01 km)	30 yd (27 m)
EF0	A brief, weak tornado damaged some trees.						
EF0	N of Houston	Houston	MN	43.7967°N 91.6015°W	20:01–20:06	4.21 mi (6.78 km)	40 yd (37 m)
EF0	An intermittent, weak tornado damaged a barn and patches of trees and crops.						
EF0	ESE of Onalaska to NW of Barre Mills	La Crosse	WI	43.8689°N 91.1746°W	20:33–20:36	2.49 mi (4.01 km)	40 yd (37 m)
EF0	A brief, weak tornado damaged some trees as it moved through a nature preserve.						
EF1	W of Waukon	Allamakee	IA	43.2628°N 91.5287°W	04:44-04:46	1.46 mi (2.35 km)	90 yd (82 m)
EF1	A tornado damaged the roofs of farm outbuildings, along with some trees. This was the first tornado in Allamakee County in over 20 years.						

=== July 26 event ===
List of confirmed tornadoes – Tuesday, July 26, 2022
EF#	Location	County / Parish	State	Start Coord.	Time (UTC)	Path length	Max width
EFU	SE of Kirk	Kit Carson	CO	39.5484°N 102.4473°W	21:48–21:51	0.77 mi (1.24 km)	50 yd (46 m)
EFU	A brief landspout tornado produced no damage.						
EFU	N of Stratton	Kit Carson	CO	39.4036°N 102.5508°W	21:51–21:54	0.5 mi (0.80 km)	75 yd (69 m)
EFU	A brief landspout tornado produced no damage.						
EF0	NW of Vona to E of Seibert	Kit Carson	CO	39.3067°N 102.7587°W	22:29–22:42	3.34 mi (5.38 km)	100 yd (91 m)
EF0	An unanchored garage was shifted 6 in (15 cm) off its foundation. A communications tower next to the garage folded in half, and metal roofing and siding on the garage were damaged. A propane tank was slightly rolled, a playground set was torn apart, and a trampoline was crumpled. Before dissipating, the tornado crossed I-70.						
EFU	NW of Stratton	Kit Carson	CO	39.3819°N 102.6258°W	23:02–23:16	1.61 mi (2.59 km)	100 yd (91 m)
EFU	The tornado moved over open land, causing no damage.						

=== July 28 event ===
List of confirmed tornadoes – Thursday, July 28, 2022
EF#	Location	County / Parish	State	Start Coord.	Time (UTC)	Path length	Max width
EF2	SE of Java to N of Gainesville	Wyoming	NY	42.62°N 78.33°W	14:40–14:55	10 mi (16 km)	500 yd (460 m)
EF2	Outbuildings and barns were damaged or destroyed at the beginning of the path, including a large barn that was significantly damaged, with a portion of the structure being displaced up to 30 yd (27 m) away. A house in this area sustained shingle damage as well. Significant tree damage occurred in a wooded area, where a large swath of trees was flattened. Some trees landed on homes and caused structural damage, and many power lines were downed as well.						
EF0	S of Norfolk to SW of Colebrook	Litchfield	CT	41.9281°N 73.2078°W	22:35–22:45	5 mi (8.0 km)	300 yd (270 m)
EF0	A weak tornado that was spotted by several eyewitnesses ripped some siding off a couple of barns while also tearing the door off one of them. Trees were knocked down and tree branches were snapped sporadically along the path as well.						
EF1	Broken Arrow	Tulsa, Wagoner	OK	36.056°N 95.779°W	03:35–03:44	4 mi (6.4 km)	800 yd (730 m)
EF1	A small outbuilding and several homes were damaged. Trees were snapped or uprooted along the path.						

=== July 29 event ===
List of confirmed tornadoes – Friday, July 29, 2022
EF#	Location	County / Parish	State	Start Coord.	Time (UTC)	Path length	Max width
EFU	N of Buckley Space Force Base	Arapahoe	CO	39.74°N 104.74°W	22:25–22:26	0.01 mi (0.016 km)	50 yd (46 m)
EFU	A brief landspout tornado produced no reported damage.						
EFU	ENE of Commerce City	Adams	CO	39.84°N 104.82°W	22:36–22:37	0.01 mi (0.016 km)	50 yd (46 m)
EFU	A landspout tornado produced no reported damage.						

=== July 31 event ===
List of confirmed tornadoes – Sunday, July 31, 2022
EF#	Location	County / Parish	State	Start Coord.	Time (UTC)	Path length	Max width
EF0	NW of Alden	Freeborn	MN	43.7162°N 93.6339°W	01:28-01:29	0.46 mi (0.74 km)	25 yd (23 m)
EF0	A brief tornado broke several large branches and partially ripped soffits off of a home. A storm chaser caught video of the tornado.						

== August ==
Confirmed tornadoes by Enhanced Fujita rating
EFU	EF0	EF1	EF2	EF3	EF4	EF5	Total
17	19	4	2	0	0	0	42

=== August 1 event ===
List of confirmed tornadoes – Monday, August 1, 2022
EF#	Location	County / Parish	State	Start Coord.	Time (UTC)	Path length	Max width
EF0	N of Mason City	Mason	IL	40.2497°N 89.6847°W	09:46-09:48	0.41 mi (0.66 km)	60 yd (55 m)
EF0	A tornado flipped an empty trailer hopper and damaging a tractor before quickly dissipating.						
EF1	Beason	Logan	IL	40.1441°N 89.1966°W	10:12–10:15	1.88 mi (3.03 km)	60 yd (55 m)
EF1	A tornado embedded within a squall line struck a large grain elevator in Beason, damaging some large bins and equipment, large trees, and some powerlines. A few homes in town sustained minor shingle damage, one of which had a broken window.						
EF0	NE of Vassar	Tuscola	MI	43.393°N 83.526°W	17:56–18:03	2.35 mi (3.78 km)	200 yd (180 m)
EF0	Emergency management reported numerous uprooted trees.						
EF0	S of Caro	Tuscola	MI	43.409°N 83.389°W	18:14-18:16	0.41 mi (0.66 km)	100 yd (91 m)
EF0	Emergency management reported several trees blocking an intersection.						
EF2	Dallas, WV	Ohio (WV), Washington (PA)	WV, PA	40.03°N 80.54°W	23:05–23:09	1.22 mi (1.96 km)	350 yd (320 m)
EF2	A barn, a shed, and a camper were destroyed, a 160-year-old barn lost its roof, and a church parsonage sustained major roof damage from this low-end EF2 tornado. Numerous large trees were snapped or downed as well. This was the first tornado to affect Ohio County since 1977.						
EF0	WNW of Rogersville	Greene	PA	39.9206°N 80.3382°W	23:35–23:41	1.19 mi (1.92 km)	150 yd (140 m)
EF0	This high-end EF0 tornado was spawned by the same storm that produced the previous tornado. A barn completely collapsed, a camper was overturned, a home lost some of its siding and numerous trees were uprooted.						

=== August 4 event ===
List of confirmed tornadoes – Thursday, August 4, 2022
EF#	Location	County / Parish	State	Start Coord.	Time (UTC)	Path length	Max width
EFU	North Naples	Collier	FL	26.22°N 81.82°W	18:55–?	Unknown	Unknown
EFU	A waterspout moved onshore becoming a landspout that lofted some sand.						
EF1	Rhodes Point to Ewell	Somerset	MD	37.9695°N 76.0467°W	23:20–23:27	2.3 mi (3.7 km)	100 yd (91 m)
EF1	A waterspout formed offshore of Smith Island and moved onshore, crossing over the northwestern portion of the island as a high-end EF1 tornado. Several outbuildings and a mobile home were destroyed, a bed and breakfast had its roof completely removed, and power poles were snapped. Other homes suffered minor damage, tree branches were snapped, a tall baseball field chain link fence was bent over, and a golf cart was blown into a creek. The tornado then moved back into the Chesapeake Bay. One person was injured.						

=== August 5 event ===
List of confirmed tornadoes – Friday, August 5, 2022
EF#	Location	County / Parish	State	Start Coord.	Time (UTC)	Path length	Max width
EFU	West Valley City	Salt Lake	UT	40.71°N 112.04°W	17:26–17:34	Unknown	Unknown
EFU	A landspout was observed on the northwest side of West Valley City. No damage was reported.						
EFU	NE of Denver International Airport	Denver	CO	39.9°N 104.71°W	21:43–21:50	0.01 mi (0.016 km)	25 yd (23 m)
EFU	A brief landspout tornado produced no damage in an open field.						

=== August 8 event ===
List of confirmed tornadoes – Monday, August 8, 2022
EF#	Location	County / Parish	State	Start Coord.	Time (UTC)	Path length	Max width
EFU	SE of Punta Gorda	Charlotte	FL	26.9°N 82.01°W	21:00-21:01	0.05 mi (0.080 km)	25 yd (23 m)
EFU	Broadcast media showed a video of a weak landspout tornado occurring.						
EF0	E of Dumas	Moore	TX	35.87°N 101.94°W	23:49–23:55	1.38 mi (2.22 km)	40 yd (37 m)
EF0	A high-end EF0 landspout tornado destroyed a poorly constructed building, tore part of the roof from a mobile home, caused minor damage to another mobile home, and damaged outbuildings.						

=== August 11 event ===
List of confirmed tornadoes – Thursday, August 11, 2022
EF#	Location	County / Parish	State	Start Coord.	Time (UTC)	Path length	Max width
EFU	SW of St. George	Washington	UT	37.07°N 113.63°W	22:50	Unknown	Unknown
EFU	A landspout was videoed and posted to social media.						

=== August 15 event ===
List of confirmed tornadoes – Monday, August 15, 2022
EF#	Location	County / Parish	State	Start Coord.	Time (UTC)	Path length	Max width
EF0	Southern Moore	Frio	TX	29.0497°N 99.0062°W	17:35-17:36	0.21 mi (0.34 km)	100 yd (91 m)
EF0	A weak and brief tornado formed doing slight roof damage and blowing a fence down. This was the first tornado to occur in Frio County since 2002.						
EFU	E of Ruso	McLean	ND	47.84°N 100.85°W	22:08–22:09	0.35 mi (0.56 km)	25 yd (23 m)
EFU	First of three tornadoes in this Ruso tornado family. This tornado touched down in an open field impacting no structures.						
EF1	S of Ruso	McLean	ND	47.81°N 100.93°W	22:10–22:35	2.24 mi (3.60 km)	100 yd (91 m)
EF1	Second of three tornadoes produced in this Ruso tornado family. Hardwood trees were snapped and an animal shelter was destroyed shortly after the tornado formed.						
EF2	S of Ruso	McLean	ND	47.7564°N 100.9677°W	22:30–22:50	2.27 mi (3.65 km)	100 yd (91 m)
EF2	Third and final tornado produced in this Ruso tornado family. Shortly after forming, the tornado destroyed small wooden granaries, flipped a seed cart and anhydrous ammonia tanks. The tornado also tossed multiple hay bales.						
EFU	SSE of Cheyenne Wells	Cheyenne	CO	38.76°N 102.33°W	23:41–?	Unknown	Unknown
EFU	A brief landspout was observed by a storm chaser.						

=== August 17 event ===
List of confirmed tornadoes – Wednesday, August 17, 2022
EF#	Location	County / Parish	State	Start Coord.	Time (UTC)	Path length	Max width
EFU	Henderson	Clark	NV	36.06°N 114.97°W	23:16	Unknown	Unknown
EFU	A weak landspout tornado formed along the outskirts of Henderson, and was confirmed from an amateur photograph. No known damage occurred.						

=== August 18 event ===
List of confirmed tornadoes – Thursday, August 18, 2022
EF#	Location	County / Parish	State	Start Coord.	Time (UTC)	Path length	Max width
EF0	S of Sabine National Wildlife Refuge	Cameron	LA	29.81°N 93.66°W	18:20–18:25	1.18 mi (1.90 km)	10 yd (9.1 m)
EF0	A landspout tornado occurred in an oil field.						

=== August 20 event ===
List of confirmed tornadoes – Saturday, August 20, 2022
EF#	Location	County / Parish	State	Start Coord.	Time (UTC)	Path length	Max width
EFU	NW of Scotch Grove	Jones	IA	42.178°N 91.1102°W	17:20–17:21	0.15 mi (0.24 km)	10 yd (9.1 m)
EFU	A mini supercell produced funnel clouds, one of which touched down. Some crop damage was reported.						
EFU	SSE of Mannon	Mercer	IL	41.1993°N 90.939°W	18:17–18:18	0.27 mi (0.43 km)	10 yd (9.1 m)
EFU	A funnel lasted for two minutes and briefly touched down. No known damage occurred.						
EFU	E of Aledo	Mercer	IL	41.21°N 90.74°W	18:55–19:05	2.83 mi (4.55 km)	10 yd (9.1 m)
EFU	A sporadic tornado was captured in photographs and video. Minor crop damage was reported, though the National Weather Service survey team saw “no observable damage to assess”.						
EF0	NNW of Winchester	Randolph	IN	40.2224°N 84.9967°W	19:29–19:33	1.71 mi (2.75 km)	20 yd (18 m)
EF0	A brief landspout damaged the roof and metal exterior of an outbuilding, with parts of the roof being carried away.						

=== August 21 event ===
List of confirmed tornadoes – Sunday, August 21, 2022
EF#	Location	County / Parish	State	Start Coord.	Time (UTC)	Path length	Max width
EFU	SE of Littlefield	Mohave	AZ	36.67°N 113.64°W	23:38–23:43	0.01 mi (0.016 km)	50 yd (46 m)
EFU	No known damage occurred as a result of this tornado. The National Weather Service of Las Vegas originally estimated this tornado to have been EF0 intensity, but it was later downgraded to EFU.						

=== August 22 event ===
List of confirmed tornadoes – Monday, August 22, 2022
EF#	Location	County / Parish	State	Start Coord.	Time (UTC)	Path length	Max width
EF1	W of Winona	Smith	TX	32.4873°N 95.1918°W	15:26–15:30	3.78 mi (6.08 km)	200 yd (180 m)
EF1	A small metal outbuilding was thrown across a road. The roof of a dugout was damaged as the tornado crossed a football field, missing Winona Middle School by only 200 yd (180 m). Another metal outbuilding was rolled and destroyed. Trees were snapped or uprooted, one of which fell onto a home.						

=== August 23 event ===
List of confirmed tornadoes – Tuesday, August 23, 2022
EF#	Location	County / Parish	State	Start Coord.	Time (UTC)	Path length	Max width
EFU	W of Driscoll	Nueces	TX	27.67°N 97.85°W	00:11	0.05 mi (0.080 km)	20 yd (18 m)
EFU	Multiple photos were received of a very brief and weak tornado occurring.						

=== August 24 event ===
List of confirmed tornadoes – Wednesday, August 24, 2022
EF#	Location	County / Parish	State	Start Coord.	Time (UTC)	Path length	Max width
EF0	WNW of West Hattiesburg	Lamar	MS	31.3267°N 89.4079°W	18:04	0.29 mi (0.47 km)	25 yd (23 m)
EF0	A golf course employee witnessed debris briefly being lofted. No other damage was found.						

=== August 25 event ===
List of confirmed tornadoes – Thursday, August 25, 2022
EF#	Location	County / Parish	State	Start Coord.	Time (UTC)	Path length	Max width
EFU	N of Edsroy	San Patricio	TX	28.03°N 97.69°W	16:18	0.05 mi (0.080 km)	20 yd (18 m)
EFU	The public recorded a video of a brief weak tornado in an open field.						
EF0	SW of Littletown	Pima	AZ	32.12°N 110.88°W	23:00–23:02	0.05 mi (0.080 km)	10 yd (9.1 m)
EF0	Members of the public observed a brief landspout tornado.						

=== August 26 event ===
List of confirmed tornadoes – Friday, August 26, 2022
EF#	Location	County / Parish	State	Start Coord.	Time (UTC)	Path length	Max width
EF0	ENE of Cleveland	Blaine	MT	48.3058°N 108.9603°W	18:18–18:29	3.06 mi (4.92 km)	50 yd (46 m)
EF0	A tornado was photographed by a tribal official; no known damage occurred.						
EF0	Prien Lake	Calcasieu	LA	30.185°N 93.2869°W	21:24–21:25	0.25 mi (0.40 km)	10 yd (9.1 m)
EF0	A waterspout developed over Prien Lake and drifted to the shoreline.						

=== August 27 event ===
List of confirmed tornadoes – Saturday, August 27, 2022
EF#	Location	County / Parish	State	Start Coord.	Time (UTC)	Path length	Max width
EF0	Crystal Lake	Dakota	MN	44.7152°N 93.2642°W	01:36–01:38	0.85 mi (1.37 km)	100 yd (91 m)
EF0	Trees were snapped or uprooted in and several homes sustained roof damage.						
EF0	Northern Apple Valley	Dakota	MN	44.7636°N 93.2156°W	01:40–01:42	0.37 mi (0.60 km)	100 yd (91 m)
EF0	A high-end EF0 tornado snapped or uprooted trees.						
EF0	Eagan	Dakota	MN	44.8248°N 93.1569°W	01:47–01:49	0.75 mi (1.21 km)	150 yd (140 m)
EF0	A brief, weak tornado snapped and uprooted trees.						
EF0	West St. Paul	Dakota	MN	44.9018°N 93.07°W	01:55–01:57	0.26 mi (0.42 km)	50 yd (46 m)
EF0	A weak tornado briefly touched down snapping or uprooting some trees.						
EF0	Eastern St. Paul	Ramsey	MN	44.9467°N 93.035°W	01:59–02:04	3.46 mi (5.57 km)	100 yd (91 m)
EF0	A weak tornado caused minor property damage and downed trees, one of which landed on a car.						

=== August 28 event ===
List of confirmed tornadoes – Sunday, August 28, 2022
EF#	Location	County / Parish	State	Start Coord.	Time (UTC)	Path length	Max width
EFU	N of Desert Center	Riverside	CA	33.7463°N 115.3909°W	21:35–21:40	0.17 mi (0.27 km)	50 yd (46 m)
EFU	A nearly stationary landspout caused no damage.						
EF0	SW of Prinsburg	Chippewa, Kandiyohi	MN	44.9004°N 95.261°W	01:05–01:08	0.86 mi (1.38 km)	25 yd (23 m)
EF0	A brief tornado took down large tree branches before entering a corn field where it dissipated.						

=== August 29 event ===
List of confirmed tornadoes – Monday, August 29, 2022
EF#	Location	County / Parish	State	Start Coord.	Time (UTC)	Path length	Max width
EF0	NW of Spearville	Ford	KS	37.8666°N 99.7894°W	20:29-20:35	1.72 mi (2.77 km)	30 yd (27 m)
EF0	A storm chaser video taped a landspout. No known damage occurred.						

=== August 31 event ===
List of confirmed tornadoes – Wednesday, August 31, 2022
EF#	Location	County / Parish	State	Start Coord.	Time (UTC)	Path length	Max width
EFU	NE of Hale, CO	Cheyenne	KS	39.68°N 102.05°W	20:29	Unknown	Unknown
EFU	NWS employees observed a landspout.						
EFU	SSE of St. Francis	Cheyenne	KS	39.68°N 101.77°W	20:58	Unknown	Unknown
EFU	An off-duty deputy reported a landspout tornado.						

== September ==
Confirmed tornadoes by Enhanced Fujita rating
EFU	EF0	EF1	EF2	EF3	EF4	EF5	Total
5	14	5	1	0	0	0	25

=== September 4 event ===
List of confirmed tornadoes – Sunday, September 4, 2022
EF#	Location	County / Parish	State	Start Coord.	Time (UTC)	Path length	Max width
EF0	Boardman	Mahoning	OH	41.021°N 80.6559°W	21:35-21:44	0.07 mi (0.11 km)	15 yd (14 m)
EF0	A brief tornado hit a small strip mall building, ripping an awning off the front and a small portion of the roof from the building. The tornado also caused minor tree limb damage and blew down a small wooden fence.						

=== September 10 event ===
List of confirmed tornadoes – Saturday, September 10, 2022
EF#	Location	County / Parish	State	Start Coord.	Time (UTC)	Path length	Max width
EF0	Whitehall Terrace	Charleston	SC	32.875°N 79.7514°W	05:21–05:23	0.68 mi (1.09 km)	125 yd (114 m)
EF0	A brief, weak tornado damaged the roof a public works building. A house sustained a broken window, and a nearby fence was downed along US 17. Small trees were also downed or snapped as well.						

=== September 13 event ===
List of confirmed tornadoes – Tuesday, September 13, 2022
EF#	Location	County / Parish	State	Start Coord.	Time (UTC)	Path length	Max width
EF0	N of Joseph City	Navajo	AZ	34.96°N 110.33°W	18:00–18:07	0.1 mi (0.16 km)	10 yd (9.1 m)
EF0	A landspout tornado lofted dust.						
EF0	NW of Dinnehotso	Apache	AZ	36.84°N 109.85°W	00:45–00:50	7.71 mi (12.41 km)	10 yd (9.1 m)
EF0	A tornado formed along a thunderstorm's outflow boundary.						

=== September 18 event ===
List of confirmed tornadoes – Sunday, September 18, 2022
EF#	Location	County / Parish	State	Start Coord.	Time (UTC)	Path length	Max width
EF0	Le Roy	McLean	IL	40.34°N 88.77°W	05:28–05:34	2.97 mi (4.78 km)	30 yd (27 m)
EF0	A tornado touched down in Le Roy, knocking a power pole into a mobile home and a tree into another mobile home. The tornado caused minor tree damage and partial roof damage at two duplexes. Two semi-trucks were overturned as well.						

=== September 19 event ===
List of confirmed tornadoes – Monday, September 19, 2022
EF#	Location	County / Parish	State	Start Coord.	Time (UTC)	Path length	Max width
EF1	Wayland	Steuben	NY	42.575°N 77.614°W	23:33–23:38	1.85 mi (2.98 km)	150 yd (140 m)
EF1	Homes in town sustained roof damage, and fencing was blown over. Trees and tree limbs were downed, and a truck and a trailer were also damaged.						

=== September 22 event ===
List of confirmed tornadoes – Thursday, September 22, 2022
EF#	Location	County / Parish	State	Start Coord.	Time (UTC)	Path length	Max width
EFU	N of Lake Valley	San Juan	NM	36.24°N 108.18°W	19:03–19:05	0.1 mi (0.16 km)	20 yd (18 m)
EFU	A brief landspout tornado caused no damage.						

=== September 25 event ===
List of confirmed tornadoes – Sunday, September 25, 2022
EF#	Location	County / Parish	State	Start Coord.	Time (UTC)	Path length	Max width
EF1	S of Walton	Delaware	NY	42.1518°N 75.1843°W	22:38-22:41	2.29 mi (3.69 km)	150 yd (140 m)
EF1	Metal sheeting was ripped off the roof of an automotive repair shop, and many large trees were snapped or uprooted.						
EF0	NW of Laurel	Suffolk	NY	40.9837°N 72.5624°W	03:17–03:20	2.1 mi (3.4 km)	75 yd (69 m)
EF0	A tornado along an intermittent track damaged trees, the roofs and siding of homes, and a greenhouse. The Mattituck-Cutchogue middle and high school track had its large scoreboard twisted and damaged, metal benches overturned, and about 100 feet (30 m) of its wind fence flattened. At the high school in particular, large sections of asphalt roofing was torn from one of the main buildings.						

=== September 27 event ===
List of confirmed tornadoes – Tuesday, September 27, 2022
EF#	Location	County / Parish	State	Start Coord.	Time (UTC)	Path length	Max width
EFU	W of Sweetwater	Miami-Dade	FL	25.8°N 80.72°W	19:48–19:58	5.18 mi (8.34 km)	100 yd (91 m)
EFU	A tornado was confirmed using a debris signature on radar.						
EFU	W of Pinecrest	Monroe	FL	25.75°N 80.99°W	21:10	0.02 mi (0.032 km)	50 yd (46 m)
EFU	A tornado was confirmed using a debris signature on radar.						
EF0	E of Sweetwater	Miami-Dade	FL	25.7711°N 80.3354°W	22:13	0.1 mi (0.16 km)	50 yd (46 m)
EF0	Some tree damage was photographed.						
EF0	SW of Medley	Miami-Dade	FL	25.8075°N 80.3511°W	22:22	0.15 mi (0.24 km)	50 yd (46 m)
EF0	Several trees were severely damaged.						
EF1	Pembroke Pines to Cooper City	Broward	FL	25.9952°N 80.2386°W	23:17–23:25	5.73 mi (9.22 km)	150 yd (140 m)
EF1	This tornado first developed over the North Perry Airport, damaging 50 ft (15 m) of fencing, 20 aircraft, hangars, and various structures. The tornado produced less severe damage to signage, roofing, and trees elsewhere. Glass sliding doors were dislodged, and a Publix store was damaged as well.						
EF0	Hollywood to Davie	Broward	FL	26.0047°N 80.192°W	23:51–00:07	7.44 mi (11.97 km)	75 yd (69 m)
EF0	A tornado downed trees and large branches along its path.						
EF2	Boca Raton to Kings Point	Palm Beach	FL	26.3705°N 80.1054°W	00:59–01:17	6.98 mi (11.23 km)	200 yd (180 m)
EF2	This tornado first touched down at Florida Atlantic University, tearing siding from buildings there. The tornado caused minor damage to trees and fencing in Delray Beach before reaching high-end EF2 strength in Kings Point. A two-story apartment building in Kings Point had its roof torn off, and nearby apartment buildings had large parts of their roofs removed. Palm trees were snapped in half, trees and tree branches were snapped and thrown into buildings, and vehicles were flipped and severely damaged. Other homes and apartment buildings had varying degrees of roof and window damage, and some sustained damage to screened-in patios. Two people were injured in Kings Point as a roof collapsed.						
EF1	Wellington to Loxahatchee	Palm Beach	FL	26.6449°N 80.2878°W	01:22–01:30	7.48 mi (12.04 km)	150 yd (140 m)
EF1	At least two dozen homes sustained roof damage. Fences and trees were snapped or damaged as well.						
EF1	N of Loxahatchee	Palm Beach	FL	26.7338°N 80.3355°W	01:30–01:36	1.39 mi (2.24 km)	100 yd (91 m)
EF1	An EF1 tornado occurred around the same time as the previous one, causing damage to trees, and the roofs of a house and a stable.						
EFU	NW of Miramar	Broward	FL	26.26°N 80.61°W	04:40–04:42	2.83 mi (4.55 km)	100 yd (91 m)
EFU	A tornado debris signature on radar was used to identify a brief tornado.						

=== September 28 event ===
List of confirmed tornadoes – Wednesday, September 28, 2022
EF#	Location	County / Parish	State	Start Coord.	Time (UTC)	Path length	Max width
EF0	WNW of Davie	Broward	FL	26.1123°N 80.3297°W	05:31–05:32	0.06 mi (0.097 km)	50 yd (46 m)
EF0	Siding, gutters, awnings, and trees were damaged in a manufactured home community.						
EF0	Moore Haven	Glades	FL	26.827°N 81.0781°W	06:25–06:33	1.09 mi (1.75 km)	75 yd (69 m)
EF0	A high-end EF0 tornado knocked over a pair of trailers and damaged paneling and siding. Trees were damaged as well.						
EF0	Boynton Beach	Palm Beach	FL	26.5282°N 80.068°W	09:56	0.2 mi (0.32 km)	50 yd (46 m)
EF0	This tornado damaged decorative items and felled trees.						
EF0	WNW of June Park	Brevard, Osceola	FL	28.083°N 80.8669°W	19:32–19:46	3 mi (4.8 km)	100 yd (91 m)
EF0	Trees and vegetation sustained minimal damage. The Storm Prediction Center documented that this tornado was the only tornado to be spawned by Hurricane Ian when it was at high-end Category 4 intensity.						

=== September 30 event ===
List of confirmed tornadoes – Friday, September 30, 2022
EF#	Location	County / Parish	State	Start Coord.	Time (UTC)	Path length	Max width
EF0	Holden Beach	Brunswick	NC	33.9128°N 78.2882°W	16:25–16:28	0.74 mi (1.19 km)	20 yd (18 m)
EF0	Homes sustained minor shingle and siding damage in town, and one residence sustained uplift of its front porch overhang.						
EFU	NE of Aurora	Beaufort	NC	35.3293°N 76.7116°W	19:22–19:23	0.52 mi (0.84 km)	12 yd (11 m)
EFU	High-resolution satellite imagery revealed a damage scar in a farm field.						

== October ==
Confirmed tornadoes by Enhanced Fujita rating
EFU	EF0	EF1	EF2	EF3	EF4	EF5	Total
4	27	7	1	0	0	0	39

=== October 3 event ===
List of confirmed tornadoes – Monday, October 3, 2022
EF#	Location	County / Parish	State	Start Coord.	Time (UTC)	Path length	Max width
EF1	NNW of Williams	Coconino	AZ	35.36°N 112.2108°W	19:37-19:52	0.7 mi (1.1 km)	30 yd (27 m)
EF1	Numerous structures and trees were damaged. The tornado caused $350,000 (2023 USD) in damage.						

=== October 8 event ===
List of confirmed tornadoes – Saturday, October 8, 2022
EF#	Location	County / Parish	State	Start Coord.	Time (UTC)	Path length	Max width
EF0	Sun City	Riverside	CA	33.7°N 117.213°W	21:25-21:32	1.56 mi (2.51 km)	50 yd (46 m)
EF0	A landspout tornado traveled over mostly open land near Canyon Lake.						

=== October 12 event ===
List of confirmed tornadoes – Wednesday, October 12, 2022
EF#	Location	County / Parish	State	Start Coord.	Time (UTC)	Path length	Max width
EF0	W of Watertown	Jefferson	WI	43.1746°N 88.8006°W	16:13–16:14	0.48 mi (0.77 km)	25 yd (23 m)
EF0	Damage to crops occurred as a result of this brief tornado.						
EF0	W of Johnson Creek	Jefferson	WI	43.0757°N 88.8178°W	16:18–16:19	0.44 mi (0.71 km)	25 yd (23 m)
EF0	This tornado was confirmed via Sentinel Satellite, which showed a path of crop damage.						
EF0	S of Sullivan	Jefferson	WI	42.9654°N 88.5854°W	16:42–16:43	0.79 mi (1.27 km)	25 yd (23 m)
EF0	This brief tornado was confirmed via Sentinel Satellite, which showed a brief tornado path.						
EFU	Whitewater	Walworth	WI	43.08°N 88.82°W	16:45	Unknown	Unknown
EFU	A condensation funnel was observed making contact with the ground.						
EF0	E of Nashotah	Waukesha	WI	43.1017°N 88.3812°W	16:48–16:50	0.61 mi (0.98 km)	50 yd (46 m)
EF0	A funnel with debris was reported, and light tree debris was lofted.						
EF0	SW of West Allis	Milwaukee	WI	43.0062°N 88.0434°W	17:17–17:27	3.07 mi (4.94 km)	40 yd (37 m)
EF0	Trees were damaged by this small and weak tornado. The circulation was captured on a security camera.						
EF0	E of Lake Geneva	Walworth	WI	42.5956°N 88.377°W	17:17–17:23	2.43 mi (3.91 km)	40 yd (37 m)
EF0	A weak tornado touched down at a cemetery and caused minor damage.						
EF0	S of Burlington	Racine	WI	42.6596°N 88.2872°W	17:20–17:24	3.97 mi (6.39 km)	25 yd (23 m)
EF0	Minor damage occurred.						
EF0	SSW of Scotland	Telfair	GA	31.9825°N 82.8483°W	00:55–00:56	0.38 mi (0.61 km)	100 yd (91 m)
EF0	Brief tornado crossed Highway 149 uprooting and snapping trees along its path.						

=== October 13 event ===
List of confirmed tornadoes – Thursday, October 13, 2022
EF#	Location	County / Parish	State	Start Coord.	Time (UTC)	Path length	Max width
EFU	Chapman Ranch	Nueces	TX	27.59°N 97.47°W	20:23–20:24	0.19 mi (0.31 km)	20 yd (18 m)
EFU	Landspout tornado occurred over open fields near Chapman Ranch.						

=== October 16 event ===
List of confirmed tornadoes – Sunday, October 16, 2022
EF#	Location	County / Parish	State	Start Coord.	Time (UTC)	Path length	Max width
EF0	S of Sun Lakes	Pinal	AZ	33.1997°N 111.8819°W	22:00–22:05	0.28 mi (0.45 km)	25 yd (23 m)
EF0	A landspout tornado caused no known damage.						

=== October 17 event ===
List of confirmed tornadoes – Monday, October 17, 2022
EF#	Location	County / Parish	State	Start Coord.	Time (UTC)	Path length	Max width
EF0	SE Florida Ridge	Indian River	FL	27.5655°N 80.3697°W	22:41–22:45	0.5 mi (0.80 km)	100 yd (91 m)
EF0	A tornado touched down in the Midway Estates mobile home community causing damage to 16 homes. The tornado continued southeast where it caused damage in the Vero Shores residential community.						

=== October 22 event ===
List of confirmed tornadoes – Sunday, October 22, 2022
EF#	Location	County / Parish	State	Start Coord.	Time (UTC)	Path length	Max width
EF0	NE Cherryville	Clackamas	OR	45.3753°N 122.1413°W	23:40–23:48	0.87 mi (1.40 km)	248 yd (227 m)
EF0	A weak tornado caused minor damage to a residence, an outbuilding, and downed power lines.						

=== October 24 event ===
List of confirmed tornadoes – Monday, October 24, 2022
EF#	Location	County / Parish	State	Start Coord.	Time (UTC)	Path length	Max width
EF0	W of Mustang	Canadian	OK	35.391°N 97.841°W	13:27–13:33	2.9 mi (4.7 km)	50 yd (46 m)
EF0	Tornado caused tree damage near SH 152. Moving northeast it damaged the roof to a residence before dissipating.						
EF0	E of Macomb	Pottawatomie	OK	35.144°N 96.933°W	15:32–15:32	0.1 mi (0.16 km)	10 yd (9.1 m)
EF0	Brief tornado reported by emergency management.						
EF0	W of Woodburn	Marion	OR	45.1607°N 122.9069°W	22:36–22:37	0.04 mi (0.064 km)	17 yd (16 m)
EF0	A brief and weak tornado caused damage to a few structures, trees, and fences near Woodburn. The tornado was on the ground for approximately 200 feet.						
EF1	SW of Jarrell	Williamson	TX	30.797°N 97.6742°W	01:46–01:53	3.86 mi (6.21 km)	150 yd (140 m)
EF1	A barn and some homes were damaged, and a two-story home that was under construction collapsed as the tornado touched down west of I-35. As the tornado crossed the Interstate it flipped a semi-trailer and downed nine wooden power poles, including one that was snapped in half. Additional power poles were damaged and snapped as the tornado continued to the east of the Interstate. A home sustained roof damage, a barn lost a portion of its roof, and a small, enclosed cargo trailer was lofted roughly 100 yards (91 m) downwind before the tornado dissipated. Trees were damaged and tree branches were snapped along the path.						

=== October 25 event ===
List of confirmed tornadoes – Tuesday, October 25, 2022
EF#	Location	County / Parish	State	Start Coord.	Time (UTC)	Path length	Max width
EF2	NW of Oberlin	Allen	LA	30.6520°N 92.8043°W	09:39–09:40	0.44 mi (0.71 km)	170 yd (160 m)
EF2	The front porch awning of a manufactured home was ripped off, and a carport fell onto a car as a result of this low-end EF2 tornado. The roll-up door of a small industrial building was damaged, and a loaded construction trailer was moved 4–6 feet (1.2–1.8 m). The most intense damage occurred in a wooded area, where several large hardwood trees were snapped, including one that landed on a manufactured home. After the tornado lifted, the funnel cloud continued to snap softwood trees for some distance.						
EF0	SW of Bonifay	Holmes	FL	30.7768°N 85.7261°W	04:14–04:19	1.12 mi (1.80 km)	70 yd (64 m)
EF0	A small metal outbuilding was lifted and tossed into a power pole. Several fence panels were blown out, and a large tree limb fell onto a vehicle.						

=== October 29 event ===
List of confirmed tornadoes – Saturday, October 29, 2022
EF#	Location	County / Parish	State	Start Coord.	Time (UTC)	Path length	Max width
EF0	SSW of Lizana	Harrison	MS	30.46°N 89.29°W	18:35–18:42	1.56 mi (2.51 km)	50 yd (46 m)
EF0	A tornado caused primarily branch and foliage damage as it moved north-northwest, snapping power poles when it tossed a small awning into them. The tornado continued through rural, wooded areas, with its path evident on radar, but no clear end point could be confirmed through satellite imagery.						
EF0	Moss Point to Escatawpa	Jackson	MS	30.4074°N 88.5116°W	19:21–19:35	5.08 mi (8.18 km)	75 yd (69 m)
EF0	This tornado touched down in Moss Point, breaking large tree branches, partially snapping a hardwood tree, and causing minor damage to a road sign and trees near an airfield. The tornado weakened as it moved northward, with damage gradually diminishing before lifting south of the a neighborhood.						
EF0	NNW of Big Point to S of Hurley	Jackson	MS	30.6°N 88.49°W	21:24–21:32	3.11 mi (5.01 km)	50 yd (46 m)
EF0	A high-end EF0 tornado caused tree damage, tilted a metal light pole at a park, and snapped several trees in a community. The tornado continued northward, paralleling MS-613 before gradually dissipating in an open field near MS-614.						
EF1	NNE of Vancleave	Jackson	MS	30.5976°N 88.6424°W	21:28–21:32	1.46 mi (2.35 km)	125 yd (114 m)
EF1	A home was damaged, a small metal shelter was tossed, and a small outbuilding was rolled. Trees were snapped along the path.						
EF0	SW of Theodore	Mobile	AL	30.516°N 88.1968°W	22:03–22:08	1.84 mi (2.96 km)	20 yd (18 m)
EF0	A weak touched down southwest of Theodore, damaging trees and homes. A shed was partially damaged as well.						
EFU	NE of Vancleave to WSW of Wade	Jackson	MS	30.58°N 88.6°W	22:04–22:13	3.85 mi (6.20 km)	25 yd (23 m)
EFU	This tornado caused minor, patchy tree damage along the Pascagoula River, with the extent of the damage unclear due to limited satellite imagery resolution.						
EF0	W of Bon Secour	Baldwin	AL	30.3159°N 87.7587°W	22:10–22:12	0.5 mi (0.80 km)	20 yd (18 m)
EF0	A barn was destroyed and a chicken coop was flipped over. A travel trailer had its windows broken by flying debris. Trees were snapped or uprooted along the path as well.						
EF1	S of Magnolia Springs	Baldwin	AL	30.3638°N 87.7665°W	22:16–22:18	0.59 mi (0.95 km)	40 yd (37 m)
EF1	Several wooden power poles were snapped, and light tree damage was observed.						
EF0	Mobile	Mobile	AL	30.613°N 88.0551°W	22:23–22:30	2.67 mi (4.30 km)	110 yd (100 m)
EF0	A tornado came ashore on the southern end of the Mobile Downtown Airport. It caused no apparent damage as it crossed the airport. Afterwards the tornado knocked down trees and fences. The last known damage was to a roof that was removed from a house.						
EFU	NNW of Wade	Jackson	MS	30.6877°N 88.5766°W	22:33–22:40	2.83 mi (4.55 km)	25 yd (23 m)
EFU	A trained storm spotter videoed a tornado; no damage was reported.						
EF1	W of Theodore	Mobile	AL	30.537°N 88.2623°W	23:40–23:50	4.9 mi (7.9 km)	250 yd (230 m)
EF1	Several homes sustained shingle, fascia, and window damage. Several sheds were damaged, and trees and fences were also damaged along the path.						
EF1	ESE of Oyster Bay to Bon Secour	Baldwin	AL	30.2785°N 87.7249°W	23:50–23:59	2.48 mi (3.99 km)	110 yd (100 m)
EF1	This tornado originated as a waterspout over a bay before moving onshore into a heavily forested area, where it was likely weak or discontinuous. A barn lost most of its tin roofing, and a manufactured home was rolled and completely destroyed. Three people inside the manufactured home received minor injuries. A pontoon boat on a trailer was moved about 30 yards (27 m), and minor damage occurred at a construction site before the tornado lifted. Hardwood and softwood trees were snapped along the path.						
EF0	NW of Mobile (1st tornado)	Mobile	AL	30.7087°N 88.1346°W	23:57–00:02	2.14 mi (3.44 km)	10 yd (9.1 m)
EF0	A weak EF0 downed trees and branches before crossing over Moffett Road into inaccessible land where it was presumed to have dissipated.						
EF0	NW of Mobile (2nd tornado)	Mobile	AL	30.713°N 88.1879°W	00:09–00:15	2.45 mi (3.94 km)	180 yd (160 m)
EF0	A high-end EF0 touched down northwest of Mobile, uprooting softwood trees and removing roof shingles from a few residences.						
EF0	NW of Barnwell	Baldwin	AL	30.4426°N 87.9109°W	01:51–01:52	0.02 mi (0.032 km)	20 yd (18 m)
EF0	A very brief tornado shifted a wooden carport off its holding blocks, moved a loaded trailer about 20 feet (6.1 m), and uprooted a hardwood tree. It is possible this tornado began before the current starting point, but limited road access made additional investigation difficult for damage surveyors.						
EF0	Daphne	Baldwin	AL	30.6028°N 87.894°W	02:19–02:20	0.6 mi (0.97 km)	20 yd (18 m)
EF0	One home lost some roof shingles, and trees were snapped or uprooted in town.						
EF1	Spanish Fort	Baldwin	AL	30.6688°N 87.8956°W	02:29–02:30	0.25 mi (0.40 km)	20 yd (18 m)
EF1	A brief and intermittent tornado snapped or uprooted multiple trees in Spanish Fort.						

=== October 30 event ===
List of confirmed tornadoes – Sunday, October 30, 2022
EF#	Location	County / Parish	State	Start Coord.	Time (UTC)	Path length	Max width
EF0	SE of Fort Walton Beach	Okaloosa	FL	30.393°N 86.5927°W	17:35–17:36	0.08 mi (0.13 km)	20 yd (18 m)
EF0	A waterspout made landfall before tossing a large shed on Brackin Wayside Beach. The tornado dissipated before reaching Highway 98.						

== See also ==
- Tornadoes of 2022
- List of United States tornadoes from May to June 2022
- List of United States tornadoes from November to December 2022
