= Tylerton, Maryland =

Unincorporated community in Maryland, United States

- Unincorporated community
- Location within Maryland
- Coordinates: 37°58′04″N 76°01′23″W
- Country: United States
- State: Maryland
- County: Somerset
- Elevation: 3.3 ft (1 m)
- Time zone: UTC-5 (Eastern (EST))
  - Summer (DST): UTC-4 (EDT)
- ZIP code: 21866
- Area codes: 410, 443, and 667
- GNIS feature ID: 591450

Tylerton is an unincorporated community located on Smith Island in Somerset County, Maryland, United States. Tylerton can be accessed via a ferry from Crisfield, Maryland. It is a waterman village of 50 residents. Attractions in the community include the Inn of Silent Music and The Drum Point Market, which sells beverages, homemade Smith Island cakes, crab cakes and other Chesapeake Bay specialties. The Chesapeake Bay Foundation's Smith Island Study Center is located in Tylerton. It is the southernmost community in Maryland.

== History and language ==
British settlers arrived on the island in the 17th century, arriving from Cornwall, Wales, and Dorset via Virginia.

The community features a local dialect which is derived from the dialects of the West Country of England and the dialect of Cornwall. The dialect contains some relict features indicative of its origins. This dialect is similar to the Ocracoke Brogue, sometimes referred to as the Outer Banks Brogue.

The Island Belle, a former passenger ferry to the island, was listed on the National Register of Historic Places in 1979.
