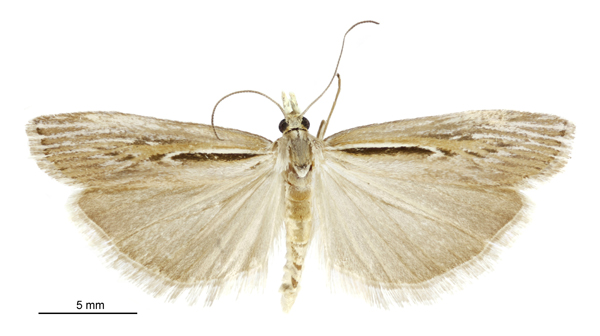
- Male

Conservation status
- Nationally Critical (NZ TCS)

Scientific classification
- Kingdom: Animalia
- Phylum: Arthropoda
- Clade: Pancrustacea
- Class: Insecta
- Order: Lepidoptera
- Family: Crambidae
- Subfamily: Crambinae
- Tribe: incertae sedis
- Genus: Maoricrambus; Gaskin, 1975
- Species: M. oncobolus

Binomial name
- Maoricrambus oncobolus (Meyrick, 1885)

Synonyms
- Crambus oncobolus Meyrick, 1885; Crambus oncolobus Hampson, 1896

= Maoricrambus =

Genus of moths

Maoricrambus is a genus of moths of the family Crambidae. It contains only one species, Maoricrambus oncobolus, which is endemic to New Zealand. In 2025 this species was classified as "nationally critical" under the New Zealand Threat Classification System by the Department of Conservation as it is impacted by climate change and is range restricted and is relict. The conservation status of this species has worsened.

== Taxonomy ==
M. oncobolus was named by Edward Meyrick in 1885 and described using a specimen collected at Castle Hill Basin, now part of the Kura Tāwhiti Conservation Area near Arthur's Pass. In 1895 when listing the species George Hampson misspelt it resulting in the synonym for the species of Crambus oncolobus. In 1975 D. E. Gaskin erected the monotypic genus Maoricrambus for Crambus oncolobus. The lectotype and paralectotype specimens are held at the Natural History Museum, London.

== Description ==
Meyrick described the species as follows:

Male, female. — 24-27 mm. Head white. Palpi very long, white, externally slightly ochreous-tinged. Antennas whitish, in male shortly ciliated. Thorax white or greyish-white, shoulders ochreous. Abdomen whitish-ochreous. Legs white, anterior pair internally fuscous. Forewings elongate, narrow, tolerably dilated, costa gently arched, apex round-pointed, hindmargin straight, oblique, strongly rounded beneath; pale fuscous; all veins suffused with white, more or less confluent towards costa posteriorly, and obscurely margined with dark fuscous; a narrow white central streak from base to middle of disc, its apex sharply hooked downwards, margined beneath throughout by a strong black streak finely attenuated at base, and its apex margined posteriorly with black; above the white central streak is a yellow-ochreous streak becoming dilated beyond it and suffused into ground- colour, and beneath the black streak a yellow-ochreous streak reaching apex of hook; an ill-defined strongly dentate blackish posterior transverse line, tending to separate into longitudinal dashes, sharply angulated outwards above middle, and sinuate inwards towards inner margin : cilia pale greyish, suffusedly barred with white, tips white. Hindwings pale grey; cilia whitish-grey.

M. oncobolus is very similar in appearance to Orocrambus harpophorus. However M. oncobolus does not have the subterminal spotting of the forewings that can be found on the forewings of O. harpophorus. Also the two species are dissimilar in both the male and female genital structure.

Adults are on wing from December to February.

== Distribution ==
M. oncobolus is endemic to New Zealand. This species is restricted to central Canterbury and Southland. Specimens of this species have been collected at Porter River among the boulders and lichens near the edge of the river and at the Sandy Point Domain near Invercargill.

== Habitat ==
M. oncobolus is associated with riverside grasslands in Southland and braided riverbeds central Canterbury.

== Host plants ==
The host plants of this species are unknown.

== Conservation status ==
In 2025 this species was classified as "Nationally Critical" with the report stating that this species is impacted by climate change, is range restricted and is relict. The conservation status of this species has worsened as in 2015 M. oncobolus was regarded as being "Nationally Endangered" under the New Zealand Threat Classification System.
