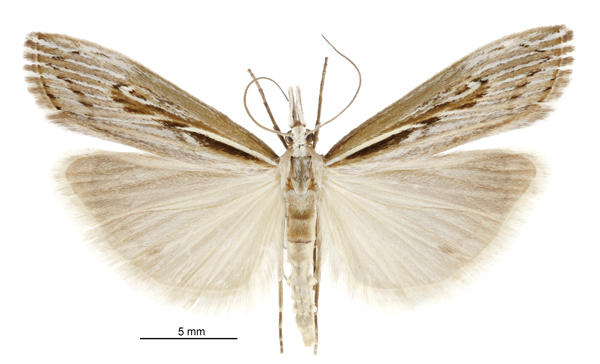
- Male

Scientific classification
- Kingdom: Animalia
- Phylum: Arthropoda
- Clade: Pancrustacea
- Class: Insecta
- Order: Lepidoptera
- Family: Crambidae
- Genus: Orocrambus
- Species: O. harpophorus

Binomial name
- Orocrambus harpophorus (Meyrick, 1882)

Synonyms
- Crambus harpophorus Meyrick, 1882

= Orocrambus harpophorus =

Species of moth endemic to New Zealand

Orocrambus harpophorus is a moth in the family Crambidae. It was first described by Edward Meyrick in 1882. It is endemic to New Zealand and has been recorded from throughout South Island and only at Levin, Paiaka, and Mount Tongariro in the Manawatū-Whanganui region of the North Island. This species inhabits grassy places and can be see at altitudes from sea level up to 1,524 metres (5,000 ft). Although it may be common locally in coastal habitat this species is regarded as being subalpine and alpine in nature. It has been hypothesised that, in the North Island, O. harpophorus has two broods a year. Adults are on the wing from December until March.

== Taxonomy ==
This species was first described by Edward Meyrick in 1882 using the original name Crambus harpophorus. In 1883 Meyrick gave a fuller description of the species. George Hudson discussed and illustrated this species under the name Crambus harpophorus in his 1928 book The butterflies and moths of New Zealand. In 1975 David E. Gaskin, in his revision of New Zealand Crambini, placed this species in the genus Orocrambus. The male lectotype, collected at Lake Wakatipu by Richard William Fereday, is held at the Natural History Museum, London.

== Description ==
O. harpophorus at rest.

Illustration by Hudson.

Meyrick originally described the adult male of this species as follows:

Male.—26-27 mm. Head whitish, with a faint ochreous spot in middle of face, and posterior margin of eyes greyish-ochreous. Maxillary palpi white, towards base externally dark fuscous mixed with ochreous. Labial palpi moderate, fuscous-grey, internally and at base beneath snow-white. Antennae dark fuscous. Thorax grey, with a whitish spot in middle of anterior margin. Abdomen grey-whitish, posteriorly suffused with pale ochreous. Legs light fuscous-grey, posterior pair more whitish. Fore-wings rather narrow, posteriorly dilated, costa slightly sinuate in middle, gently arched posteriorly, apex rounded, hindmargin moderately oblique, rounded ; grey, very slightly brownish-tinged ; a slender ill-defined central streak of white scales from base to beyond middle of disc, its extremity bent downwards and then sharply turned inwards to form a strong hook ; upper edge of this streak margined by a very slender dark grey line, forming an abrupt spot on extremity, lower edge margined by a dark fuscous-grey streak, filling up the hook ; a slender ill-defined sinuate longitudinal streak of white scales in disc from 1/3 to 2/3, its anterior extremity resting on upper margin of basal streak, its lower edge broadly and suffusedly margined with dark fuscous-grey until it touches basal streak, its upper edge marked with a dark fuscous dot before extremity, surrounded with a few whitish scales ; a transverse series of tolerably distinct elongate dark fuscous dots crossing wing from 3/4 of costa to inner margin before anal angle, strongly angulated outwards in middle; veins posteriorly indistinctly marked with lines of whitish scales; a very fine dark grey hindmarginal line: cilia grey, indistinctly barred with whitish, and with extreme base whitish. Hindwings grey-whitish ; cilia whitish, with a faint grey line.

The wingspan of both sexes is 25–29 mm. There is some variation in the appearance of the adult moth with those in the far south being darker and greyer. Some specimens from the North Island locality of Levin are smaller in size and browner in colour with indistinct markings on the forewings.

O. harpophorus resembles both Tawhitia pentadactyla (which frequents marshy lowland habitat) and Maoricrambus oncobolus as all three species have black and white basal streaks on the forewing. O. harpophorus can best be distinguished from these two species via examination of the genitalia. However O. harpophorus can be distinguished from M. oncobolus as the former species has subterminal spotting of the forewings.

== Distribution ==
This species is endemic to New Zealand. It is found in the South Island as well as in the North Island but only at Levin, Paiaka, and Mount Tongariro in the Manawatū-Whanganui region.

== Habitat and hosts ==
This species inhabits grassy places and can be seen at altitudes from sea level up to 1,524 metres (5,000 ft). Although it can be locally common in coastal habitat this species is regarded as frequenting subalpine and alpine grass habitat.

== Behaviour ==
It is possible that this species has two broods a year in the North Island. Adults are on the wing from December until March.
