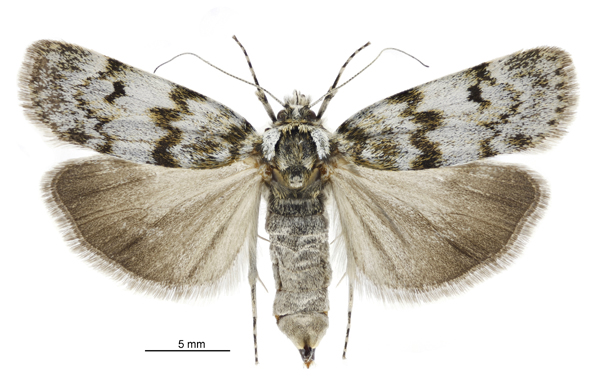
- Female T. glaucophanes

Scientific classification
- Kingdom: Animalia
- Phylum: Arthropoda
- Clade: Pancrustacea
- Class: Insecta
- Order: Lepidoptera
- Family: Crambidae
- Subfamily: Crambinae
- Tribe: Crambini
- Genus: Tawhitia; Philpott, 1931

Synonyms
- Velasquez Bleszynski, 1962

= Tawhitia =

Genus of moths

Tawhitia is a genus of moths of the family Crambidae. This genus was first described by Alfred Philpott in 1931.

== Species ==
Species in this genus include:

- Tawhitia glaucophanes (Meyrick, 1907)
- Tawhitia pentadactylus (Zeller, 1863)
