= Solomons Lump Light =

Lighthouse in Maryland, United States

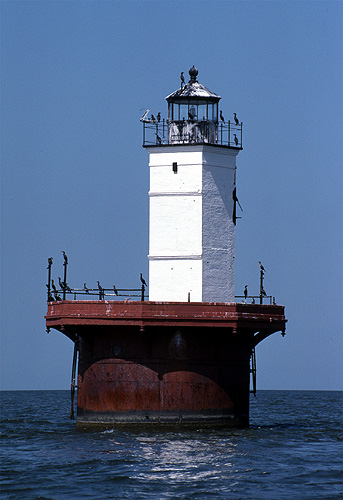
- Location: Kedges Straits North of Smith Island
- Coordinates: 38.04806°N 76.01502°W

Tower
- Constructed: 1875 (original screwpile)
- Foundation: Pneumatic caisson
- Construction: brick
- Automated: 1950
- Height: 11.5 m (38 ft)
- Shape: square tower on cylindrical base
- Markings: white tower on brown base

Light
- First lit: 1895 (current caisson)
- Focal height: 47 feet (14 m)
- Lens: fourth order Fresnel lens (original), 7.9 inches (200 mm) (current)
- Range: White: 8 nautical miles (15 km; 9.2 mi); Red: 6 nautical miles (11 km; 6.9 mi)
- Characteristic: Fl W 6s with two red sectors

Solomons Lump Light is a lighthouse in the Chesapeake Bay, the abbreviated remains of a caisson light built in 1895. That structure replaced a screw-pile light built on the same spot in 1875, which in turn superseded the Fog Point Light.

== History ==
The Fog Point Light, on the northwestern corner of Smith Island, marked the entrance to Kedges Strait from 1827. By 1872 it was held to be ineffective in protecting a shoal extending north from the island, and a new light was sought specifically to mark the shoal. In 1875 a five-legged screw-pile structure was built, which survived until 1893, when ice knocked it over. Initial plans to replace it with a new screw-pile light were changed when extra funds became available from the savings in constructing Wolf Trap Light in Virginia, so a caisson structure was erected instead in 1895, using the pneumatic process to sink it in place. The bottom being soft, the caisson sank further than expected, and an extra course of plates had to be added to the top. A brick tower and octagonal wooden house were erected on this foundation.

Originally the new light was given a fifth-order fresnel lens. In 1919, however, this lens was replaced with the fourth-order lens from Cherrystone Bar Light in Virginia. Automation came in 1950, and some years later the house was removed, leaving the brick tower standing off-center on the platform.
