= Rhodes Point, Maryland =

Unincorporated community in Maryland, United States

- Unincorporated community
- Location within Maryland
- Coordinates: 37°58′27″N 76°02′28″W
- Country: United States
- State: Maryland
- County: Somerset
- Elevation: 0 ft (0 m)
- Time zone: UTC-5 (Eastern (EST))
  - Summer (DST): UTC-4 (EDT)
- ZIP code: 21824
- Area codes: 410, 443, and 667
- GNIS feature ID: 591121

Rhodes Point is an unincorporated community located on Smith Island in Somerset County, Maryland, United States. Rhodes Point lies on the same insular mass as does the main Smith Island town of Ewell. A number of canal-like waterways separate the two communities but bridges and a road connect them.
