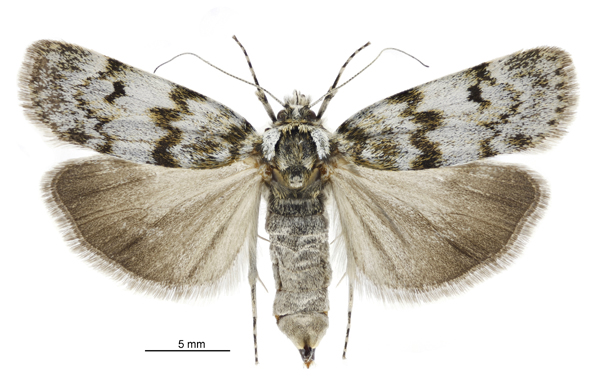
- Female
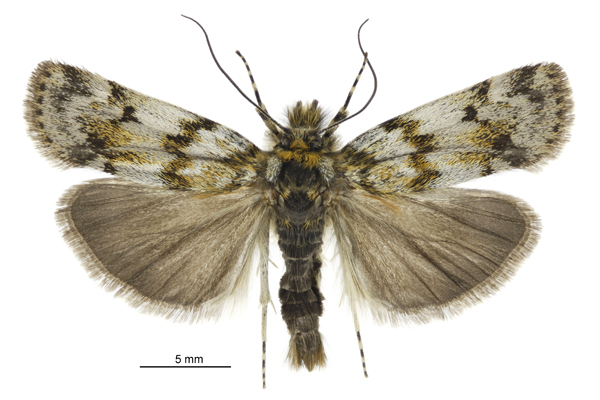
- Male

Scientific classification
- Kingdom: Animalia
- Phylum: Arthropoda
- Clade: Pancrustacea
- Class: Insecta
- Order: Lepidoptera
- Family: Crambidae
- Subfamily: Crambinae
- Tribe: Crambini
- Genus: Tawhitia
- Species: T. glaucophanes

Binomial name
- Tawhitia glaucophanes (Meyrick, 1907)

Synonyms
- Tauroscopa glaucophanes Meyrick, 1907; Tawhitia leonina Philpott, 1931

= Tawhitia glaucophanes =

Species of moth

Tawhitia glaucophanes is a moth in the family Crambidae. It was described by Edward Meyrick in 1907. It is endemic to New Zealand, where it has been recorded from Fiordland to Mount Cook.

The wingspan is 21–32 mm. Adults are on wing from late December to February.
