= Fog Point Light =

Lighthouse in Maryland, United States

- Location: Northwest tip of Smith Island, Maryland
- Coordinates: 38.0299°N 76.0417°W (approximate)

Tower
- Construction: stone/wood
- Height: 40 ft
- Shape: House with lantern on roof

Light
- First lit: 1827
- Deactivated: 1875
- Lens: fifth-order Fresnel lens

The Fog Point Light was a historic lighthouse located at Fog Point, the northwestern tip of Smith Island, Maryland in the Chesapeake Bay.

== History ==
This light was constructed in 1827 by John Donahoo to mark the entrance to the Kedges Strait north of Smith Island. Originally equipped with 10 Argand lamps and reflectors, it received a fifth-order Fresnel lens in 1855.

This light's isolated location on swampy ground was cause for concern, and in 1872 a Lighthouse Board report noted it as having little value. In 1875 it was supplanted by the Solomons Lump Light, which stood in the strait to the northeast. The old light was abandoned, and no trace of it remains.
