= Smith Island, Maryland =

- Census-designated place
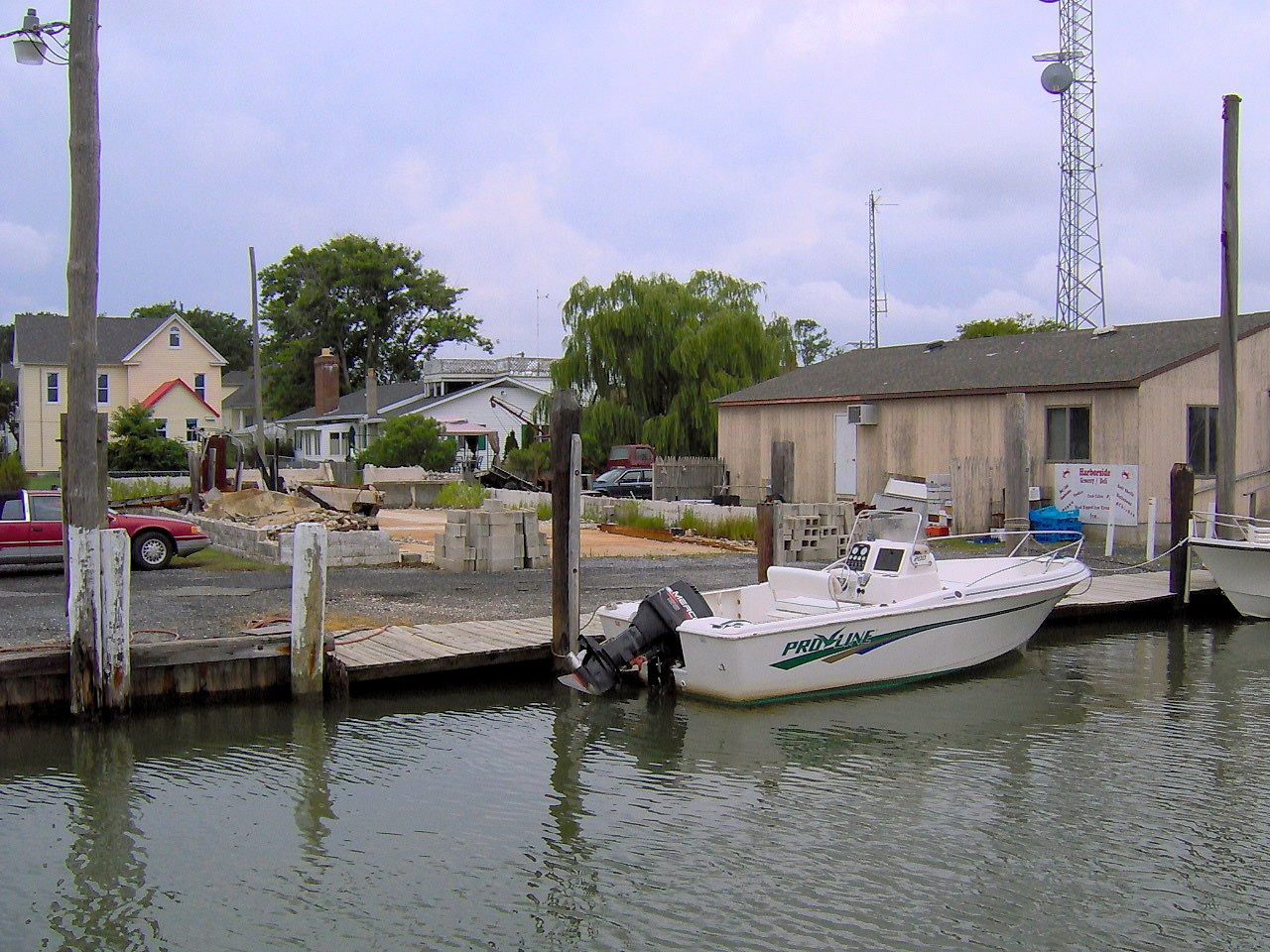
- Harbor at Ewell

- Flag
- Nickname: "The Rock"
- Coordinates: 37°59′N 76°02′W
- Country: United States
- State: Maryland
- County: Somerset

Area
  - Total: 9.18 sq mi (23.77 km^{2})
  - Land: 4.35 sq mi (11.27 km^{2})
  - Water: 4.83 sq mi (12.50 km^{2})
- Elevation: 0 ft (0 m)

Population (2020)
  - Total: 202
  - Density: 46.4/sq mi (17.93/km^{2})
- Time zone: UTC−5 (Eastern (EST))
  - Summer (DST): UTC−4 (EDT)
- FIPS code: 24-72887
- GNIS feature ID: 1852600
- Website: www.visitsmithisland.com

Smith Island is a collection of three distinct island communities – Tylerton, Rhodes Point, and Ewell, Maryland – on the Chesapeake Bay, on the border of Maryland and Virginia territorial waters in the United States. The island is the last inhabited island in Maryland that is not accessible by car (the Virginia portion of the island is not currently inhabited). Most of the islands are eroding due to tidal currents and sea level rise; a study conducted in 2008 by the DNR reported that Smith Island is expected to completely erode by 2100 if no action is taken.

The island's population is approximately 220, down from a peak of about 800. On its Maryland side, Smith Island is a census-designated place (CDP) in Somerset County. It is included in the Salisbury, Maryland-Delaware Metropolitan Statistical Area.

== Geography ==
Smith Island lies approximately 10 miles (16 km) west of Crisfield, Maryland, across the Tangier Sound portion of the Chesapeake Bay. The island consists of three communities, namely Ewell, Tylerton, and Rhodes Point, which all sit on the Maryland portion of the island. The Virginia portion is presently uninhabited.

Although a portion of this island lies within Virginia, "Smith Island, Virginia" refers to a separate but identically named barrier island off Cape Charles.

=== Sea level rise ===
By the 2010s, the island had shrunk, mainly from erosion and rising sea levels. In the last 150 years, Smith Island has lost over 3,300 acres (1,335 ha; 5 mi^{2}; 13 km^{2}) of wetlands. The island is projected to be completely eroded by 2100 should the sea level rise by another foot (30 cm). Preventative measures have been implemented, including a jetty-building project completed in 2018, and the realignment of waterways through dredging. These restoration efforts will be ongoing for the next 50 years to restore 1,900 acres (769 ha; 3 mi^{2}; 8 km^{2}) of submerged aquatic vegetation and 240 acres (97 ha; 0 mi^{2}; 1 km^{2}) of wetlands. Moreover, the island is building additional coastal defenses.

== Demographics ==
Historical population
Census	Pop.	Note	%±
2020	202		—
U.S. Decennial Census

The Smith Island CDP is located in a small town–area in the central part of the island, spread across the three villages of Ewell, Rhodes Point, and Tylerton, all located in the state of Maryland. The northern part of Smith Island also includes the Martin National Wildlife Refuge. The southernmost portion of the island, consisting of marsh, lies in Accomack County, Virginia.

As of the 2010 Census, there were 276 people residing in the Smith Island CDP. The population density was 81.7 inhabitants per square mile (31.5/km^{2}). There were 218 housing units, at an average density of 57.5 per square mile (22.2/km^{2}). The racial makeup of the CDP was 99.6% White, 0.82% African American, 0.27% Native American, and 0.82% from two or more races. 51% of Smith Island's residents were English, 4% Greek, 3% Irish, 3% Scottish, and 3% French.

There were 167 households, of which 19.2% had children under the age of 18 living with them, 60.5% were married couples living together, 4.2% had a female householder with no husband present, and 32.9% were non-families. 29.3% of all households were made up of individuals, and 16.8% had someone living alone who was 65 years of age or older. The average household size was 2.18, and the average family size was 2.69.

The median age was 50 years, with 14.6% under the age of 18, 5.5% from 18 to 24, 22.3% from 25 to 44, 34.6% from 45 to 64, and 23.1% who were 65 years of age or older. For every 100 females, there were 95.7 males. For every 100 females age 18 and over, there were 96.8 males.

The median household income was $26,324, and the median family income was $29,375. Males had a median income of $26,250, versus $28,750 for females. The per capita income was $25,469. About 14.4% of families and 37.8% of the population were below the poverty line, including 26.9% of those under age 18 and 67.9% of those age 65 or over.

== Transportation ==
Smith Island has no airport and no bridges to the mainland; it can be accessed only by boat. Passenger-only ferries connect Smith Island at Ewell to Point Lookout, Maryland, and Reedville, Virginia, on the Western shore of the Chesapeake Bay (seasonal), and from Crisfield, Maryland, on its Eastern Shore (year-round). A daily passenger ferry also runs between Crisfield, Maryland, and the smaller island of Tylerton, Maryland.

In addition to public ferry services, guided boat tours operate between Crisfield and Smith Island, offering visitors an opportunity to explore the island's history and culture. Experience Smith Island, a Chesapeake Bay storytelling and heritage tour operator, provides transportation to the island along with guided tours focusing on local traditions, seafood harvesting, and Smith Island cake demonstrations.

Few motor vehicles exist on the islands, and these are all in the northern community of Ewell and the connected Rhodes Point. Main modes of transportation for all three communities include golf carts as well as non-motorized transportation.

== History and language ==
An 18-year-old waterman's son from Rhodes Point talking to an interviewer about working on the water and the erosion of Smith Island (c. 1984)

The island was charted by John Smith. British settlers arrived on the island in the 17th century, coming from Cornwall and Wales, as well as Dorset, England, via Virginia. The island's population peaked in the early 1900s, at 800.

Smith Island is inhabited by one of the region's oldest English-speaking communities, known for its relic accent, which preserves many speech patterns from the original English colonial settlers. The local dialect is like the dialects of the West Country of England, including Cornwall. The dialect contains some relict features indicative of its origins. The dialect is like the Ocracoke Brogue, sometimes referred to as the Outer Banks Brogue. However, it even more closely resembles the unique accent on the nearby Tangier Island, Virginia.

The 1940 Maryland guide described a series of economic conflicts that characterized relationships between the inhabitants of Smith Island, the inhabitants of nearby Tangier Island, and agencies of the Federal government in the late 19th and early 20th centuries. For example, although 23,000 acres of rich oyster beds had been ceded from Maryland to Virginia in 1877,

the Smith Island men kept on dredging there for 50 years despite repeated attacks by Virginia patrol boats and inter-island battles in which oystermen on both sides were killed and wounded. The warfare ended only when the oysters in the area died ... Although killing wild ducks for market has been outlawed by Federal enactment since 1918, Smith Island remains a source of anxiety to the United States Biological Survey. Wardens risk their lives when drawn to the lonely island marshes by the deep booming of swivel guns mounted in sneak-boats—artillery that throws a pound of shot at a blast to kill and cripple ducks by the hundreds. To spot wire-enclosed duck traps, wardens in airplanes drop streamers of paper for the guidance of wardens in boats who attempt to make arrests, sometimes successfully, sometimes not. The islanders are sure that God has given them the ducks, oysters, fish, and crabs to take as they wish and they bitterly resent man-made game laws.

— Federal Writers' Project, "Part III: Touring the State", Maryland: A Guide to the Old Line State (1940)

The Island Belle, a former passenger ferry to the islands, was listed on the National Register of Historic Places in 1979.

After Hurricane Sandy in 2012, the Maryland Department of Housing and Community Development offered buyouts to landowners, most of whom refused the offer.

== Smith Island cake ==
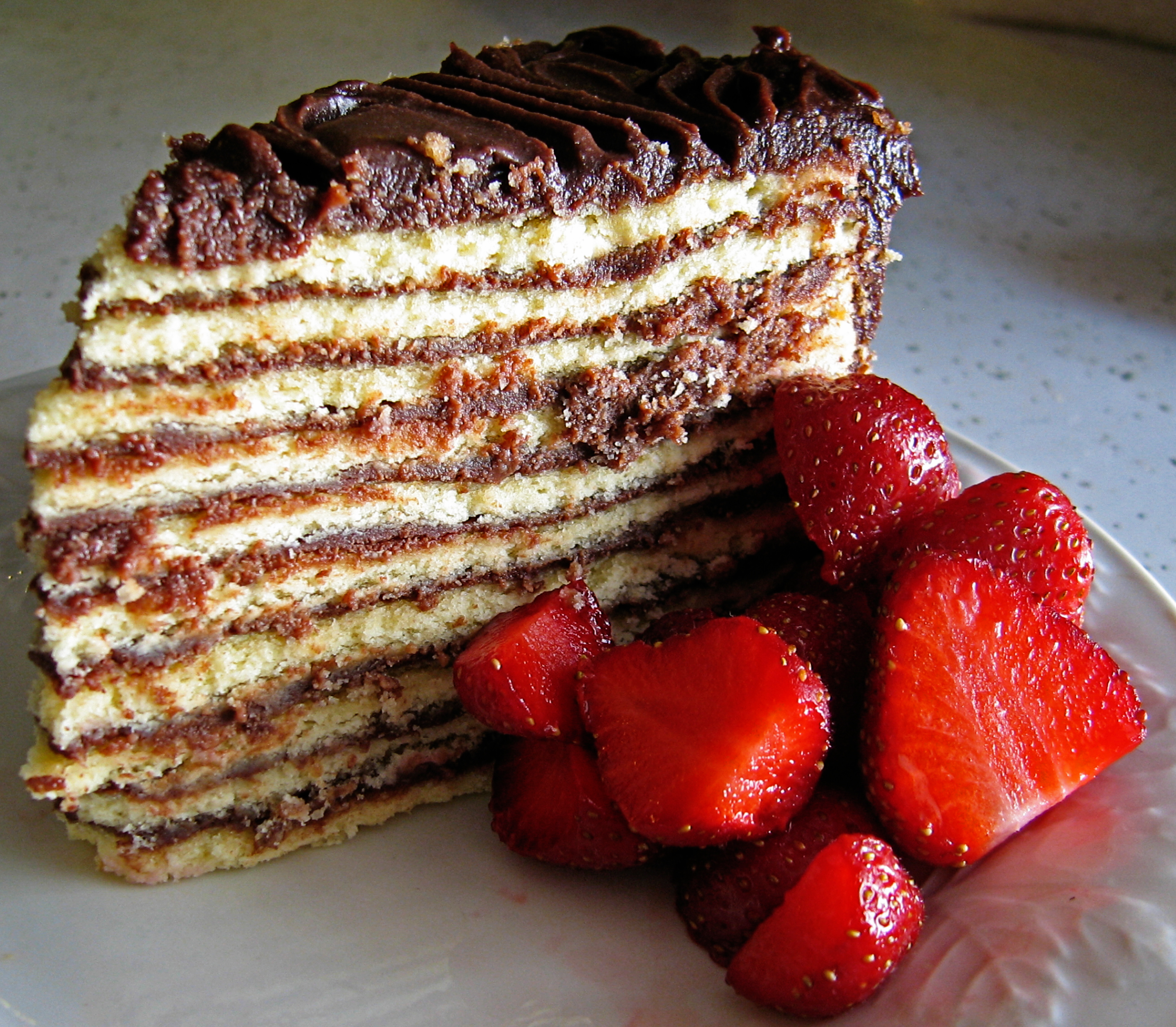
Smith Island cake with fresh strawberries on the side

Smith Island traditions include a region-specific cuisine, its most famous dish being the Smith Island cake, somewhat resembling the Prinzregententorte, with eight to fifteen thin layers alternating with cooked chocolate frosting.

Beginning in the 1800s, Smith Islanders would send these cakes with the watermen on the autumn oyster harvest. The bakers began using fudge instead of buttercream frostings, as cakes frosted with fudge lasted much longer than cakes with other types of frosting.

Scratch recipes typically involve evaporated milk, while recipes based on commercial cake mixes add condensed milk.

The most common recipes yield yellow cake with chocolate frosting, but other flavor variations include coconut, fig, strawberry, lemon, and orange. Smith Island cake is baked for any occasion, a dessert that needs no holiday.

Smith Island cake is also baked as the feature prize for a local fundraising tradition called a cake walk, which is a game played like musical chairs where donated cakes serve as the prize. Great attention is paid to the perfection of the pencil-thin layers that form the distinctive cake. Before each round, the prize Smith Island cake at stake is cut in half and shown to the players, who pay to participate in the game. A poorly stacked Smith Island cake may not attract many players and, as a result, not raise as much money as a more perfectly executed cake.

Smith Island cake became the officially designated state dessert of Maryland on April 24, 2008.

== See also ==
- Island Belle
- Fog Point Light
- Solomons Lump Light
- Tangier Island
