= Glenn Martin National Wildlife Refuge =

Nature preserve in Maryland and Virginia

- IUCN category IV (habitat/species management area)
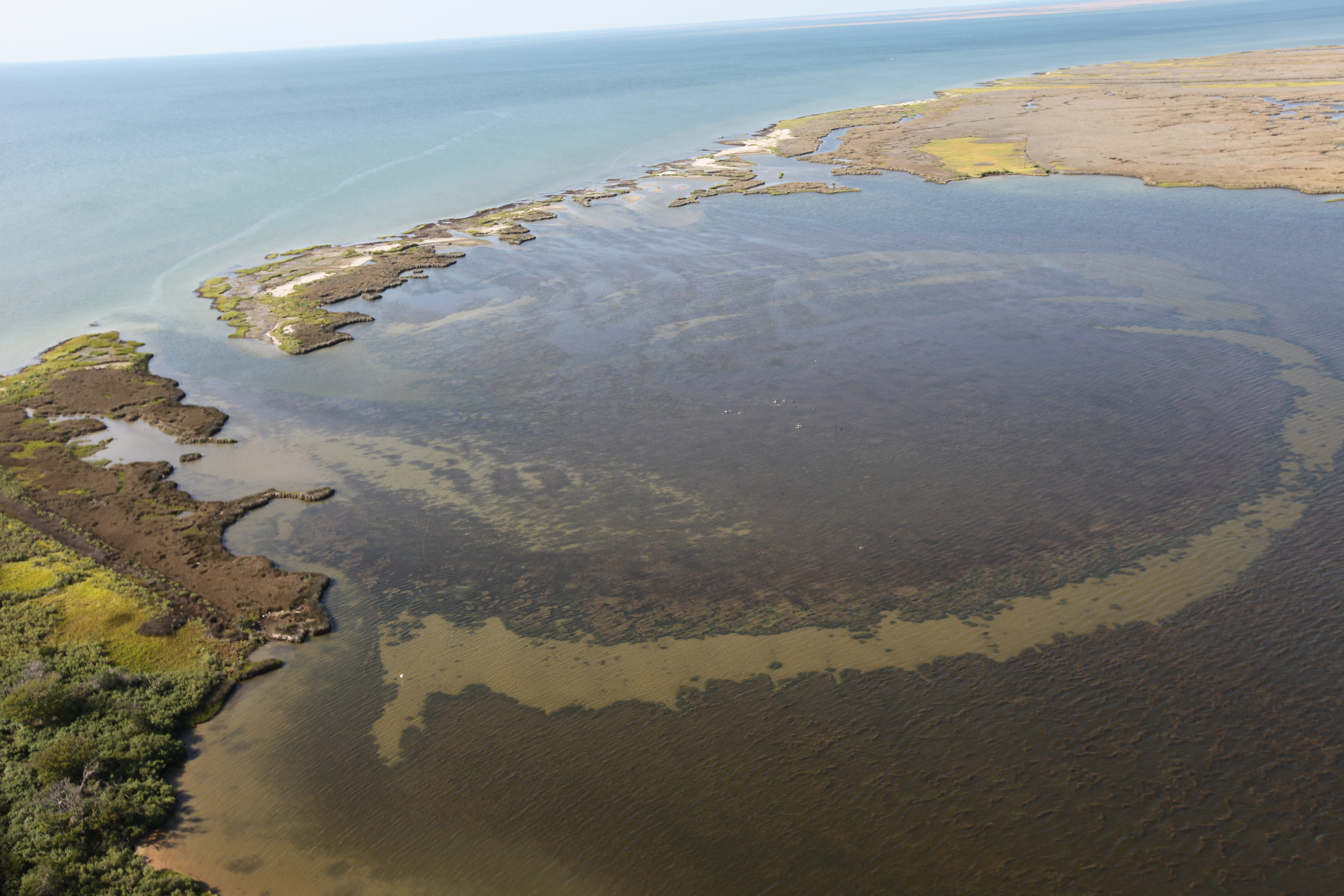
- Cove at Martin National Wildlife Refuge

- Location within Maryland Location within the United States
- Location: Somerset County, Maryland, Accomack County, Virginia, United States
- Nearest city: Crisfield, Maryland
- Coordinates: 38.01901°N 76.01826°W
- Area: 4,548 acres (18.41 km^{2})
- Established: 1954
- Governing body: U.S. Fish and Wildlife Service
- Website: Glenn Martin National Wildlife Refuge

Glenn Martin National Wildlife Refuge includes the northern half of Smith Island (in Somerset County, Maryland), which lies 11 miles (18 km) west of Crisfield, Maryland, and Watts Island (in Accomack County, Virginia), which is located between the eastern shore of Virginia and Tangier Island. Both islands are situated in the lower Chesapeake Bay.

The refuge was established in 1954 when the late Glenn L. Martin donated 2,569 acres (10.40 km^{2}) to the U.S. Fish and Wildlife Service. Since then, donation and purchase has increased the size of the refuge to 4,548 acres (18.41 km^{2}). The tidal marsh, coves and creeks, and vegetated ridges of the refuge form an important stopover and wintering area for thousands of migratory waterfowl and nesting habitat for various wildlife species.

Martin National Wildlife Refuge is the largest unit of the Chesapeake Islands Refuges, which also includes Spring Island, Barren Island, and Bishops Head in Dorchester County, Maryland. The management of the Chesapeake Islands Refuges falls under the umbrella of the Chesapeake Marshlands National Wildlife Refuge Complex. Located in Cambridge, Maryland, the complex also manages Blackwater National Wildlife Refuge and Susquehanna River National Wildlife Refuge.

== Wildlife ==
The tidal marsh, coves, creeks and ridges of the refuge provide an important rest area and winter home for thousands of migratory waterfowl and nesting habitat for a variety of wildlife that change with the seasons.

Winter residents on the refuge include black ducks, pintail, mergansers, long-tailed ducks, scoters, bufflehead, Canada geese, and tundra swans. During spring and summer, the salt marsh grasses, abundant insects, and underwater vegetation attract black ducks, mallards, gadwall, and green-winged teal to nest on the refuge. Gulls, terns, black skimmers, oystercatchers, and willets nest and feed along the marsh grasses, mudflats, and sand bars. The wooded ridges provide nest sites for several water birds. Ten different species, including herons, egrets, and glossy ibis have been seen in rookeries on the refuge. Rookeries are groups or colonies of birds that nest together. Martin NWR supports the largest colony of brown pelicans in the Maryland portion of the Chesapeake Bay.

A small population of red fox, muskrat, mink, otter, voles, northern diamondback terrapin, and various nonvenomous water snakes also live in the marsh areas. Clapper rails, seaside sparrows, and marsh wrens also depend on the protected refuge habitat. Peregrine falcons have been nesting on the refuge every year since the first peregrine nesting tower was installed in 1984. The marsh and estuary are important in the production of marine species such as crabs and oysters that help form the food chain.
