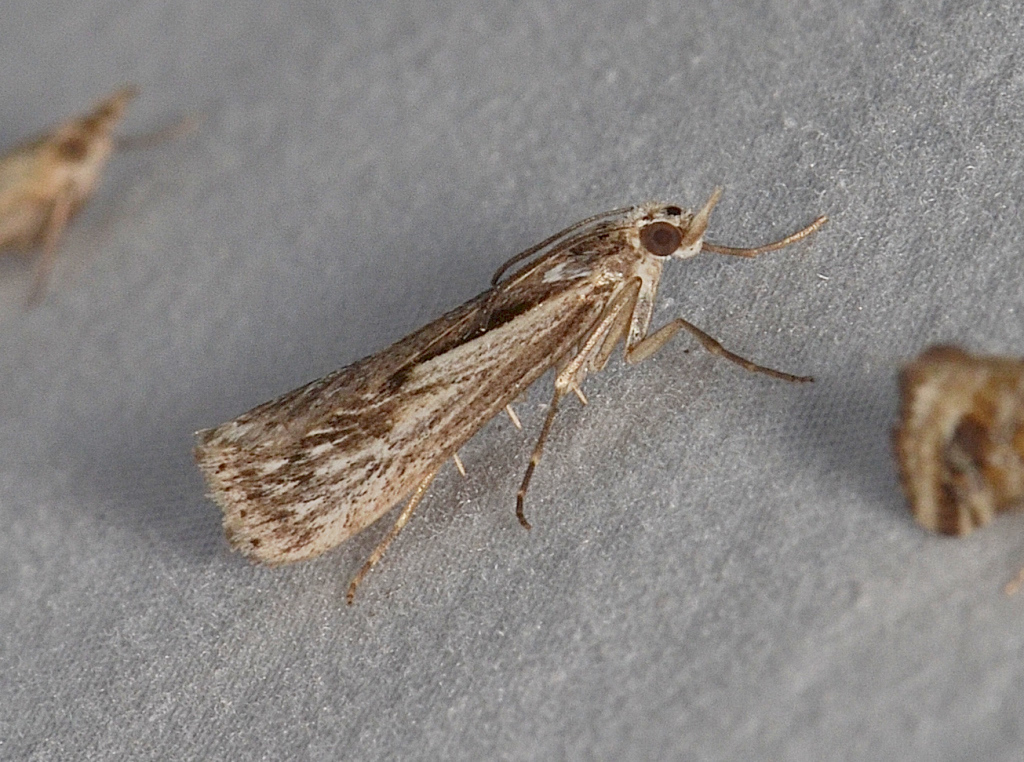

Scientific classification
- Kingdom: Animalia
- Phylum: Arthropoda
- Clade: Pancrustacea
- Class: Insecta
- Order: Lepidoptera
- Family: Crambidae
- Subfamily: Crambinae
- Tribe: Crambini
- Genus: Tawhitia
- Species: T. pentadactylus

Binomial name
- Tawhitia pentadactylus (Zeller, 1863)

Synonyms
- Crambus pentadactylus Zeller, 1863; Argyria pentadactylus; Velasquez pentadactylus; Aphomia strigosa Butler, 1877; Aphomia strigosus Butler, 1877; Aquita claviferella Walker, 1866

= Tawhitia pentadactylus =

Species of moth

Tawhitia pentadactylus is a moth in the family Crambidae. It was described by Zeller in 1863. It is found in Australia (Tasmania) and in New Zealand, where it has been recorded in South Island and the southern part of the North Island. The habitat consists of subalpine swamps.

The wingspan is 29–40 mm for males and 30–36 mm for females. Adults are on wing in October and from December to March.
