= Island Belle =

- U.S. National Register of Historic Places
- Location within Maryland Location within the United States
- Location: Ewell, Smith Island, Maryland
- Coordinates: 37°59′47″N 76°1′44″W
- Area: 0.1 acres (0.040 ha)
- Built: 1916
- NRHP reference No.: 79001141
- Added to NRHP: March 16, 1979

Island Belle is a vessel built in 1916 at Smith Island, Maryland. From 1916 until 1977 this vessel provided the only regular transportation between Smith Island, the state's only "water-locked" settlement, and the mainland.

She was listed on the National Register of Historic Places in 1979.
