= Ewell, Maryland =

Unincorporated community in Maryland, United States

- Unincorporated community
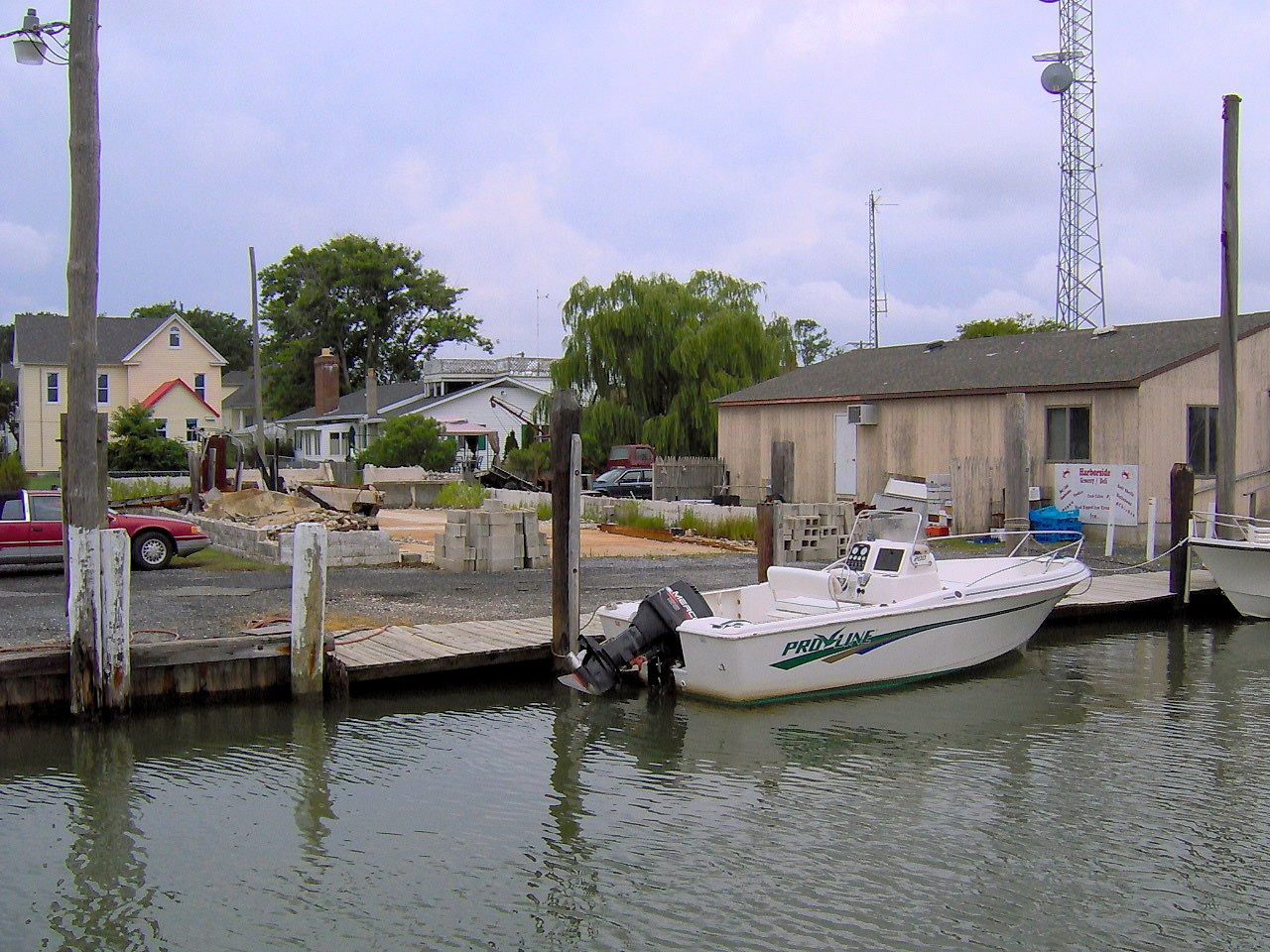
- Harbor at Ewell

- Location within Maryland
- Coordinates: 37°59′44″N 76°02′00″W
- Country: United States
- State: Maryland
- County: Somerset
- Elevation: 0 ft (0 m)
- Time zone: UTC-5 (Eastern (EST))
  - Summer (DST): UTC-4 (EDT)
- ZIP code: 21824
- Area codes: 410, 443, and 667
- GNIS feature ID: 590177

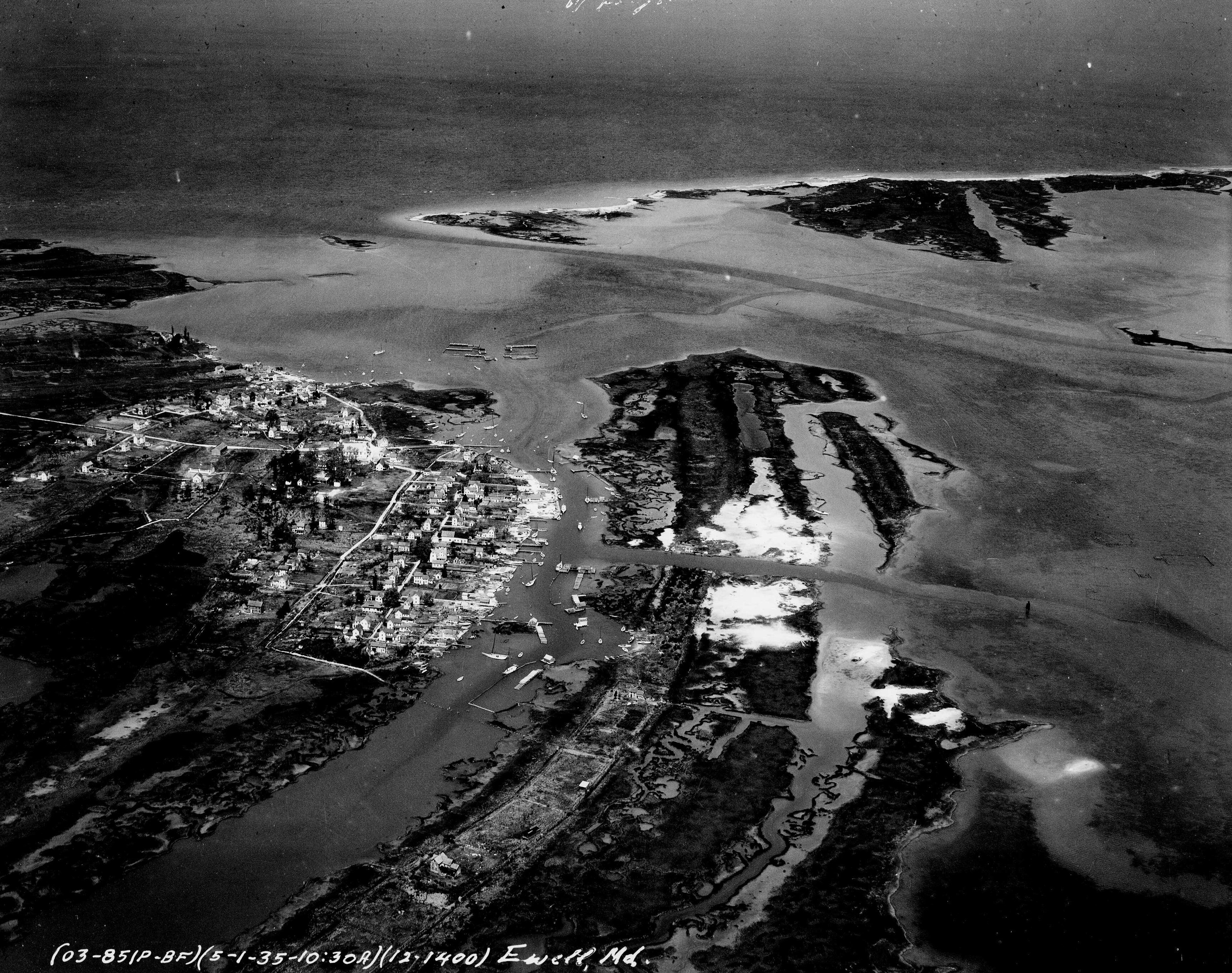
Ewell in the 1930s

Ewell is an unincorporated community located on Smith Island in Somerset County, Maryland, United States.

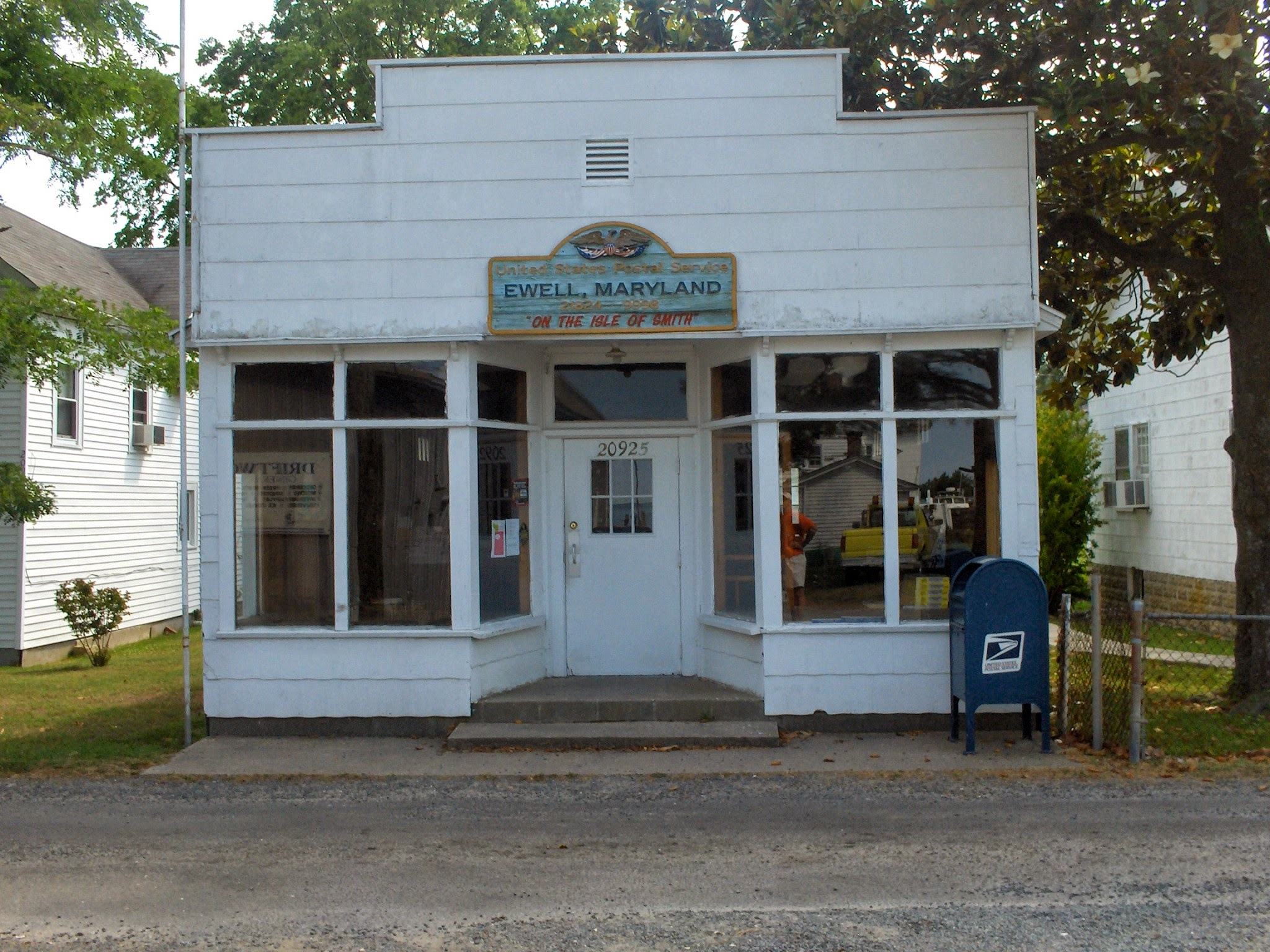
Post office for the small town of Ewell on Smith Island, Maryland
