= Relict =

Surviving remnant of a natural phenomenon

A relict is a surviving remnant of a natural phenomenon.

== Biology ==
A relict is an organism that at an earlier time was abundant in a large area but now occurs at only one or a few small areas.

== Geology and geomorphology ==
In geology, a relict is a structure or mineral from a parent rock that did not undergo metamorphosis when the surrounding rock did, or a rock that survived a destructive geologic process.

In geomorphology, a relict landform is a landform formed by either erosive or constructive surficial processes that are no longer active as they were in the past.

A glacial relict is a cold-adapted organism that is a remnant of a larger distribution that existed in the ice ages.

== Human populations ==
As revealed by DNA testing, a relict population is an ancient people in an area, who have been largely supplanted by a later group of migrants and their descendants.

In various places around the world, minority ethnic groups represent lineages of ancient human migrations in places now occupied by more populous ethnic groups, whose ancestors arrived later. For example, the first human groups to inhabit the Caribbean islands were hunter-gatherer tribes from South and Central America. Genetic testing of natives of Cuba show that, in late pre-Columbian times, the island was home to agriculturalists of Taino ethnicity. In addition, a relict population of the original hunter-gatherers remained in western Cuba as the Ciboney people.

== Other uses ==
- In ecology, an ecosystem which originally ranged over a large expanse, but is now narrowly confined, may be termed a relict.
- In agronomy, a relict crop is a crop which was previously grown extensively, but is now only used in one limited region, or a small number of isolated regions.
- In real estate law, reliction is the gradual recession of water from its usual high-water mark so that the newly uncovered land becomes the property of the adjoining riparian property owner.
- "Relict" was an ancient term still used in colonial (British) America, and in England and Ireland of that era, now archaic, for a widow; it has come to be a generic or collective term for widows and widowers.
- In historical linguistics, a relict is a word that is a survivor of a form or forms that are otherwise archaic.

== See also ==
- The dictionary definition of relict at Wiktionary
- Endemism
- Hysteresis
- Living fossil
- Refugium (population biology)
- Relic
- Palaeochannel
