= Burroughs (surname) =

Burroughs is a surname of French origin. At the time of the British Census of 1881, its relative frequency was highest in Suffolk (8.9 times the British average), followed by Norfolk, Gloucestershire, Shropshire, Huntingdonshire, Somerset, Hampshire, Surrey, Lincolnshire, and Orkney.

== Notable people ==
- Alvin Burroughs (1911–1950), American musician
- Augusten Burroughs (b. 1965), American writer
- Bryson Burroughs (1869–1934), American artist
- Charles Burroughs (1876–1902), American track and field athlete and Olympian
- Derrick Burroughs (b. 1962), American football player and coach
- Diane Burroughs (b. 1960), American television writer
- Dillon Burroughs (b. 1976), American writer
- Don Burroughs (1931–2006), American football player
- Edgar Rice Burroughs (1875–1950), American author, creator of the John Carter of Mars series and the Tarzan series
- Edith Burroughs (b. 1939), American professional bowler
- Edith Woodman Burroughs (1871–1916), American sculptor
- Edward Burroughs (bishop) (1885–1934), English Anglican priest
- Ellen Burroughs, better known as Sophie Jewett (1861–1909), American poet and professor
- Elzy Burroughs (1771/1777–1825), American stonemason, engineer, lighthouse builder, and lighthouse keeper
- Franklin Burroughs (businessman) (1834–1897), American entrepreneur
- Franklin Burroughs (author) (b. ?), American author
- George Burroughs (1650–1692), American Congregational pastor
- Harmon P. Burroughs (1846–1907), American farmer and politician
- Henry Burroughs (1845–1878), American professional baseball player
- Jackie Burroughs (1939–2010), Canadian actress
- Jeff Burroughs (b. 1951), American baseball player
- Jeremiah Burroughs (c. 1600–1646), also written "Jeremiah Burroughes", English Congregationalist and Puritan preacher
- Jerry Burroughs (b. 1967), American politician
- John Burroughs (1837–1921), American naturalist and essayist
- John Burroughs (governor) (1907–1978), American businessman and politician
- Sir John Burroughs (fl. 17th century), English soldier and military commander
- John A. Burroughs Jr. (1936–2014), American government official
- John Coleman Burroughs (1913–1979), American illustrator
- John H. Burroughs (?–?), American and Confederate naval engineer and shipwright
- John J. Burroughs (1798–1872), American lawyer and circuit court clerk
- Jordan Burroughs (b. 1988), American wrestler
- Joseph Burroughs (1685–1761), English Baptist minister
- Kyle Burroughs (b. 1995), Canadian professional ice hockey player
- Lane Burroughs, American college baseball coach
- Nannie Helen Burroughs (1879–1961), American educator, orator, religious leader, and businesswoman
- Robert P. Burroughs (1900–1994), American businessman, political advisor, and statesman
- Sammie Burroughs (born 1973), American football player
- Sean Burroughs (1980–2024), American baseball player
- Sherman E. Burroughs (1903–1992), American naval rear-admiral
- Sherman Everett Burroughs (1870–1923), American politician
- Silas Mainville Burroughs (disambiguation), more than one person with the name
- Stanley Burroughs (1903–1991), American dietary theorist and author
- Theresa Burroughs (1929–2019), American civil rights activist
- Tim Burroughs (b. ?), American basketball player
- Tom Burroughs (b. ?), American politician
- Wilbur Burroughs (1884–1960), American track and field athlete and Olympian
- William Burroughs, more than one person with the name
- William Seward Burroughs I (1855–1898), American inventor
- William S. Burroughs (1914–1997), American author and grandson of William Seward Burroughs
- William S. Burroughs Jr. (1947–1981), also known as William S. Burroughs III, an American author, son of William S. Burroughs, and great-grandson of William Seward Burroughs
- Williana Burroughs (1882–1945), American teacher, communist political activist, and politician
- Margaret Taylor-Burroughs (1917–2010), American artist and writer
- Frederick Traill-Burroughs (1831–1905), British military officer

== Fictional characters ==
- Hilda Burroughs, a character in Robert A. Heinlein's novel The Number of the Beast
- Lord Burroughs, a character in the video game Clock Tower 3
- Maggie Burroughs, a character in the Nightmare on Elm Street series; see List of characters in the Nightmare on Elm Street series

== See also ==
- Burrough, includes a list of people with surname Burrough
- Burroughes, a surname
- Burrowes (surname)
- Burrows (surname)
- Burrow (surname)
