= 2012 New York Yankees season =

Season for the Major League Baseball team the New York Yankees

2012 New York Yankees
- American League East champions
- League: American League
- Division: East
- Ballpark: Yankee Stadium
- City: New York, New York
- Record: 95–67 (.586)
- Divisional place: 1st
- Owners: Yankee Global Enterprises
- General managers: Brian Cashman
- Managers: Joe Girardi
- Television: YES Network; WWOR-TV (Play-by-play: Michael Kay; Analysts: Ken Singleton, David Cone, John Flaherty, Al Leiter, Paul O'Neill, Lou Piniella)
- Radio: New York Yankees Radio Network (John Sterling, Suzyn Waldman)

The 2012 New York Yankees season was the 110th season for the New York Yankees franchise. The Yankees began the season in St. Petersburg, Florida against the Tampa Bay Rays on April 6. They finished the season 95–67, first place in the American League East. They began their post-season run by beating the Baltimore Orioles in five games in the Division Series. They advanced to play the Detroit Tigers in the American League Championship Series, but were swept in four games by the Tigers following a season-ending injury to shortstop and team captain Derek Jeter.

This was the Yankees 20th consecutive winning season, dating back to 1993.

== Personnel moves ==
- On October 31, 2011, the New York Yankees agreed to a contract extension with (LHP) CC Sabathia for 5 years, worth $122M guaranteed. There is also a vesting option for a 6th year that could push the total contract value to $142M.
- On December 9, 2011, the New York Yankees signed (RHP) Freddy Garcia to a one-year contract worth $4M, plus incentives.
- On December 30, 2011, the New York Yankees signed (DH) Andruw Jones to a one-year contract worth $2M, with an extra $1.4M in potential incentives.
- On January 23, the New York Yankees acquired (RHP) Michael Pineda and minor league prospect (RHP) Jose Campos in exchange for top prospect (C) Jesús Montero and (RHP) Hector Noesi.
- On January 24, the Yankees held a press conference officially announcing the retirement of longtime Yankees catcher Jorge Posada.
- On January 26, the New York Yankees signed (RHP) Hiroki Kuroda to a one-year contract worth $10M.
- On February 19, the New York Yankees traded (RHP) A. J. Burnett to the Pirates for $13M cash, minor league pitcher Diego Moreno and minor league outfielder Excardo Ciones.
- On February 21, the New York Yankees signed (DH) Raúl Ibañez to a one-year contract worth $1.1M, with plate appearance incentives bringing the potential value up to a maximum of $4M.
- On February 22, the New York Yankees signed (RHP) David Aardsma to a one-year contract worth $500k, plus another $500k in incentives. The deal also included a club option for 2013 worth $500k.
- On February 27, the New York Yankees signed (INF) Eric Chavez to a one-year contract worth $900k, plus incentives.
- On March 16, the New York Yankees signed (LHP) Andy Pettitte to a one-year Minor League contract, worth $2.5 million.
- July 2012: Yankees acquired Ichiro Suzuki in a trade for two minor league pitchers.
- On August 12, 2012, the New York Yankees signed a contract with right-handed pitcher Derek Lowe.

=== Roster ===
2012 New York Yankees
Roster
Pitchers: 35 David Aardsma; 62 Joba Chamberlain; 38 Cody Eppley; 36 Freddy García; 65 Phil Hughes; 43,41,53 Ryota Igarashi; 18 Hiroki Kuroda; 48 Boone Logan; 34 Derek Lowe; 43 D. J. Mitchell; 47 Iván Nova; 46 Andy Pettitte; 41 David Phelps; 40 Chad Qualls; 39 Clay Rapada; 42 Mariano Rivera; 30 David Robertson; 52 CC Sabathia; 29 Rafael Soriano; 63 Justin Thomas; 53 Cory Wade; 43,61 Adam Warren	Catchers: 40 Francisco Cervelli; 55 Russell Martin; 19 Chris Stewart; Infielders: 24 Robinson Canó; 12 Eric Chavez; 2 Derek Jeter; 45 Casey McGehee; 17 Jayson Nix; 26 Eduardo Núñez; 43 Steve Pearce; 26 Ramiro Peña; 13 Alex Rodriguez; 25 Mark Teixeira	Outfielders: 60 Chris Dickerson; 11 Brett Gardner; 14 Curtis Granderson; 27 Raúl Ibañez; 22 Andruw Jones; 26 Darnell McDonald; 67 Melky Mesa; 31 Ichiro Suzuki; 33 Nick Swisher; 45 DeWayne Wise	Manager: 28 Joe Girardi; Coaches: 57 Mike Harkey (bullpen); 50 Mick Kelleher (1st base); 54 Kevin Long (hitting); 56 Tony Peña (bench); 88 Román Rodríguez (bullpen catcher); 58 Larry Rothschild (pitching); 59 Rob Thomson (3rd base)

=== Starters by position ===
Note: Pos = Position

Pos	Player
C	Russell Martin
1B	Mark Teixeira
2B	Robinson Canó
3B	Alex Rodriguez
SS	Derek Jeter
LF	Brett Gardner
CF	Curtis Granderson
RF	Ichiro Suzuki
DH	Raúl Ibañez

== Regular season ==
=== Season standings ===
==== American League East ====
AL East
Team	W	L	Pct.	GB	Home	Road
New York Yankees	95	67	.586	—	51‍–‍30	44‍–‍37
Baltimore Orioles	93	69	.574	2	47‍–‍34	46‍–‍35
Tampa Bay Rays	90	72	.556	5	46‍–‍35	44‍–‍37
Toronto Blue Jays	73	89	.451	22	41‍–‍40	32‍–‍49
Boston Red Sox	69	93	.426	26	34‍–‍47	35‍–‍46

==== American League Wild Card ====
Division winners
Team	W	L	Pct.
New York Yankees	95	67	.586
Oakland Athletics	94	68	.580
Detroit Tigers	88	74	.543

Wild Card teams (Top 2 teams qualify for postseason)
Team	W	L	Pct.	GB
Texas Rangers	93	69	.574	—
Baltimore Orioles	93	69	.574	—
Tampa Bay Rays	90	72	.556	3
Los Angeles Angels	89	73	.549	4
Chicago White Sox	85	77	.525	8
Seattle Mariners	75	87	.463	18
Toronto Blue Jays	73	89	.451	20
Kansas City Royals	72	90	.444	21
Boston Red Sox	69	93	.426	24
Cleveland Indians	68	94	.420	25
Minnesota Twins	66	96	.407	27

=== Record vs. opponents ===
2012 American League record Source: MLB Standings Grid – 2012
Team	BAL	BOS	CWS	CLE	DET	KC	LAA	MIN	NYY	OAK	SEA	TB	TEX	TOR	NL
Baltimore	–	13–5	6–2	4–4	3–3	5–4	2–7	5–2	9–9	4–5	8–1	10–8	2–5	11–7	11–7
Boston	5–13	–	6–2	5–3	5–5	4–3	0–6	4–3	5–13	1–8	5–4	9–9	2–6	7–11	11–7
Chicago	2–6	2–6	–	11–7	6–12	6–12	3–5	14–4	5–2	3–3	8–1	4–3	6–3	6–4	9–9
Cleveland	4–4	3–5	7–11	–	10–8	8–10	5–4	6–12	1–5	2–8	4–4	4–4	4–5	2–4	8–10
Detroit	3–3	5–5	12–6	8–10	–	13–5	5–5	10–8	4–6	4–3	1–5	5–2	3–7	4–2	11–7
Kansas City	4–5	3–4	12–6	10–8	5–13	–	4–5	7–11	3–4	5–4	1–7	4–2	4–5	2–6	8–10
Los Angeles	7–2	6–0	5–3	4–5	5–5	5–4	–	6–3	4–5	9–10	11–8	1–9	10–9	4–4	12–6
Minnesota	2–5	3–4	4–14	12–6	8–10	11–7	3–6	–	3–4	4–5	2–8	1–5	2–8	2–5	9–9
New York	9–9	13–5	2–5	5–1	6–4	4–3	5–4	4–3	–	5–5	6–3	8–10	4–3	11–7	13–5
Oakland	5–4	8–1	3–3	8–2	3–4	4–5	10–9	5–4	5–5	–	12–7	5–4	11–8	5–4	10–8
Seattle	1–8	4–5	1–8	4–4	5–1	7–1	8–11	8–2	3–6	7–12	–	4–6	9–10	6–3	8–10
Tampa Bay	8–10	9–9	3–4	4–4	2–5	2–4	9–1	5–1	10–8	4–5	6–4	–	5–4	14–4	9–9
Texas	5–2	6–2	3–6	5–4	7–3	5–4	9–10	8–2	3–4	8–11	10–9	4–5	–	6–3	14–4
Toronto	7–11	11–7	4–6	4–2	2–4	6–2	4–4	5–2	7–11	4–5	3–6	4–14	3–6	–	9–9

- Source: MLB Standings Grid – 2012

=== April ===
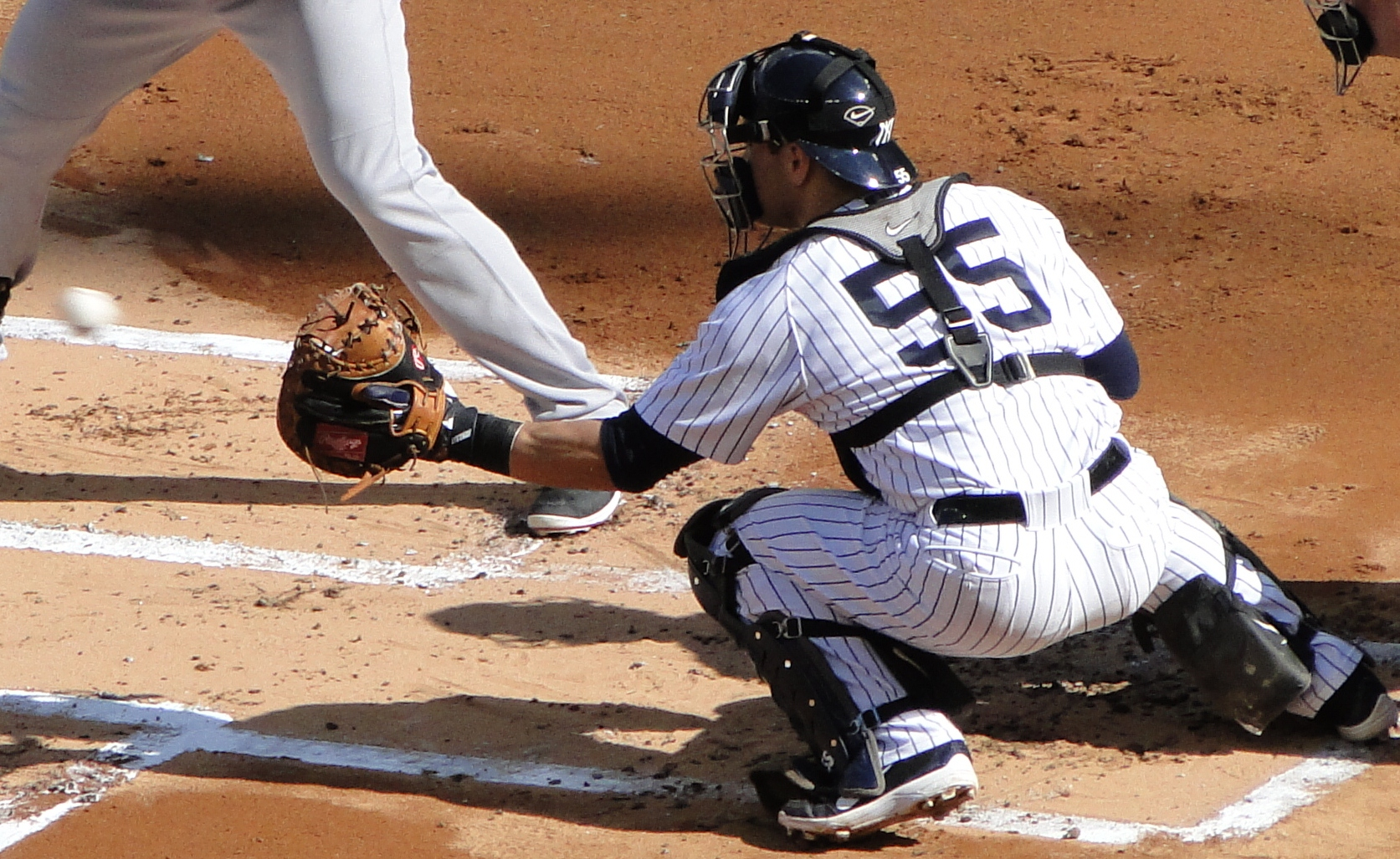
Russell Martin catching a game for the Yankees in 2012.

On April 13 the Yankees won their home opener against the Los Angeles Angels of Anaheim for the 14th time in the last 15 seasons.

On April 20, against their arch-rival Boston Red Sox during the 100th Anniversary of Fenway Park, Alex Rodriguez hit his 631st career home-run, passing former teammate Ken Griffey Jr. for sole possession of 5th on the all-time list.

=== July ===
On July 23, the Yankees agreed to a trade that acquired Ichiro Suzuki from the Seattle Mariners for D. J. Mitchell and Danny Farquhar. On July 27 the Yankees won their 60th game, the first team in the season to do so.

=== October ===
On October 3, during the last game of the season, the Yankees clinched their 18th American League East title when the Baltimore Orioles lost to the Tampa Bay Rays 4–1. The Yankees went on to win their game against the Boston Red Sox, 14–2, giving them the best record in the American League, and home-field advantage for the American League playoffs.

== Game log ==
Legend
Yankees win	Yankees loss	Game postponed

Game Log
April (13−9)

#	Date	Opponent	Score	Win	Loss	Save	Attendance	Record	Boxscore
1	April 6	@ Rays	6–7	Rodney (1–0)	Rivera (0–1)		34,078	0–1	L1
2	April 7	@ Rays	6–8	Price (1–0)	Kuroda (0–1)	Rodney (1)	34,078	0–2	L2
3	April 8	@ Rays	0–3	Hellickson (1–0)	Hughes (0–1)	Rodney (2)	30,413	0–3	L3
4	April 9	@ Orioles	6–2	Nova (1–0)	Matusz (0–1)		25,478	1–3	W1
5	April 10	@ Orioles	5–4 (12)	Rapada (1–0)	Strop (0–1)	Rivera (1)	24,659	2–3	W2
6	April 11	@ Orioles	6–4 (10)	Soriano (1–0)	Gregg (0–1)	Rivera (2)	22,919	3–3	W3
7	April 13	Angels	5–0	Kuroda (1–1)	Santana (0–2)		49,386	4–3	W4
8	April 14	Angels	1–7	Wilson (2–0)	Hughes (0–2)		46,829	4–4	L1
9	April 15	Angels	11–5	Nova (2–0)	Williams (0–1)		41,055	5–4	W1
10	April 16	Twins	3–7	Pavano (1–1)	García (0–1)		40,218	5–5	L1
11	April 17	Twins	8–3	Sabathia (1–0)	Liriano (0–2)		40,194	6–5	W1
12	April 18	Twins	5–6	Marquis (1–0)	Kuroda (1–2)	Capps (3)	36,831	6–6	L1
13	April 19	Twins	7–6	Hughes (1–2)	Swarzak (0–3)	Rivera (3)	40,327	7–6	W1
14	April 20	@ Red Sox	6–2	Nova (3–0)	Buchholz (1–1)		36,770	8–6	W2
15	April 21	@ Red Sox	15–9	Soriano (2–0)	Aceves (0–1)		37,839	9–6	W3
—	April 22	@ Red Sox	Game Postponed (rain) (rescheduled July 7)						
16	April 23	@ Rangers	7–4	Sabathia (2–0)	Holland (2–1)	Rivera (4)	48,234	10–6	W4
17	April 24	@ Rangers	0–2	Darvish (3–0)	Kuroda (1–3)	Nathan (5)	47,085	10–7	L1
18	April 25	@ Rangers	3–7	Ross (4–0)	Hughes (1–3)		47,942	10–8	L2
19	April 27	Tigers	7–6	Rivera (1–1)	Villarreal (0–1)		41,200	11–8	W1
20	April 28	Tigers	5–7	Smyly (1–0)	García (0–2)		44,686	11–9	L1
21	April 29	Tigers	6–2	Sabathia (3–0)	Scherzer (1–3)		43,084	12–9	W1
22	April 30	Orioles	2–1	Kuroda (2–3)	Hammel (3–1)	Rivera (5)	36,890	13–9	W2

May (14−14)

#	Date	Opponent	Score	Win	Loss	Save	Attendance	Record	Boxscore
23	May 1	Orioles	1−7	Matusz (1−3)	Hughes (1–4)		37,790	13–10	L1
24	May 2	Orioles	0−5	Arrieta (2−2)	Nova (3–1)		39,360	13–11	L2
25	May 3	@ Royals	3−4	Duffy (2−2)	Phelps (0−1)	Broxton (5)	19,590	13−12	L3
26	May 4	@ Royals	6−2	Sabathia (4–0)	Chen (0−4)		24,153	14−12	W1
27	May 5	@ Royals	1−5	Paulino (1–0)	Kuroda (2–4)		29,121	14−13	L1
28	May 6	@ Royals	10−4	Hughes (2–4)	Hochevar (2−3)		20,434	15−13	W1
29	May 8	Rays	5−3	Nova (4–1)	Shields (5–1)	Robertson (1)	37,086	16−13	W2
30	May 9	Rays	1−4	Rodney (2–0)	Robertson (0–1)		38,024	16−14	L1
31	May 10	Rays	5−3	Sabathia (5–0)	Price (5–2)	Soriano (1)	37,720	17−14	W1
32	May 11	Mariners	6–2	Kuroda (3–4)	Hernández (3–2)		37,226	18−14	W2
33	May 12	Mariners	6–2	Hughes (3–4)	Noesí (2–4)	Logan (1)	43,954	19–14	W3
34	May 13	Mariners	2–6	Millwood (1–4)	Pettitte (0–1)		41,631	19–15	L1
35	May 14	@ Orioles	8–5	Phelps (1−1)	Ayala (1−1)	Soriano (2)	16,492	20–15	W1
36	May 15	@ Orioles	2–5	Chen (4–0)	Sabathia (5–1)	Johnson (12)	24,055	20–16	L1
37	May 16	@ Blue Jays	1–8	Drabek (3–4)	Kuroda (3–5)		28,915	20–17	L2
38	May 17	@ Blue Jays	1–4	Hutchison (3–1)	Hughes (3–5)	Janssen (3)	31,266	20–18	L3
39	May 18	Reds	4–0	Pettitte (1–1)	Arroyo (2–2)		42,015	21–18	W1
40	May 19	Reds	5–6	Bailey (2–3)	Nova (4–2)	Arredondo (1)	45,302	21–19	L1
41	May 20	Reds	2–5	Cueto (5–1)	Sabathia (5–2)	Chapman (1)	45,622	21–20	L2
42	May 21	Royals	0–6	Paulino (2–1)	Kuroda (3–6)		39,229	21–21	L3
43	May 22	Royals	3–2	Hughes (4–5)	Hochevar (3−5)	Soriano (3)	37,674	22–21	W1
44	May 23	Royals	8–3	Pettitte (2–1)	Smith (0–1)		40,407	23–21	W2
45	May 25	@ Athletics	6–3	Nova (5–2)	Ross (2–5)	Soriano (4)	33,559	24–21	W3
46	May 26	@ Athletics	9–2	Sabathia (6–2)	Colón (4–5)		27,112	25–21	W4
47	May 27	@ Athletics	2–0	Kuroda (4–6)	Milone (6–4)	Soriano (5)	25,078	26–21	W5
48	May 28	@ Angels	8–9	Walden (2–1)	Wade (0–1)		44,016	26–22	L1
49	May 29	@ Angels	1–5	Haren (3–5)	Pettitte (2–2)		42,065	26–23	L2
50	May 30	@ Angels	6–5	Nova (6–2)	Takahashi (0–2)	Soriano (6)	40,111	27–23	W1

June (20–7)

#	Date	Opponent	Score	Win	Loss	Save	Attendance	Record	Boxscore
51	June 1	@ Tigers	9–4	Sabathia (7–2)	Crosby (0–1)	Soriano (7)	41,831	28–23	W2
52	June 2	@ Tigers	3–4	Valverde (3–1)	Phelps (1−2)		44,593	28–24	L1
53	June 3	@ Tigers	5–1	Hughes (5–5)	Verlander (5–4)		42,419	29–24	W1
54	June 5	Rays	7–0	Pettitte (3–2)	Shields (6–4)		40,537	30–24	W2
55	June 6	Rays	4–1	Nova (7–2)	Cobb (2–2)	Soriano (8)	38,370	31–24	W3
56	June 7	Rays	3–7	Price (8–3)	Sabathia (7–3)		39,891	31–25	L1
57	June 8	Mets	9–1	Kuroda (5–6)	Santana (3–3)		48,566	32–25	W1
58	June 9	Mets	4–2	Hughes (6–5)	Gee (4–4)	Soriano (9)	48,575	33–25	W2
59	June 10	Mets	5–4	Logan (1–0)	Rauch (3–6)		49,010	34–25	W3
60	June 11	@ Braves	3–0	Nova (8–2)	Delgado (4–6)		42,669	35–25	W4
61	June 12	@ Braves	6–4	Sabathia (8–3)	Venters (3–3)	Soriano (10)	41,452	36–25	W5
62	June 13	@ Braves	3–2	Kuroda (6–6)	Hudson (4–3)	Soriano (11)	48,938	37–25	W6
63	June 15	@ Nationals	7–2	Hughes (7–5)	Gonzalez (8–3)		41,406	38–25	W7
64	June 16	@ Nationals	5–3 (14)	García (1–2)	Lidge (0–1)	Soriano (12)	41,287	39–25	W8
65	June 17	@ Nationals	4–1	Nova (9–2)	Jackson (3–4)	Soriano (13)	41,442	40–25	W9
66	June 18	Braves	6–2	Sabathia (9–3)	Minor (3–5)		42,709	41–25	W10
67	June 19	Braves	3–4	Hudson (5–3)	Kuroda (6–7)	Kimbrel (20)	41,219	41–26	L1
68	June 20	Braves	5–10	Hanson (8–4)	Hughes (7–6)		45,094	41–27	L2
69	June 22	@ Mets	4–6	Niese (5–3)	Pettitte (3–3)	Francisco (18)	40,191	41–28	L3
70	June 23	@ Mets	4–3	Rapada (2–0)	Rauch (3–7)	Soriano (14)	42,122	42–28	W1
71	June 24	@ Mets	6–5	Logan (2–0)	Batista (1–2)	Soriano (15)	42,364	43–28	W2
72	June 25	Indians	7–1	Kuroda (7–7)	Tomlin (3–5)		42,290	44–28	W3
73	June 26	Indians	6–4	Hughes (8–6)	Masterson (4–7)	Soriano (16)	43,006	45–28	W4
74	June 27	Indians	5–4	García (2–2)	Jiménez (7–6)	Soriano (17)	45,099	46–28	W5
75	June 28	White Sox	3–4	Santiago (2–1)	Robertson (0–2)	Reed (11)	44,041	46–29	L1
76	June 29	White Sox	7–14	Quintana (3–1)	Phelps (1−3)		44,265	46–30	L2
77	June 30	White Sox	4–0	Kuroda (8–7)	Peavy (6–5)		46,895	47–30	W1

July (13–13)

#	Date	Opponent	Score	Win	Loss	Save	Attendance	Record	Boxscore
78	July 1	White Sox	4–2	Hughes (9–6)	Floyd (6–8)	Soriano (18)	48,324	48–30	W2
79	July 2	@ Rays	3–4	Moore (5–5)	Robertson (0–3)	Rodney (23)	21,742	48–31	L1
80	July 3	@ Rays	4–7	Shields (8–5)	Nova (9–3)	Rodney (24)	26,453	48–32	L2
81	July 4	@ Rays	4–3	Logan (3–0)	Farnsworth (0–1)	Soriano (19)	28,033	49–32	W1
82	July 6	@ Red Sox	10–8	Logan (4–0)	Miller (2–1)	Soriano (20)	38,066	50–32	W2
83	July 7	@ Red Sox	6–1	García (3–2)	Morales (1–2)		38,170	51–32	W3
84	July 7	@ Red Sox	5–9	Doubront (9–4)	Hughes (9–7)		37,791	51–33	L1
85	July 8	@ Red Sox	7–3	Nova (10–3)	Lester (5–6)		38,270	52–33	W1
All-Star Break: NL defeats AL 8–0
86	July 13	Angels	6–5	Qualls (2–1)	Downs (1–1)	Soriano (21)	47,873	53–33	W2
87	July 14	Angels	5–3	García (4–2)	Williams (6–6)	Soriano (22)	47,789	54–33	W3
88	July 15	Angels	8–10	Weaver (11–1)	Nova (10–4)	Jepsen (1)	46,679	54–34	L1
89	July 16	Blue Jays	6–3	Robertson (1–3)	Loup (0–1)		42,819	55–34	W1
90	July 17	Blue Jays	6–1	Sabathia (10–3)	Cecil (2–2)	Soriano (24)	44,975	56–34	W2
91	July 18	Blue Jays	6–0 (7)	Kuroda (9–7)	Romero (8–6)		45,986	57–34	W3
92	July 19	@ Athletics	3–4	Griffin (2–0)	García (4–3)	Cook (10)	23,382	57–35	L1
93	July 20	@ Athletics	2–3	Cook (4–2)	Eppley (0–1)		24,148	57–36	L2
94	July 21	@ Athletics	1–2	Parker (7–4)	Hughes (9–8)	Doolittle (1)	28,142	57–37	L3
95	July 22	@ Athletics	4–5 (12)	Blevins (3–0)	Eppley (0–2)		30,470	57–38	L4
96	July 23	@ Mariners	4–1	Kuroda (10–7)	Millwood (3–8)	Soriano (25)	29,911	58–38	W1
97	July 24	@ Mariners	2–4	Hernández (9–5)	García (4–4)	Wilhelmsen (11)	31,908	58–39	L1
98	July 25	@ Mariners	5–2	Phelps (2–3)	Luetge (1–1)	Soriano (26)	36,071	59–39	W1
99	July 27	Red Sox	10–3	Hughes (10–8)	Cook (2–4)		49,571	60–39	W2
100	July 28	Red Sox	6–8	Miller (3–1)	Soriano (2–1)	Aceves (22)	49,573	60–40	L1
101	July 29	Red Sox	2–3 (10)	Aceves (2–6)	Robertson (1–4)		48,526	60–41	L2
102	July 30	Orioles	4–5	González (3–2)	García (4–5)	Johnson (31)	43,052	60–42	L3
103	July 31	Orioles	5–11	Tillman (4–1)	Nova (10–5)		42,821	60–43	L4

August (15–13)

#	Date	Opponent	Score	Win	Loss	Save	Attendance	Record	Boxscore
104	August 1	Orioles	12–3	Hughes (11–8)	Britton (1–1)		44,593	61–43	W1
105	August 3	Mariners	6–3	Sabathia (11–3)	Millwood (4–9)		45,872	62–43	W2
106	August 4	Mariners	0–1	Hernández (10–5)	Kuroda (10–8)		47,067	62–44	L1
107	August 5	Mariners	6–2	García (5–5)	Iwakuma (2–3)		45,878	63–44	W1
108	August 6	@ Tigers	2–7	Verlander (12–7)	Nova (10–6)		41,381	63–45	L1
109	August 7	@ Tigers	5–6	Porcello (9–6)	Hughes (11–9)	Valverde (22)	39,760	63–46	L2
110	August 8	@ Tigers	12–8	Sabathia (12–3)	Sánchez (6–9)		41,879	64–46	W1
111	August 9	@ Tigers	4–3	Rapada (3–0)	Benoit (1–3)	Soriano (27)	40,940	65–46	W2
112	August 10	@ Blue Jays	10–4	García (6–5)	Romero (8–9)		41,610	66–46	W3
113	August 11	@ Blue Jays	5–2	Nova (11–6)	Laffey (3–3)	Soriano (28)	45,582	67–46	W4
114	August 12	@ Blue Jays	7–10	Happ (8–10)	Hughes (11–10)	Janssen (15)	43,924	67–47	L1
115	August 13	Rangers	8–2	Phelps (3–3)	Dempster (6–6)	Lowe (1)	45,676	68–47	W1
116	August 14	Rangers	3–0	Kuroda (11–8)	Harrison (13–7)		44,533	69–47	W2
117	August 15	Rangers	3–2	García (7–5)	Feldman (6–8)	Soriano (29)	45,921	70–47	W3
118	August 16	Rangers	6–10	Scheppers (1–0)	Logan (4–1)		47,645	70–48	L1
119	August 17	Red Sox	6–4	Hughes (12–10)	Morales (3–4)	Soriano (30)	49,422	71–48	W1
120	August 18	Red Sox	1–4	Lester (7–10)	Phelps (3–4)	Aceves (25)	49,466	71–49	L1
121	August 19	Red Sox	4–1	Kuroda (12–8)	Beckett (5–11)	Soriano (31)	48,620	72–49	W1
122	August 20	@ White Sox	6–9	Myers (2–5)	Logan (4–2)	Reed (22)	27,561	72–50	L1
123	August 21	@ White Sox	3–7	Liriano (5–10)	Nova (11–7)		24,247	72–51	L2
124	August 22	@ White Sox	1–2	Sale (15–4)	Hughes (12–11)	Reed (23)	26,319	72–52	L3
125	August 24	@ Indians	3–1	Sabathia (13–3)	Allen (0–1)	Soriano (32)	27,986	73–52	W1
126	August 25	@ Indians	1–3	Masterson (10–11)	Kuroda (12–9)	Perez (33)	34,374	73–53	L1
127	August 26	@ Indians	4–2	Logan (5–2)	Jiménez (9–13)	Soriano (33)	26,166	74–53	W1
128	August 27	Blue Jays	7–8 (11)	Oliver (3–2)	Lowe (8–11)		42,962	74–54	L1
129	August 28	Blue Jays	2–1	Hughes (13–11)	Romero (8–12)	Soriano (34)	42,472	75–54	W1
130	August 29	Blue Jays	5–8	Happ (10–10)	Sabathia (13–4)	Janssen (17)	46,010	75–55	L1
131	August 31	Orioles	1–6	González (6–3)	Kuroda (12–10)		43,352	75–56	L2

September–October (20–11)

#	Date	Opponent	Score	Win	Loss	Save	Attendance	Record	Boxscore
132	September 1	Orioles	4–3	Logan (6–2)	Chen (12–8)	Soriano (35)	46,122	76–56	W1
133	September 2	Orioles	3–8	Wolf (4–10)	Hughes (13–12)		46,501	76–57	L1
134	September 3	@ Rays	3–4	Shields (13–8)	Robertson (1–5)	Rodney (41)	28,585	76–58	L2
135	September 4	@ Rays	2–5	Cobb (9–8)	García (7–6)	Rodney (42)	17,652	76–59	L3
136	September 5	@ Rays	6–4	Kuroda (13–10)	Moore (10–9)	Soriano (36)	16,711	77–59	W1
137	September 6	@ Orioles	6–10	O'Day (7–1)	Robertson (1–6)		46,298	77–60	L1
138	September 7	@ Orioles	8–5	Hughes (14–12)	Chen (12–9)		40,861	78–60	W1
139	September 8	@ Orioles	4–5	Saunders (8–11)	Sabathia (13–5)	Johnson (42)	46,067	78–61	L1
140	September 9	@ Orioles	13–3	Chamberlain (1–0)	Britton (5–2)		40,346	79–61	W1
141	September 11	@ Red Sox	3–4	Bailey (1–0)	Robertson (1–7)		37,437	79–62	L1
142	September 12	@ Red Sox	5–4	Phelps (4–4)	Cook (3–10)	Soriano (37)	37,230	80–62	W1
143	September 13	@ Red Sox	2–0	Hughes (15–12)	Doubront (10–9)	Soriano (38)	38,134	81–62	W2
144	September 14	Rays	4–6	Price (18–5)	Sabathia (13–6)	Rodney (43)	45,200	81–63	L1
145	September 15	Rays	5–3	Nova (12–7)	Shields (14–9)	Soriano (39)	46,856	82–63	W1
146	September 16	Rays	6–4	Kuroda (14–10)	Moore (10–11)	Soriano (40)	43,489	83–63	W2
	September 18	Blue Jays	Game Postponed (rain) (rescheduled September 19)						
147	September 19	Blue Jays	4–2	Pettitte (4–3)	Álvarez (9–13)	Soriano (41)	39,859	84–63	W3
148	September 19	Blue Jays	2–1	Eppley (1–2)	Delabar (4–3)	Soriano (42)	39,997	85–63	W4
149	September 20	Blue Jays	10–7	Hughes (16–12)	Laffey (3–6)	Robertson (2)	40,511	86–63	W5
150	September 21	Athletics	2–1 (10)	Robertson (2–7)	Doolittle (1–1)		40,759	87–63	W6
151	September 22	Athletics	10–9 (14)	Wade (1–1)	Ross (2–10)		44,026	88–63	W7
152	September 23	Athletics	4–5	Blevins (5–1)	Kuroda (14–11)	Balfour (20)	43,867	88–64	L1
153	September 24	@ Twins	6–3	Pettitte (5–3)	Hendriks (1–8)		33,720	89–64	W1
154	September 25	@ Twins	4–5	Fien (2–1)	Hughes (16–13)	Perkins (15)	33,346	89–65	L1
155	September 26	@ Twins	8–2	Sabathia (14–6)	Duensing (4–11)		33,251	90–65	W1
156	September 27	@ Blue Jays	0–6	Morrow (9–7)	Nova (12–8)		23,060	90–66	L1
157	September 28	@ Blue Jays	11–4	Kuroda (15–11)	Jenkins (0–3)		25,785	91–66	W1
158	September 29	@ Blue Jays	2–3	Hill (1–0)	Pettitte (5–4)	Janssen (21)	36,139	91–67	L1
159	September 30	@ Blue Jays	9–6	Logan (7–2)	Oliver (3–4)		31,418	92–67	W1
160	October 1	Red Sox	10–2	Sabathia (15–6)	Buchholz (11–8)		45,478	93–67	W2
161	October 2	Red Sox	4–3 (12)	Lowe (9–11)	Miller (3–2)		41,564	94–67	W3
162	October 3	Red Sox	14–2	Kuroda (16–11)	Matsuzaka (1–7)		47,393	95–67	W4

== Player stats ==
=== Batting ===
Note: G = Games played; AB = At bats; R = Runs; H = Hits; 2B = Doubles; 3B = Triples; HR = Home runs; RBI = Runs batted in; SB = Stolen bases; BB = Walks; AVG = Batting average; SLG = Slugging average

Player	G	AB	R	H	2B	3B	HR	RBI	SB	BB	AVG	SLG
Derek Jeter	159	683	99	216	32	0	15	58	9	45	.316	.429
Robinson Canó	161	627	105	196	48	1	33	94	3	61	.313	.550
Curtis Granderson	160	596	102	138	18	4	43	106	10	75	.232	.492
Nick Swisher	148	537	75	146	36	0	24	93	2	77	.272	.473
Alex Rodriguez	122	463	74	126	17	1	18	57	13	51	.272	.430
Mark Teixeira	123	451	66	113	27	1	24	84	2	54	.251	.475
Russell Martin	133	422	50	89	18	0	21	53	6	53	.211	.403
Raúl Ibañez	130	384	50	92	19	3	19	62	3	35	.240	.453
Eric Chavez	113	278	36	78	12	0	16	37	0	30	.281	.496
Andruw Jones	94	233	27	46	7	0	14	34	0	28	.197	.408
Ichiro Suzuki	67	227	28	73	13	1	5	27	14	5	.322	.454
Jayson Nix	74	177	24	43	13	0	4	18	6	14	.243	.384
Chris Stewart	55	141	15	34	8	0	1	13	2	10	.241	.319
Eduardo Núñez	38	89	14	26	4	1	1	11	11	6	.292	.393
DeWayne Wise	55	61	11	16	3	1	3	8	7	2	.262	.492
Casey McGehee	22	53	9	8	3	0	1	6	0	5	.151	.264
Brett Gardner	16	31	7	10	2	0	0	3	2	5	.323	.387
Steve Pearce	12	25	6	4	0	0	1	4	0	5	.160	.280
Chris Dickerson	25	14	5	4	0	0	2	5	3	3	.286	.714
Ramiro Peña	3	4	0	1	0	0	0	0	0	0	.250	.250
Darnell McDonald	4	4	0	0	0	0	0	0	0	0	.000	.000
Melky Mesa	3	2	0	1	0	0	0	1	0	0	.500	.500
Francisco Cervelli	3	1	1	0	0	0	0	0	0	1	.000	.000
Pitcher totals	162	21	0	2	0	0	0	0	0	0	.095	.095
Team totals	162	5524	804	1462	280	13	245	774	93	565	.265	.453

=== Pitching ===
Note: W = Wins; L = Losses; ERA = Earned run average; G = Games pitched; GS = Games started; SV = Saves; IP = Innings pitched; H = Hits allowed; R = Runs allowed; ER = Earned runs allowed; BB = Walks allowed; SO = Strikeouts

Player	W	L	ERA	G	GS	SV	IP	H	R	ER	BB	SO
Hiroki Kuroda	16	11	3.32	33	33	0	219.2	205	86	81	51	167
CC Sabathia	15	6	3.38	28	28	0	200.0	184	89	75	44	197
Phil Hughes	16	13	4.19	32	32	0	191.1	196	101	89	46	165
Iván Nova	12	8	5.02	28	28	0	170.1	194	100	95	56	153
Freddy García	7	6	5.20	30	17	0	107.1	112	64	62	35	89
David Phelps	4	4	3.34	33	11	0	99.2	81	38	37	38	96
Andy Pettitte	5	4	2.87	12	12	0	75.1	65	26	24	21	69
Rafael Soriano	2	1	2.26	69	0	42	67.2	55	17	17	24	69
David Robertson	2	7	2.67	65	0	2	60.2	52	19	18	19	81
Boone Logan	7	2	3.74	80	0	1	55.1	48	23	23	28	68
Cody Eppley	1	2	3.33	59	0	0	46.0	46	19	17	17	32
Cory Wade	1	1	6.46	39	0	0	39.0	46	29	28	8	38
Clay Rapada	3	0	2.82	70	0	0	38.1	29	14	12	17	38
Derek Lowe	1	1	3.04	17	0	1	23.2	24	9	8	6	14
Joba Chamberlain	1	0	4.35	22	0	0	20.2	26	11	10	6	22
Mariano Rivera	1	1	2.16	9	0	5	8.1	6	2	2	2	8
Chad Qualls	1	0	6.14	8	0	0	7.1	10	5	5	3	2
D. J. Mitchell	0	0	3.86	4	0	0	4.2	7	2	2	3	2
Justin Thomas	0	0	9.00	4	0	0	3.0	2	3	3	1	3
Ryota Igarashi	0	0	12.00	2	0	0	3.0	4	4	4	3	3
Adam Warren	0	0	23.14	1	1	0	2.1	8	6	6	2	1
David Aardsma	0	0	9.00	1	0	0	1.0	1	1	1	1	1
DeWayne Wise	0	0	0.00	1	0	0	0.2	0	0	0	0	0
Team totals	95	67	3.84	162	162	51	1445.1	1401	668	617	431	1318

=== Postseason game log ===
Legend
Yankees win	Yankees loss	Game postponed

2012 Postseason Game Log
ALDS vs Orioles (Yankees win series 3–2)

#	Date	Opponent	Score	Win	Loss	Save	Attendance	Record	Boxscore
1	October 7	@ Orioles	7–2	Sabathia (1–0)	Johnson (0–1)		47,841	1–0	W1
2	October 8	@ Orioles	2–3	Chen (1–0)	Pettitte (0–1)	Johnson (1)	48,187	1–1	L1
3	October 10	Orioles	3–2 (12)	Robertson (1–0)	Matusz (0–1)		50,497	2–1	W1
4	October 11	Orioles	1–2 (13)	Strop (1–0)	Phelps (0−1)	Johnson (2)	49,307	2–2	L1
5	October 12	Orioles	3–1	Sabathia (2–0)	Hammel (0–1)		47,081	3–2	W1

ALCS vs Tigers (Yankees lose series 0–4)

#	Date	Opponent	Score	Win	Loss	Save	Attendance	Record	Boxscore
1	October 13	Tigers	4–6 (12)	Smyly (1–0)	Phelps (0–1)		47,122	0–1	L1
2	October 14	Tigers	0–3	Sánchez (1–0)	Kuroda (0–1)	Coke (1)	47,082	0–2	L2
3	October 16	@ Tigers	1–2	Verlander (1–0)	Hughes (0–1)	Coke (2)	42,970	0–3	L3
—	October 17	@ Tigers	Game Postponed (rain) (rescheduled October 18)						
4	October 18	@ Tigers	1–8	Scherzer (1–0)	Sabathia (0–1)		42,477	0–4	L4

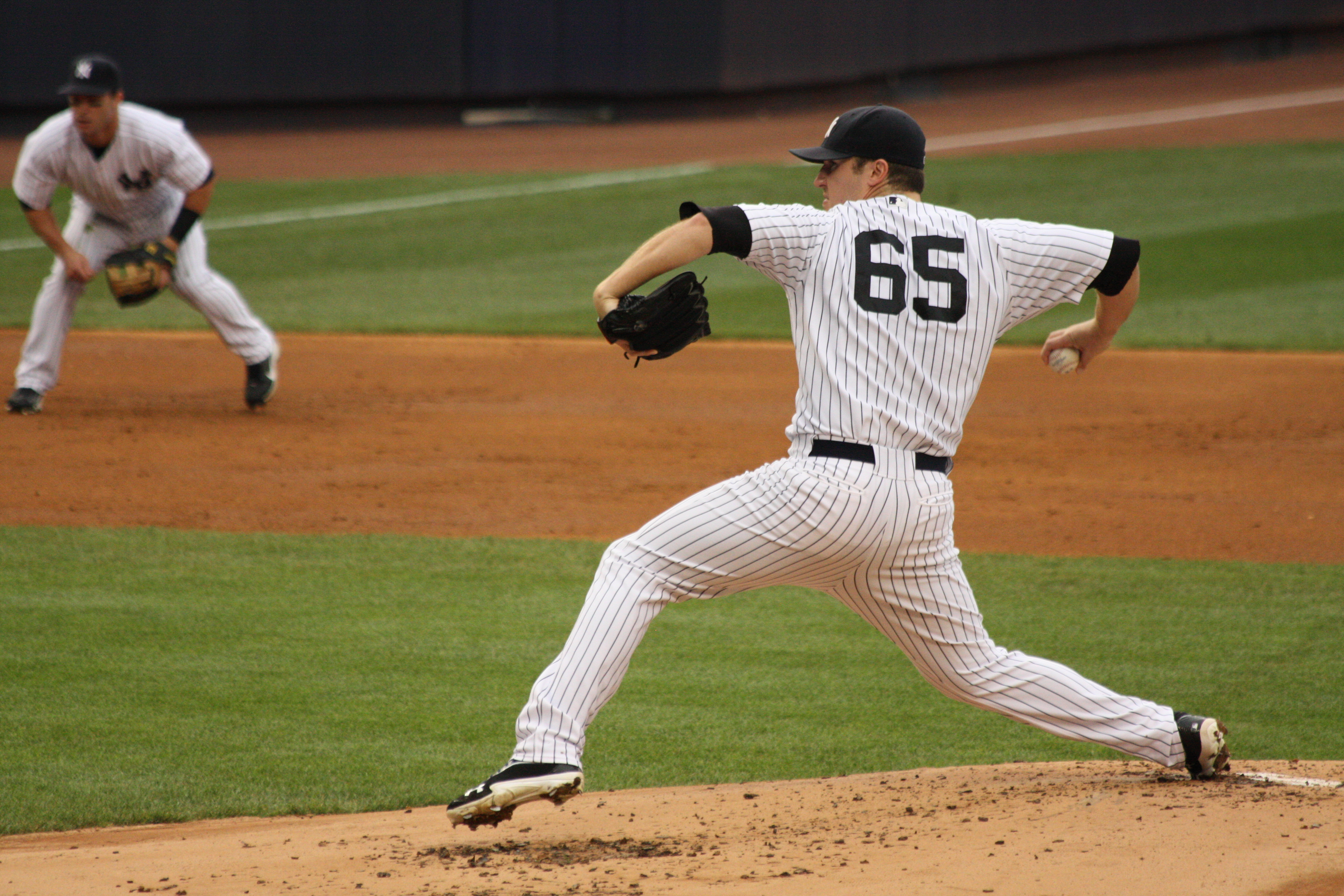
Phil Hughes won 16 games in 2012, his best since winning 18 in 2010 for New York.

== Postseason ==
=== Division Series ===
The Yankees took on the Baltimore Orioles in the Division Series.

==== Game 1, October 7 ====
6:07 p.m. (EDT) at Oriole Park at Camden Yards in Baltimore, Maryland (moved to 8:47 p.m. EDT due to rain delay)

Team	1	2	3	4	5	6	7	8	9	R	H	E
New York	1	0	0	1	0	0	0	0	5	7	10	1
Baltimore	0	0	2	0	0	0	0	0	0	2	8	1
WP: CC Sabathia (1–0) LP: Jim Johnson (0–1); Home runs: NYY: Russell Martin (1); BAL: None

The Yankees struck first in the first inning when Derek Jeter singled and Ichiro Suzuki doubled scoring Jeter for the game's first run, giving the Yankees a 1–0 lead. In the bottom of the 3rd inning Orioles outfielder Chris Davis singled, followed by a Lew Ford single, a Robert Andino sac fly, and a single by Nate McLouth gave the O's a 2–1 lead. Then in the top of the 4th the Yankees tied the game at 2 with a Mark Teixeira single with two men on. The game remained tied going into the ninth inning until a lead off home run by Russell Martin pushed the Yankees ahead 3–2. Singles by Raúl Ibañez, Derek Jeter, and Ichiro Suzuki all singled back-to-back-to-back scoring Ibañez giving the Yanks 4–2 lead. Canó doubled scoring Jeter and Suzuki. Nick Swisher hit a sac fly to score Cano, making the score 7–2. David Robertson came on to get the final out of the game, giving the Yankees the win and a one-game to nothing lead.

==== Game 2, October 8 ====
8:07 p.m. (EDT) at Oriole Park at Camden Yards in Baltimore, Maryland (moved to 8:47 p.m. EDT due to rain delay)

Team	1	2	3	4	5	6	7	8	9	R	H	E
New York	1	0	0	0	0	0	1	0	0	2	9	2
Baltimore	0	0	2	0	0	1	0	0	X	3	7	2
Starting pitchers: NYY: Andy Pettitte (0–0); BAL: Wei-Yin Chen (0–0); WP: Wei-Yin Chen (1–0) LP: Andy Pettitte (0–1) Sv: Jim Johnson (1)

==== Game 3, October 10 ====
7:37 p.m. (EDT) at Yankee Stadium in Bronx, New York

Team	1	2	3	4	5	6	7	8	9	10	11	12	R	H	E
Baltimore	0	0	1	0	1	0	0	0	0	0	0	0	2	6	0
New York	0	0	1	0	0	0	0	0	1	0	0	1	3	7	1
Starting pitchers: BAL: Miguel González (0–0); NYY: Hiroki Kuroda (0–0); WP: David Robertson (1–0) LP: Brian Matusz (0–1); Home runs: BAL: Ryan Flaherty (1), Manny Machado (1); NYY: Raúl Ibañez 2 (2)

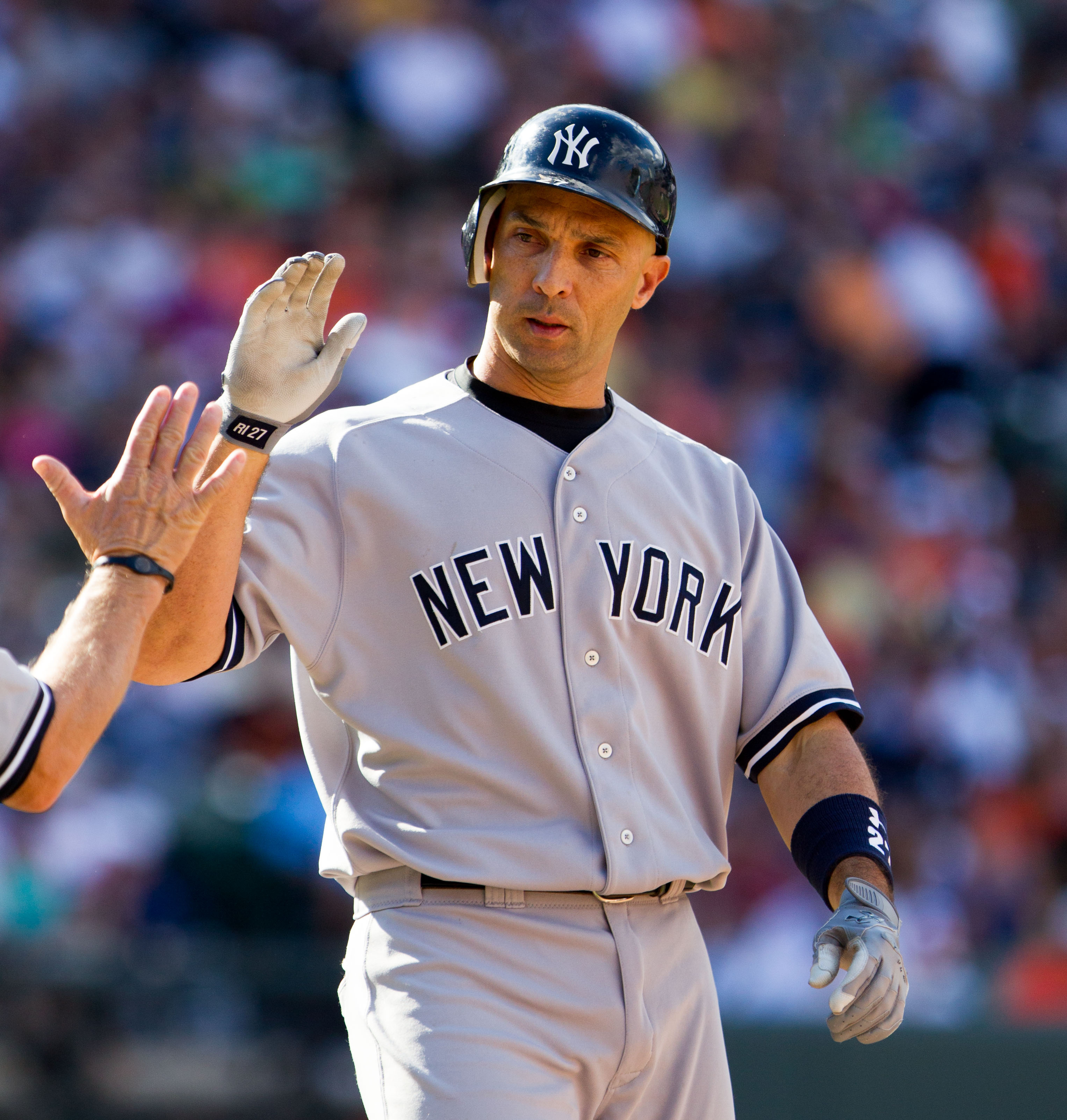
Raúl Ibañez would set history in the 2012 MLB postseason after playing a huge role in the Yankees' 2012 season with the injury to Brett Gardner.

Baltimore got on the board first with a Ryan Flaherty solo home run in the top of the third inning, giving the Orioles a 1–0 lead. In the bottom half of the inning, the Yankees got on the board with Russell Martin double followed by a Derek Jeter triple tying the game at 1. The game remained tied until the top of the fifth inning when a Manny Machado solo home run gave the Orioles a 2–1 lead. The score remained the same until the bottom of the ninth inning, when Yankees manager Joe Girardi pinch hit Raúl Ibañez for Alex Rodriguez. On the second pitch of the at bat, Ibañez crushed a home run into the right field bleachers to tie the game at 2. The score remained 2–2 going into the bottom of the 12th inning, until Ibañez came up to bat again crushing a walk-off home run into the upper deck in right field, giving the Yankees a 3–2 victory and a 2–1 lead in the series. Raúl Ibañez became the first player in Major League history to homer twice in a postseason game that he did not start.

==== Game 4, October 11 ====
7:37 p.m. (EDT) at Yankee Stadium in Bronx, New York

Team	1	2	3	4	5	6	7	8	9	10	11	12	13	R	H	E
Baltimore	0	0	0	0	1	0	0	0	0	0	0	0	1	2	8	1
New York	0	0	0	0	0	1	0	0	0	0	0	0	0	1	7	0
Starting pitchers: BAL: Joe Saunders (0–0); NYY: Phil Hughes (0–0); WP: Pedro Strop (1–0) LP: David Phelps (0–1) Sv: Jim Johnson (2); Home runs: BAL: Nate McLouth (1); NYY: None

==== Game 5, October 12 ====
5:07 p.m. (EDT) at Yankee Stadium in Bronx, New York

Team	1	2	3	4	5	6	7	8	9	R	H	E
Baltimore	0	0	0	0	0	0	0	1	0	1	4	0
New York	0	0	0	0	1	1	1	0	0	3	5	0
Starting pitchers: BAL: Jason Hammel (0–0); NYY: CC Sabathia (1–0); WP: CC Sabathia (1–0) LP: Jason Hammel (0–1); Home runs: BAL: None; NYY: Curtis Granderson (1)

The Yankees clinched a trip to the ALCS for the third time in four years with a 3–1 win. CC Sabathia gave the Yankees his second big performance of the series, pitching a complete game, giving up one run on four hits while striking out nine. The only nervous moments came in the sixth, when a long fly ball by Nate McLouth just barely went foul and the eighth, when the Orioles loaded the bases with one out, but Sabathia got out of the jam by striking out McLouth and getting J. J. Hardy to ground out.

The Yankees scored first in the fifth, when Game 3 hero Raúl Ibañez singled to score Mark Teixeira. The Yankees tacked on some insurance in the sixth on an Ichiro Suzuki double and a Curtis Granderson home run in the seventh. It proved enough, as CC got Matt Wieters to ground out for the final out, sending the Yankees to a chance to play for the pennant versus the Detroit Tigers.

=== American League Championship Series ===
The Yankees were defeated by the Detroit Tigers in the Championship Series.

==== Game 1 ====
Saturday, October 13, 2012 – 8:07 p.m. (EDT) at Yankee Stadium in Bronx, New York

Team	1	2	3	4	5	6	7	8	9	10	11	12	R	H	E
Detroit	0	0	0	0	0	2	0	2	0	0	0	2	6	15	1
New York	0	0	0	0	0	0	0	0	4	0	0	0	4	11	0
Starting pitchers: DET: Doug Fister (0–0); NYY: Andy Pettitte (0–0); WP: Drew Smyly (1–0) LP: David Phelps (0–1); Home runs: DET: Delmon Young (1); NYY: Ichiro Suzuki (1), Raúl Ibañez (1)

The Yankees managed to come back from a 4–0 deficit in the 9th inning to tie it. The rally culminated with a Raul Ibanez 2-run home run. However, the rally would stall there. Then, during extra innings, Yankees shortstop Derek Jeter broke his left ankle while diving for a groundball in the 12th inning. The Yankees were already down 5–4 at that point, and the Yankees would later lose the game. The injury would haunt the Yankees for the rest of the series.

==== Game 2 ====
Sunday, October 14, 2012 – 4:07 p.m. (EDT) at Yankee Stadium in Bronx, New York

Team	1	2	3	4	5	6	7	8	9	R	H	E
Detroit	0	0	0	0	0	0	1	2	0	3	8	1
New York	0	0	0	0	0	0	0	0	0	0	4	0
Starting pitchers: DET: Aníbal Sánchez (0–0); NYY: Hiroki Kuroda (0–0); WP: Aníbal Sánchez (1–0) LP: Hiroki Kuroda (0–1) Sv: Phil Coke (1)

==== Game 3 ====
Tuesday, October 16, 2012 – 8:07 p.m. (EDT) at Comerica Park in Detroit, Michigan

Team	1	2	3	4	5	6	7	8	9	R	H	E
New York	0	0	0	0	0	0	0	0	1	1	5	1
Detroit	0	0	0	1	1	0	0	0	X	2	7	0
Starting pitchers: NYY: Phil Hughes (0–0); DET: Justin Verlander (0–0); WP: Justin Verlander (1–0) LP: Phil Hughes (0–1) Sv: Phil Coke (2); Home runs: NYY: Eduardo Núñez (1); DET: Delmon Young (2)

==== Game 4 ====
Thursday, October 18, 2012 – 4:07 p.m. (EDT) at Comerica Park in Detroit, Michigan, originally scheduled for Wednesday, October 17, 2012 – 8:07 p.m. (EDT) and was postponed due to rain

Team	1	2	3	4	5	6	7	8	9	R	H	E
New York	0	0	0	0	0	1	0	0	0	1	2	2
Detroit	1	0	1	4	0	0	1	1	X	8	16	1
WP: Max Scherzer (1–0) LP: CC Sabathia (0–1); Home runs: NYY: None; DET: Miguel Cabrera (1), Jhonny Peralta 2 (2), Austin Jackson (1)

== Farm system ==
Level	Team	League	Manager
AAA	Empire State Yankees	International League	Dave Miley
AA	Trenton Thunder	Eastern League	Tony Franklin
A	Tampa Yankees	Florida State League	Luis Sojo
A	Charleston RiverDogs	South Atlantic League	Carlos Mendoza
A-Short Season	Staten Island Yankees	New York–Penn League	Justin Pope
Rookie	GCL Yankees	Gulf Coast League	Tom Nieto
