= Burrough =

Burrough is a surname. Notable people with the surname include:

- Bryan Burrough (b. 1961), American author and magazine correspondent
- Edward Burrough (1634–1663), English Quaker leader and controversialist
- Harold Burrough (1889–1977), British naval officer
- James Burrough (disambiguation), more than one person with the name
- John Burrough (disambiguation), more than one person with the name
- Ken Burrough (1948–2022), American football player
- William Burrough (disambiguation), more than one person with the name

== See also ==
- Burroughs (surname)
- Burrow (surname)
