= John Burroughs (disambiguation) =

John Burroughs (1837–1921) was an American naturalist and nature essayist.

John Burroughs may also refer to:

== People ==
- Sir John Burroughs, 17th-century English soldier
- Sir John Borough or Burroughs (died 1643), Garter Principal King at Arms, a ceremonial position in the United Kingdom
- John Burroughs (governor) (1907–1978), American businessman and governor of New Mexico
- John A. Burroughs, Jr. (born 1936), American ambassador
- John C. Burroughs (1818–1892), American educator from New York
- John Coleman Burroughs (1913–1979), American illustrator
- John H. Burroughs, naval engineer and shipwright
- John J. Burroughs (1798–1872), American lawyer

== Schools in the United States ==
- John Burroughs High School, Burbank, California, a public high school
- John Burroughs School, Ladue, Missouri, a private, non-sectarian college-preparatory school

== Other uses ==
- John Burroughs Medal, awarded annually by the John Burroughs Association to an author of a book on natural history
- John Burroughs, a character in Another Earth, a 2011 American science fiction film

== See also ==
- John Burrough (disambiguation)
- John Burrows (disambiguation)
