= William Burrows =

William Burrows may refer to:

- William Ward Burrows I (Marine lieutenant colonel) (1768–1805), second Commandant of the Marine Corps
- William Ward Burrows II (Navy lieutenant) (1785–1813), colonel's son
- USS William Ward Burrows, a transport ship with the United States Navy
- William E. Burrows, co-founder of the Alliance to Rescue Civilization
- William Eugene Burrows, birth name of Billy Drago (1945–2019), American actor
- William Burrows (cricketer) (1844–unknown), English cricketer

== See also ==
- William Burroughs (disambiguation)
- William Burrough (disambiguation)
