= D. J. Mitchell =

D. J. Mitchell may refer to:

- D. J. Mitchell (baseball) (born 1987), American baseball player
- D. J. Mitchell (basketball) (born 1997), American basketball player
