= John Burrow =

John Burrow may refer to:

- J. W. Burrow (John Wyon Burrow), English historian of intellectual history
- John F. Burrow, American politician in Mississippi
- John Burrow (literary scholar), British scholar of English literature

== See also ==
- John Burrows (disambiguation)
