= John Burrough =

John Burrough may refer to:

- John Burrough (American football) – Former American football player
- John Burrough (Cambridge University cricketer) (1873–1922), played for Cambridge University 1893–95 then other teams
- John Burrough (Gloucestershire cricketer) (1904–1969), played for Oxford University 1924–26 and Gloucestershire 1924–37
- John Burrough (rower) in 1938 British Empire Games
- John Paul Burrough, Bishop of Mashonaland

== See also ==
- John Burroughs (disambiguation)
