= Cody Eppley =

American baseball player (born 1985)

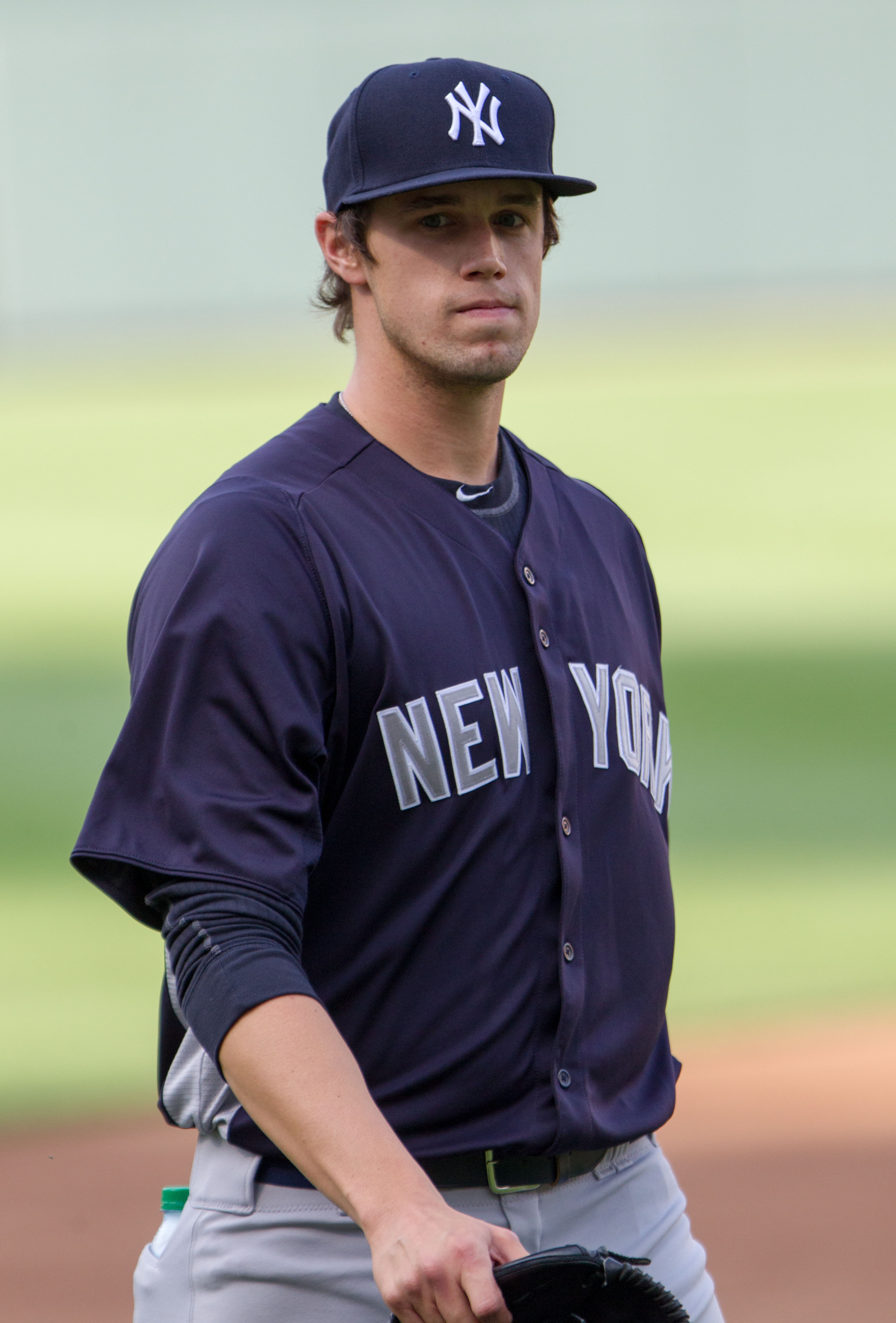
- Eppley with the New York Yankees
- Pitcher
- Born: October 8, 1985 (age 40); Dillsburg, Pennsylvania, U.S.
- Batted: Right Threw: Right

MLB debut
- April 23, 2011, for the Texas Rangers

Last MLB appearance
- April 3, 2013, for the New York Yankees

MLB statistics
- Win–loss record: 2–3
- Earned run average: 4.61
- Strikeouts: 39
- Stats at Baseball Reference

Teams
- Texas Rangers (2011); New York Yankees (2012–2013)

Cody Allen Eppley (born October 8, 1985) is an American former professional baseball pitcher and coach. He played in Major League Baseball (MLB) for the Texas Rangers and New York Yankees.

== Amateur career ==
Eppley attended Northern High School in Dillsburg, Pennsylvania, where he pitched for the school's baseball team. He then enrolled at Virginia Commonwealth University (VCU), where he played college baseball for the VCU Rams baseball team, competing in the Colonial Athletic Association.

== Professional career ==
=== Texas Rangers ===
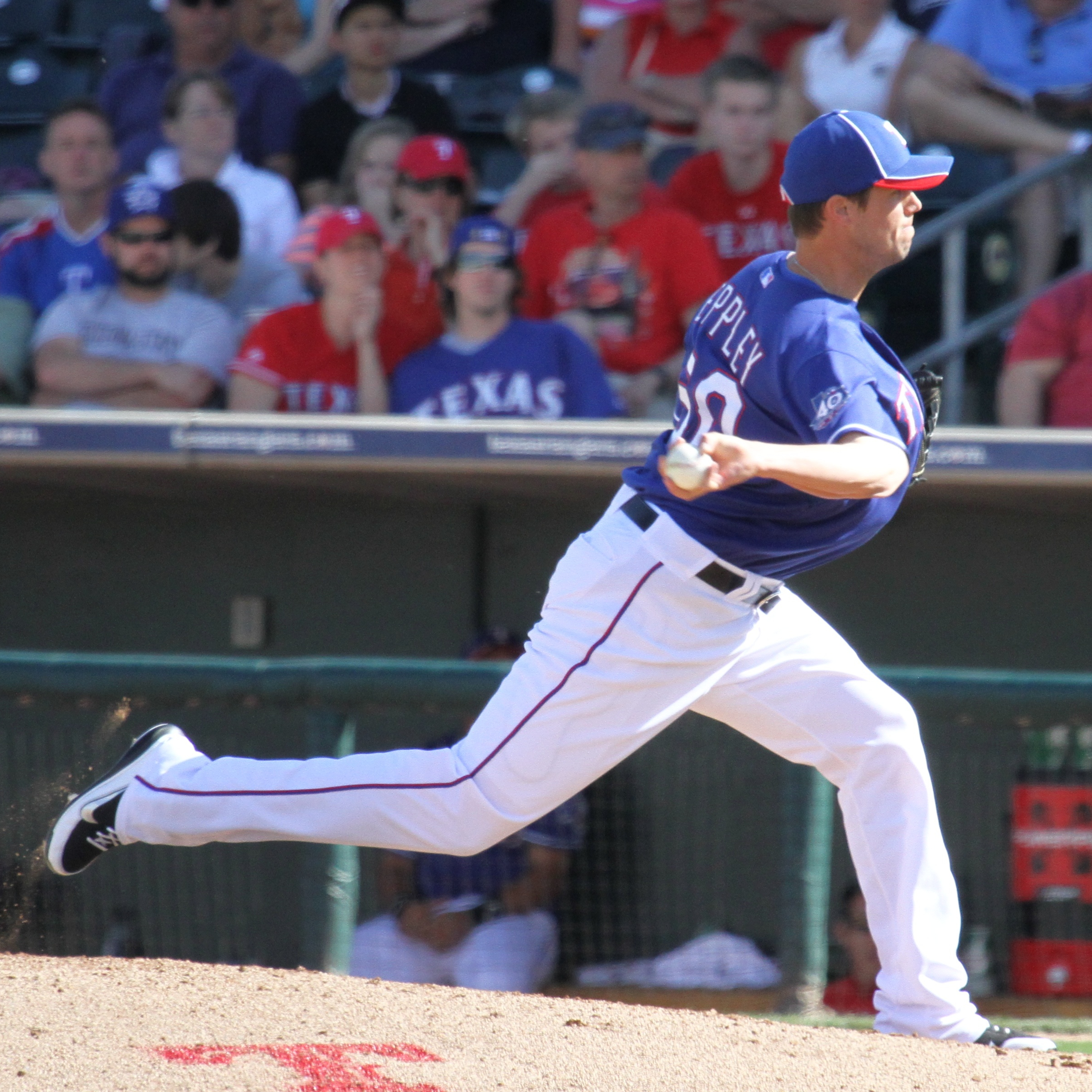
Eppley pitching for the Texas Rangers in 2012 spring training.

The Texas Rangers drafted Eppley in the 43rd round of the 2008 Major League Baseball draft. He pitched to a 2.10 ERA with 34 strikeouts in 25.2 innings for the Arizona Rangers of the Rookie-level Arizona League and was named a Post-Season All-Star. Eppley was promoted to the Clinton LumberKings of the Class A Midwest League in late August that year. He next played for the Hickory Crawdads of the Class A South Atlantic League in 2009, pitching to a 2.93 ERA in 67.2 innings out of the bullpen.

Eppley started the 2010 season with the Bakersfield Blaze of the Class A-Advanced California League, allowing no runs in 18 innings. He was then promoted to the Frisco RoughRiders of the Class AA Texas League in May and Oklahoma City RedHawks of the Class AAA Pacific Coast League (PCL) in July. He finished the season with a 2.08 ERA and 82 strikeouts in 69.1 innings that year, and was named the organization's Minor League Reliever of the Year Award.

In 2011, he was assigned to the Round Rock Express, the Rangers' new PCL affiliate. Eppley was called up to the majors for the first time on April 23, 2011. He made his major league debut that day, throwing two innings against the Kansas City Royals. After allowing eight runs in nine innings, he was optioned back to the minors on May 23. Eppley served as the co-closer for the Express, alongside Pedro Strop, and was named a PCL Mid-Season All-Star. The Rangers designated Eppley for assignment at the end of spring training in 2012.

=== New York Yankees ===
On April 5, 2012, the Yankees claimed Eppley off waivers. He started the 2012 season with the Scranton/Wilkes-Barre Yankees of the Class AAA International League and was recalled him on April 19. He was optioned to Scranton/Wilkes-Barre after long reliever D. J. Mitchell was recalled to the Yankees on April 29. On May 4, Eppley was called back up to the parent club, along with outfielder DeWayne Wise, after pitcher Mariano Rivera sustained an Anterior cruciate ligament tear. He was optioned back to Scranton/Wilkes-Barre on May 13, but was recalled just two days later to replace David Robertson, who strained an oblique muscle. Eppley, along with fellow sidearm pitcher Clay Rapada, were used heavily during the 2012 season. He finished the regular season with a 3.33 ERA in 49 innings across 59 games. The Yankees did not include Eppley on their roster for the 2012 American League Division Series against the Baltimore Orioles. However, he replaced Eduardo Nunez on the roster for the 2012 American League Championship Series against the Detroit Tigers. He pitched in all four games, allowing four hits and a walk while striking out four in 3.2 innings of work.

Eppley made the Yankees' Opening Day roster in 2013, despite allowing nine runs and 14 hits in eight innings. He gave up four runs in 1.2 innings to begin the year and was optioned to Triple-A. After pitching to an 8.53 ERA with Scranton/Wilkes-Barre through 19 games in the 2013 season, the Yankees released Eppley on June 5.

=== Minnesota Twins ===
On June 14, the Minnesota Twins signed Eppley to a minor league contract, and assigned him to the Triple-A Rochester Red Wings of the International League. He opted out of his contract August 21. In 22 appearances with Rochester, Eppley finished 2–0 with a 4.88 ERA, striking out 20 in 24 innings.

=== Lancaster Barnstormers ===
Eppley made six appearances with the Lancaster Barnstormers of the Atlantic League of Professional Baseball in September, going 0–1, giving up one run in 4.1 innings with four strikeouts. Despite now pitching in independent baseball, Eppley said, "being able to get out and wake up every morning and go to the ballpark, that's what it's all about."

=== Pittsburgh Pirates ===
Eppley signed a minor league deal with the Pittsburgh Pirates on November 26, 2013. Eppley gave up two runs in 5.2 innings over seven appearances, with three saves, in spring training. He began the 2014 season with Triple-A Indianapolis, where he compiled a 2–1 record with a 6.43 ERA in 13 games. On June 19, Eppley was released by the Pirates.

=== Lancaster Barnstormers (second stint) ===
Eppley returned to the Barnstormers for the remainder of the 2014. He went 4-0 with a 1.59 ERA out of the bullpen as the Barnstormers captured the Atlantic League Championship.

=== Southern Maryland Blue Crabs ===
Eppley signed with the Southern Maryland Blue Crabs for the 2015 season and was an Atlantic League All-Star. He returned for the 2016 season and was again named an All-Star. He re-signed with the team for the 2017 season and was again named an All-Star. Eppley re-signed with the team for the 2018 season. He became a free agent following the 2018 season.

=== Lancaster Barnstormers (third stint) ===
Eppley signed with the Lancaster Barnstormers of the Atlantic League of Professional Baseball for the 2019 season and served as the team's closer. He became a free agent following the season.

== Coaching career ==
On March 12, 2020, Eppley announced his retirement as an active player, and signed on as pitching coach for the Lancaster Barnstormers. He did not return for the 2021 season and instead began working in the financial sector.

== Pitching style ==
Eppley threw with an unusual sidearm delivery. He changed his arm slot starting in spring training before the 2009 season. By 2010, he was throwing that way full time. He threw a four-seam fastball and sinker in the high 80s. He also had a slider in the low 80s and an occasional changeup. Eppley's low arm slot made him very effective against right-handed batters, but also largely ineffective against left-handed batters. It also allowed him to generate a very large number of ground balls.

== Personal life ==
Cody and his wife Caitlin were married on November 21, 2020. He has a brother, Nate Eppley, who was a pitcher out of Rider University and was drafted by the Oakland Athletics in the 29th round of the 2011 Major League Baseball draft.
