= DeWayne Wise =

American baseball player (born 1978)

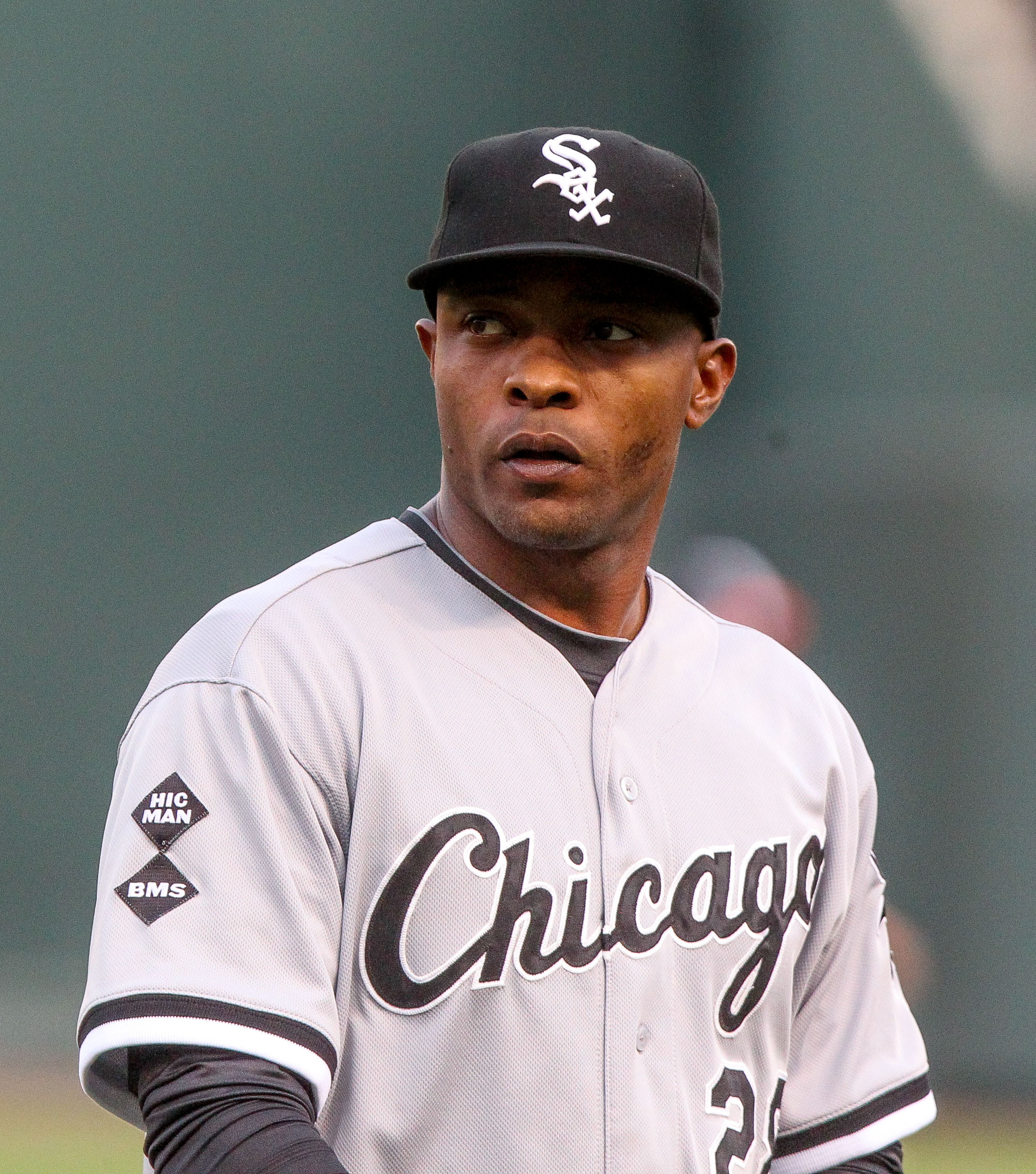
- Dewayne Wise with the Chicago White Sox
- Outfielder
- Born: February 24, 1978 (age 48); Chapin, South Carolina, U.S.
- Batted: Left Threw: Left

MLB debut
- April 6, 2000, for the Toronto Blue Jays

Last MLB appearance
- May 29, 2013, for the Chicago White Sox

MLB statistics
- Batting average: .228
- Home runs: 31
- Runs batted in: 115
- Stats at Baseball Reference

Teams
- Toronto Blue Jays (2000, 2002); Atlanta Braves (2004); Cincinnati Reds (2006–2007); Chicago White Sox (2008–2009); Toronto Blue Jays (2010); Florida Marlins (2011); Toronto Blue Jays (2011); New York Yankees (2012); Chicago White Sox (2012–2013)

Larry DeWayne Wise (born February 24, 1978) is an American former professional baseball outfielder. He graduated from Chapin High School in 1997 and was selected by the Cincinnati Reds in the fifth round (158th overall) of the 1997 Major League Baseball draft. He played in Major League Baseball (MLB) for the Toronto Blue Jays, Atlanta Braves, Cincinnati Reds, Chicago White Sox, Florida Marlins, and New York Yankees. He is best known for robbing Gabe Kapler of a home run to preserve Mark Buehrle's perfect game in 2009.

== Professional career ==
=== Toronto Blue Jays (2000–2002) ===
Wise was claimed by the Toronto Blue Jays on December 13, 1999, in the Rule 5 draft without having played a game for the Reds. He made his major league debut for the Blue Jays on April 6, 2000 against the Kansas City Royals, entering as a defensive replacement in center field and grounding out in his first at-bat. He struggled to make an impact at the big-league level in 2000, appearing in just 28 games and batting .136 before being sent back to the minors.

After spending the entire 2001 season in the Toronto minor league system, Wise was recalled to the majors in 2002. He appeared in 42 games and hit his first career home run during this time on July 24. However, Wise was later demoted to Triple-A again, largely due to his .179 batting average. He became a free agent after the 2003 season, which he spent entirely in Syracuse, the Blue Jays' Triple-A affiliate.

=== Atlanta Braves (2004) ===
On October 25, 2003, Wise signed as a minor league free agent with the Atlanta Braves. He impressed in the Braves' minor league system, batting a combined .309 between the Single-A Rome Braves, Single-A Advanced Myrtle Beach Pelicans, and Triple-A Richmond Braves, earning a call up and his next shot at the big leagues. Wise batted .228 with six home runs and 17 RBI in 77 games for the Braves in 2004. After the season, the Braves placed Wise on waivers.

=== Detroit Tigers (2005) ===
On October 15, 2004, Wise was claimed by the Detroit Tigers. He spent the entire 2005 season with the Toledo Mud Hens, the Tigers' Triple-A affiliate, where he batted .234 with eight home runs and 34 RBI in 108 games.

=== Cincinnati Reds (2006–2007) ===
The next team to sign Wise was the team who had drafted him in the first place, the Cincinnati Reds. Wise spent the majority of the 2006 season with the Triple-A Louisville Bats, but he did appear in 31 games at MLB level, batting .184 with an RBI. The Reds re-signed Wise to a minor league contract for the 2007 season on January 9, 2007. He again spent most of the season in Triple-A, making just five appearances in the majors. He was released and granted free agency on October 1, 2007.

=== Chicago White Sox (2008–2009) ===
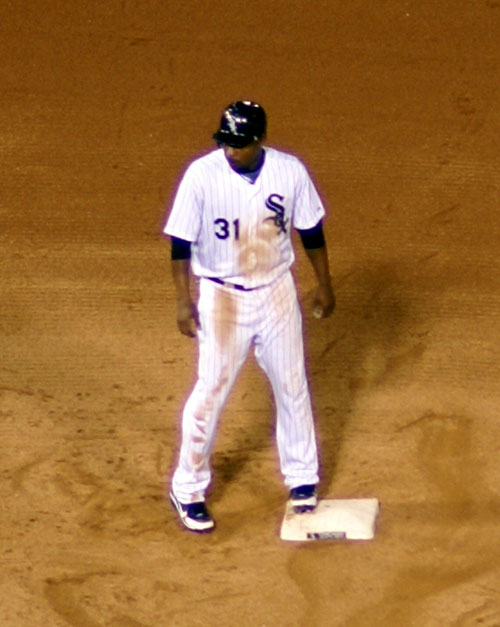
Wise playing for the Chicago White Sox in 2008

After the Reds had opted not to re-sign him and with offers not flooding in, Wise began to explore the possibility of playing in the independent baseball leagues. However, he received a call from Chicago White Sox and signed a minor league deal on March 5, 2008. The Triple-A Charlotte Knights were the next stop on his journeyman career. He was called up the major leagues when Juan Uribe went on the disabled list in May, but was used sparingly before being designated for assignment. When Paul Konerko, the White Sox first baseman went on the disabled list in late July, Wise was selected for promotion, due to his .319 batting average in Charlotte, ahead of prospect Jerry Owens.

Wise was used mostly as a reserve outfielder/defensive replacement for Ken Griffey Jr., but impressed at the plate, hitting .288 with two homers and seven runs batted in 35 games before straining his adductor muscle on August 20. He was placed on the disabled list on August 25 to make room for Joe Crede. After recovering, Wise's big break came when White Sox All-Star left fielder Carlos Quentin fractured his wrist after fouling off a pitch on September 5. Quentin would miss the rest of the season, and Wise took Quentin's position in left field.

The White Sox were locked in a tight race for the AL Central with the Minnesota Twins and Wise contributed to the Sox eventually winning the division (after a one-game play-off). He picked the perfect moment to hit his first career grand slam, a go-ahead, pinch-hit shot in the eighth inning to beat the Detroit Tigers 11–7 on September 14, 2008.

The White Sox made the postseason where they lost to the Tampa Bay Rays in four games. Wise batted .286 with a homer and 5 RBI during the 2008 ALDS.

On December 12, 2008, Wise agreed to a one-year deal worth $550,000 with the White Sox after he had batted .248 with six homers and 18 runs batted in 57 games in 2008. Wise was named by manager Ozzie Guillén as the White Sox opening day center fielder and leadoff hitter for the 2009 season after impressing during spring training. However, just seven games into the season, he separated his shoulder while making a diving, bases-loaded catch, saving at least two runs. The catch helped preserve a 10–6 Chicago win, but the resulting injury kept Wise on the disabled list until May 29.

On July 23, 2009, at U. S. Cellular Field, Wise was put in by Guillén as a ninth-inning defensive substitute, and promptly robbed the Rays' Gabe Kapler of a home run with a spectacular, juggling catch, preserving Mark Buehrle's perfect game. To thank Wise for his play, Mark Buehrle gave him a bottle of Crown Royal XR in a cloth bag embroidered with his name and the date of the perfect game.

On July 30, 2009, at the team's first home game after the perfect game, the White Sox unveiled a sign reading "The Catch" at the top of the left field wall, at the location where Wise had made his catch.

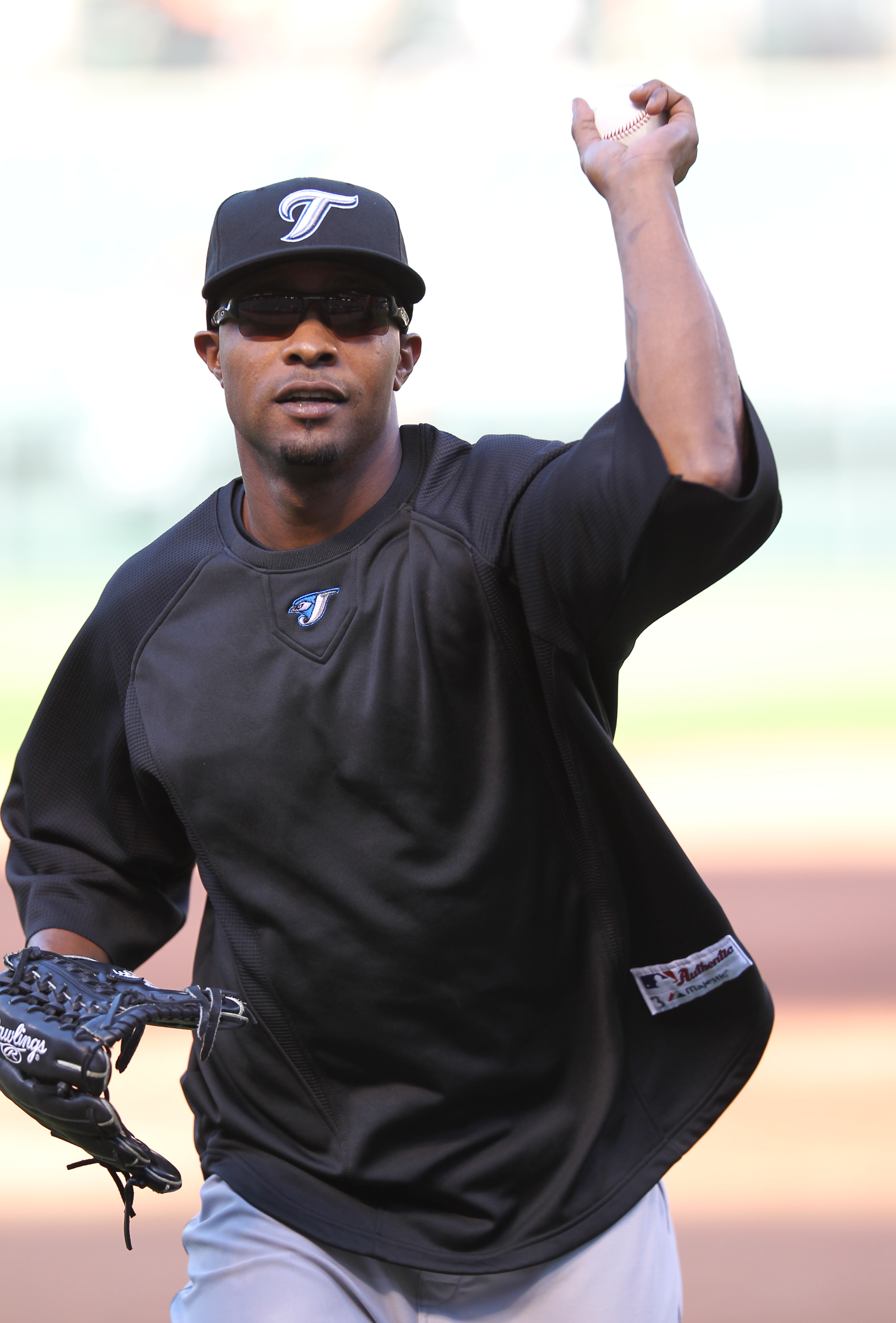
Wise during his tenure with the Toronto Blue Jays in 2011

=== Toronto Blue Jays (2010) ===
On October 9, Wise opted for free agency rather than accepting an outright assignment to Triple-A Charlotte. He signed with the Philadelphia Phillies on November 25, 2009, and prior to the 2010 season was assigned to the Triple-A Lehigh Valley IronPigs.

In June 2010, Wise exercised the June 1 opt-out date in his contract to become a free agent. On June 5, the Toronto Blue Jays signed him to a minor league deal.

=== Florida Marlins, Toronto Blue Jays (2011) ===
On January 12, 2011, the Florida Marlins signed Wise with an invitation to spring training.

On March 30, Wise exercised his out clause after failing to make the Marlins' Opening Day roster. The Marlins released him, making him a free agent. On April 11, after the Blue Jays center fielder Rajai Davis was placed on the 15-day disabled list, Wise was signed by the Blue Jays to a minor league contract. However, he was released on June 9.

He signed a minor league contract with the Florida Marlins on June 15. He was called up on June 17. On August 26, the Blue Jays claimed Wise off waivers. Wise made his 2011 Blue Jays debut on August 27, playing center field against the Tampa Bay Rays. On October 6, he elected free agency.

=== New York Yankees (2012) ===
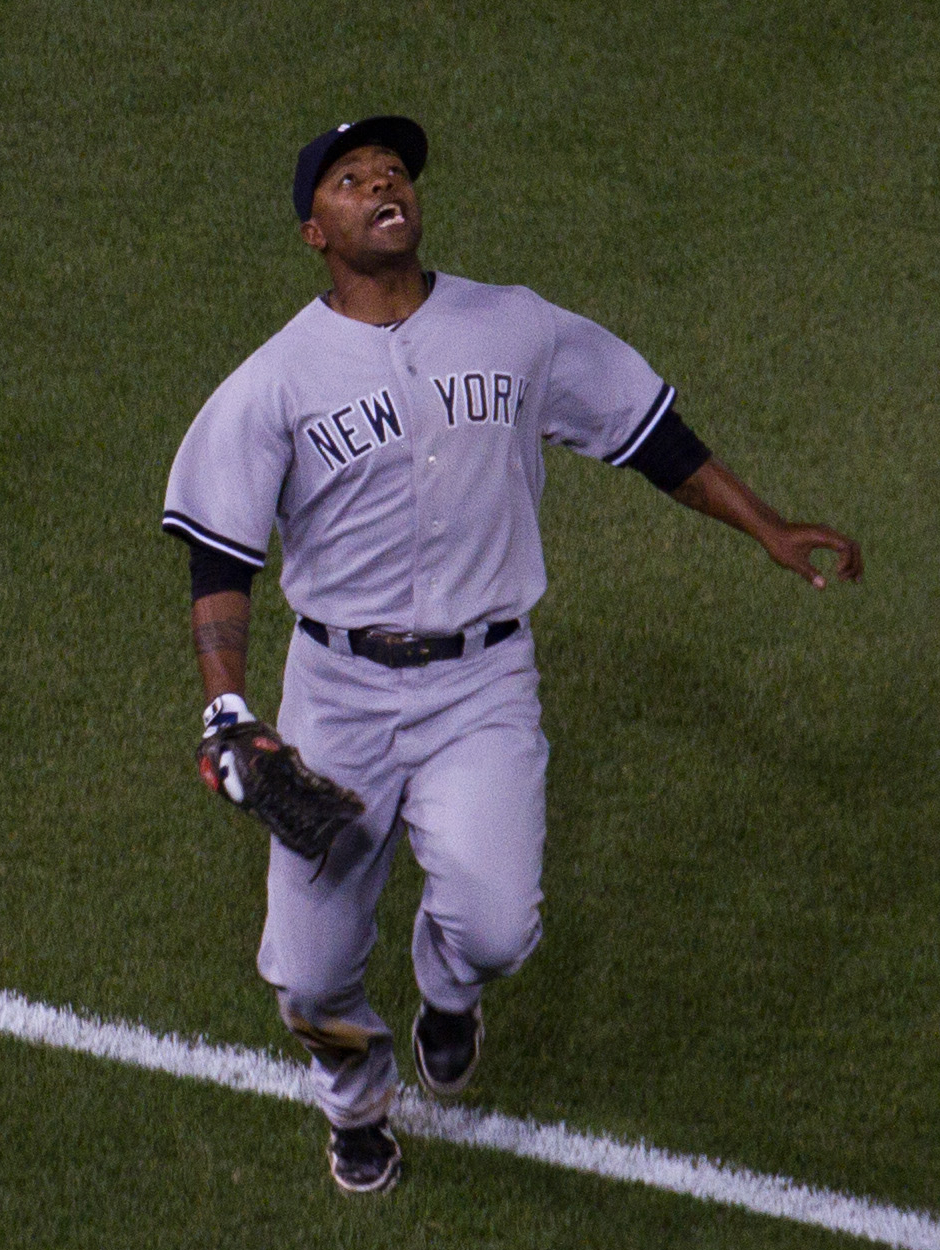
Wise playing for the New York Yankees in 2012

On January 4, 2012, Wise signed a minor league contract with the New York Yankees, receiving an invitation to spring training. After batting .333 (25-for-75) with four home runs for the Triple-A Scranton/Wilkes-Barre Yankees, Wise was called up on May 4, 2012, along with pitcher Cody Eppley to take the roster spots of D. J. Mitchell and Mariano Rivera, after the latter sustained an ACL tear.

Wise had a career game against the Cleveland Indians on June 25, as he hit a two-run home run in the second inning followed by a triple and RBI during the sixth inning, helping lead the Yankees to a 7–1 victory. On June 29 against the White Sox, Wise made his debut as a pitcher on the mound to get the last two outs in the top of the ninth inning. He was the first position player with the Yankees to pitch on the mound since Nick Swisher did in 2009.

On July 23, 2012, Wise was designated for assignment after the Yankees acquired Ichiro Suzuki. He refused an outright assignment to the minors and was released on July 30.

=== Chicago White Sox (2012–2013) ===
On August 3, 2012, Wise signed a minor league contract with the White Sox. On August 11, Wise was called up to replace Paul Konerko, who was placed on the 7-day disabled list.

On November 21, 2012, Wise signed a one-year, $700,000 deal to remain a member of the White Sox organization. He was released on August 3, 2013.
