= William Burroughs (disambiguation) =

William S. Burroughs (1914–1997) was an American writer and visual artist and beat generation personality.

William Burroughs may also refer to:

- William Seward Burroughs I (1857–1898), American inventor, grandfather of the writer
- William S. Burroughs Jr. (1947–1981), American novelist, son of the writer
- Sir William Burroughs, 1st Baronet (c. 1753–1829), Attorney General of Bengal and MP for Enniskillen, Colchester and Taunton

== See also ==
- William Burrows (disambiguation)
- William Burrough (disambiguation)
