= James Burrough =

James Burrough may refer to:

- Sir James Burrough (architect) (1691–1764), English amateur architect
- Sir James Burrough (judge) (1749–1837), British judge
