= Henry Burroughs =

American baseball player (1845–1878)

- Outfielder
- Born: February 3, 1845; Newark, New Jersey, U.S.
- Died: March 31, 1878 (aged 33); Newark, New Jersey, U.S.
- Batted: Unknown Threw: Unknown

MLB debut
- May 5, 1871, for the Washington Olympics

Last MLB appearance
- May 7, 1872, for the Washington Olympics

MLB statistics
- Batting average: .229
- Home runs: 1
- Runs batted in: 14
- Stats at Baseball Reference

Teams
- National Association of Base Ball Players Washington Olympics (1870) National Association of Professional BBP Washington Olympics (1871–1872)

Henry S. Burroughs (February 3, 1845 – March 31, 1878) was an American professional baseball player, for the Washington Olympics in 1871 and 1872. He died at age 33 in Newark New Jersey of undisclosed causes.
