= Silas Mainville Burroughs =

Silas Mainville Burroughs may refer to:

- Silas Mainville Burroughs (politician) (1810–1860), U.S. Representative from New York
- Silas Mainville Burroughs (pharmacist) (1846–1895), businessman and philanthropist
