= Sherman Everett Burroughs =

American politician (1870–1923)

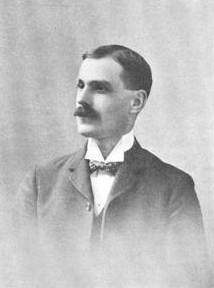

Member of the U.S. House of Representatives from New Hampshire's 1st district
- In office May 29, 1917 – January 27, 1923
- Preceded by: Cyrus A. Sulloway
- Succeeded by: William Nathaniel Rogers

Member of the New Hampshire House of Representatives For Bow, New Hampshire
- In office 1901–1902

Personal details
- Born: February 6, 1870 Dunbarton, New Hampshire
- Died: January 27, 1923 (aged 52) Washington, D.C.
- Resting place: Pine Grove Cemetery, Manchester, New Hampshire
- Party: Republican
- Spouse: Helen Sophie Phillips Burroughs
- Children: Sherman Everett Burroughs, Jr. John Hamilton Burroughs; Robert Phillips Burroughs; Henry Baker Burroughs
- Education: Dartmouth College; George Washington University
- Occupation: Lawyer; Politician

Sherman Everett Burroughs (February 6, 1870 – January 27, 1923) was an American politician and a U.S. representative from New Hampshire.

== Early life ==
Burroughs was born on February 6, 1870 in Dunbarton, New Hampshire. He attended the public schools, and was graduated from Dartmouth College, Hanover, in 1894.

== Career ==
Burroughs was private secretary to Congressman Henry M. Baker from 1894 to 1897. He was graduated from the law school of Columbian College (now George Washington University), Washington, D.C., in 1896. He was admitted to the Washington, D.C. bar in 1896 and the New Hampshire bar in 1897. Burroughs commenced practice in Manchester, New Hampshire, in 1897.

A member of the New Hampshire House of Representatives representing Bow, New Hampshire Burroughs served in 1901 and 1902. He was a member of the State board of charities and corrections, 1901–1907, and a member of the State board of equalization in 1909 and 1910.

Elected as a Republican to the Sixty-fifth Congress in a special election, to fill the vacancy caused by the death of United States Representative Cyrus A. Sulloway, Burroughs was reelected to the two succeeding Congresses and served from (May 29, 1917 – January 27, 1923). He didn't run for reelection to the Sixty-eighth Congress in 1922, and died in office.

== Death ==
Burroughs died in Washington, D.C., on January 27, 1923, ten days before his 53rd birthday and reportedly of congestion of the lungs caused by "an illness with the grippe and is interred at Pine Grove Cemetery in Manchester, New Hampshire.

== Family life ==
Son of John H. Burroughs and Helen M. Baker, Burroughs married Helen Sophie Phillips in 1898 and they had four sons, Sherman Everett Jr., John Hamilton, Robert Phillips Burroughs, and Henry Baker.

== See also ==
- List of members of the United States Congress who died in office (1900–1949)

U.S. House of Representatives
Preceded by Cyrus A. Sulloway	U.S. Representative for the 1st district of New Hampshire; May 29, 1917 – January 27, 1923	Succeeded by William Nathaniel Rogers
