= Sean Burroughs =

American baseball player (1980–2024)

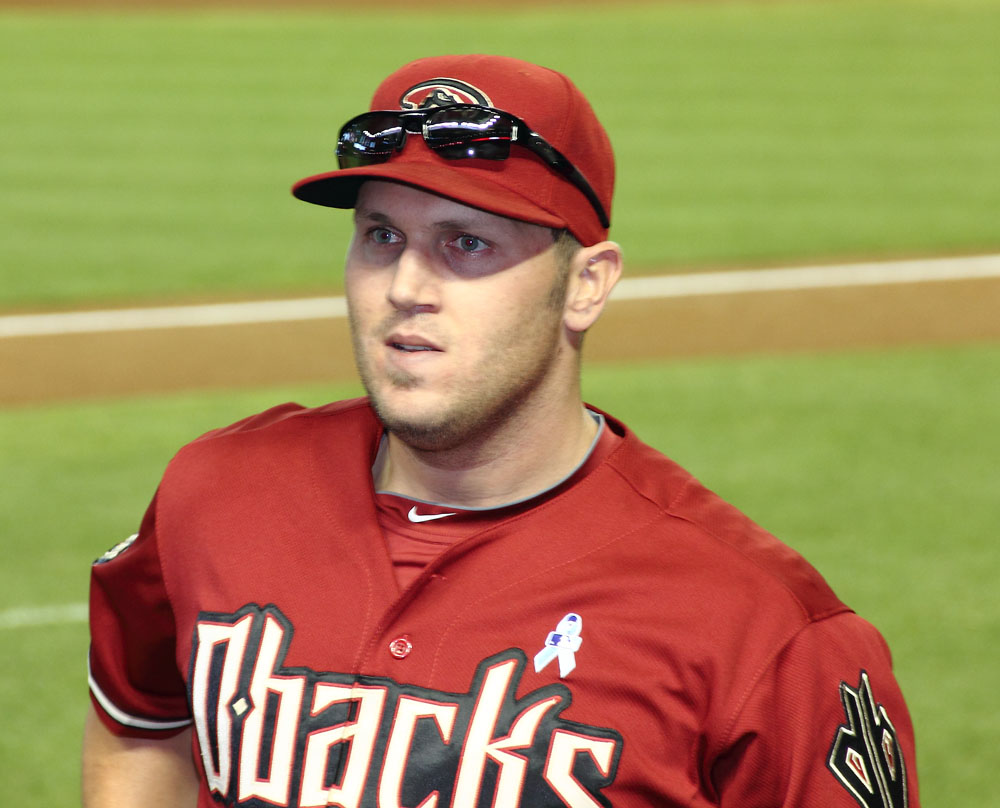
- Burroughs with the Arizona Diamondbacks in 2011
- Third baseman
- Born: September 12, 1980; Atlanta, Georgia, U.S.
- Died: May 9, 2024 (aged 43); Long Beach, California, U.S.
- Batted: Left Threw: Right

MLB debut
- April 2, 2002, for the San Diego Padres

Last MLB appearance
- April 30, 2012, for the Minnesota Twins

MLB statistics
- Batting average: .278
- Home runs: 12
- Runs batted in: 143
- Stats at Baseball Reference

Teams
- San Diego Padres (2002–2005); Tampa Bay Devil Rays (2006); Arizona Diamondbacks (2011); Minnesota Twins (2012)
Medals
Men's baseball
Representing United States
Olympic Games
Gold medal – first place	2000 Sydney	Team

Sean Patrick Burroughs (September 12, 1980 – May 9, 2024) was an American professional baseball third baseman, who played in Major League Baseball (MLB) from 2002 to 2005 and 2011 to 2012 for the San Diego Padres, Tampa Bay Devil Rays, Arizona Diamondbacks, and Minnesota Twins. He won a gold medal at the 2000 Summer Olympics.

== Early life and amateur career ==
Burroughs, the son of outfielder Jeff Burroughs, was born in Atlanta, Georgia, on September 12, 1980, when Jeff was a member of the Atlanta Braves of Major League Baseball (MLB). He starred in the Little League World Series as a pitcher when he was growing up in Long Beach, California. His team won the 1992 Little League World Series after their opponent in the championship round was disqualified for using over-aged players. He pitched consecutive no-hitters during the 1993 Little League World Series, which his team won.

Burroughs worked as an extra in Hollywood projects including Knots Landing, Saved by the Bell, and Terminator 2: Judgment Day. He attended Woodrow Wilson Classical High School in Long Beach and committed to attend the University of Southern California (USC) to play college baseball for the USC Trojans.

== Career ==
=== San Diego Padres ===
The San Diego Padres selected Burroughs in the first round, with the ninth overall selection, of the 1998 MLB draft. He signed with the Padres rather than attend USC.

Burroughs played in Minor League Baseball for the Fort Wayne Wizards and Rancho Cucamonga Quakes in 1999, the Mobile BayBears in 2000, and the Portland Beavers in 2001. In 2000, Burroughs appeared in the All-Star Futures Game, and was named the game's most valuable player. He also played baseball at the 2000 Summer Olympics, winning the gold medal.

Burroughs made the Padres' Opening Day roster for the 2002 season. He split the season between the Padres and Portland, batting .271 with one home run and 11 runs batted in in 63 games played for the Padres and .302 for the Beavers. Burroughs became the Padres' full-time third baseman in the 2003 season, batting .286 with seven home runs. He did not develop into the power hitter that the Padres thought he could become, and the Padres demoted Burroughs to the minor leagues during the 2005 season.

=== Tampa Bay Devil Rays ===
After the 2005 season, the Padres traded Burroughs to the Tampa Bay Devil Rays in exchange for Dewon Brazelton. He batted .190 in eight games for the Devil Rays before he was optioned to the Durham Bulls, Tampa Bay's Triple-A affiliate. The Rays released Burroughs on June 22.

=== Seattle Mariners ===
On December 24, 2006, Burroughs signed a minor league contract with the Seattle Mariners. He played four games for Seattle's Triple-A affiliate, the Tacoma Rainiers, before walking away from baseball because he had lost his passion for the game. He stopped playing baseball until 2010, partly due to a drug habit.

=== Arizona Diamondbacks ===
On November 22, 2010, Burroughs signed a minor league contract with the Arizona Diamondbacks. He had his contract purchased by Arizona on May 18, 2011, after four seasons out of the major leagues. He was placed on waivers on June 19, after hitting .261 for Arizona and outrighted to the minor leagues. After third baseman Melvin Mora was released, he was returned to Arizona's starting lineup on July 1, 2011. Burroughs played in 20 games for the Diamondbacks as they won the National League West division title. He batted 1-for-3 during the 2011 MLB postseason as a pinch hitter and became a free agent after the season.

=== Minnesota Twins ===
During the 2011–12 offseason, Burroughs played in the Venezuelan Winter League, batting .316. Gene Glynn, the manager of the Minnesota Twins' Triple-A affiliate, coached Burroughs there and recommended him to the Twins, who signed him to a minor league contract. He made the major league team in spring training. The Twins designated him for assignment on May 1. In October 2012, he elected minor league free agency.

=== Los Angeles Dodgers ===
On April 12, 2013, Burroughs signed a minor league contract with the Los Angeles Dodgers organization. He was assigned to the Chattanooga Lookouts, their Double-A affiliate, to begin the season. Burroughs played in 57 games for the Lookouts and hit .220.

=== Atlantic League ===
Burroughs signed with the Bridgeport Bluefish of the Atlantic League of Professional Baseball for 2014 season. He re-signed with the Bluefish for the 2015 season. On August 8, 2015, he was traded to the rival Long Island Ducks for outfielder Bryan Sabatella. On August 1, 2016, the Bluefish reacquired Burroughs from the Ducks in exchange for pitcher D. J. Mitchell.

== Death ==
Burroughs collapsed and died of a fentanyl overdose at age 43 in a parking lot on May 9, 2024, after dropping off his son for a Little League game in Long Beach.
