= John Burrows =

John Burrows may refer to:

- John Burrows (baseball) (1913–1987, American baseball player
- John Burrows (law professor), New Zealand Queen's Counsel who chaired the Flag Consideration Panel in 2015–16
- Sir John Cordy Burrows (1813–1876), British surgeon and local politician
- John P. Burrows (born 1954), professor of the physics of the ocean and atmosphere
- John Burrows (politician) (1864–1925), journalist and member of the Queensland Legislative Assembly
- John Selby (cricketer) (1849–1894), born John Burrows, English cricket player

== See also ==
- John Burroughs (1837–1921), American naturalist and nature essayist
- John Burroughs (disambiguation)
- Jon Burrows, Northern Ireland politician
