= John Burrough (Gloucestershire cricketer) =

English cricketer

John Wilson Burrough (17 June 1904 – 11 September 1969) was an English first-class cricketer who played in 10 matches for Oxford University and Gloucestershire between 1924 and 1937. He was born in Summertown, Oxford and died at Seale, Surrey.
