= Burrow (surname) =

Burrow is a surname. Notable people with the surname include:

- Andrew Burrow (born 1963), South African tennis player
- Bob Burrow (1934–2019), American basketball player
- Curtis Burrow, American football player
- Edward Burrow (priest) (1785–1861), English divine
- James Burrow (1701–1782), English legal reporter
- Jim Burrow (born 1953), American football player and coach
- Joe Burrow (born 1996), son of Jim; American football quarterback
- Jordan Burrow (born 1992), English footballer
- J. W. Burrow (1935–2009), English historian
- Kathleen Mary Burrow (1899–1987), Australian physiotherapist, businesswoman and Catholic lay leader
- Ken Burrow (born 1948), American football player
- Milton Burrow (1920–2017), American sound editor
- Reuben Burrow (1747–1792), English mathematician, surveyor and Orientalist
- Rob Burrow (1982–2024), English rugby league player
- Rube Burrow (1855–1890), American outlaw
- Sharan Burrow (born 1954), Australian trade unionist
- Stephen Burrow (born 1958), English cricketer
- Taj Burrow (born 1978), Australian surfer
- Thomas Burrow (1909–1986), English Indologist and professor of Sanskrit at Oxford
- Trigant Burrow (1875–1950), American psychoanalyst, psychiatrist and psychologist

== See also ==
- Burrough, surname
- Burrows (surname)
