= Robert P. Burroughs =

American businessman (1900–1994)

Robert Phillips Burroughs (January 13, 1900 – June 10, 1994), son of Sherman Everett Burroughs, graduated from Manchester High School in 1917. He attended Dartmouth College and earned a master's degree in business administration in 1922. Burroughs was a businessman in Manchester, New Hampshire. He specialized in designing pension plans for corporations. He was also active in Republican politics. He served as committeeman from New Hampshire for the Republican National Committee during the 1940s and actively supported Dwight D. Eisenhower during the 1952 and 1956 presidential campaigns. In late 1953 he sponsored a nationwide poll to determine voter satisfaction with the policies of the Eisenhower administration. Burroughs was appointed to represent the U.S. at independence ceremonies in the Cameroons in 1959 and at the inauguration of the president of Liberia in 1960. He also served on the board of directors of the Panama Canal Company during the Eisenhower administration.
