= William Burrough =

William Burrough may refer to:

- William S. Burroughs, American novelist and literary figure
- William Burrough (cricketer), English cricketer

== See also ==
- William Borough, British naval officer
- William Burroughs (disambiguation)
