= David Phelps (baseball) =

American baseball player (born 1986)

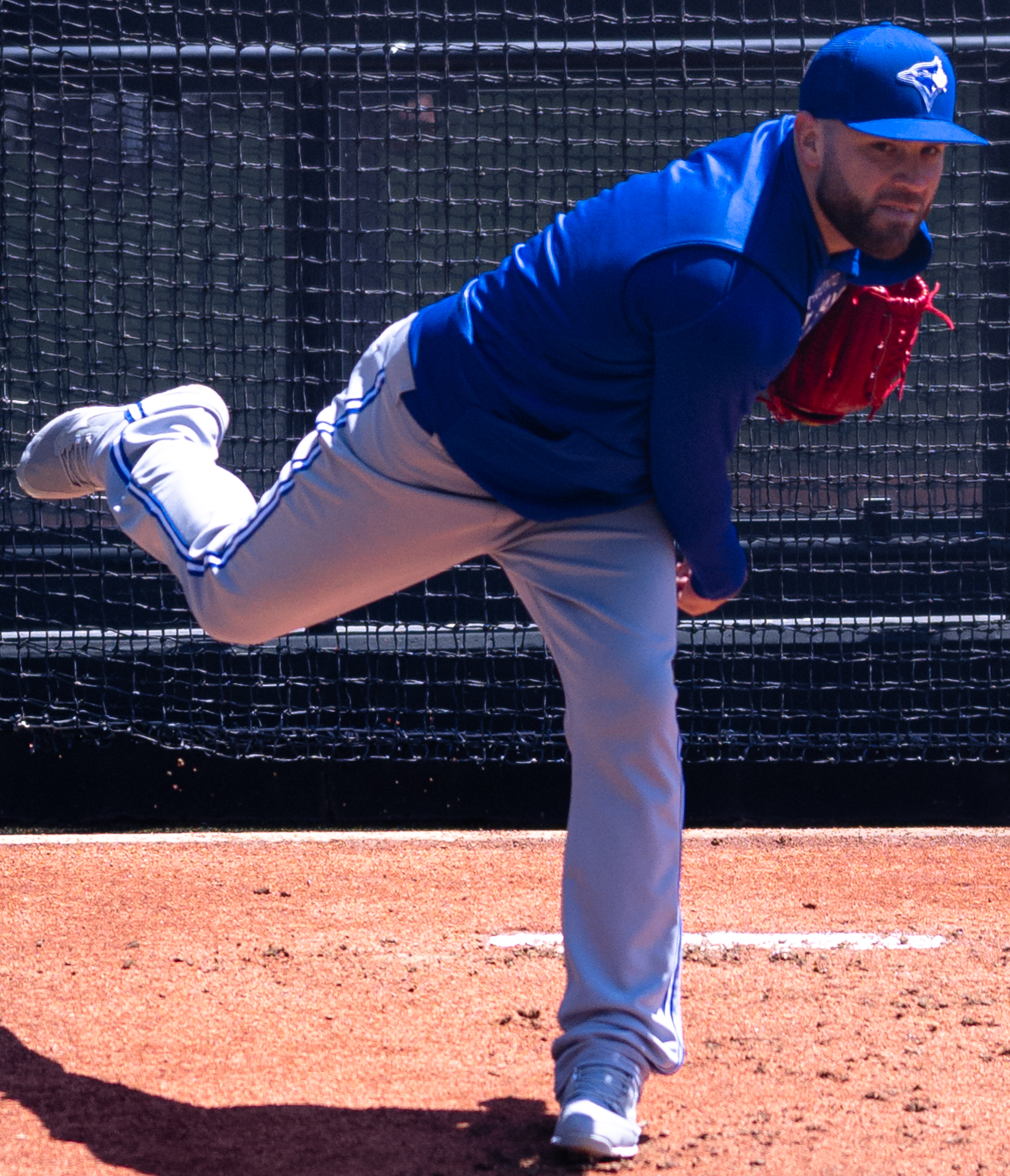
- Phelps with the Blue Jays in 2022
- Pitcher
- Born: October 9, 1986 (age 40); St. Louis, Missouri, U.S.
- Batted: Right Threw: Right

MLB debut
- April 8, 2012, for the New York Yankees

Last MLB appearance
- October 5, 2022, for the Toronto Blue Jays

MLB statistics
- Win–loss record: 34–40
- Earned run average: 3.80
- Strikeouts: 666
- Stats at Baseball Reference

Teams
- New York Yankees (2012–2014); Miami Marlins (2015–2017); Seattle Mariners (2017); Toronto Blue Jays (2019); Chicago Cubs (2019); Milwaukee Brewers (2020); Philadelphia Phillies (2020); Toronto Blue Jays (2021–2022)

David Edward Phelps (born October 9, 1986) is an American former professional baseball pitcher. He played in Major League Baseball (MLB) for the New York Yankees, Miami Marlins, Seattle Mariners, Toronto Blue Jays, Chicago Cubs, Milwaukee Brewers, and Philadelphia Phillies. Phelps played college baseball at the University of Notre Dame.

== Amateur career ==
Phelps attended Hazelwood West High School in Hazelwood, Missouri, where he played basketball and baseball. For the baseball team, he was named to the All-Conference Team as both an outfielder and pitcher as a sophomore, and as team captain and to the All-Conference, All-Metro Performer, and team captain as a junior and senior. He was a member of the National Honor Society.

Though Phelps was ranked as the sixth best prospect from Missouri prior to the 2005 Major League Baseball draft, Phelps was not selected due to his strong commitment to enroll at the University of Notre Dame, where he pitched for the Notre Dame Fighting Irish baseball team. As a freshman, Phelps pitched sparsely as a reliever. As a sophomore, he pitched in the starting rotation, earning Big East All-Conference First Team, Academic All-District and Academic All-American honors. He struggled in his junior season. While in college, he also pitched for the Mat-Su Miners of the Alaska Baseball League, and in 2007 for the Falmouth Commodores of the Cape Cod League.

== Professional career ==
=== New York Yankees ===
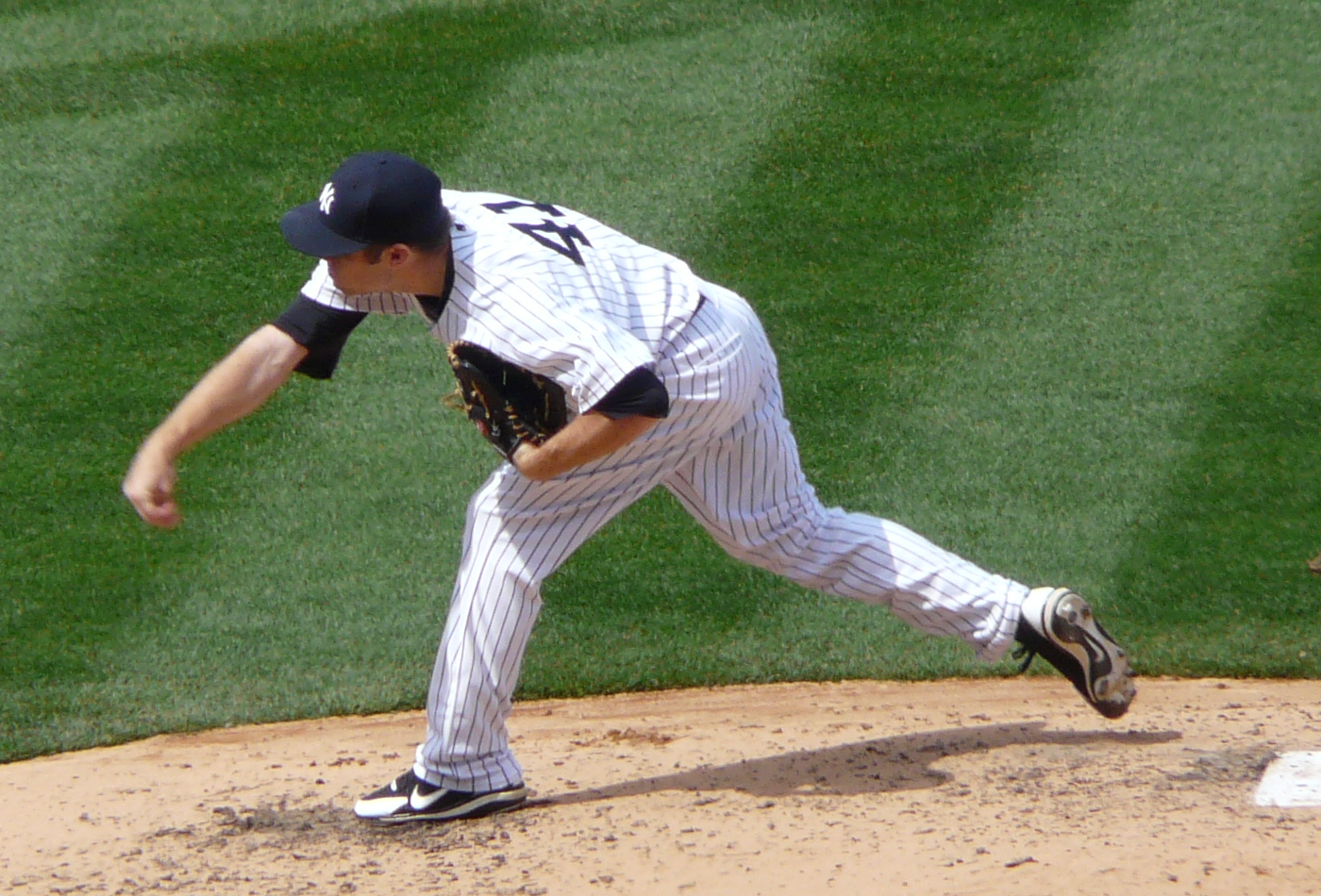
Phelps' pitching motion

Damon Oppenheimer, the scouting director for the New York Yankees, noticed Phelps while on a visit to Notre Dame to scout Kyle Weiland, Phelps' teammate. Based on Oppenheimer's recommendation, the Yankees selected Phelps in the 14th round of the 2008 Major League Baseball draft. Phelps was named to the 2010 Eastern League All-Star Game. In 2011, he played for the Scranton/Wilkes-Barre Yankees, the Triple-A affiliate of the New York Yankees. Phelps was named the Yankees minor league pitcher of the year for 2010. He was added to the Yankees 40-man roster after the 2011 season to protect him from the Rule 5 draft.

Phelps made the Yankees' Opening Day roster in 2012. On April 29, 2012, he was moved into the starting rotation to replace the struggling Freddy García. Phelps started 0–0 with a 3.57 ERA in six games before the switch. After making two starts for the Yankees, the team shifted him back to the bullpen when they promoted Andy Pettitte. On June 14, 2012, Phelps was sent down to Triple-A after David Robertson came off from the disabled list (DL). Phelps returned to the team as a starter when Pettitte and CC Sabathia were placed on the DL with injuries.

During a game against the New York Mets on May 29, 2013, Phelps surrendered 5 runs (4 earned) in the first inning and only lasted 1/3 of an inning. (It was the shortest outing for any Yankees starting pitcher at the new Yankee Stadium.) On July 6, 2013, he was placed on the 15-day disabled list, due to a right forearm strain. On August 15, 2013, Phelps was transferred to the 60-day disabled list. On September 14, 2013 he was reinstated from the 60-day disabled list.

In 2014, Phelps had a 5-5 record with a 4.38 ERA in 113 innings with 92 strikeouts and 42 walks in 32 games, 17 starts.

=== Miami Marlins ===
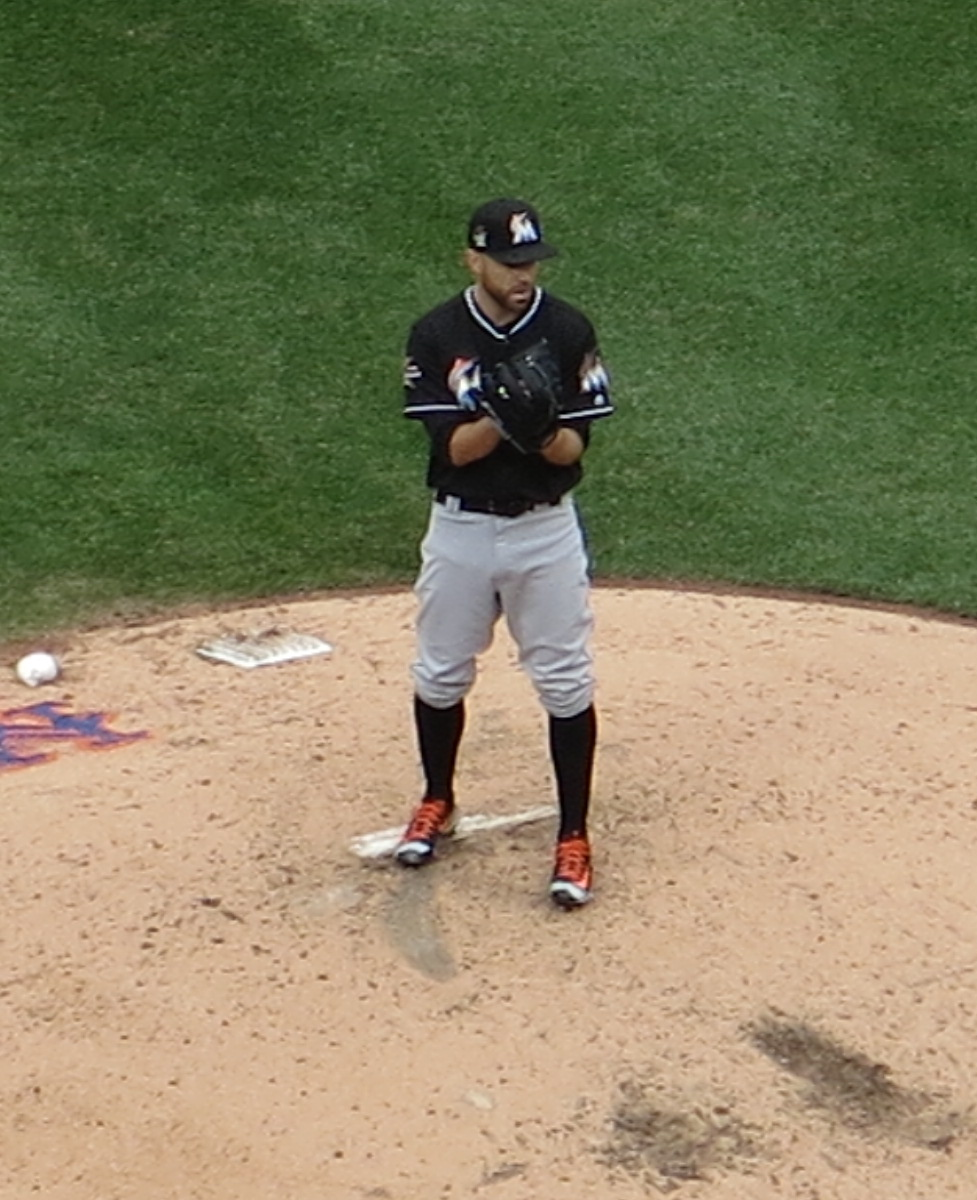
Phelps with the Marlins

On December 19, 2014, the Yankees traded Phelps and Martín Prado to the Miami Marlins for Nathan Eovaldi, Garrett Jones, and Domingo Germán.

At the start of the 2016 season, Phelps was installed as the Marlins primary setup reliever, usually called in to pitch the eighth inning. Through 25 games, he maintained an ERA of 1.93

=== Seattle Mariners ===
On July 20, 2017, the Marlins traded Phelps to the Seattle Mariners for prospects Brayan Hernandez, Brandon Miller, Pablo Lopez, and Lukas Schiraldi. On March 21, 2018, Phelps suffered a torn ulnar collateral ligament in his right elbow during spring training, and was out for the entire season, awaiting reconstructive elbow surgery.

=== Toronto Blue Jays ===
Phelps signed with the Toronto Blue Jays, on January 12, 2019. While appearing in 17 game appearances, he posted a 3.63 ERA, with no game decisions.

=== Chicago Cubs ===
The Blue Jays traded Phelps to the Chicago Cubs on July 30, 2019, in exchange for minor league player Thomas Hatch. Phelps posted a 2-1 record with a 3.18 ERA, in 24 relief appearances.

=== Milwaukee Brewers ===
On January 29, 2020, Phelps signed a one-year deal with the Milwaukee Brewers. In 12 relief appearances, he posted a 2-3 record with a 2.77 ERA.

=== Philadelphia Phillies ===
On August 31, 2020, the Brewers traded Phelps to the Philadelphia Phillies in exchange for Juan Geraldo, Brandon Ramey, and Israel Puello. He struggled to a 12.91 ERA in 10 games for Philadelphia.

=== Second stint with the Blue Jays ===
On February 11, 2021, Phelps officially signed a one-year, $1.75 million contract with the Toronto Blue Jays. On May 15, Phelps was placed on the 60-day injured list with a right lat strain. On May 25, it was announced that Phelps would miss the remainder of the season after undergoing surgery to repair a “significant” strain in his right lat. In 11 appearances for Toronto in 2021, Phelps recorded a minuscule 0.87 ERA with 15 strikeouts. On November 29, Phelps signed a minor league contract with the Blue Jays and was invited to spring training. On April 1, 2022, Phelps had his contract selected to the major league roster.

On January 18, 2023, he announced his retirement from Major League Baseball.

== Pitching style ==
Phelps threw four pitches, a four-seam fastball (90–92), two-seam fastball (89–92), cutter (86–88) and a changeup (82–85). The two-seamer was his primary pitch to left-handed hitters, and his four-seamer was his primary pitch to right-handers. He utilized his changeup exclusively against lefties. He liked to use his cutter in 2-strike counts against righties.

== Personal life ==
Phelps is a devout Catholic and frequently attended Mass at St. Patrick's Cathedral in Midtown Manhattan when he was a member of the Yankees.

Phelps met his wife, Maria, at Notre Dame when they worked together on an assignment. They had their first child, a daughter in 2012, a second daughter in 2013, and his third daughter in 2015, then a son.
