= Clay Rapada =

American baseball player (born 1981)

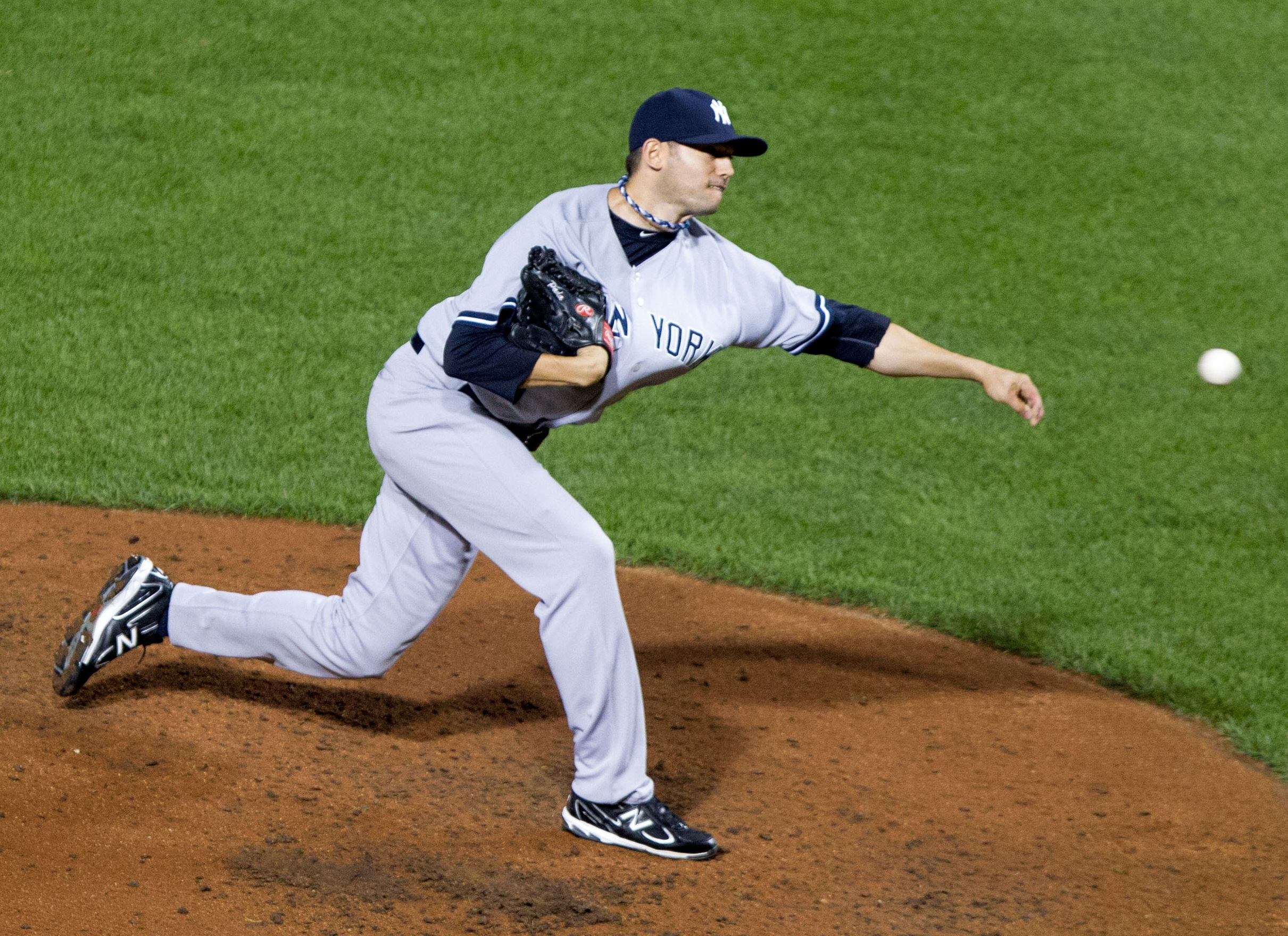
- Rapada in 2012 with the Yankees
- Relief pitcher
- Born: March 9, 1981 (age 45); Chesapeake, Virginia, U.S.
- Batted: Right Threw: Left

MLB debut
- June 14, 2007, for the Chicago Cubs

Last MLB appearance
- September 22, 2013, for the Cleveland Indians

MLB statistics
- Win–loss record: 8–0
- Earned run average: 4.09
- Strikeouts: 82
- Stats at Baseball Reference

Teams
- Chicago Cubs (2007); Detroit Tigers (2007–2009); Texas Rangers (2010); Baltimore Orioles (2011); New York Yankees (2012); Cleveland Indians (2013)

Clayton Anthony Rapada (born March 9, 1981) is an American former professional baseball relief pitcher and coach. He played in Major League Baseball (MLB) for the Chicago Cubs, Detroit Tigers, Texas Rangers, Baltimore Orioles, New York Yankees, and Cleveland Indians.

He has appeared in 152 major league games (none of which he started), but has pitched only 93 innings in that time, averaging about 2/3 of an inning per appearance. He does, however, hold a unique major league record; he has a career win-loss record of 8–0 for a winning percentage of 1.000. This marks the most wins for a pitcher without ever being charged with a loss.

Rapada coached in the San Francisco Giants minor league system from 2016 to 2021.

== Early life ==
Rapada was born in Chesapeake, Virginia to an American mother and a Filipino father, whose roots traces to Cabangan, Zambales. He graduated from Deep Creek High School of Chesapeake, Virginia in 1999 and was a fan of the Chicago Cubs. He then attended Virginia State University and played on the NCAA Division II Trojans baseball team. As a freshman, Rapada went 7–1 and was planning on transferring to Old Dominion before he was approached by a Chicago Cubs scout.

== Playing career ==
=== Chicago Cubs ===
Rapada signed with the Chicago Cubs as an undrafted free agent in 2002. Rapada made his professional debut with the Single-A Boise Hawks in 2002 and spent part of the 2003 season with the team as well. He was promoted to the Single-A Lansing Lugnuts, where he posted a 4.96 earned run average (ERA) and recorded 27 strikeouts over 45 1/3 innings pitched, primarily in relief.

In 2004, Cubs coaches suggested that Rapada try a sidearm delivery. Rapada showed improvement that season for the Lugnuts, going 6–6 with an ERA of 2.33 in 57 appearances. He was a Midwest League Post-Season All-Star.

In 2005, the Cubs moved Rapada up to the High-A Daytona Cubs, where he went 1–3 with an ERA 3.83 in 27 appearances. In 2006, he pitched for both the Double-A West Tenn Diamond Jaxx and the Triple-A Iowa Cubs. Between the two teams, he appeared in 61 games and posted an ERA of 1.59. He was selected as a Southern League All-Star while with the Diamond Jaxx.

Rapada made his major league debut with the Chicago Cubs on June 14, 2007, against the Seattle Mariners. He faced one batter, Raúl Ibañez, who lined out to Cubs right fielder Cliff Floyd. Rapada was sent back to Iowa without making another appearance.

=== Detroit Tigers ===
On August 30, 2007, Rapada was announced as the player to be named later in the trade between the Tigers and Cubs involving outfielder Craig Monroe. He was assigned to Triple-A Toledo.

Rapada made his Tigers debut on September 9. In a coincidence, he faced Ibáñez again, giving up a three-run home run. He was pulled immediately after, without getting an out, giving him the distinction of facing the same batter (and only that batter) twice in his first two major league appearances. He pitched in four games for the Tigers.

Rapada earned his first major league victory on April 15, 2008, as the Tigers beat the Minnesota Twins 6–5. He did not make the Tigers 25-man roster and began the 2009 season playing for the Toledo Mud Hens.

=== Texas Rangers ===
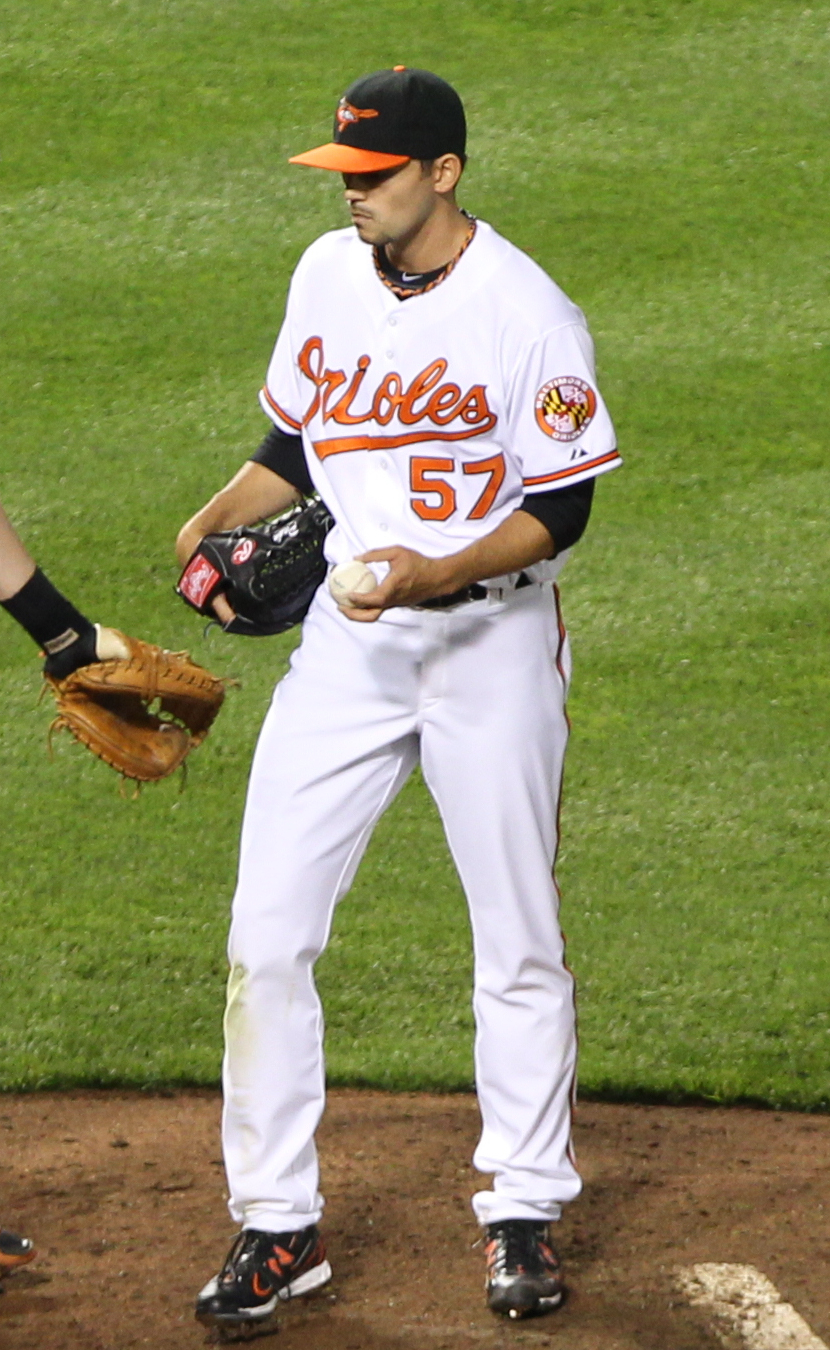
Rapada with the Orioles in 2011

On December 7, 2009, Rapada was traded to the Texas Rangers for a player to be named later or cash considerations. On December 16, Rapada was outrighted off the 40-man roster to Triple-A.

Rapada played most of the 2010 season with the Triple-A Oklahoma City RedHawks. On September 3, Texas called up Rapada to the major league roster.

Rapada was listed as an alternative during the postseason when the Rangers would make it to the World Series for the first time in franchise history. The Rangers would eventually lose the World Series to the San Francisco Giants.

On January 14, 2011, Rapada was placed on release waivers by the Rangers.

=== Baltimore Orioles ===
On January 25, 2011, Rapada was signed by the Baltimore Orioles and invited to spring training to compete for a roster spot. After being sent to the minors after spring training, Rapada was called up by Baltimore on April 17. He made his Orioles debut on April 18 with two outs in the seventh inning against the Minnesota Twins. He was designated for assignment on June 29. In 16 1/3 innings with Baltimore, Rapada had a 6.06 ERA.

After being designated for assignment on February 6, Rapada was released by the Orioles on February 15. He led the major leagues in left-handers' batting average who face him since 2010.

=== New York Yankees ===
Rapada signed a minor league contract with the New York Yankees on February 18, 2012, with an invitation to spring training. Rapada made the Yankees Opening Day roster. He had a 2.82 ERA in 70 appearances. After 2013 spring training, he was designated for assignment. He cleared waivers and was released on April 3. He was re-signed to a minor league deal on April 9 and released on June 3.

=== Cleveland Indians ===
Rapada signed a minor league contract with the Cleveland Indians on June 13, 2013. After spending most of the season with the Triple-A Columbus Clippers, he was added to the Indians' major league roster as a September call-up. He was designated for assignment on October 2. After an outright assignment on October 7, Rapada elected free agency on October 16.

=== Los Angeles Angels of Anaheim ===
Rapada signed a minor league deal with the Los Angeles Angels of Anaheim in December 2013. He was released before the end of spring training.

=== Seattle Mariners ===
Rapada signed a minor league deal with the Seattle Mariners in April 2014 and was assigned to the Triple-A Tacoma Rainiers. He pitched in 14 games, going 4–1 with a 4.12 ERA before his release on June 16.

=== Baltimore Orioles (second stint) ===
On June 16, 2014, Rapada signed a minor league contract with the Baltimore Orioles. He reported to the Triple-A Norfolk Tides. Rapada was released by the Orioles organization on August 5.

=== San Francisco Giants ===
On February 5, 2015, Rapada signed a minor league deal with the San Francisco Giants.

== Philippine national team ==
Due to his Filipino heritage, Rapada is eligible to play for the Philippine national team. He was to participate for the Philippines at the 2013 World Baseball Classic (WBC) qualifiers in 2012 but did not participate citing personal reasons. Rapada pitched for the Philippines at the 2017 WBC qualifiers in February 2016.

== Coaching career ==
After the 2015 season, Rapada was hired as a pitching coach for the San Francisco Giants Low-A affiliate Augusta GreenJackets. He served in that role until 2021, when the Giants moved him to a role as the assistant pitching coordinator.
