= John H. Burroughs =

American naval engineer and shipwright

John Henry Burroughs

John Henry Burroughs (October 1827 – 16 February 1891) was a naval engineer and shipwright who played an important role in the construction of the Confederate ironclad warships CSS Virginia (Merrimack) and CSS Richmond, and who later served as Superintendent of the Gosport Naval Shipyard in Portsmouth, Virginia, while it was under occupation by Union forces during the American Civil War.

== Early life and family ==
Burroughs's parents were from Stafford County, but at an early day moved to Mathews County, Virginia, where Burroughs was born. His wife was from the "Eastern Shore of Virginia." He and his wife had 12 children.

== Gosport Yard ==
Burroughs spent most of his career at the Gosport Yard (known as Norfolk Naval Shipyard after 1862). His skills required him to play an important role in ironclad warship construction at the yard in 1861 and 1862. Yet, as a staunch and open Union sympathizer, he was said to have spent the early part of the American Civil War under constant guard by Confederate authorities.

Burroughs is suspected of being responsible for secret leaks of information regarding the technical details and progress of the rebuilding of USS Merrimack and its transformation into the Confederate ironclad warship CSS Virginia. At least some of this secret information may have been smuggled via a freed female slave named Mary Touvestre who traveled from Norfolk to the White House in Washington DC while obstensively visiting relatives in Northern Virginia. Burroughs is also suspected of being behind other leaks when he secretly traveled to Fort Monroe to meet with Union forces there.

Once Union forces overran the Yard in 1862, Burroughs was named Superintendent there.

== Relatives ==
Burroughs was the nephew of lighthouse builder Elzy Burroughs.

Burroughs's son, Samuel L. Burroughs, was postmaster of Portsmouth, Norfolk County, Virginia.
