= D. J. Mitchell (baseball) =

American baseball player (born 1987)

- Pitcher
- Born: May 13, 1987 (age 39); Winston-Salem, North Carolina, U.S.
- Batted: Right Threw: Right

MLB debut
- May 1, 2012, for the New York Yankees

Last MLB appearance
- July 15, 2012, for the New York Yankees

MLB statistics
- Win–loss record: 0–0
- Earned run average: 3.86
- Strikeouts: 2
- Stats at Baseball Reference

Teams
- New York Yankees (2012)

William Douglas "D. J." Mitchell Jr. (born May 13, 1987) is an American former professional baseball pitcher. He played in Major League Baseball (MLB) for the New York Yankees in 2012. Before embarking on his professional career, he played college baseball at Clemson University.

== Amateur career ==
Mitchell graduated from North Forsyth High School in Winston-Salem, North Carolina, and attended Clemson University, where he played college baseball for the Clemson Tigers baseball team in the Atlantic Coast Conference. In 2006, Mitchell's freshman year, he played as a right fielder. Mitchell began to pitch in 2007, his sophomore year at Clemson. After Clemson's 2007 season concluded, Mitchell pitched for the Bourne Braves of the Cape Cod Baseball League (CCBL), a collegiate summer baseball league. He led the CCBL in strikeouts, earning him recognition in Sports Illustrated's Faces in the Crowd feature. By 2008, Mitchell played exclusively as a pitcher, and he was named First Team All-ACC.

== Professional career ==
=== New York Yankees ===
The New York Yankees drafted Mitchell in the 10th round, 320th overall, of the 2008 Major League Baseball draft. Making his professional debut in 2009, he had a 1.95 earned run average (ERA) in 6 games with the Charleston RiverDogs of the Single-A South Atlantic League. He had a 2.87 ERA in 19 games after his promotion to the Tampa Yankees of the High-A Florida State League. After the season, Baseball Prospectus ranked Mitchell as the organization's 11th best prospect.

Mitchell began the 2010 season with the Trenton Thunder of the Double-A Eastern League. On August 21, 2010, Mitchell was promoted from Trenton to the Triple-A Scranton/Wilkes-Barre Yankees of the International League. Before the 2011 season, Mitchell was rated the organization's 18th best prospect and 10th best pitching prospect. In 2011, he had a 13–9 win–loss record with a 3.18 ERA for Scranton/Wilkes-Barre. For this performance, Mitchell won the 2011 Yankees' Minor League "Pitcher of the Year" Award.

Mitchell was added to the Yankees' 40-man roster after the 2011 season to protect him from the Rule 5 draft. Competing for the long reliever role with the Yankees in spring training in 2012, the Yankees chose David Phelps for the role, and Mitchell was optioned to Scranton/Wilkes-Barre.

On April 29, 2012, Mitchell was recalled to the Yankees after Freddy García was moved to the bullpen. David Phelps was placed in the rotation, Cody Eppley was optioned to Scranton/Wilkes-Barre, and Mitchell took Phelps' role of long relief. He made his major league debut on May 1, against the Baltimore Orioles, allowing two hits and striking out one in an inning of work. He made three more appearances with the Yankees during his rookie campaign.

=== Seattle Mariners ===
The Yankees traded Mitchell and pitcher Danny Farquhar to the Seattle Mariners in exchange for Ichiro Suzuki on July 23, 2012. Mitchell was optioned to Triple-A Tacoma after the trade and pitched to a 2.96 ERA in eight starts. On April 11, 2013, Mitchell was designated for assignment. After clearing waivers, he opted for free agency.

=== New York Mets ===
Mitchell signed a minor league contract with the New York Mets on April 22, 2013. He pitched to a 7.71 ERA in 81 2/3 innings out of the bullpen and starting rotation for the Triple-A Las Vegas Aviators. Mitchell became a free agent after the season.

=== Bridgeport Bluefish ===
Mitchell signed with the Bridgeport Bluefish of the Atlantic League of Professional Baseball for the 2014 season. In 27 starts for Bridgeport, he compiled a 9-11 record and 4.63 ERA with 110 strikeouts across 155 2/3 innings pitched.

Mitchell re-signed with the Bluefish for the 2015 season. In 19 starts for the team, he accumulated a 6-8 record and 2.89 ERA with 86 strikeouts over 112 innings of work.

Mitchell returned for a third season with the club in 2016. In 12 appearances (nine starts) for Bridgeport, he logged a 2-3 record and 4.39 ERA with 48 strikeouts across 55 1/3 innings pitched.

=== Long Island Ducks ===
On August 1, 2016, Mitchell was traded to the Long Island Ducks in exchange for former major league player Sean Burroughs. He made two starts for Long Island, posting a 1-0 record and 7.88 ERA with five strikeouts over eight innings of work. Mitchell became a free agent after the season.
