= 2012 Detroit Tigers season =

Major League Baseball season

2012 Detroit Tigers
- American League champions American League Central champions
- League: American League
- Division: Central
- Ballpark: Comerica Park
- City: Detroit, Michigan
- Record: 88–74 (.543)
- Divisional place: 1st
- Owners: Mike Ilitch
- General managers: Dave Dombrowski
- Managers: Jim Leyland
- Television: Fox Sports Detroit (Mario Impemba, Rod Allen)
- Radio: Detroit Tigers Radio Network (Dan Dickerson, Jim Price)
- Stats: ESPN.com; Baseball Reference

The 2012 Detroit Tigers season was the team's 112th season. On October 1, the Tigers clinched the AL Central title, the club's first repeat title since 1934–1935. They finished the regular season 88–74. They defeated the Oakland Athletics in the American League Divisional Series, 3 games to 2. It was the Tigers' second consecutive ALDS win. The Tigers went on to sweep the New York Yankees in the American League Championship Series before being swept themselves by the San Francisco Giants in the World Series.

Slugger Miguel Cabrera became the first player in 45 years to win the Triple Crown and beat out Mike Trout to win the AL MVP.

== Roster moves ==
=== Releases ===
- On October 29, the Tigers released relief pitcher Joel Zumaya to free agency.
- On November 1, the Tigers released outfielder Magglio Ordóñez, infielder Carlos Guillén, and starting pitcher Brad Penny to free agency.
- On December 12, the Tigers released utility infielder Will Rhymes to free agency.
- On March 12, the Tigers released relief pitcher David Pauley. On March 15, Pauley cleared waivers and became a free agent.
- On April 26, the Tigers released veteran infielder Brandon Inge after 12 seasons.

=== Key injuries ===
- On December 16, the team announced that relief pitcher Al Alburquerque had surgery on his pitching elbow, to replace a stress fracture.
- On January 17, it was reported that designated hitter/catcher/infielder Víctor Martínez tore his ACL and needs surgery to repair it. On March 12, the team placed Martinez on the 60-day disabled list and declared him out for the season.

=== Signings and key returns ===
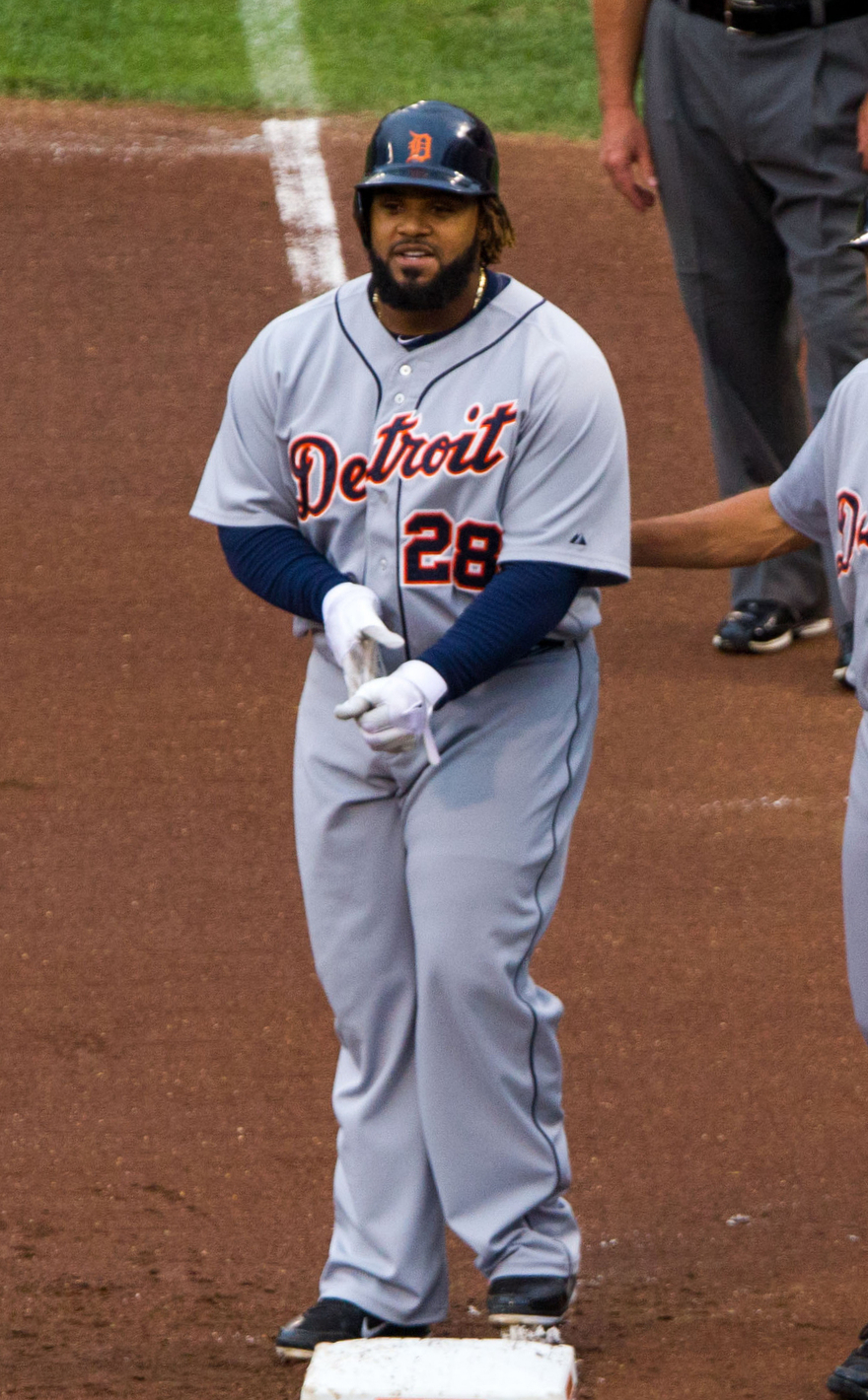
The Tigers signed free agent first baseman Prince Fielder on January 24.

- On October 28, the Tigers picked up the option on closer José Valverde.
- On November 18, the Tigers signed catcher Gerald Laird to a one-year contract. Laird had been the Tigers' primary catcher for the 2009 and 2010 seasons.
- Also on November 18, the club purchased the minor league contracts of pitching prospects Casey Crosby, Tyler Stohr and Matt Hoffman; outfielder Avisaíl García and infielder Hernan Perez.
- On November 30, the Tigers re-signed second baseman Ramón Santiago to a two-year deal.
- On December 9, the Tigers announced a one-year deal with relief pitcher Octavio Dotel. There is an option for the 2013 season.
- On January 16, the Tigers avoided arbitration with starting pitcher Rick Porcello and reliever Phil Coke, signing both to one-year deals. The following day, the team agreed on one-year deals for starting pitcher Max Scherzer, outfielder Delmon Young and utilityman Don Kelly. This helps the team avoid an arbitration hearing for the 10th year in a row.
- On January 24, the Tigers signed first baseman Prince Fielder to a nine-year, $214 million deal. As a result, Miguel Cabrera moved to third base.
- On April 20, the Tigers re-acquired pitcher Zach Miner from the Kansas City Royals in exchange for cash. Miner will report to the AA Erie SeaWolves.

=== Trades ===
- On December 9, the Tigers traded relief pitcher Ryan Perry to the Washington Nationals for fellow reliever Collin Balester.
- On July 23, the Tigers traded pitcher Jacob Turner and two minor league prospects (catcher Rob Brantly and pitcher Brian Flynn) to the Miami Marlins for starting pitcher Aníbal Sánchez and infielder Omar Infante.
- On August 6, the Tigers acquired utilityman Jeff Baker from the Chicago Cubs for two minor league players to be named later. He was traded to the Atlanta Braves on August 31 for a player to be named later.

== Delmon Young's arrest ==
On April 27, 2012, an intoxicated Delmon Young was arrested for third-degree assault and an "aggravated harassment hate crime" in New York City after a confrontation with a group of Jewish tourists in which he made antisemitic remarks outside of their hotel before a series against the Yankees. Later in the day, Young issued a statement apologizing for his actions. On April 30, Young was suspended without pay for seven games, and ordered to undergo therapy.

== Individual accomplishments ==
- On September 27, starting pitcher Doug Fister struck out 9 batters in a row, a new American League record. It was just one short of the Major League record of 10 in a row, accomplished by Tom Seaver in 1970.
- With a .330 average, 44 home runs and 139 RBIs, slugger Miguel Cabrera became the first player in 45 years to win the Triple Crown, leading the American League in all three categories. The last player to accomplish this feat was Carl Yastrzemski in 1967. He went on to win the 2012 AL Most Valuable Player Award. He also won this year's AL Hank Aaron Award, and the AL Silver Slugger Award.
- Starters Justin Verlander and Max Scherzer finished first and second among the American League strikeout leaders, with 239 and 231, respectively. Verlander finished second in a very close AL Cy Young Award race for 2012, collecting 149 points (12 first-place votes) to 153 points (13 first-place votes) for Tampa Bay Rays starter David Price.
- On October 13, during Game 1 of the ALCS, Delmon Young hit his sixth career post-season home run, setting a new franchise record. Young later won the ALCS MVP Award.
- Outfielder Austin Jackson won the Wilson Defensive Player of the Year Award.

=== All-Stars ===
The Tigers sent three players to the All-Star Game: pitcher Justin Verlander (fifth appearance), third baseman Miguel Cabrera (seventh appearance, third with the Tigers), and first baseman Prince Fielder (fourth appearance, first with the Tigers). Fielder was voted in as a starter, and won the Home Run Derby with 28 home runs, the second time in his career and his first with the Tigers. Fielder also won a Silver Slugger Award.

== Standings ==
=== 2012 American League Central ===
AL Central
Team	W	L	Pct.	GB	Home	Road
Detroit Tigers	88	74	.543	—	50‍–‍31	38‍–‍43
Chicago White Sox	85	77	.525	3	45‍–‍36	40‍–‍41
Kansas City Royals	72	90	.444	16	37‍–‍44	35‍–‍46
Cleveland Indians	68	94	.420	20	37‍–‍44	31‍–‍50
Minnesota Twins	66	96	.407	22	31‍–‍50	35‍–‍46

=== 2012 American League playoff teams ===
Division winners
Team	W	L	Pct.
New York Yankees	95	67	.586
Oakland Athletics	94	68	.580
Detroit Tigers	88	74	.543

Wild Card teams (Top 2 teams qualify for postseason)
Team	W	L	Pct.	GB
Texas Rangers	93	69	.574	—
Baltimore Orioles	93	69	.574	—
Tampa Bay Rays	90	72	.556	3
Los Angeles Angels	89	73	.549	4
Chicago White Sox	85	77	.525	8
Seattle Mariners	75	87	.463	18
Toronto Blue Jays	73	89	.451	20
Kansas City Royals	72	90	.444	21
Boston Red Sox	69	93	.426	24
Cleveland Indians	68	94	.420	25
Minnesota Twins	66	96	.407	27

== Game log ==
=== Regular season ===
2012 game log (88–74)
April (11–11)

#	Date	Opponent	Score	Win	Loss	Save	Crowd	Record
1	April 5	Red Sox	W 3–2	Valverde (1–0)	Melancon (0–1)		45,027	1–0
2	April 7	Red Sox	W 10–0	Below (1–0)	Beckett (0–1)		44,710	2–0
3	April 8	Red Sox	W 13–12 (11)	Below (2–0)	Melancon (0–2)		30,788	3–0
4	April 10	Rays	W 5–2	Coke (1–0)	McGee (0–1)	Valverde (1)	22,574	4–0
5	April 11	Rays	L 4–2	Shields (1–0)	Verlander (0–1)	Rodney (3)	28,180	4–1
6	April 12	Rays	W 7–2	Balester (1–0)	Niemann (0–1)		30,288	5–1
7	April 13	@ White Sox	L 5–2	Peavy (1–0)	Scherzer (0–1)	Santiago (3)	38,676	5–2
8	April 14	@ White Sox	L 5–1	Floyd (1–1)	Wilk (0–1)		33,025	5–3
9	April 15	@ White Sox	W 5–2	Porcello (1–0)	Sale (1–1)		25,143	6–3
10	April 16	@ Royals	W 3–2	Verlander (1–1)	Duffy (1–1)		14,039	7–3
11	April 17	@ Royals	W 3–1	Dotel (1–0)	Chen (0–1)	Valverde (2)	13,851	8–3
12	April 18	@ Royals	W 4–3	Scherzer (1–1)	Mijares (0–1)	Valverde (3)	14,083	9–3
13	April 19	Rangers	L 10–3	Darvish (2–0)	Wilk (0–2)		30,029	9–4
–	April 20	Rangers	Postponed (rain). Rescheduled for April 21.					
14	April 21	Rangers	L 10–4	Harrison (3–0)	Porcello (1–1)		41,427	9–5
15	April 21	Rangers	W 3–2	Verlander (2–1)	Feliz (1–1)	Valverde (4)	35,001	10–5
16	April 22	Rangers	L 3–2 (11)	Ross (3–0)	Weber (0–1)	Nathan (4)	36,255	10–6
17	April 24	Mariners	L 7–4	Vargas (3–1)	Scherzer (1–2)	League (6)	30,073	10–7
18	April 25	Mariners	L 9–1	Hernández (2–1)	Wilk (0–3)		28,527	10–8
19	April 26	Mariners	L 5–4	Furbush (1–1)	Porcello (1–2)	League (7)	31,451	10–9
20	April 27	@ Yankees	L 7–6	Rivera (1–1)	Villarreal (0–1)		41,200	10–10
21	April 28	@ Yankees	W 7–5	Smyly (1–0)	García (0–2)		44,686	11–10
22	April 29	@ Yankees	L 2–6	Sabathia (3–0)	Scherzer (1–3)		43,084	11–11
–	April 30	Royals	Postponed (rain). Rescheduled for September 24.					

May (13–16)

#	Date	Opponent	Score	Win	Loss	Save	Crowd	Record
23	May 1	Royals	W 9–3	Porcello (2–2)	Hochevar (2–2)		30,159	12–11
24	May 2	Royals	L 3–2	Collins (1–0)	Benoit (0–1)	Broxton (4)	33,187	12–12
25	May 4	White Sox	W 5–4	Valverde (2–0)	Thornton (1–1)		33,165	13–12
26	May 5	White Sox	L 3–2	Jones (1–0)	Valverde (2–1)	Reed (1)	42,404	13–13
27	May 6	White Sox	W 3–1	Porcello (3–2)	Axelrod (0–1)	Valverde (5)	39,558	14–13
28	May 7	@ Mariners	L 3–2	Delabar (1–0)	Dotel (1–1)		14,462	14–14
29	May 8	@ Mariners	W 6–4	Verlander (3–1)	Millwood (0–4)	Valverde (6)	13,455	15–14
30	May 9	@ Mariners	L 2–1	Vargas (4–2)	Putkonen (0–1)	League (8)	15,655	15–15
31	May 10	@ Athletics	W 10–6	Scherzer (2–3)	Colón (3–3)		11,513	16–15
32	May 11	@ Athletics	L 11–4	Milone (5–2)	Porcello (3–3)		26,721	16–16
33	May 12	@ Athletics	L 3–1	McCarthy (3–3)	Fister (0–1)	Fuentes (2)	22,077	16–17
34	May 13	@ Athletics	W 3–1	Verlander (4–1)	Parker (1–1)	Valverde (7)	17,147	17–17
35	May 14	@ White Sox	L 7–5	Stewart (1–1)	Putkonen (0–2)	Reed (3)	25,538	17–18
36	May 15	@ White Sox	W 10–8	Balester (2–0)	Ohman (0–2)	Dotel (1)	21,473	18–18
37	May 16	Twins	L 11–7	Burnett (1–0)	Below (2–1)		33,955	18–19
38	May 17	Twins	L 4–3	Walters (1–1)	Fister (0–2)	Capps (8)	37,840	18–20
39	May 18	Pirates	W 6–0	Verlander (5–1)	Morton (2–4)		41,661	19–20
40	May 19	Pirates	L 4–3	Burnett (2–2)	Smyly (1–1)	Hanrahan (9)	42,953	19–21
41	May 20	Pirates	W 4–3	Scherzer (3–3)	Correia (1–5)	Benoit (1)	39,971	20–21
42	May 22	@ Indians	L 5–3	Jiménez (5–3)	Porcello (3–4)	Perez (14)	15,049	20–22
43	May 23	@ Indians	L 4–2	Pestano (2–0)	Coke (1–1)	Perez (15)	22,000	20–23
44	May 24	@ Indians	L 2–1	Masterson (2–3)	Verlander (5–2)	Perez (16)	23,622	20–24
45	May 25	@ Twins	W 10–6	Smyly (2–1)	Swarzak (0–4)		37,688	21–24
46	May 26	@ Twins	W 6–3	Scherzer (4–3)	Pavano (2–4)	Valverde (8)	37,360	22–24
47	May 27	@ Twins	W 4–3	Villarreal (1–1)	Capps (0–3)	Valverde (9)	38,710	23–24
48	May 28	@ Red Sox	L 7–4	Doubront (5–2)	Fister (0–3)		37,921	23–25
49	May 29	@ Red Sox	L 6–3	Bard (5–5)	Verlander (5–3)	Aceves (12)	37,216	23–26
50	May 30	@ Red Sox	L 6–4	Albers (1–0)	Dotel (1–2)	Aceves (13)	37,195	23–27
51	May 31	@ Red Sox	W 7–3	Scherzer (5–3)	Beckett (4–5)		37,629	24–27

June (14–13)

#	Date	Opponent	Score	Win	Loss	Save	Crowd	Record
52	June 1	Yankees	L 9–4	Sabathia (7–2)	Crosby (0–1)	Soriano (7)	41,831	24–28
53	June 2	Yankees	W 4–3	Valverde (3–1)	Phelps (1–2)		44,593	25–28
54	June 3	Yankees	L 5–1	Hughes (5–5)	Verlander (5–4)		42,419	25–29
55	June 5	Indians	L 4–2	Jiménez (6–4)	Smyly (2–2)	Perez (18)	33,258	25–30
56	June 6	Indians	L 9–6	Gómez (4–4)	Scherzer (5–4)	Perez (19)	31,350	25–31
57	June 7	Indians	W 7–5	Crosby (1–1)	Lowe (7–4)	Valverde (10)	40,851	26–31
58	June 8	@ Reds	L 6–5 (10)	LeCure (2–1)	Coke (1–2)		38,563	26–32
59	June 9	@ Reds	W 3–2	Villarreal (2–1)	Marshall (1–3)	Valverde (11)	42,443	27–32
60	June 10	@ Reds	W 7–6	Villarreal (3–1)	Chapman (4–2)	Valverde (12)	34,056	28–32
61	June 12	@ Cubs	L 4–3	Mármol (1–2)	Coke (1–3)	Camp (1)	41,164	28–33
62	June 13	@ Cubs	W 8–4	Porcello (4–4)	Garza (2–5)		41,326	29–33
63	June 14	@ Cubs	W 5–3	Verlander (6–4)	Wood (0–3)	Valverde (13)	42,292	30–33
64	June 15	Rockies	L 12–4 (10)	Belisle (3–2)	Valverde (3–2)		41,878	30–34
65	June 16	Rockies	W 4–1	Fister (1–3)	Friedrich (4–3)		41,800	31–34
66	June 17	Rockies	W 5–0	Scherzer (6–4)	Guthrie (3–6)		40,619	32–34
67	June 19	Cardinals	W 6–3	Verlander (7–4)	Lynn (10–3)	Coke (1)	36,733	33–34
68	June 20	Cardinals	L 3–1	Westbrook (6–6)	Porcello (4–5)		38,871	33–35
69	June 21	Cardinals	W 2–1 (10)	Benoit (1–1)	Marté (0–1)		40,776	34–35
70	June 22	@ Pirates	L 4–1	Burnett (8–2)	Fister (1–4)	Hanrahan (18)	37,965	34–36
71	June 23	@ Pirates	L 4–1	Lincoln (4–2)	Scherzer (6–5)	Hanrahan (19)	38,734	34–37
72	June 24	@ Pirates	W 3–2	Verlander (8–4)	Resop (0–3)		35,179	35–37
73	June 25	@ Rangers	W 8–2	Porcello (5–5)	Grimm (1–1)		36,920	36–37
74	June 26	@ Rangers	L 7–5	Darvish (10–4)	Smyly (2–3)	Nathan (17)	39,561	36–38
75	June 27	@ Rangers	L 13–9	Oswalt (2–0)	Fister (1–5)		43,379	36–39
76	June 28	@ Rays	W 5–2	Scherzer (7–5)	Shields (7–5)	Valverde (14)	20,532	37–39
77	June 29	@ Rays	L 4–2	Price (11–4)	Verlander (8–5)	Rodney (22)	19,557	37–40
78	June 30	@ Rays	W 6–2	Porcello (6–5)	Hellickson (4–4)		29,443	38–40

July (16–10)

#	Date	Opponent	Score	Win	Loss	Save	Crowd	Record
79	July 1	@ Rays	W 5–3	Smyly (3–3)	Cobb (3–5)	Valverde (15)	21,874	39–40
80	July 2	Twins	L 6–4	Swarzak (2–4)	Fister (1–6)	Perkins (3)	37,406	39–41
81	July 3	Twins	L 8–6	Gray (5–0)	Villarreal (3–2)	Perkins (4)	36,757	39–42
82	July 4	Twins	W 5–1	Verlander (9–5)	Duensing (1–5)		41,023	40–42
83	July 5	Twins	W 7–3	Dotel (2–2)	Burnett (2–1)		33,350	41–42
84	July 6	Royals	W 4–2	Smyly (4–3)	Sánchez (1–5)	Valverde (16)	39,144	42–42
85	July 7	Royals	W 8–7	Fister (2–6)	Chen (7–8)		39,392	43–42
86	July 8	Royals	W 7–1	Scherzer (8–5)	Teaford (1–2)		36,693	44–42
87	July 13	@ Orioles	W 7–2	Fister (3–6)	Hammel (8–6)		35,566	45–42
88	July 14	@ Orioles	L 8–6 (13)	Gregg (3–2)	Benoit (1–2)		43,125	45–43
89	July 15	@ Orioles	W 4–0	Verlander (10–5)	González (1–1)		30,439	46–43
90	July 16	Angels	W 8–6	Dotel (3–2)	Hawkins (2–2)	Valverde (17)	36,806	47–43
91	July 17	Angels	L 13–0	Richards (3–1)	Turner (0–1)		33,950	47–44
92	July 18	Angels	W 7–2	Fister (4–6)	Wilson (9–6)		37,915	48–44
93	July 19	Angels	W 5–1	Scherzer (9–5)	Williams (6–7)		40,311	49–44
94	July 20	White Sox	W 4–2	Verlander (11–5)	Peavy (7–7)	Valverde (18)	44,572	50–44
95	July 21	White Sox	W 7–1	Porcello (7–5)	Sale (11–3)		42,888	51–44
96	July 22	White Sox	W 6–4	Turner (1–1)	Humber (4–5)	Benoit (2)	41,281	52–44
97	July 24	@ Indians	L 3–2	Smith (6–2)	Fister (4–7)	Perez (28)	23,637	52–45
98	July 25	@ Indians	W 5–3	Scherzer (10–5)	Lowe (8–9)	Valverde (19)	24,029	53–45
99	July 26	@ Indians	L 5–3	Smith (7–2)	Verlander (11–6)	Perez (29)	34,579	53–46
100	July 27	@ Blue Jays	L 8–3	Villanueva (6–0)	Porcello (7–6)		33,962	53–47
101	July 28	@ Blue Jays	L 5–1	Álvarez (7–7)	Sánchez (5–8)		41,832	53–48
102	July 29	@ Blue Jays	W 4–1	Fister (5–7)	Cecil (2–4)	Valverde (20)	35,975	54–48
103	July 30	@ Red Sox	L 7–3	Buchholz (9–3)	Scherzer (10–6)		37,784	54–49
104	July 31	@ Red Sox	L 4–1 (6)	Mortensen (1–0)	Verlander (11–7)	Morales (1)	37,275	54–50

August (16–11)

#	Date	Opponent	Score	Win	Loss	Save	Crowd	Record
105	August 1	@ Red Sox	W 7–5	Porcello (8–6)	Cook (2–5)	Valverde (21)	37,213	55–50
106	August 3	Indians	W 10–2	Sánchez (6–8)	Masterson (7–10)		41,501	56–50
107	August 4	Indians	W 6–1	Fister (6–7)	Jiménez (8–11)		42,744	57–50
108	August 5	Indians	W 10–8 (10)	Downs (1–0)	Perez (0–3)		38,007	58–50
109	August 6	Yankees	W 7–2	Verlander (12–7)	Nova (10–6)		41,381	59–50
110	August 7	Yankees	W 6–5	Porcello (9–6)	Hughes (11–9)	Valverde (22)	39,760	60–50
111	August 8	Yankees	L 12–8	Sabathia (12–3)	Sánchez (6–9)		41,879	60–51
112	August 9	Yankees	L 4–3	Rapada (3–0)	Benoit (1–3)	Soriano (27)	40,940	60–52
113	August 10	@ Rangers	W 6–2	Scherzer (11–6)	Feldman (6–7)		47,255	61–52
114	August 11	@ Rangers	L 2–1	Adams (2–3)	Villarreal (3–3)		48,303	61–53
115	August 12	@ Rangers	L 8–3	Darvish (12–8)	Porcello (9–7)		45,752	61–54
116	August 13	@ Twins	L 9–3	Deduno (4–0)	Sánchez (6–10)		34,366	61–55
117	August 14	@ Twins	W 8–4	Fister (7–7)	Duensing (2–8)		37,544	62–55
118	August 15	@ Twins	W 5–1	Scherzer (12–6)	De Vries (2–4)		37,118	63–55
119	August 17	Orioles	W 5–3	Benoit (2–3)	O'Day (6–1)	Valverde (23)	41,620	64–55
120	August 18	Orioles	L 3–2	Britton (2–1)	Porcello (9–8)	Johnson (36)	42,132	64–56
121	August 19	Orioles	L 7–5	Chen (12–7)	Fister (7–8)	Johnson (37)	40,511	64–57
122	August 21	Blue Jays	W 5–3	Scherzer (13–6)	Romero (8–11)	Valverde (24)	39,499	65–57
123	August 22	Blue Jays	W 3–2	Sánchez (7–10)	Laffey (3–5)	Valverde (25)	37,225	66–57
124	August 23	Blue Jays	W 3–2 (11)	Benoit (3–3)	Jenkins (0–1)		39,910	67–57
125	August 24	Angels	L 2–1	Greinke (11–5)	Porcello (9–9)	Richards (1)	39,356	67–58
126	August 25	Angels	W 5–3	Dotel (4–2)	Richards (3–3)	Valverde (26)	41,970	68–58
127	August 26	Angels	W 5–2	Scherzer (14–6)	Santana (7–11)		40,074	69–58
128	August 28	@ Royals	L 9–8	Crow (3–1)	Villarreal (3–4)	Holland (8)	13,601	69–59
129	August 29	@ Royals	L 1–0	Chen (10–10)	Sánchez (7–11)	Holland (9)	13,024	69–60
130	August 30	@ Royals	L 2–1	Guthrie (6–12)	Porcello (9–10)	Herrera (1)	12,997	69–61
131	August 31	White Sox	W 7–4	Dotel (5–2)	Peavy (9–10)	Valverde (27)	36,721	70–61

September (16–12)

#	Date	Opponent	Score	Win	Loss	Save	Crowd	Record
132	September 1	White Sox	W 5–1	Scherzer (15–6)	Liriano (5–11)		40,059	71–61
133	September 2	White Sox	W 4–2	Verlander (13–7)	Sale (15–6)	Valverde (28)	42,192	72–61
134	September 3	Indians	L 3–2	Kluber (1–3)	Downs (1–1)	Pestano (2)	35,418	72–62
135	September 4	Indians	L 3–2	Masterson (11–12)	Porcello (9–11)	Perez (34)	27,729	72–63
136	September 5	Indians	W 7–1	Fister (8–8)	Jiménez (9–15)		28,881	73–63
137	September 7	@ Angels	L 3–2	Frieri (4–0)	Dotel (5–3)		40,104	73–64
138	September 8	@ Angels	L 6–1	Wilson (12–9)	Verlander (13–8)		41,154	73–65
139	September 9	@ Angels	L 3–2	Greinke (14–5)	Sánchez (7–12)	Frieri (18)	38,216	73–66
140	September 10	@ White Sox	L 6–1	Quintana (6–4)	Porcello (9–12)		30,287	73–67
141	September 11	@ White Sox	W 5–3	Fister (9–8)	Peavy (10–11)	Valverde (29)	26,504	74–67
142	September 12	@ White Sox	W 8–6	Scherzer (16–6)	Floyd (9–10)	Valverde (30)	30,667	75–67
–	September 13	@ White Sox	Postponed (rain). Rescheduled for September 17.					
143	September 14	@ Indians	W 4–0	Verlander (14–8)	Kluber (1–4)		17,185	76–67
144	September 15	@ Indians	W 5–3	Sánchez (8–12)	Masterson (11–14)	Valverde (31)	22,849	77–67
145	September 16	@ Indians	L 7–6	Rogers (2–3)	Valverde (3–3)		17,233	77–68
146	September 17	@ White Sox	L 5–4	Jones (8–0)	Fister (9–9)	Reed (27)	29,130	77–69
147	September 18	Athletics	W 12–2	Downs (2–1)	Griffin (6–1)		31,243	78–69
148	September 19	Athletics	W 6–2	Verlander (15–8)	Anderson (4–2)		29,734	79–69
149	September 20	Athletics	L 12–4	Neshek (2–1)	Sánchez (8–13)		34,635	79–70
–	September 21	Twins	Postponed (rain). Rescheduled for September 23.					
150	September 22	Twins	W 8–0	Fister (10–9)	Deduno (6–5)		40,586	80–70
151	September 23	Twins	L 10–4	Diamond (12–8)	Scherzer (16–7)		40,438	80–71
152	September 23	Twins	L 2–1 (10)	Burton (2–1)	Valverde (3–4)	Perkins (14)	39,839	80–72
153	September 24	Royals	W 6–2	Verlander (16–8)	Hochevar (8–15)		31,521	81–72
154	September 25	Royals	W 2–0	Sánchez (9–13)	Chen (11–13)		29,048	82–72
155	September 26	Royals	W 5–4	Benoit (4–3)	Herrera (4–3)	Valverde (32)	32,360	83–72
156	September 27	Royals	W 5–4	Benoit (5–3)	Collins (5–4)		33,019	84–72
157	September 28	@ Twins	L 4–2	Burton (3–1)	Villarreal (3–5)	Perkins (16)	30,315	84–73
158	September 29	@ Twins	W 6–4	Verlander (17–8)	Walters (2–5)	Valverde (33)	32,839	85–73
159	September 30	@ Twins	W 2–1	Coke (2–3)	Burton (3–2)	Valverde (34)	32,554	86–73

October (2–1)

#	Date	Opponent	Score	Win	Loss	Save	Crowd	Record
160	October 1	@ Royals	W 6–3	Porcello (10–12)	Chen (11–14)	Valverde (35)	15,312	87–73
161	October 2	@ Royals	L 4–2	Guthrie (8–12)	Fister (10–10)	Holland (16)	14,283	87–74
162	October 3	@ Royals	W 1–0	Marte (1–0)	Mendoza (8–10)	Putkonen (1)	30,383	88–74

=== Postseason ===
==== American League Division Series ====
American League Division Series vs Oakland Athletics (Tigers win series 3–2)

#	Date	Opponent	Score	Win	Loss	Save	Crowd	Record
1	October 6	Athletics	W 3–1	Verlander (1–0)	Parker (0–1)	Valverde (1)	43,323	1–0
2	October 7	Athletics	W 5–4	Alburquerque (1–0)	Balfour (0–1)		40,684	2–0
3	October 9	@ Athletics	L 2–0	Anderson (1–0)	Sánchez (0–1)	Balfour (1)	37,090	2–1
4	October 10	@ Athletics	L 4–3	Cook (1–0)	Valverde (0–1)		36,385	2–2
5	October 11	@ Athletics	W 6–0	Verlander (2–0)	Parker (0–2)		36,393	3–2

==== American League Championship Series ====
American League Championship Series vs New York Yankees (Tigers win series 4–0)

#	Date	Opponent	Score	Win	Loss	Save	Crowd	Record
1	October 13	@ Yankees	W 6–4 (12)	Smyly (1–0)	Phelps (0–1)		47,122	1–0
2	October 14	@ Yankees	W 3–0	Sánchez (1–0)	Kuroda (0–1)	Coke (1)	47,082	2–0
3	October 16	Yankees	W 2–1	Verlander (1–0)	Hughes (0–1)	Coke (2)	42,970	3–0
–	October 17	Yankees	Postponed (rain). Rescheduled for October 18.					
4	October 18	Yankees	W 8–1	Scherzer (1–0)	Sabathia (0–1)		42,477	4–0

==== World Series ====
World Series vs San Francisco Giants (Giants win series 4–0)

#	Date	Opponent	Score	Win	Loss	Save	Crowd	Record
1	October 24	@ Giants	L 8–3	Zito (1–0)	Verlander (0–1)		42,855	0–1
2	October 25	@ Giants	L 2–0	Bumgarner (1–0)	Fister (0–1)	Romo (1)	42,982	0–2
3	October 27	Giants	L 2–0	Vogelsong (1–0)	Sánchez (0–1)	Romo (2)	42,262	0–3
4	October 28	Giants	L 4–3 (10)	Casilla (1–0)	Coke (0–1)	Romo (3)	42,152	0–4

=== Record vs. opponents ===
2012 American League record Source: MLB Standings Grid – 2012
Team	BAL	BOS	CWS	CLE	DET	KC	LAA	MIN	NYY	OAK	SEA	TB	TEX	TOR	NL
Baltimore	–	13–5	6–2	4–4	3–3	5–4	2–7	5–2	9–9	4–5	8–1	10–8	2–5	11–7	11–7
Boston	5–13	–	6–2	5–3	5–5	4–3	0–6	4–3	5–13	1–8	5–4	9–9	2–6	7–11	11–7
Chicago	2–6	2–6	–	11–7	6–12	6–12	3–5	14–4	5–2	3–3	8–1	4–3	6–3	6–4	9–9
Cleveland	4–4	3–5	7–11	–	10–8	8–10	5–4	6–12	1–5	2–8	4–4	4–4	4–5	2–4	8–10
Detroit	3–3	5–5	12–6	8–10	–	13–5	5–5	10–8	4–6	4–3	1–5	5–2	3–7	4–2	11–7
Kansas City	4–5	3–4	12–6	10–8	5–13	–	4–5	7–11	3–4	5–4	1–7	4–2	4–5	2–6	8–10
Los Angeles	7–2	6–0	5–3	4–5	5–5	5–4	–	6–3	4–5	9–10	11–8	1–9	10–9	4–4	12–6
Minnesota	2–5	3–4	4–14	12–6	8–10	11–7	3–6	–	3–4	4–5	2–8	1–5	2–8	2–5	9–9
New York	9–9	13–5	2–5	5–1	6–4	4–3	5–4	4–3	–	5–5	6–3	8–10	4–3	11–7	13–5
Oakland	5–4	8–1	3–3	8–2	3–4	4–5	10–9	5–4	5–5	–	12–7	5–4	11–8	5–4	10–8
Seattle	1–8	4–5	1–8	4–4	5–1	7–1	8–11	8–2	3–6	7–12	–	4–6	9–10	6–3	8–10
Tampa Bay	8–10	9–9	3–4	4–4	2–5	2–4	9–1	5–1	10–8	4–5	6–4	–	5–4	14–4	9–9
Texas	5–2	6–2	3–6	5–4	7–3	5–4	9–10	8–2	3–4	8–11	10–9	4–5	–	6–3	14–4
Toronto	7–11	11–7	4–6	4–2	2–4	6–2	4–4	5–2	7–11	4–5	3–6	4–14	3–6	–	9–9

- Source: MLB Standings Grid – 2012

=== Roster ===
2012 Detroit Tigers
Roster
Pitchers: 62 Al Alburquerque; 31 Collin Balester; 64 Duane Below; 53 Joaquín Benoit; 40 Phil Coke; 45 Casey Crosby; 20 Octavio Dotel; 38 Darin Downs; 58 Doug Fister; 49 Luis Marte; 56 José Ortega; 48 Rick Porcello; 36 Luke Putkonen; 19 Aníbal Sánchez *; 37 Max Scherzer; 55 Daniel Schlereth; 33 Drew Smyly; 50 Jacob Turner *; 46 José Valverde; 35 Justin Verlander; 60 Brayan Villarreal; 54 Thad Weber; 57 Adam Wilk	Catchers: 13 Alex Avila; 19,50 Bryan Holaday; 9 Gerald Laird; 18 Omir Santos *; Infielders: 24 Miguel Cabrera; 28 Prince Fielder; 4 Omar Infante *; 15 Brandon Inge *; 27 Jhonny Peralta; 34 Hernán Pérez *; 39 Ramón Santiago; 29 Danny Worth; Outfielders: 18 Jeff Baker *; 52 Quintin Berry; 26 Brennan Boesch; 12 Andy Dirks; 34 Avisaíl García; 14 Austin Jackson; 32 Don Kelly; 25 Ryan Raburn; 36 Clete Thomas *; 21 Delmon Young; 38 Matt Young *; Other batters: 34 Brad Eldred *	Manager: 10 Jim Leyland; Coaches: 17 Rafael Belliard (infield); 61 Tom Brookens (first base); 51 Jeff Jones (pitching); 22 Gene Lamont (third base); 8 Lloyd McClendon (hitting); 99 Scott Pickens (bullpen catcher); 59 Mike Rojas (bullpen)

(*) = Was on team for part of 2012 season.

=== Batting ===
Note: G = Games played; AB = At bats; R = Runs scored; H = Hits; 2B = Doubles; 3B = Triples; HR = Home runs; RBI = Runs batted in; AVG = Batting average; SB = Stolen bases

Player	G	AB	R	H	2B	3B	HR	RBI	AVG	SB
Alex Avila	116	367	42	89	21	2	9	48	.243	2
Jeff Baker	15	35	1	7	2	0	0	4	.200	0
Quintin Berry	94	291	44	75	10	6	2	29	.258	21
Brennan Boesch	132	470	52	113	22	2	12	54	.240	6
Miguel Cabrera	161	622	109	205	40	0	44	139	.330	4
Andy Dirks	88	314	56	101	18	5	8	35	.322	1
Brad Eldred	5	16	1	3	1	1	0	1	.188	0
Prince Fielder	162	581	83	182	33	1	30	108	.313	1
Avisaíl García	23	47	7	15	0	0	0	3	.319	0
Bryan Holaday	6	12	3	3	1	0	0	0	.250	0
Omar Infante	64	226	27	58	7	5	4	20	.257	7
Brandon Inge	9	20	2	2	1	0	1	2	.100	0
Austin Jackson	137	543	103	163	29	10	16	66	.300	12
Don Kelly	75	113	14	21	2	1	1	7	.186	2
Gerald Laird	63	174	24	49	8	1	2	11	.282	0
Jhonny Peralta	150	531	58	127	32	3	13	63	.239	1
Hernán Pérez	2	2	1	1	0	0	0	0	.500	0
Ryan Raburn	66	205	14	35	14	0	1	12	.171	1
Ramón Santiago	93	228	19	47	7	1	2	17	.206	1
Omir Santos	3	8	0	1	0	0	0	1	.125	0
Clete Thomas	3	0	1	0	0	0	0	0	—	0
Danny Worth	43	74	9	16	3	0	0	3	.216	0
Delmon Young	151	574	54	153	27	1	18	74	.267	0
Matt Young	5	10	2	1	1	0	0	1	.100	0
Pitcher totals	162	13	0	0	0	0	0	0	.000	0
Team totals	162	5476	726	1467	279	39	163	698	.268	59

=== Starters ===
Note: W = Wins; L = Losses; ERA = Earned run average; G = Games pitched; GS = Games started; SV = Saves; IP = Innings pitched; R = Runs allowed; ER = Earned runs allowed; BB = Walks allowed; K = Strikeouts

Player	W	L	ERA	G	GS	SV	IP	R	ER	BB	K
Casey Crosby	1	1	9.49	3	3	0	12 1/3	13	13	11	9
Doug Fister	10	10	3.45	26	26	0	161 2/3	73	62	37	137
Rick Porcello	10	12	4.59	31	31	0	176 1/3	101	90	44	107
Aníbal Sánchez	4	6	3.74	12	12	0	74 2/3	36	31	15	57
Max Scherzer	16	7	3.74	32	32	0	187 2/3	82	78	60	231
Drew Smyly	4	3	3.99	23	18	0	99 1/3	49	44	33	94
Jacob Turner	1	1	8.03	3	3	0	12 1/3	11	11	7	7
Justin Verlander	17	8	2.64	33	33	0	238 1/3	81	70	60	239
Adam Wilk	0	3	8.18	3	3	0	11	11	10	3	7

=== Bullpen ===
Note: W = Wins; L = Losses; ERA = Earned run average; G = Games pitched; GS = Games started; SV = Saves; IP = Innings pitched; R = Runs allowed; ER = Earned runs allowed; BB = Walks allowed; K = Strikeouts

Player	W	L	ERA	G	GS	SV	IP	R	ER	BB	K
Al Alburquerque	0	0	0.68	8	0	0	13 1/3	1	1	8	18
Collin Balester	2	0	6.50	11	0	0	18	14	13	11	12
Duane Below	2	1	3.88	27	1	0	46 1/3	25	20	8	29
Joaquín Benoit	5	3	3.68	73	0	2	71	31	29	22	84
Phil Coke	2	3	4.00	66	0	1	54	28	24	18	51
Octavio Dotel	5	3	3.57	57	0	1	58	23	23	12	62
Darin Downs	2	1	3.48	18	0	0	20 2/3	8	8	9	20
Luis Marte	1	0	2.82	13	0	0	22 1/3	7	7	9	19
José Ortega	0	0	3.38	2	0	0	2 2/3	1	1	1	4
Luke Putkonen	0	2	3.94	12	0	1	16	7	7	8	10
Daniel Schlereth	0	0	10.29	6	0	0	7	10	8	5	6
José Valverde	3	4	3.78	71	0	35	69	34	29	27	48
Brayan Villarreal	3	5	2.63	50	0	0	54 2/3	20	16	28	66
Thad Weber	0	1	9.00	2	0	0	4	4	4	2	1
Team Pitching Totals	88	74	3.75	162	162	40	1430 2/3	670	596	438	1318

== Farm system ==
Level	Team	League	Manager
AAA	Toledo Mud Hens	International League	Phil Nevin
AA	Erie SeaWolves	Eastern League	Chris Cron
A	Lakeland Flying Tigers	Florida State League	Dave Huppert
A	West Michigan Whitecaps	Midwest League	Ernie Young
A-Short Season	Connecticut Tigers	New York–Penn League	Andrew Graham
Rookie	GCL Tigers	Gulf Coast League	Basilio Cabrera

LEAGUE CHAMPIONS: Lakeland
