= 2012 American League Championship Series =

43rd edition of Major League Baseball's American League Championship Series

Team (Wins)	Managers	Season
Detroit Tigers (4)	Jim Leyland	88–74 (.543), GA: 3
New York Yankees (0)	Joe Girardi	95–67 (.586), GA: 2
- Dates: October 13–18
- MVP: Delmon Young (Detroit)
- Umpires: Jeff Kellogg (crew chief), Rob Drake, Sam Holbrook, Jeff Nelson, Gary Cederstrom, Mike Winters

Broadcast
- Television: TBS; MLB International
- TV announcers: Ernie Johnson Jr., Ron Darling, John Smoltz, and Craig Sager (TBS); Gary Thorne and Rick Sutcliffe (MLB International)
- Radio: ESPN
- Radio announcers: Dan Shulman and Orel Hershiser
- ALDS: New York Yankees over Baltimore Orioles (3–2); Detroit Tigers over Oakland Athletics (3–2)

The 2012 American League Championship Series was a best-of-seven playoff pitting the top-seeded New York Yankees against the third-seeded Detroit Tigers for the American League pennant and the right to play in the 2012 World Series. The series, the 43rd in league history, began on Saturday, October 13 in New York and ended on Thursday, October 18 in Detroit. The Tigers swept the Yankees, winning the series 4–0. TBS televised all games in the United States. In global markets, MLB International broadcast the ALCS in its entirety, with long-time Baltimore Orioles announcer Gary Thorne and ESPN's Rick Sutcliffe calling the games.

This was the third postseason meeting between the Yankees and the Tigers, but the first in the ALCS. The Tigers previously beat the Yankees in the 2006 ALDS (3–1) and the 2011 ALDS (3–2). The last appearance for each team in the ALCS resulted in a loss to the Texas Rangers; the Yankees in the 2010 ALCS and the Tigers in the 2011 ALCS.

The Tigers would go on to lose in a sweep to the San Francisco Giants in the World Series. As of 2026, this is the last time a Detroit-based team won a conference championship in any of the four major leagues.

== Summary ==
=== New York Yankees vs. Detroit Tigers ===
Detroit won the series, 4–0.

Game	Date	Score	Location	Time	Attendance
1	October 13	Detroit Tigers – 6, New York Yankees – 4 (12)	Yankee Stadium	4:54	47,122
2	October 14	Detroit Tigers – 3, New York Yankees – 0	Yankee Stadium	3:18	47,082
3	October 16	New York Yankees – 1, Detroit Tigers – 2	Comerica Park	3:28	42,490
4	October 18†	New York Yankees – 1, Detroit Tigers – 8	Comerica Park	3:27	42,477

†: postponed from October 17 due to rain

== Game summaries ==
=== Game 1 ===
October 13, 2012 8:07 pm (EDT) at Yankee Stadium in Bronx, New York 49 °F (9 °C), clear
Team	1	2	3	4	5	6	7	8	9	10	11	12	R	H	E
Detroit	0	0	0	0	0	2	0	2	0	0	0	2	6	15	1
New York	0	0	0	0	0	0	0	0	4	0	0	0	4	11	0
WP: Drew Smyly (1–0) LP: David Phelps (0–1); Home runs: DET: Delmon Young (1); NYY: Ichiro Suzuki (1), Raúl Ibañez (1); Attendance: 47,122; Boxscore

The Yankees threatened in the first inning when they loaded the bases on three walks, but Jhonny Peralta robbed Alex Rodriguez of an RBI single with a diving stop to end the inning. Peralta also took away a run in the second when, with the bases loaded via three singles and two outs once again, Robinson Canó hit a ball that glanced off the wrist of Tiger starter Doug Fister and caromed to shortstop. Peralta fielded it and just nipped Canó at first, which was revealed to be the wrong call but was not overturned. The Yankees would leave the bases loaded for the third time in the game in the sixth inning, and were 1-for-10 with runners in scoring position, with the only hit being an infield single by Ichiro Suzuki that did not score a run.

Buoyed by Peralta's defense, Tigers starter Fister threw shutout ball into the seventh inning, scattering six hits. Postseason veteran Andy Pettitte almost matched him, pitching five shutout innings (and 6 2/3 innings overall) for the Yankees before cracking in the sixth. Austin Jackson hit a triple and after retiring Omar Infante, Pettitte intentionally walked Miguel Cabrera before giving up back-to-back RBI singles to Prince Fielder and Delmon Young. A home run by Delmon Young and an RBI single by Avisaíl García after a Peralta double in the eighth off Derek Lowe and Boone Logan, respectively, gave Detroit a 4–0 lead. In the bottom of the ninth, Detroit brought in José Valverde to get the final three outs.

Russell Martin led off the Yankees ninth with a single, and Ichiro Suzuki followed two batters later with a home run to cut the lead in half. Canó then struck out for the second out, and Valverde got to 0–2 on Mark Teixeira before walking him. ALDS hero Raúl Ibañez hit a game-tying home run, forcing extra innings.

Rafael Soriano and David Robertson each pitched one scoreless inning out of the bullpen, but the Yankees could not capitalize off Tiger relievers Octavio Dotel and Drew Smyly. Detroit finally broke the tie in the top of the 12th off reliever David Phelps. Phelps walked Cabrera to lead off, and Young followed with a double. Six pitches later, Derek Jeter broke his left ankle while stopping a groundball from Peralta, forcing him to miss the rest of the postseason. One batter later, Andy Dirks drove in an insurance run on a chopper that glanced off Phelps' pitching hand for an infield single. Smyly then pitched a scoreless bottom of the inning for the win and to put Detroit up 1-0 in the Series. Despite the loss, Ibañez's clutch homers in both the ALDS and ALCS brought him distinction as the only player to ever hit three home runs in the ninth inning or later in one postseason.

This was Derek Jeter's 158th and final playoff game. Before getting injured, Jeter recorded his 200th career postseason hit earlier in the game which is still the most all-time.

=== Game 2 ===
October 14, 2012 4:07 pm (EDT) at Yankee Stadium in Bronx, New York 72 °F (22 °C), sunny
Team	1	2	3	4	5	6	7	8	9	R	H	E
Detroit	0	0	0	0	0	0	1	2	0	3	8	1
New York	0	0	0	0	0	0	0	0	0	0	4	0
WP: Aníbal Sánchez (1–0) LP: Hiroki Kuroda (0–1) Sv: Phil Coke (1); Attendance: 47,082; Boxscore

Hiroki Kuroda retired the first 15 Detroit Tigers he faced and held the Tigers scoreless through six innings, allowing only one hit and no walks while striking out eight—including seven of the first nine batters. The Tigers' Aníbal Sánchez was nearly as efficient while keeping the Yankees scoreless, allowing three hits, striking out five and walking two.

The Tigers finally broke through with a run off Kuroda in the seventh. Quintin Berry doubled to lead off the inning, and advanced to third on a single by Miguel Cabrera. After Kuroda struck out Prince Fielder, Delmon Young hit an RBI force out, on which the potential double play relay throw was mishandled by Robinson Canó.

In the eighth, Kuroda struck out the first two batters he faced, then allowed a single to Omar Infante. Austin Jackson then singled to right. Nick Swisher fielded the ball and threw it to second as Infante ran past the base and attempted to get back. Baseman Robinson Canó's tag on Infante beat him touching the base, but umpire Jeff Nelson ruled him safe even though television replays confirmed he was out. Yankees Manager Joe Girardi argued during a pitching change and was ejected. The play would have resulted in the inning's third out, and the Tigers took advantage by getting two insurance runs on RBI singles by Avisaíl García off of Boone Logan and Miguel Cabrera off of Joba Chamberlain.

Prior to the game, Tiger manager Jim Leyland stated that struggling closer José Valverde, who had allowed seven runs in his last two postseason appearances, would not close Game 2 if the situation called for it. He instead used Phil Coke over the final two innings in this game, and Coke earned the save.

The Yankees' lineup continued its struggles in Game 2. Robinson Canó, batting second for the first time since September 2010, grounded out in all four times at bat, with this 0-for-4 performance resulting in an 0-for-26 hitless streak—the longest such barren streak in any single year of postseason play in MLB history. Alex Rodriguez took a called third strike on a changeup in the second and struck out on a foul tip in the fourth, dropping to 2-for-21 with no RBIs in the postseason, including 0-for-18 with 12 strikeouts against right-handers. Curtis Granderson fanned twice, falling to 3-for-25 with 13 strikeouts.

=== Game 3 ===
October 16, 2012 8:07 pm (EDT) at Comerica Park in Detroit, Michigan 53 °F (12 °C), clear
Team	1	2	3	4	5	6	7	8	9	R	H	E
New York	0	0	0	0	0	0	0	0	1	1	5	1
Detroit	0	0	0	1	1	0	0	0	X	2	7	0
WP: Justin Verlander (1–0) LP: Phil Hughes (0–1) Sv: Phil Coke (2); Home runs: NYY: Eduardo Núñez (1); DET: Delmon Young (2); Attendance: 42,490; Boxscore

Game 3 saw Justin Verlander pitch for the third time against the Yankees in postseason play. In the previous season's Division Series, Verlander struck out 11 batters, but in the process, he expended 120 pitches and gave up four runs. This time around was different, as the Yankees waited out pitches and struck out only three times against him. Nonetheless, Verlander took a shutout into the ninth inning. He allowed only a pair of singles by Ichiro Suzuki and a leadoff homer by Eduardo Núñez in the ninth. After Brett Gardner grounded out on Verlander's 132nd pitch of the night, the Tigers starter was lifted for Phil Coke. Coke induced a grounder from Suzuki for the second out of the inning, but then gave up consecutive singles to Mark Teixeira and Robinson Canó (Canó's single ended a personal 0-for-29 slump). Postseason star Raúl Ibañez worked Coke to a 3–2 count before striking out on a slider, giving Coke his second save in two games.

Delmon Young hit a home run (his seventh post-season home run with the Tigers) in the fourth off of Yankees starter Phil Hughes, who was then lifted because of a stiff back, and manager Joe Girardi's lineup shuffle had Alex Rodriguez benched again. Next inning, Quintin Berry reached first on Yankees third baseman Eric Chavez's error, stole second and scored on Miguel Cabrera's double off of David Phelps.

The home run by Núñez ended a streak of 30 1/3 scoreless innings by Tigers starters in the postseason, breaking the 1974 record of 29 innings set by the Oakland Athletics. The Tiger starters had also gone 37 straight innings without surrendering an earned run.

=== Game 4 ===
October 18, 2012 4:07 pm (EDT) at Comerica Park in Detroit, Michigan 59 °F (15 °C), partly cloudy
Team	1	2	3	4	5	6	7	8	9	R	H	E
New York	0	0	0	0	0	1	0	0	0	1	2	2
Detroit	1	0	1	4	0	0	1	1	X	8	16	1
WP: Max Scherzer (1–0) LP: CC Sabathia (0–1); Home runs: NYY: None; DET: Miguel Cabrera (1), Jhonny Peralta 2 (2), Austin Jackson (1); Attendance: 42,477; Boxscore

Game 4 was originally scheduled for October 17, 2012 - 8:07 pm (EDT), and was postponed due to rain.

Game 4 saw Detroit come out swinging early, going up 2–0 on RBI singles by Delmon Young in the first and Avisaíl García in the third. The Tigers broke this game open with a pair of two-run home runs by Miguel Cabrera and Jhonny Peralta. Yankee starter CC Sabathia exited after just 3 2/3 innings and allowing six runs, eventually taking the loss. The Tigers' Max Scherzer, meanwhile, maintained a no-hitter until the sixth inning, and struck out 10 batters in his 5 2/3 innings of work. The Yankees drove in one run in the sixth, when a triple by Eduardo Núñez was followed by a Nick Swisher double. Austin Jackson homered off of Derek Lowe in the seventh inning, and Peralta closed the scoring with his second homer in the eighth off of David Robertson, to give the Tigers an 8–1 lead. Former Yankee Phil Coke, who was on the 2009 World Series championship team, closed the game by pitching the final two innings, finishing the series and handing the Yankees their first postseason series sweep since the 1980 American League Championship Series, when they were swept by the Kansas City Royals. It was also the first time the Yankees were swept in a best-of-seven series since the 1976 World Series against the Cincinnati Reds and the 4th time overall.

Delmon Young, who hit .353 in the series with two home runs and six RBI, was named ALCS MVP for 2012.

The Yankees finished the 2012 postseason hitting a dismal .188, including batting only .157 against Tiger pitching in the ALCS. Tiger starters allowed only two earned runs in the ALCS, posting a 0.66 ERA, and the Yankees never held a lead in any inning of the series. Miguel Cabrera set a major league record by having at least one hit in all 17 of his League Championship Series games, besting the previous mark of 15 shared by Manny Ramirez and Pete Rose. Cabrera has also reached base safely in all 20 of his postseason games with the Tigers, a team record. The Tigers also became the first team to ever win three consecutive postseason series against the Yankees, having previously won in 2006 and 2011.

It would be the last time where the #1 seeded teams from every major professional sports league in North America were defeated until 2019.

== Composite line score ==
2012 ALCS (4–0): Detroit Tigers over New York Yankees

Team	1	2	3	4	5	6	7	8	9	10	11	12	R	H	E
Detroit Tigers	1	0	1	5	1	2	2	5	0	0	0	2	19	46	3
New York Yankees	0	0	0	0	0	1	0	0	5	0	0	0	6	22	3
Total attendance: 179,171 Average attendance: 44,793

== Aftermath ==
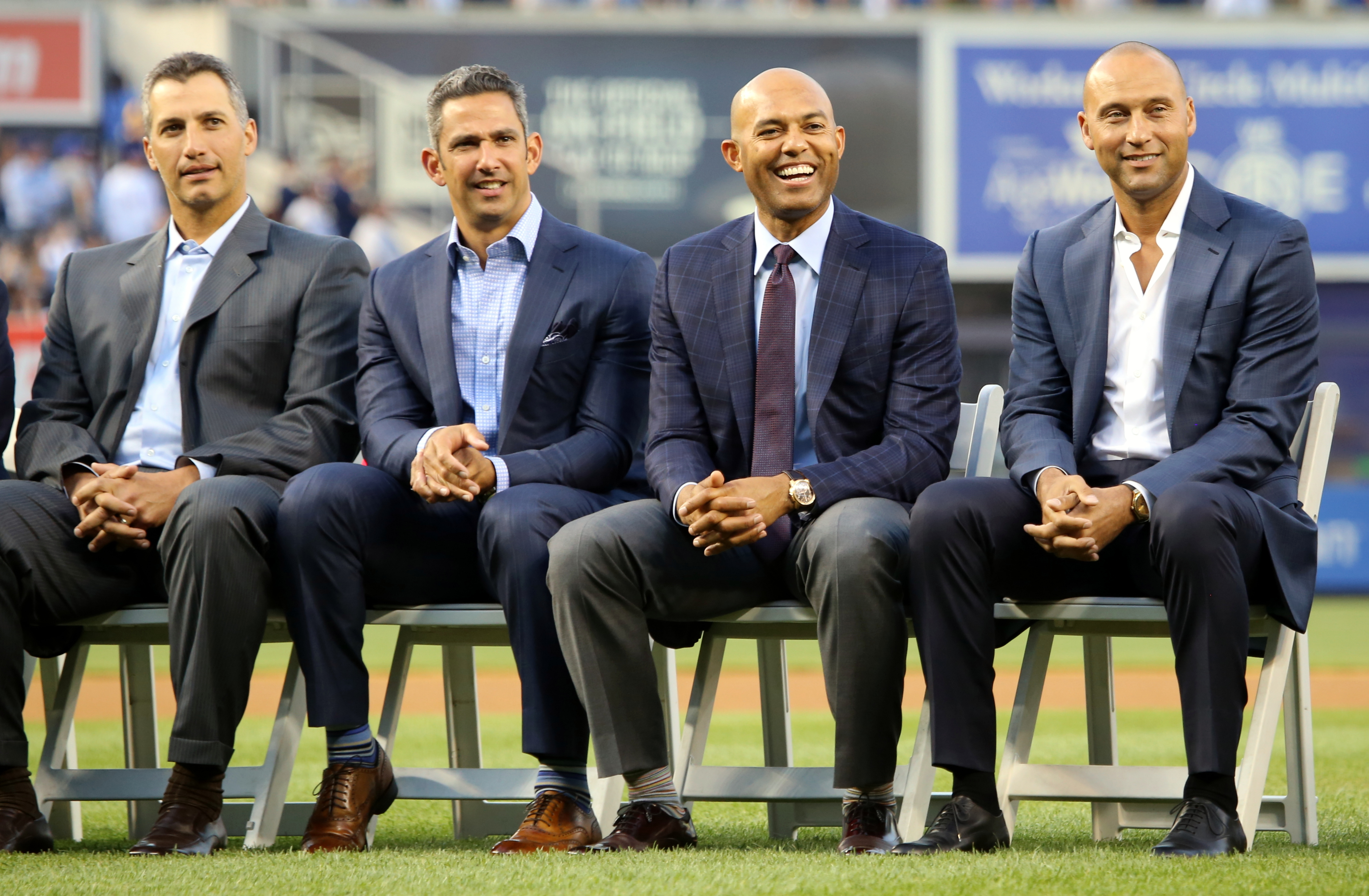
The Core Four in 2015. From left: Andy Pettitte, Jorge Posada, Mariano Rivera, and Derek Jeter.

In regards to playoff baseball, this would be it for the Core Four era Yankees. Jorge Posada retired just before the 2012 season, after losing playing time to Russell Martin. Andy Pettitte, who was the first player of the Core Four to retire on February 4, 2011, came out of retirement to pitch for the Yankees in 2012 and 2013, before retiring for good after the 2013 season. Mariano Rivera retired after the 2013 season as well, while Derek Jeter retired after 2014. Rivera and Jeter were inducted into the National Baseball Hall of Fame in 2019 and 2020, respectively (Jeter's 2020 induction was delayed a year due to the COVID-19 pandemic). The Yankees would not return to the American League Championship Series until 2017. Manager Joe Girardi, C.C. Sabathia, Brett Gardner, and David Robertson were the only Yankees on the 2017 club that played for the team in 2012. Robertson left the Yankees in free agency in 2015, but returned to the team at the 2017 trade deadline.

The 2017 Yankees also had trouble hitting Justin Verlander, just as the 2011–2012 teams did. During the 2017 ALCS, and now pitching for the Houston Astros, Verlander won the ALCS MVP after helping the Astros beat the Yankees in seven games. In that series, he allowed 1 run in 16 innings pitched, to go with 21 strikeouts.

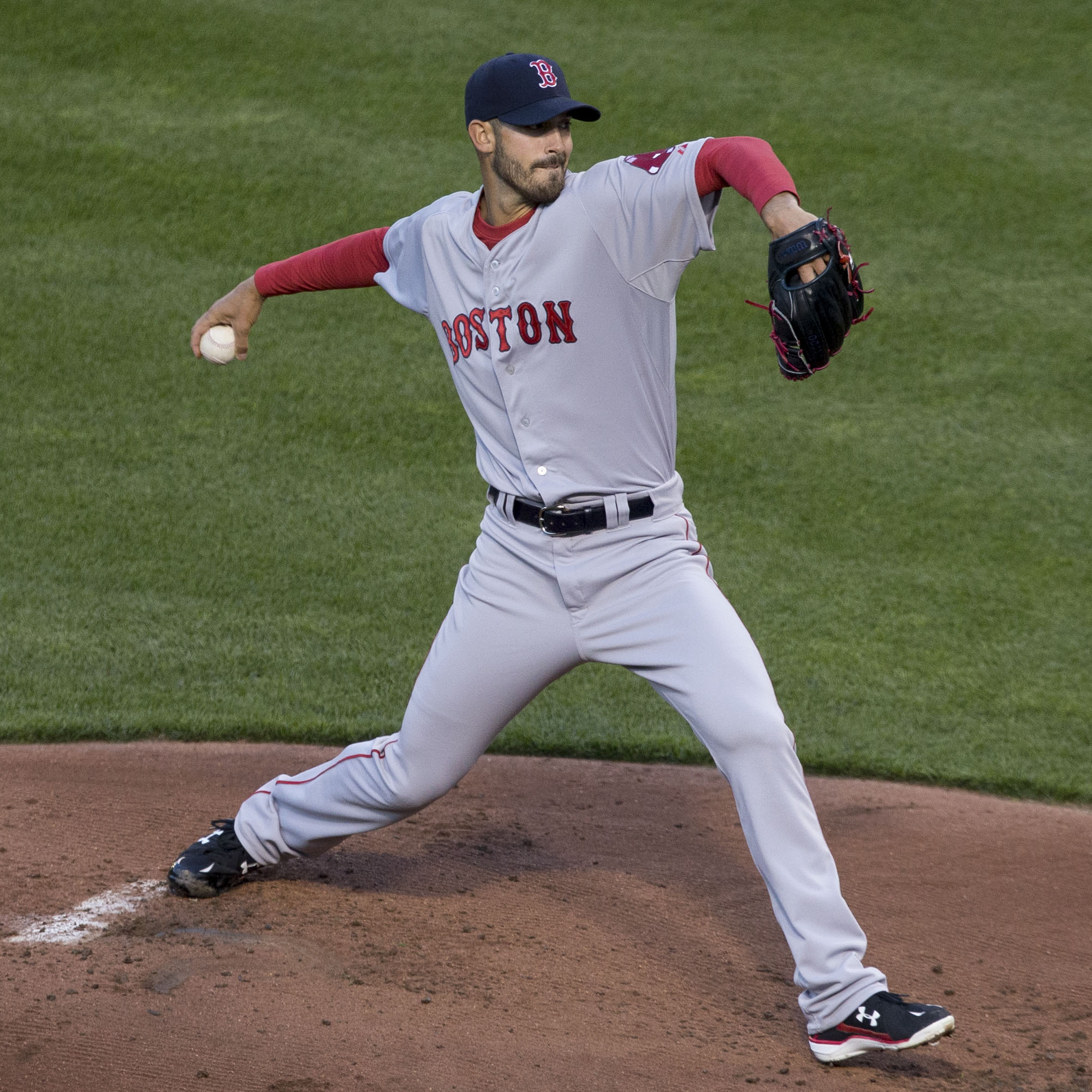
Porcello would reach his full potential in Boston by winning an AL Cy Young Award in 2016.

The Tigers returned to the American League Championship Series in 2013, but lost to the eventual champions Red Sox in six games. General manager Dave Dombrowski aggressively sought pitching improvements, despite having a rotation that featured Justin Verlander, Max Scherzer, Rick Porcello, and Anibal Sanchez. At the 2014 trade deadline, the Tigers traded for 2012 American League Cy Young award winner David Price. At the time, their rotation featured the last three Cy Young winners; 2011 (Verlander), 2012 (Price), and 2013 (Scherzer). Afterwards, Scherzer would win the National League equivalent of the award pitching for the Washington in 2016 and 2017, Porcello won an AL Cy Young pitching for Boston in 2016, and Verlander won the award again pitching for Houston in 2019 and 2022. As for the team, Tigers won the division AL Central for the fourth straight year in 2014, but were upset by the Orioles in the 2014 American League Division Series.

As of 2025, this is the most recent league or conference championship won by a Detroit-based team.
