= Matt Young (outfielder) =

American baseball player (born 1982)

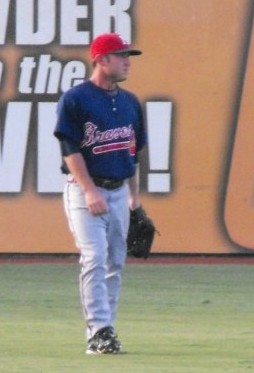
- Young with the Mississippi Braves in 2009
- Outfielder
- Born: October 3, 1982 (age 43); Temple, Texas, U.S.
- Batted: Left Threw: Right

MLB debut
- April 3, 2011, for the Atlanta Braves

Last MLB appearance
- June 13, 2012, for the Detroit Tigers

MLB statistics
- Batting average: .190
- Home runs: 0
- Runs batted in: 2
- Stats at Baseball Reference

Teams
- Atlanta Braves (2011); Detroit Tigers (2012)

Matthew Earl Young (born October 3, 1982) is an American former professional baseball outfielder. He played in Major League Baseball (MLB) for the Atlanta Braves and Detroit Tigers. Prior to playing professionally, Young attended Plano East Senior High School and the University of New Mexico.

== Amateur career ==
In 2002, as a freshman at the University of New Mexico, Young hit .385 with 17 stolen bases in 55 games, and was named the school's 2002 Male Athlete of the Year. In 2003, he hit .327 with 10 stolen bases in 56 games. In 2004, he hit .381 with 16 stolen bases in 56 games. Before he could return to UNM for his senior year, Young was signed by the Braves.

== Professional career ==
=== Atlanta Braves ===
In his first professional season, Young played for the Rome Braves and hit .312 with six home runs, 52 RBIs and 10 stolen bases in 114 games. The following season, he hit .274 with two home runs, 58 RBIs, and 22 stolen bases in 131 games between the Myrtle Beach Pelicans and Mississippi Braves. He played for the Pelicans and Mississippi Braves again in 2007, hitting a combined .269 with one home runs, 33 RBIs, and 14 stolen bases in 98 games.

With Mississippi again in 2008, Young hit .289 with three home runs, 50 RBIs and 30 stolen bases in 135 games. On June 27, 2008, he went 4–5, and set a new Southern League record of 11 consecutive hits. The previous mark of 10 consecutive hits had stood for 32 years. The Mississippi Braves won the Southern League Championship in 2008, and Young followed that by hitting .370 (40-for-108) with 10 doubles, three triples, one home run, and 24 RBIs in 29 games for the Mesa Solar Sox of the Arizona Fall League.

Young split 2009 between Mississippi and the Gwinnett Braves, hitting a combined .284 with five home runs, 36 RBIs, and 43 stolen bases in 137 games. He also earned his 2nd consecutive Southern League "Best Hustler" award.

With Gwinnett in 2010, Young hit .300 with three home runs, 35 RBIs and 39 stolen bases in 134 games.

On March 27, 2011 after performing well in the Atlanta Braves Spring Training camp, Young was informed that he had made one of the final bench spots on the major league club, placing him on the 25-man roster. In the third game of the season, Young made his Major-league debut, pinch-running for Chipper Jones and scoring a run.

=== Detroit Tigers ===
On January 22, 2012, Young signed a minor league contract with the Detroit Tigers that included an invitation to spring training. He began the year with the Triple-A Toledo Mud Hens. On June 3, the Tigers selected Young's contract, adding him to their active roster. In five appearances for Detroit, he went 1-for-10 (.100) with one RBI. Young was designated for assignment following the promotion of Darin Downs on July 3. Young was released by Detroit on August 10.

=== St. Louis Cardinals ===
On August 17, 2012, Young signed a minor league contract with the St. Louis Cardinals. In 13 appearances for the Triple-A Memphis Redbirds, he batted .442/.478/.488 with five RBI and two stolen bases. Young elected free agency following the season on November 2.

=== Los Angeles Angels ===
On November 20, 2012, Young signed a minor league contract with the Los Angeles Angels. In 41 appearances for the Triple-A Salt Lake Bees, he slashed .208/.327/.300 with two home runs, 13 RBI, and 11 stolen bases. Young was released by the Angels organization on June 26, 2013.

=== Piratas de Campeche ===
On July 2, 2013, Young signed with the Piratas de Campeche of the Mexican League. In 22 appearances for the Piratas, Young batted .286/.343/.407 with two home runs, 10 RBI, and five stolen bases.

== Coaching career ==
In 2019, Young was hired by the Toronto Blue Jays organization as a hitting coach for the High-A Dunedin Blue Jays.
