= Drew Smyly =

American baseball player (born 1989)

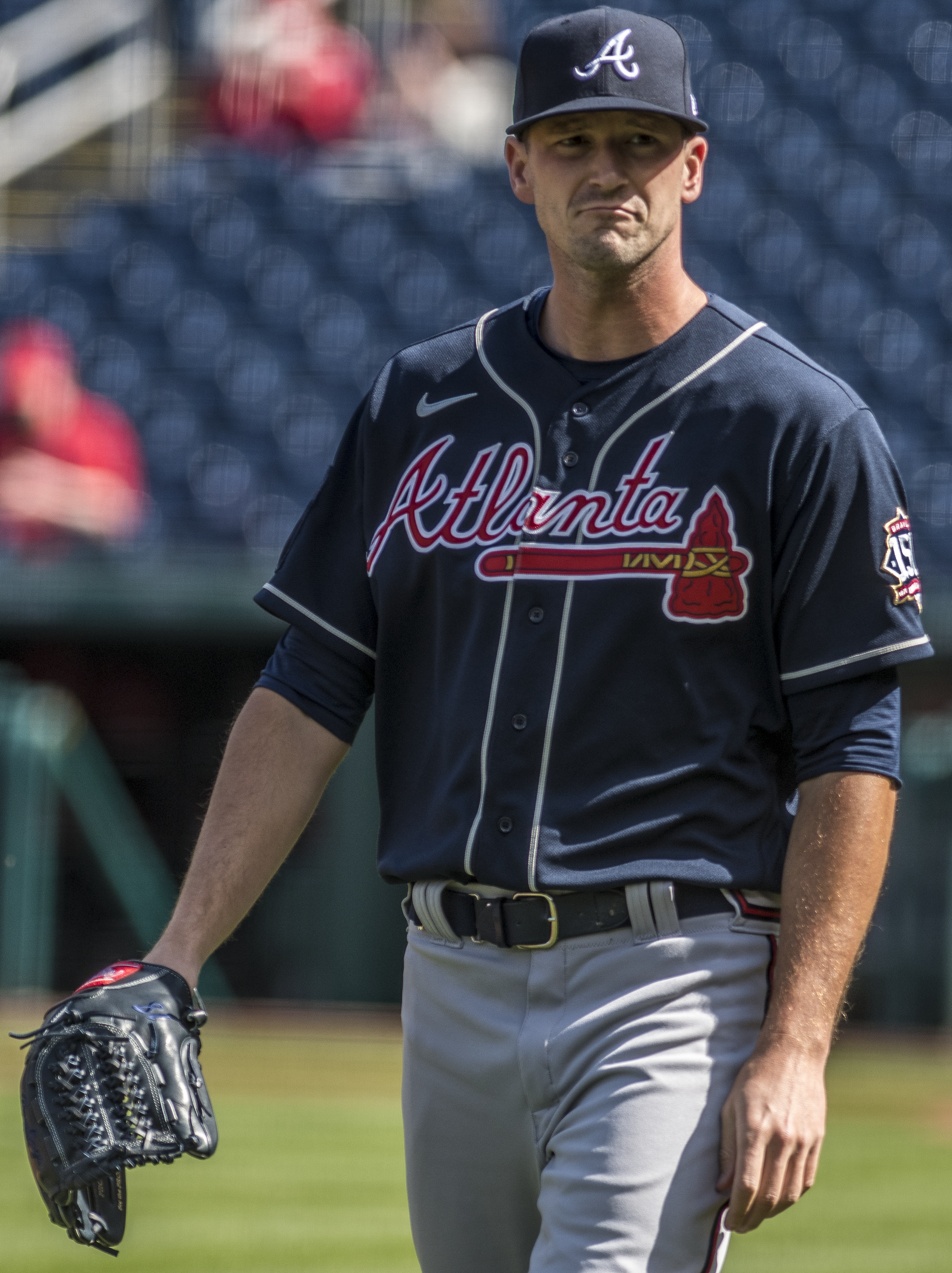
- Smyly with the Atlanta Braves in 2021
- Pitcher
- Born: June 13, 1989 (age 37); Little Rock, Arkansas, U.S.
- Batted: Left Threw: Left

MLB debut
- April 12, 2012, for the Detroit Tigers

Last MLB appearance
- September 29, 2024, for the Chicago Cubs

MLB statistics
- Win–loss record: 68–66
- Earned run average: 4.20
- Strikeouts: 1,119
- Stats at Baseball Reference

Teams
- Detroit Tigers (2012–2014); Tampa Bay Rays (2014–2016); Texas Rangers (2019); Philadelphia Phillies (2019); San Francisco Giants (2020); Atlanta Braves (2021); Chicago Cubs (2022–2024)

Career highlights and awards
- World Series champion (2021)
Medals
Men's baseball
Representing United States
World Baseball Classic
Gold medal – first place	2017 Los Angeles	Team
Pan American Games
Silver medal – second place	2011 Guadalajara	Team

Todd Andrew Smyly (born June 13, 1989) is an American former professional baseball pitcher He played in Major League Baseball (MLB) for the Detroit Tigers, Tampa Bay Rays, Texas Rangers, Philadelphia Phillies, San Francisco Giants, Atlanta Braves, and Chicago Cubs.

Prior to his professional career, Smyly played college baseball at the University of Arkansas. He competed for the United States national baseball team, winning the silver medal in the 2011 Pan American Games. The Tigers drafted Smyly in the second round of the 2010 MLB draft. He made his MLB debut in 2012. Smyly was a part of the 2021 World Series champions with the Braves.

== Early life ==
Smyly was born in Little Rock, Arkansas, to parents Todd and Toni, and grew up in Maumelle, Arkansas. He attended Little Rock Central High School in Little Rock, where he established school records on the baseball team for wins (10) and strikeouts (118) in his junior year.

== College career ==
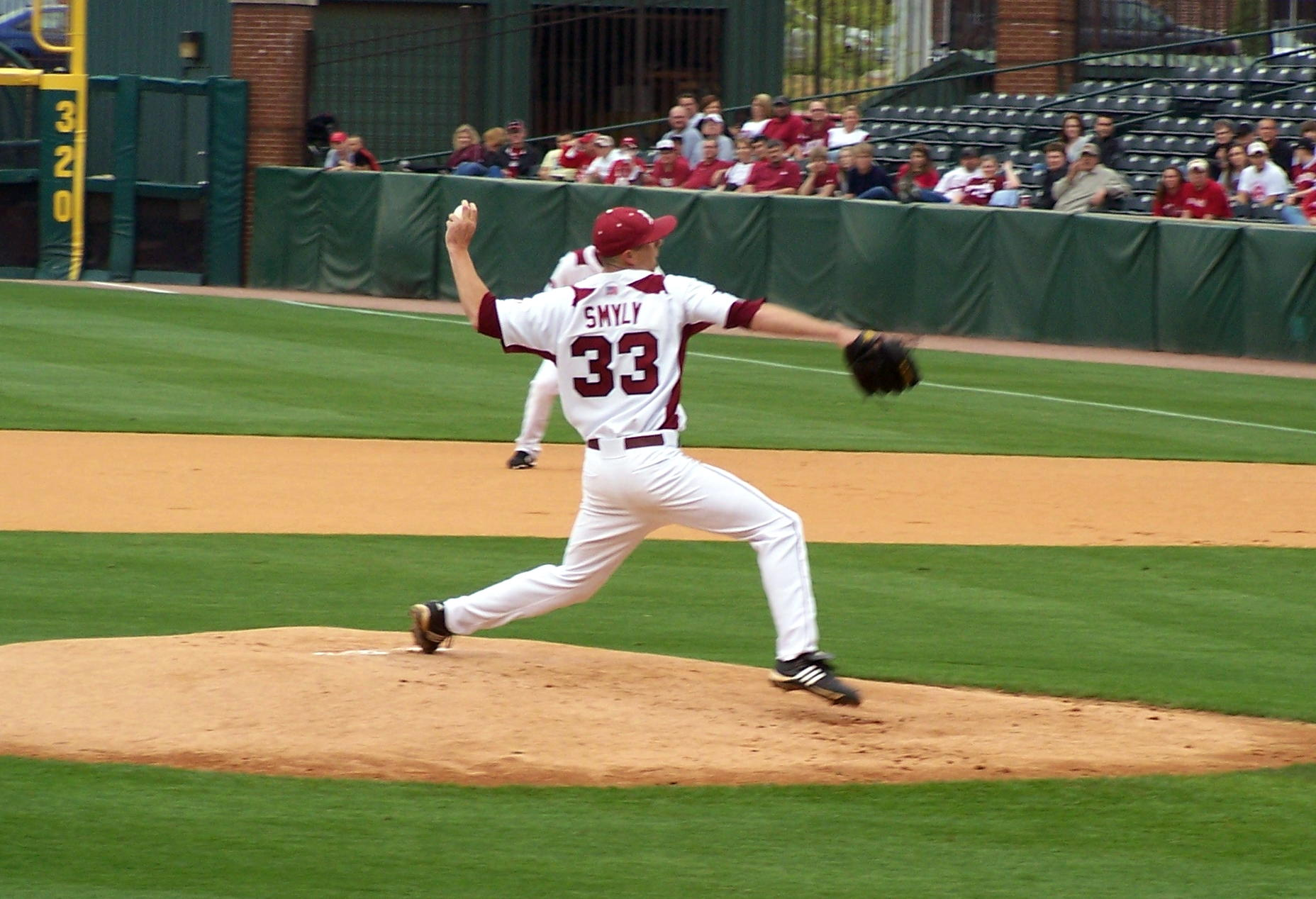
Smyly pitching for the Arkansas Razorbacks

Smyly attended the University of Arkansas, where he played college baseball for the Arkansas Razorbacks baseball team in the Southeastern Conference (SEC) of the National Collegiate Athletic Association (NCAA) Division I. In 2008 he did not play, as he had a fractured left elbow into which two screws were inserted. As a redshirt freshman in 2009, Smyly came within two outs of pitching the first no-hitter at the NCAA Division I championship tournament in 18 years.

During the summer following his 2009 season, Smyly pitched for the Duluth Huskies of the Northwoods League where he played for a brief time under former New York Mets Manager Terry Collins. Serving in the Razorbacks starting rotation in 2010, Smyly had a 9–1 win–loss record with a 2.80 earned run average (ERA) and 114 strikeouts in 103 innings pitched, and was named All-SEC.

== Professional career ==
=== Detroit Tigers ===
The Detroit Tigers drafted Smyly in the second round (68th overall) of the 2010 MLB draft. He signed with the Tigers, receiving a $1.1 million signing bonus. Pitching for the Lakeland Tigers of the High-A Florida State League and the Erie SeaWolves of the Double-A Eastern League, Smyly was named the Tigers Minor League Pitcher of the Year in 2011, pitching to an 11–6 win–loss record in 22 games (21 starts) with a 2.07 earned run average (ERA) and 130 strikeouts in 126 innings pitched. He was also FSL Pitcher of the Week on June 13, and an MiLB.com Tigers Organization All-Star.

==== 2012 ====
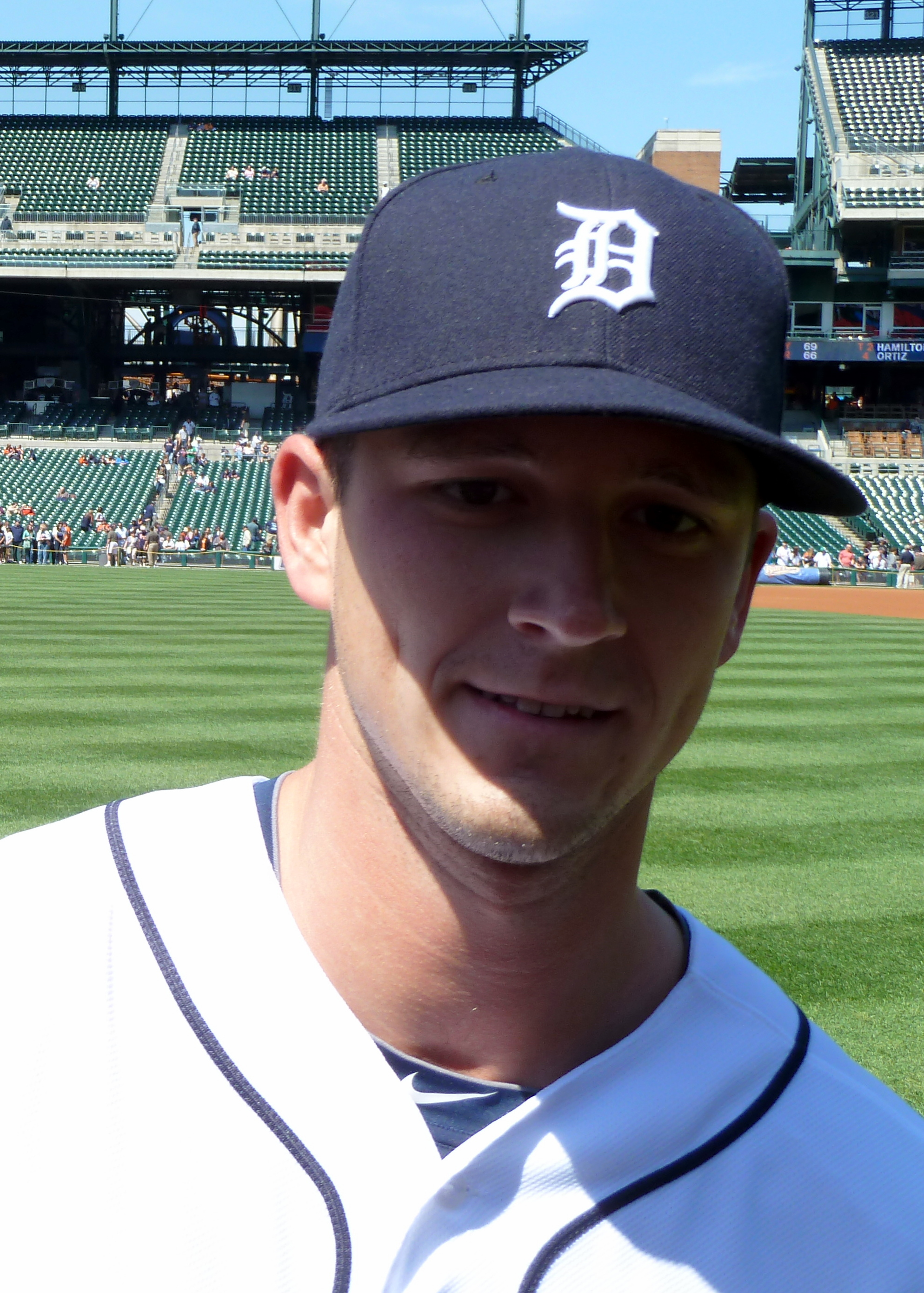
Smyly with the Detroit Tigers in 2012

Heading into the 2012 season, MLB.com ranked Smyly the 82nd-best prospect in baseball, while Baseball America ranked him the third-best prospect in the Tigers organization, behind Jacob Turner and Nick Castellanos. The Tigers invited Smyly to spring training in 2012, allowing him to compete for a spot in the Tigers starting rotation. Smyly won the competition, beginning the 2012 season in the starting rotation of the Detroit Tigers, though he made one start with the Toledo Mud Hens of the Triple-A International League on April 7 prior to being called up for his MLB debut on April 12. On June 14, he was placed on the disabled list (retroactive to June 11) due to a blister on his left hand. Following the Tigers' trade deadline acquisition of starter Aníbal Sánchez from the Miami Marlins, Smyly spent much of August and September coming out of the Tigers' bullpen.

On the season, Smyly pitched 99 1/3 innings, compiling a 4–3 record with 94 strikeouts, 33 walks, and a 3.99 ERA. He was named to the Tigers postseason roster.

Smyly was the winning pitcher in Game 1 of the 2012 ALCS against the New York Yankees, pitching the final two innings of the Tigers’ extra-innings win.

==== 2013 ====
Smyly competed with Rick Porcello in spring training for the fifth spot in the Tigers' 2013 starting rotation. On March 26, it was announced that Porcello had won the No. 5 starter job, and that Smyly would start the season in the Tiger bullpen. On April 5, Smyly got his first career save after pitching four perfect innings of relief in an 8–3 win over the Yankees. In his first full season as a reliever, Smyly posted a 6–0 record with two saves in 63 games with a 2.37 ERA. He led all Tigers relievers and all AL lefty relievers in innings pitched (76) and strikeouts (81).

==== 2014 ====
With the departure of Tigers starter Doug Fister via trade, Smyly was named the No. 5 starter in the Tigers rotation for the 2014 season. Because of off days, he pitched six innings out of the bullpen before making his season debut as a starter on April 18. Smyly pitched seven shutout innings to earn the win in a May 3 game against the Kansas City Royals. This marked his first win as a starter since July 6, 2012, which also came against Kansas City. On July 25, in a game against the Los Angeles Angels of Anaheim, Smyly matched his season high in strikeouts (8) after just three innings, and finished the game with a career-high 11 strikeouts in 5 2/3 innings.

=== Tampa Bay Rays ===
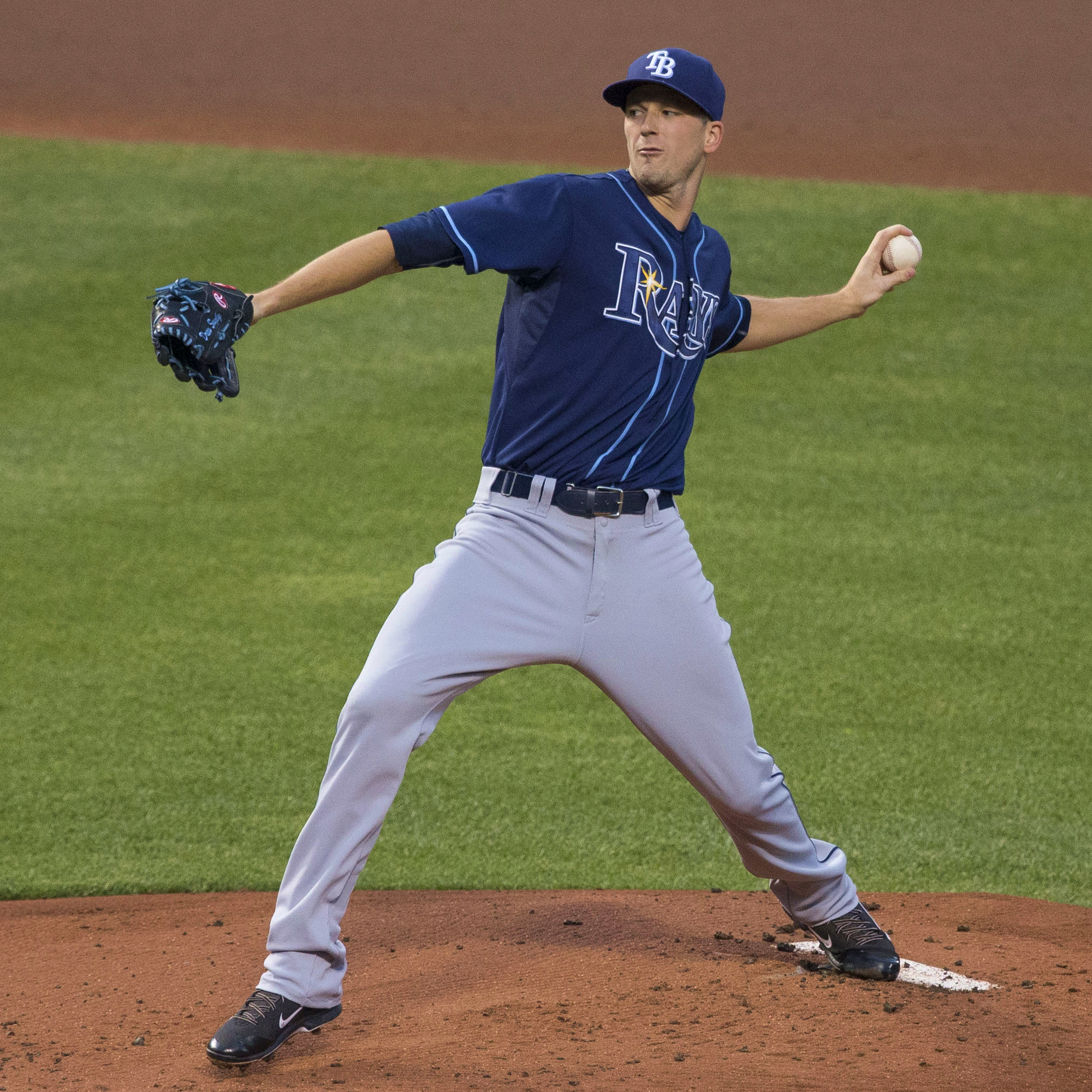
Smyly with the Tampa Bay Rays in 2015

On July 31, 2014, the Detroit Tigers traded Smyly to the Tampa Bay Rays, along with Willy Adames, in a three-team deal that also sent Austin Jackson to the Seattle Mariners, Nick Franklin from the Mariners to the Rays, and David Price to the Tigers. On September 9, Rays' manager Joe Maddon announced they would shut down Smyly for the remainder of the season, after he had pitched a career-high 153 innings. After being traded to the Rays, Smyly went 3–1 with a 1.70 ERA in seven starts. Opponents hit .155 against him, a figure that led the AL over that span. For the 2014 season he was 9–10 with a 3.24 ERA in 28 games, 25 of which were starts.

In 2015 he was 5–2 with a 3.11 ERA in 12 starts, as he struck out 77 batters in 66 2/3 innings.

On February 4, 2016, Smyly won his arbitration case against the Rays. He earned $3.75 million in 2016. In 2016 he was 7–12 with a 4.88 ERA in 30 starts in which he pitched 175 1/3 innings. The 32 home runs he gave up were fifth-most in the American League.

=== Seattle Mariners ===
On January 11, 2017, the Rays traded Smyly to the Seattle Mariners in exchange for Mallex Smith, Ryan Yarbrough, and Carlos Vargas. Smyly began the season on the disabled list. On June 28, the team announced Smyly would need Tommy John surgery for a torn left elbow ulnar collateral ligament, which he had the following month, ending his season with Seattle without him having started a game. On December 1, Smyly was non-tendered by the Mariners, making him a free agent.

=== Chicago Cubs ===
On December 12, 2017, Smyly signed a two-year, $10 million deal with the Chicago Cubs. During the 2018 season, after recovering from his surgery Smyly made a single appearance in the minor leagues, pitching one inning for the Class A South Bend Cubs, striking out three.

=== Texas Rangers ===
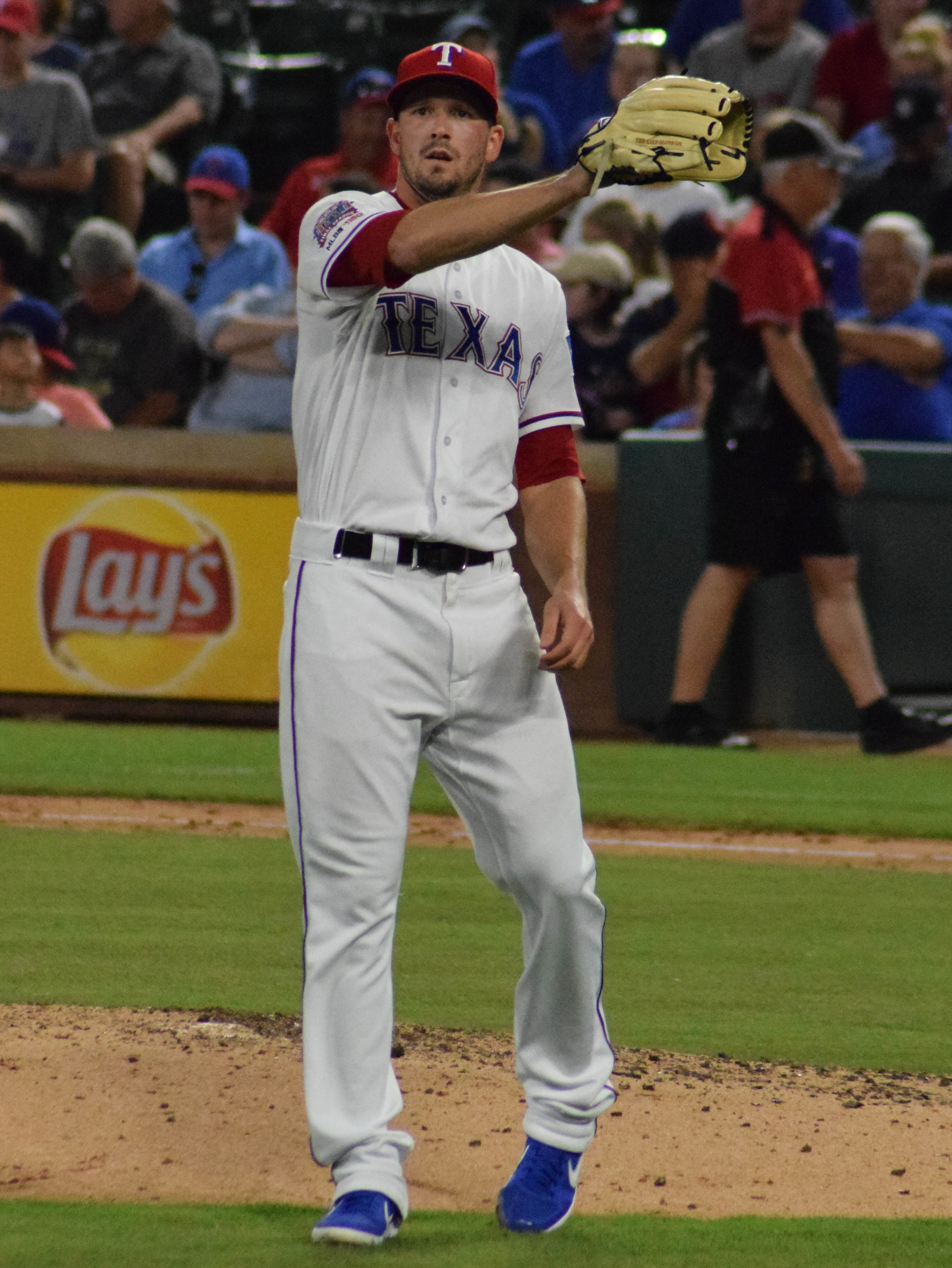
Smyly with the Texas Rangers in 2019

On November 2, 2018, the Cubs traded Smyly and a player to be named later to the Texas Rangers in exchange for a player to be named later. He was placed on the disabled list on April 20 with a left arm injury. On June 20, he was designated for assignment. On June 25, he was released by Texas. For the portion of the 2019 season that he pitched for Texas, he was 1–5 with an 8.42 ERA in 13 games, 9 of which were starts, as he struck out 52 batters in 51 1/3 innings.

=== Milwaukee Brewers ===
On July 1, 2019, Smyly signed a minor league deal with the Milwaukee Brewers. Starting three games for the AAA San Antonio Missions, he was 1–0 with a 4.97 ERA with 18 strikeouts in 12 2/3 innings. He elected free agency on July 18.

=== Philadelphia Phillies ===
On July 21, 2019, Smyly signed a major league contract with the Philadelphia Phillies. With the Phillies he was 3–2 with a 4.45 ERA, as in 12 starts, he pitched 62 2/3 innings and struck out 68 batters; the 32 home runs he gave up for the season between Texas and Philadelphia were the 10th-most in the major leagues.

=== San Francisco Giants ===
On January 16, 2020, Smyly signed a one-year deal with the San Francisco Giants. On the shortened season, Smyly pitched in 7 games (5 starts) with a record of 0–1 in 26 1/3 innings.

=== Atlanta Braves ===
On November 16, 2020, Smyly signed a one-year contract worth $11 million with the Atlanta Braves. In 2021 he was 11–4 with a 4.48 ERA. The Braves finished with an 88–73 record, clinching the NL East, and eventually won the 2021 World Series, giving the Braves their first title since 1995.

=== Chicago Cubs (second stint) ===
On March 19, 2022, Smyly and the Chicago Cubs agreed to a contract worth $4.25 million for the 2022 season. Smyly finished the 2022 season with a 7–8 record and a 3.47 ERA in 22 starts for the Cubs. He became a free agent after the season. On December 24, 2022, Smyly re-signed with the Cubs on a two-year, $19 million contract with an opt-out clause after the 2023 season and a mutual option for the 2025 season.

On April 21, 2023, Smyly was heading towards a perfect game when retired the first 21 batters he faced in a start against the Los Angeles Dodgers, until Smyly collided with catcher Yan Gomes while trying to field a ground ball by David Peralta. He pitched 7 2/3 innings, registering 10 strikeouts. The Cubs declined his 2025 option on November 2, 2024, making him a free agent.

== International career ==
After the 2011 season, Smyly pitched for the United States national baseball team in the 2011 Baseball World Cup and the 2011 Pan American Games, winning the silver medal. Smyly also pitched for Team USA in the 2017 World Baseball Classic.

== Pitching style ==
Smyly throws four pitches. His primary pitch is a four-seam fastball at 91 mph, known for the fact that it explodes on the hitter. He adds a curveball at 77 with little depth, a pitch that he has described as "uniquely bad". He has a cut fastball around 87, which has drawn praise for its late, darting movement into right-handed hitters and away from lefties. Since 2014, he has re-added a changeup in the 83 mph range that he throws almost exclusively to right-handed hitters. He will also mix in a slider (83–85) on occasion.

In 2020, his four-seam averaged nearly 94 mph, at 2249 rpm while his curveball also increased to 80 mph average at 2153 rpm compared to 1950 rpm in 2019. The improvements were due to his longer arm swing, higher glove position off the raised front thigh at windup, and a faster arm speed at release, but also having well-recovered from Tommy John surgery.

== Personal ==
Smyly and his wife, Eryn, had a daughter in 2017. They reside in Scottsdale, Arizona.

== See also ==
- List of baseball players who underwent Tommy John surgery
