= Brayan Villarreal =

Venezuelan baseball player (born 1987)

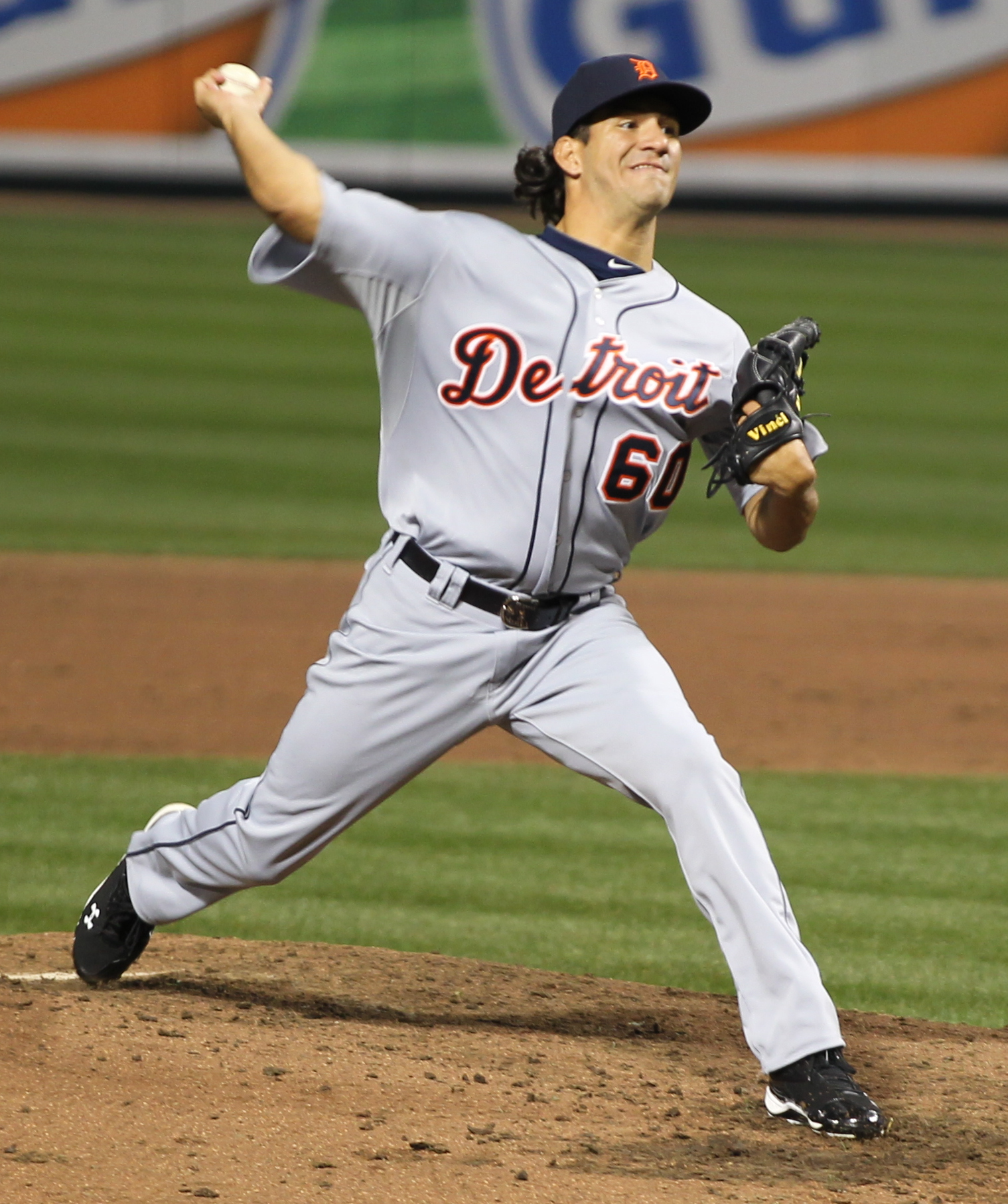
- Villarreal with the Detroit Tigers
- Pitcher
- Born: May 10, 1987 (age 39); La Guaira, Venezuela
- Batted: Right Threw: Right

MLB debut
- April 2, 2011, for the Detroit Tigers

Last MLB appearance
- August 20, 2013, for the Boston Red Sox

MLB statistics
- Win–loss record: 4–8
- Earned run average: 4.56
- Strikeouts: 86
- Stats at Baseball Reference

Teams
- Detroit Tigers (2011–2013); Boston Red Sox (2013)

Brayan Rene Villarreal (born May 10, 1987) is a Venezuelan former professional baseball pitcher. He played in Major League Baseball (MLB) for the Detroit Tigers and Boston Red Sox. He is 6'0" tall and weighs 170 pounds.

== Career ==
=== Detroit Tigers ===
==== Minor leagues ====
Villarreal signed with the Detroit Tigers and began his professional career in 2006, pitching for the VSL Marlins/Tigers and going 0–2 with a 3.48 ERA in 14 games (five starts). He moved to the United States in 2007, though he pitched in only one game that season—for the GCL Tigers, with whom he went 0–0 with a 6.23 ERA. In 2008, he pitched for both the GCL Tigers (11 games, six starts) and West Michigan Whitecaps (one start), going a combined 1–6 with a 4.69 ERA. In 2009, he pitched for the Whitecaps again, going 5–5 with a 2.87 ERA in 26 games (16 starts), striking out 118 batters in 103 1/3 innings of work. He split 2010 between the Lakeland Flying Tigers and Erie SeaWolves, going a combined 7–8 with a 3.55 ERA in 24 starts. He struck out 136 batters in 129 1/3 innings pitched.

Villarreal was ranked among the top 20 Tigers prospects by Baseball America following the 2009, 2010, and 2011 seasons.

==== Major leagues ====
Villarreal made the Tigers out of spring training in 2011, bypassing the Triple-A level. He made his major league debut on April 2 against the New York Yankees.

On April 12, 2011, Villarreal achieved a rare feat. Entering the game with a man on first and two outs, he picked off the runner immediately. With that, Villarreal recorded a hold without throwing a single pitch.

He spent 16 games at the major league level in 2011, going 1–1 with a 6.75 ERA. In 16 innings, he allowed 21 hits and 10 walks, while striking out 14 batters. He spent much of the season in the minor leagues, going 3–5 with a 5.05 ERA in 17 games (10 starts) for Triple-A Toledo.

On April 8, 2012, Villarreal was called up from Triple-A Toledo after Doug Fister went on the disabled list with an injured side. Villarreal had pitched in one game with Toledo. In 54 2/3 innings pitched, Villareal notched a 3–5 record with 2.63 ERA, 66 strikeouts, and nine holds. However, he was not selected to the Tigers' playoff roster that won the American League pennant. In the minors, he had a 1.29 ERA in eight relief appearances that year.

=== Boston Red Sox ===
On July 30, 2013, Villarreal was traded to the Boston Red Sox along with Jake Peavy in a three-team trade that sent Avisail García and Frankie Montas to the Chicago White Sox and José Iglesias to the Detroit Tigers. He was designated for assignment by the Red Sox on January 22, 2014.

Though Villarreal threw only four pitches for the Red Sox in 2013 (a walk-off bases-loaded walk against the San Francisco Giants at AT&T Park), his lone appearance still qualified him for a 2013 World Series ring, which he received during the championship ring ceremony at Fenway Park in April 2014. He became a free agent following the 2014 season.

On December 11, 2014, Villarreal signed a split minor league contract with the Minnesota Twins. However, he never appeared in a game for the organization.

=== Staten Island FerryHawks ===
On July 18, 2024, after nine years of inactivity, Villarreal signed with the Staten Island FerryHawks of the Atlantic League of Professional Baseball. In 4 games for Staten Island, he struggled to a 16.20 ERA with 3 strikeouts across 3 1/3 innings pitched. On August 9, Villarreal was released by the FerryHawks.

== Repertoire ==
Villarreal throws three pitches: a four-seam and two-seam fastball that tops out at about 100 mph, and a slider in the upper 80s. Villarreal likes to get ahead of hitters with his fastballs and then use his slider to put them away.

== Personal life ==
In March 2013, Villarreal's family home in Venezuela was attacked by three armed robbers who threatened to kidnap his relatives in the future. Police were alerted to suspicious circumstances by a neighbor. The robbers had assaulted Villarreal's father and threatened to kill his mother and younger brother if they made any noise when officers arrived. Villarreal married Julianna Strout in 2022, Former Miss America Contestant.

== See also ==
- List of Major League Baseball players from Venezuela
