= Avisaíl García =

Venezuelan baseball player (born 1991)

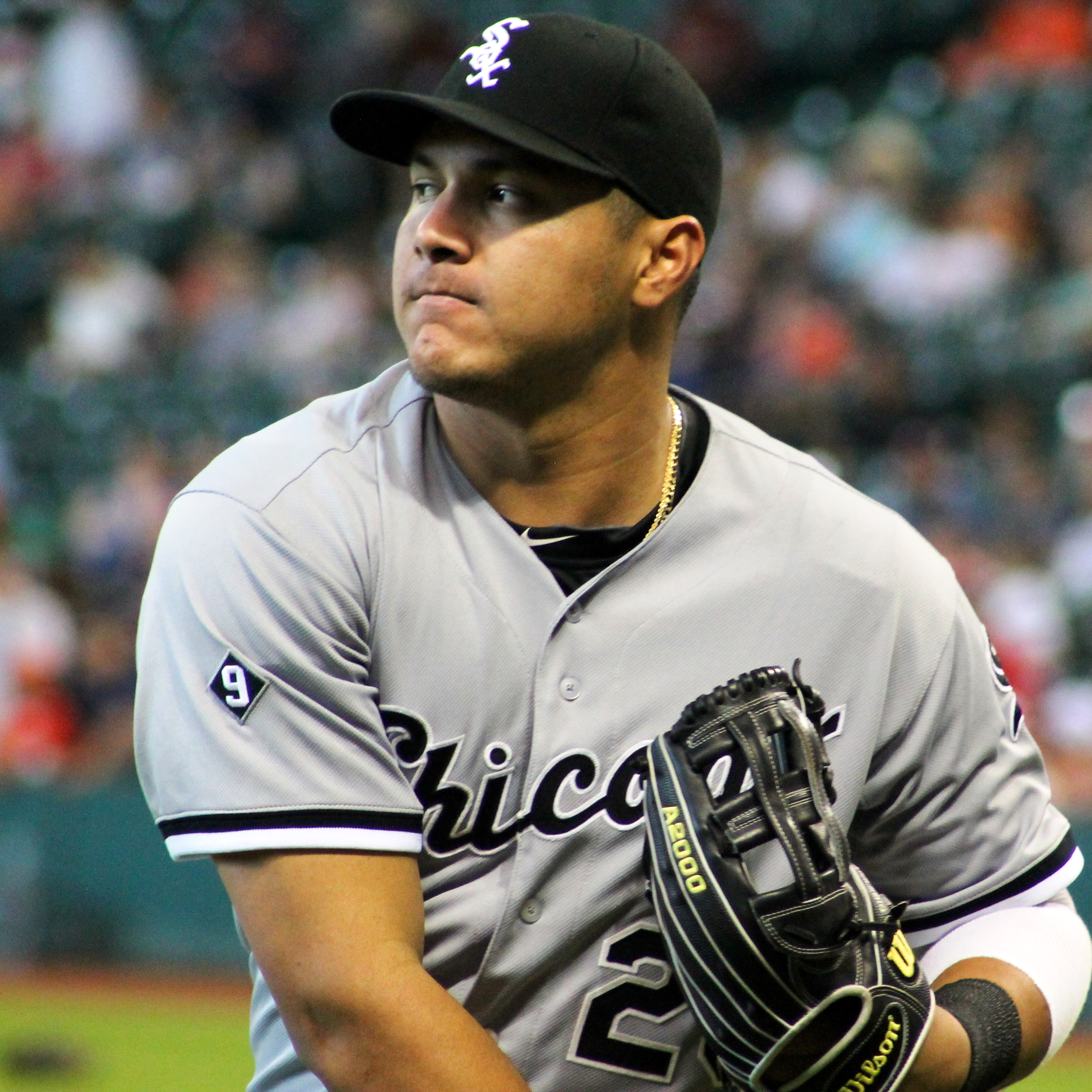
- García with the Chicago White Sox in 2015
- Right fielder
- Born: June 12, 1991 (age 35); Anzoátegui, Venezuela
- Batted: Right Threw: Right

MLB debut
- August 31, 2012, for the Detroit Tigers

Last MLB appearance
- April 27, 2024, for the Miami Marlins

MLB statistics
- Batting average: .263
- Home runs: 140
- Runs batted in: 524
- Stats at Baseball Reference

Teams
- Detroit Tigers (2012–2013); Chicago White Sox (2013–2018); Tampa Bay Rays (2019); Milwaukee Brewers (2020–2021); Miami Marlins (2022–2024)

Career highlights and awards
- All-Star (2017)

Avisaíl Antonio García Yaguarin (Spanish pronunciation: [aβisa'il]; born June 12, 1991) is a Venezuelan former professional baseball right fielder. He played in Major League Baseball (MLB) for the Detroit Tigers, Chicago White Sox, Tampa Bay Rays, Milwaukee Brewers, and Miami Marlins. He signed with the Tigers as a non-drafted free agent in 2007 and made his major league debut in 2012.

== Professional career ==
=== Detroit Tigers ===
==== 2011–2012 ====
García was invited to spring training with the Detroit Tigers in 2011 and 2012, after signing with them as a non-drafted free agent in 2007. After the 2011 season, he was added to the Tigers 40-man roster. He was named 2012 Minor League Player of the Year for the Tigers farm system, and first appeared on the major-league team on August 31, 2012. He hit .319 in 23 games, and made the playoff roster, appearing in the League Division Series, League Championship Series and 2012 World Series. In 23 postseason at-bats, García hit .261 with a double and four RBIs.

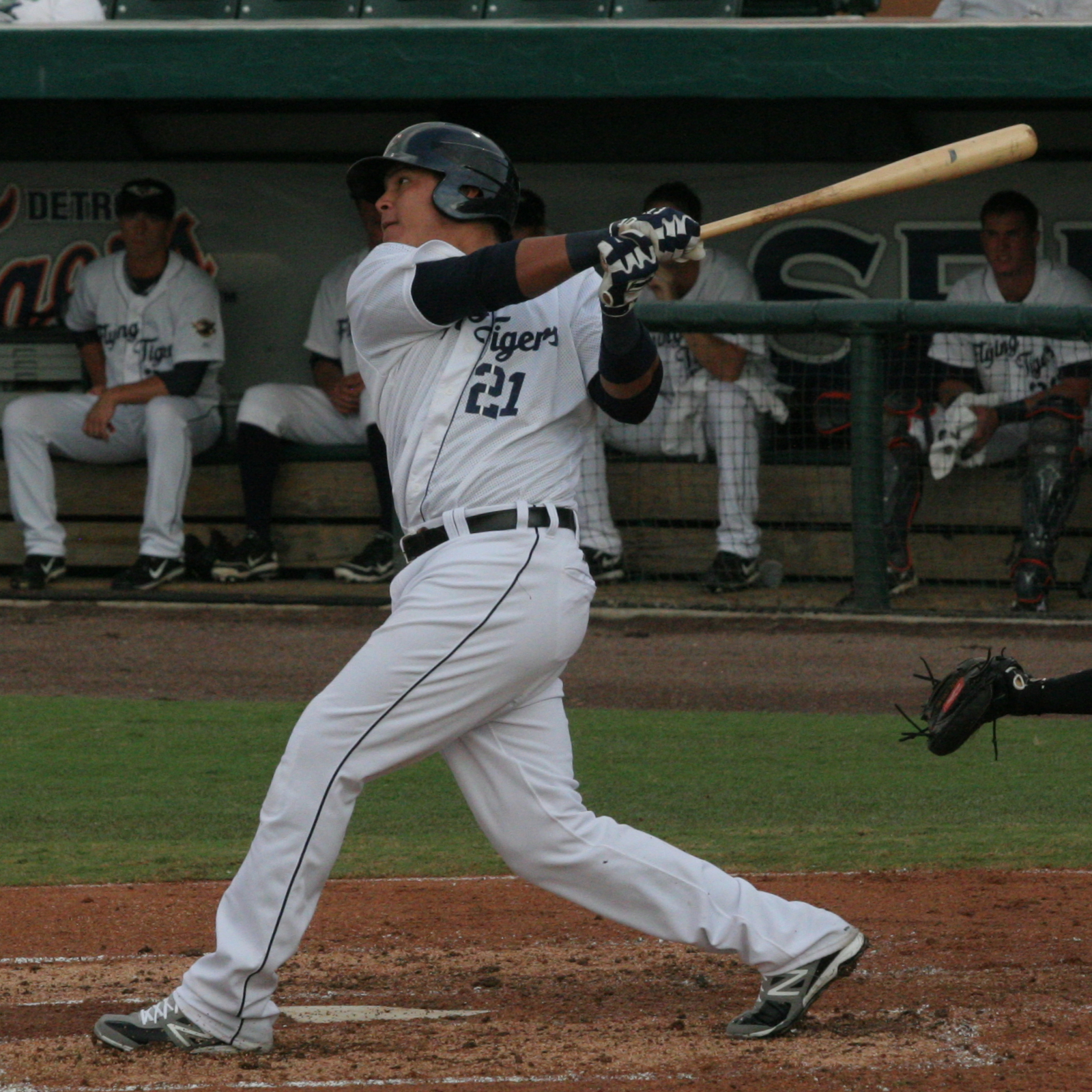
García batting for the Lakeland Flying Tigers in 2012

He is noted for his resemblance to former teammate Miguel Cabrera, earning him the nickname "Little Miggy". Both stand 6 feet 4 inches (1.9 m) tall, weigh 240 pounds (110 kg), bat right-handed, and hail from Venezuela.

==== 2013 ====
García entered the 2013 season with an outside shot to make the Tigers' opening day roster, but that possibility ended when he was placed on the 15-day disabled list (DL) March 26 (retroactive to March 22) with a heel contusion. He was brought up to the Tigers in May when Austin Jackson was placed on the DL. On May 15, Garcia hit his first major league home run.

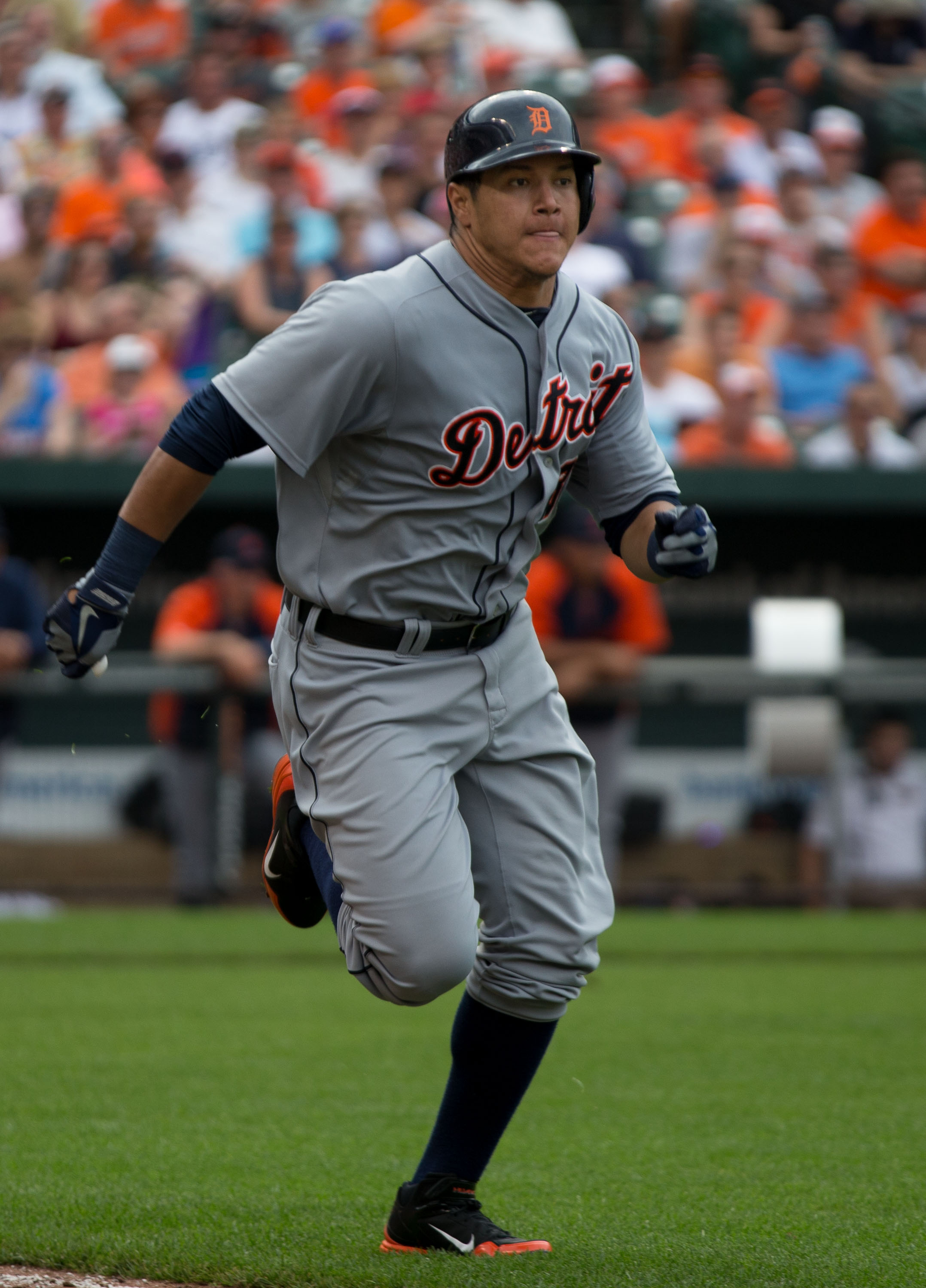
García with the Detroit Tigers in 2013

In June, García was optioned to the Triple-A Toledo Mud Hens when Jackson came off the DL, but was recalled four days later when Aníbal Sánchez was placed on the DL. On July 7, 2013, during a game for the Triple-A Toledo Mud Hens, García hit for the cycle in a 9–7 victory over the Indianapolis Indians. This marked the first cycle for a Mud Hen since Ryan Raburn on May 27, 2007. In 2013 with the Tigers he batted .241/.273/.373.

=== Chicago White Sox ===
==== 2013–2014 ====
On July 30, 2013, García was traded to the Chicago White Sox in a three-team trade that sent Jake Peavy and Brayan Villarreal to the Boston Red Sox, José Iglesias to the Detroit Tigers, and Frankie Montas to the White Sox. García initially reported to the White Sox Triple-A affiliate, the Charlotte Knights. Between Charlotte and Toledo, he led the International League in batting average with a .374 mark. When the White Sox traded Alex Ríos on August 9, they promoted García to the major leagues. He started his first game with the White Sox on August 10, and collected his first hit with the team in the sixth inning.

García came out of a game against the Colorado Rockies on April 9, 2014, after he jammed his left shoulder after attempting a diving catch in right field. The next day, an MRI revealed that his left shoulder had a torn labrum. He was then placed on the 60-day disabled list. Despite projections that he would be out for the season, García recovered incredibly quick and was activated from the DL on August 16, 2013. Limited to only 46 games in 2014, García batted .244/.305/.413 with seven home runs and 29 RBIs.

==== 2015–2018 ====
In 148 games in 2015, García hit .257/.309/.365 with 13 home runs and 59 RBIs. García played in only 120 games in 2016 due to injury, hitting .245/.307/.385 with 12 home runs and 51 RBIs. On December 3, García and the White Sox avoided salary arbitration by agreeing to a one-year, $3 million contract for the 2017 season.

In 2017, García set career highs in average (.330), runs (75), home runs (18) and RBIs (80). Garcia was named to his first-ever all star game. For the season, he had the highest batting average on balls in play (.392) of all major league players, and swung at 59.0% of all pitches he saw, tops in the major leagues. He also led all MLB hitters (60 or more plate appearances) in batting average against left-handers, at .424.

García was placed on the disabled list for the second time in the season on July 10 with a hamstring injury, limiting him to just 35 games played in the first half of the season. For the season he batted .236/.281/.438 with 19 home runs.

=== Tampa Bay Rays ===
On January 18, 2019, García signed a one-year, $6 million deal with the Tampa Bay Rays. Garcia delivered solid numbers while in Tampa Bay, posting a .282 average, .a 332 on-base percentage, and a .464 slugging percentage. He became a free agent after the season.

=== Milwaukee Brewers ===
On December 17, 2019, García signed a two-year contract worth $20 million with the Milwaukee Brewers. García's contract contains a club option for a third season at $12 million, attached to a $2 million buyout. This contract option became a mutual option when he accumulated 1,050 plate appearances in 2020–21. Per the agreement between the Major League Baseball Players Association and Major League Baseball, vesting options dependent on accumulated stats for 2020 were prorated for the number of games played (60). After the 2021 season he declined his half of the option and became a free agent.

=== Miami Marlins ===
On December 1, 2021, García signed a four-year, $53 million contract with the Miami Marlins. He played in 98 games for the Marlins in 2022, hitting .224/.266/.317 with eight home runs and 35 RBI.

2023 was an injury–riddled season for García, as he appeared in only 37 games and hit .185/.241/.315 with three home runs and 12 RBI.

In 2024, García hit .240 in 18 games before suffering an injury. On June 4, 2024, García was designated for assignment by Miami. He was released by the organization on June 9.

On October 24, 2024, García underwent surgery to treat a fracture and disc issue in his lower back. On February 6, 2025, it was announced that García would likely miss the entire 2025 season due to the injury. On February 2, 2026, García announced his retirement from professional baseball.

== See also ==
- List of Major League Baseball players from Venezuela
