= Casey Crosby =

American baseball player (born 1988)

Kane County Cougars – No. 36
- Pitcher
- Born: September 17, 1988 (age 37); Kankakee, Illinois, U.S.
- Bats: Right Throws: Left

MLB debut
- June 1, 2012, for the Detroit Tigers

MLB statistics (through 2012 season)
- Win–loss record: 1–1
- Earned run average: 9.49
- Strikeouts: 9
- Stats at Baseball Reference

Teams
- Detroit Tigers (2012)

Casey W. Crosby (born September 17, 1988) is an American professional baseball pitcher for the Kane County Cougars of the American Association of Professional Baseball. He has previously played in Major League Baseball (MLB) for the Detroit Tigers.

== Professional career ==
=== Detroit Tigers ===
Crosby was drafted by the Detroit Tigers in the fifth round, with the 181st overall selection, of the 2007 Major League Baseball draft out of Kaneland High School. A subsequent Tommy John surgery ruled Crosby out for the entirety of the season, as well as most of the following season. He made his professional debut in 2008 with the rookie-level Gulf Coast League Tigers, logging three scoreless starts. Crosby spent the 2009 campaign with the Single-A West Michigan Whitecaps, compiling a 10-4 record and 2.41 ERA with 117 strikeouts in 104 2/3 innings pitched across 24 starts.

Prior to the 2010 season, Crosby was considered the 47th best prospect in baseball by Baseball America. He made only three starts for the GCL Tigers, struggling to an 0-1 record and 8.76 ERA with 10 strikeouts over 12 1/3 innings. Crosby's season was truncated largely due to lingering elbow issues. He spent the 2011 season with the Double-A Erie SeaWolves, where he registered a 9-7 record and 4.10 ERA with 121 strikeouts across 131 2/3 innings pitched. On November 18, 2011, the Tigers added Crosby to their 40-man roster to protect him from the Rule 5 draft. Despite suffering two elbow injuries, Crosby pitched for the Toledo Mud Hens, the Tigers' Triple-A affiliate.

On June 1, 2012, Crosby was promoted to the major leagues for the first time following an injury to Doug Fister. Crosby made his debut the same day against the New York Yankees, and recorded his first career strikeout against former Tigers player Curtis Granderson. In the second inning, Crosby issued four walks followed by a grand slam by Granderson. He pitched 3 1/3 innings and earned his first career loss. On June 7, Crosby gained his first major league win after giving up three runs in 5 1/3 innings, as the Tigers defeated the Cleveland Indians 7–5. He made three starts during his rookie campaign, logging a 1-0 record and 9.49 ERA with nine strikeouts across 12 1/3 innings pitched. Crosby was optioned to Triple-A Toledo to begin the 2013 season, where he ultimately spent the entire year. In 13 starts, he posted a 2-5 record and 4.84 ERA with 61 strikeouts across 57 2/3 innings pitched.

In part due to his lengthy injury history and struggles in the major leagues, Crosby was converted into a relief pitcher for the 2014 season. He was optioned to Triple-A Toledo to begin the year. In 11 appearances for the Mud Hens, Crosby recorded a 5.71 ERA with 12 strikeouts across 17 1/3 innings pitched. On August 11, 2014, Crosby was released by the Tigers to clear roster space for Kevin Whelan following a 19 inning game against the Toronto Blue Jays. Crosby was on the Toledo disabled list with a season-ending injury at the time of his release. On August 24, Crosby re-signed with Detroit on a minor league contract; he became a free agent following the season.

On December 23, 2014, Crosby signed a minor league contract with the Boston Red Sox organization. He was released prior to the start of the season on April 4, 2015.

=== Lincoln Saltdogs ===
On August 7, 2017, Crosby signed with the Lincoln Saltdogs of the American Association of Independent Professional Baseball. In 16 appearances for Lincoln, Crosby recorded a 2.16 ERA with 17 strikeouts across 16 2/3 innings pitched.

=== Minnesota Twins ===
After not playing in affiliated baseball for three seasons, on October 13, 2017, Crosby signed a minor league contract with the Minnesota Twins organization. He split the season between the rookie–level Gulf Coast League Twins, Double–A Chattanooga Lookouts, and Triple–A Rochester Red Wings. In 17 games between the three affiliates, Crosby compiled a 2.95 ERA with 25 strikeouts across 21 1/3 innings pitched. He elected free agency following the season on November 2, 2018.

=== Chicago Dogs ===
On May 14, 2019, Crosby signed with the Chicago Dogs of the American Association of Independent Professional Baseball. He made 36 appearances for the Dogs, posting a 3-1 record and 1.99 ERA with 64 strikeouts across 40 2/3 innings pitched.

=== Lancaster Barnstormers ===
On September 4, 2019, Crosby was traded to the Lancaster Barnstormers of the Atlantic League of Professional Baseball. He made six scoreless appearances for Lancaster, recording 11 strikeouts and one save over six innings of work.

=== Los Angeles Dodgers ===
On October 23, 2019, Crosby was traded back to the Chicago Dogs of the American Association.

On December 5, 2019, Crosby signed a minor league contract with the Los Angeles Dodgers after his video surfaced on Rob Friedman's FlatGroundApp Twitter account. He did not play in a game in 2020 due to the cancellation of the minor league season because of the COVID-19 pandemic. Crosby was released by the Dodgers organization on July 1, 2020.

=== Chicago Dogs (second stint) ===
On July 3, 2020, Crosby signed with the Chicago Dogs of the American Association of Independent Professional Baseball, his second stint with the club. In 24 appearances for Chicago, he struggled to an 0-1 record and 8.37 ERA with 32 strikeouts across 23 2/3 innings pitched. On November 2, Crosby was released by the Dogs.

=== Kane County Cougars ===
On May 29, 2025, after four years of inactivity, Crosby signed with the Kane County Cougars of the American Association of Professional Baseball. In 34 appearances for Kane County, Crosby posted a 3.07 ERA with 55 strikeouts over 41 innings of work, helping the Cougars win their second consecutive league championship.

On July 11, 2026, Crosby re–signed with the Cougars.
