= Darin Downs =

American baseball player (born 1984)

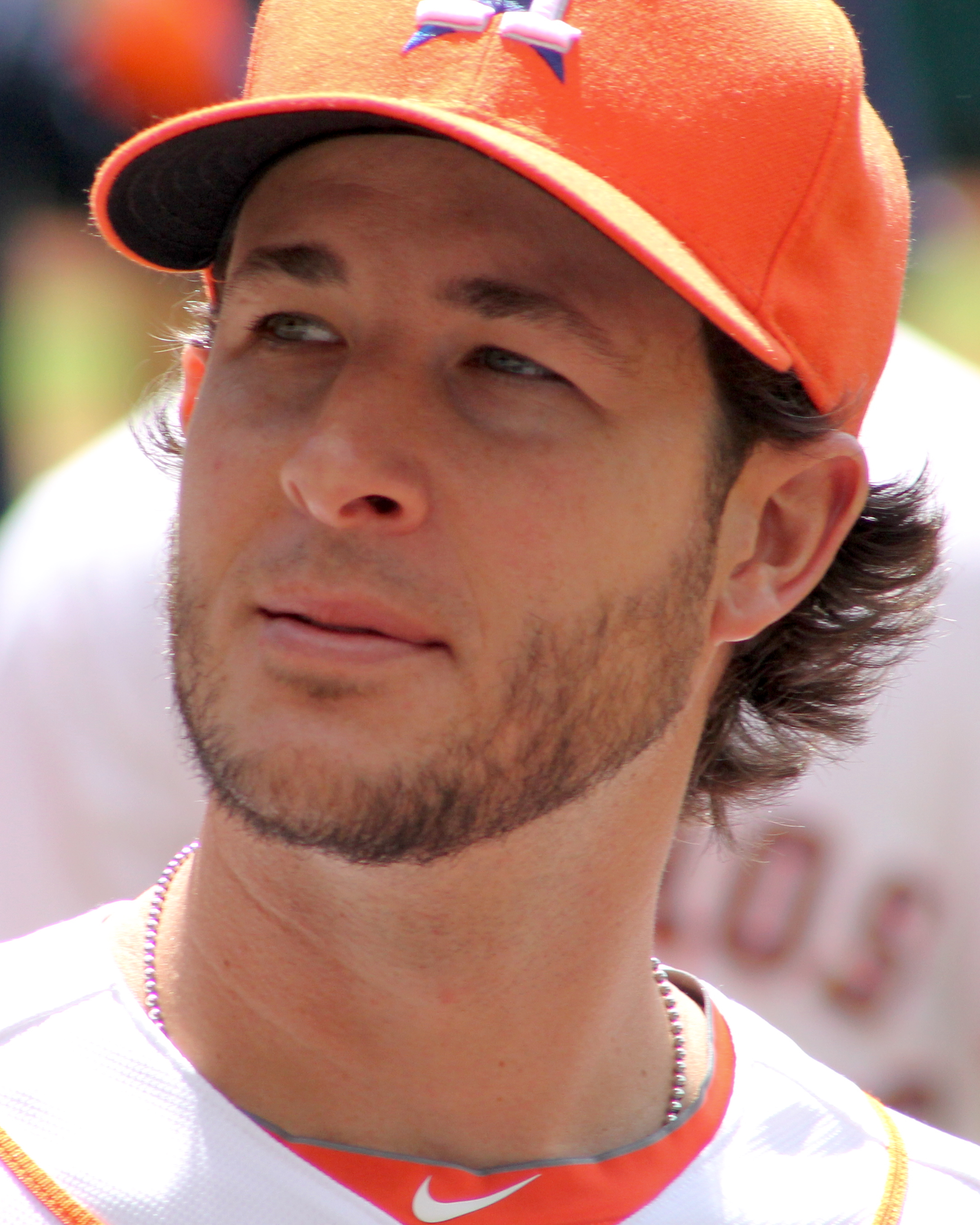
- Downs with the Houston Astros
- Starting pitcher
- Born: December 26, 1984 (age 41); Southfield, Michigan, U.S.
- Batted: Right Threw: Left

Professional debut
- MLB: July 3, 2012, for the Detroit Tigers
- CPBL: August 6, 2016, for the Uni-President 7-Eleven Lions

Last appearance
- MLB: September 19, 2014, for the Houston Astros
- CPBL: May 26, 2018, for the Lamigo Monkeys

MLB statistics
- Win–loss record: 4–4
- Earned run average: 4.76
- Strikeouts: 84

CPBL statistics
- Win–loss record: 14–11
- Earned run average: 4.92
- Strikeouts: 245
- Stats at Baseball Reference

Teams
- Detroit Tigers (2012–2013); Houston Astros (2014); Uni-President 7-Eleven Lions (2016); Lamigo Monkeys (2017–2018)

Career highlights and awards
- Taiwan Series champion (2017)

Darin Burton Downs (born December 26, 1984) is an American former professional baseball pitcher. He played in Major League Baseball (MLB) for the Detroit Tigers and Houston Astros, and in the Chinese Professional Baseball League (CPBL) for the Uni-President 7-Eleven Lions and Lamigo Monkeys.

His professional career began when he was drafted by the Chicago Cubs in 2003. He also played in the Tampa Bay Rays' minor league system and during that time, survived a very serious concussion. After spending the 2011 season in the minors for the Florida Marlins organization, Downs joined the Tigers. He was called up to the majors for the first time on July 3, 2012. Downs was claimed off waivers by the Houston Astros after the 2013 season.

== Playing career ==
=== Chicago Cubs ===
Downs was a fifth-round draft choice of the Chicago Cubs in June 2003. As a member of the Arizona League Cubs, Downs appeared in a total of 13 games during the 2003 minor league season, making 11 starts. He posted an earned run average (ERA) of 6.57 and had an 0–2 record.

For the 2004 season, Downs played for another Cubs minor league affiliate, the Boise Hawks. He pitched in 14 games, all but one as a starter. His ERA (4.95) was better than that of the previous year, as was his record of 5–3. Also, he struck out 61 opponents, the most by any Boise pitcher that season.

Downs remained with Boise for most of 2005 and for the second consecutive season, he appeared in 14 games for the team and started 13 of them. With Boise, his ERA dropped again, this time to 3.50, and his win–loss record was 5–4. During his time with the Hawks, Downs also struck out 63 opponents. However, he actually began the year with the Peoria Chiefs, where he started and lost two games, posting a bloated ERA of 18.47.

In 2006, Downs was again on the Boise roster, but an injury to his right oblique kept him out of the action for part of July. On the whole, Downs appeared in nine games for the Hawks, but made only two starts. His ERA was 4.81 and he posted a 4–2 mark. Downs briefly returned to the Arizona League Cubs in August, seeing action in a couple of contests, but soon rejoining Boise.

Downs spent 2007 with the Daytona Cubs, setting a new career high with 34 appearances, but serving as the starting pitcher only twice. For the entire season, he was 3–7 with an ERA of 4.11, but for the month of May, his ERA was only 1.54 and it was 2.00 in August. Downs also got his first professional saves in 2007.

=== Tampa Bay Rays ===
Downs played for three separate minor league teams in 2008: Daytona, the Tennessee Smokies and the Vero Beach Devil Rays. He started with Daytona, where he was 2–0 with a 2.89 ERA in 17 relief appearances. Downs then joined Tennessee, where his numbers, 0–2 with a 6.56 ERA in 22 games, were much worse. His time as a Cubs minor league player came to an end in July when he was shipped to the Tampa Bay Rays, who assigned him to Vero Beach. He finished the 2008 season there and in 10 games, had an 0–3 record and a 6.00 ERA.

During the 2009 season, Downs played with the Charlotte Stone Crabs (Single A) and the Montgomery Biscuits (Double A). He was a Florida State League All–Star, making both the midseason and postseason rosters. With Charlotte, Downs posted a 2.00 ERA (best in the Florida State League) and a 12–4 record in 20 games (19 starts). In August, he moved to Montgomery, but after starting and losing a pair of contests, Downs suffered a concussion when he was hit in the head by a line drive. After he was taken to the hospital, doctors doubted whether Downs would live. He had to regain the ability to speak, and also had difficulty with post-concussion syndrome.

Downs returned to action in 2010, pitching for Montgomery and the Durham Bulls, Tampa Bay's Triple A team. With Montgomery, Downs posted a 6–2 record and an ERA of 1.69. He was also 6–2 with Durham, but his ERA there jumped to 4.46. Between the two teams, Downs pitched in 41 contests, serving as the starting pitcher four times. In November 2010, Downs reached a deal with the Florida Marlins as a minor league free agent.

=== Florida Marlins ===
The 2011 season was Downs' first and only season with the Marlins and he spent the year with two of Florida's minor league affiliates: the Double-A Jacksonville Suns and Triple-A New Orleans Zephyrs. During his time with the Suns, he compiled a 2–5 record and a 4.83 ERA in 22 games, making 13 starts. On July 19, Downs was moved to New Orleans, where he was 3–2 with a 4.29 ERA as he made 10 appearances, half of them being starts. After the minor league season was over, Downs pitched in the Venezuelan Winter League, making nine starts for Aragua.

=== Detroit Tigers ===
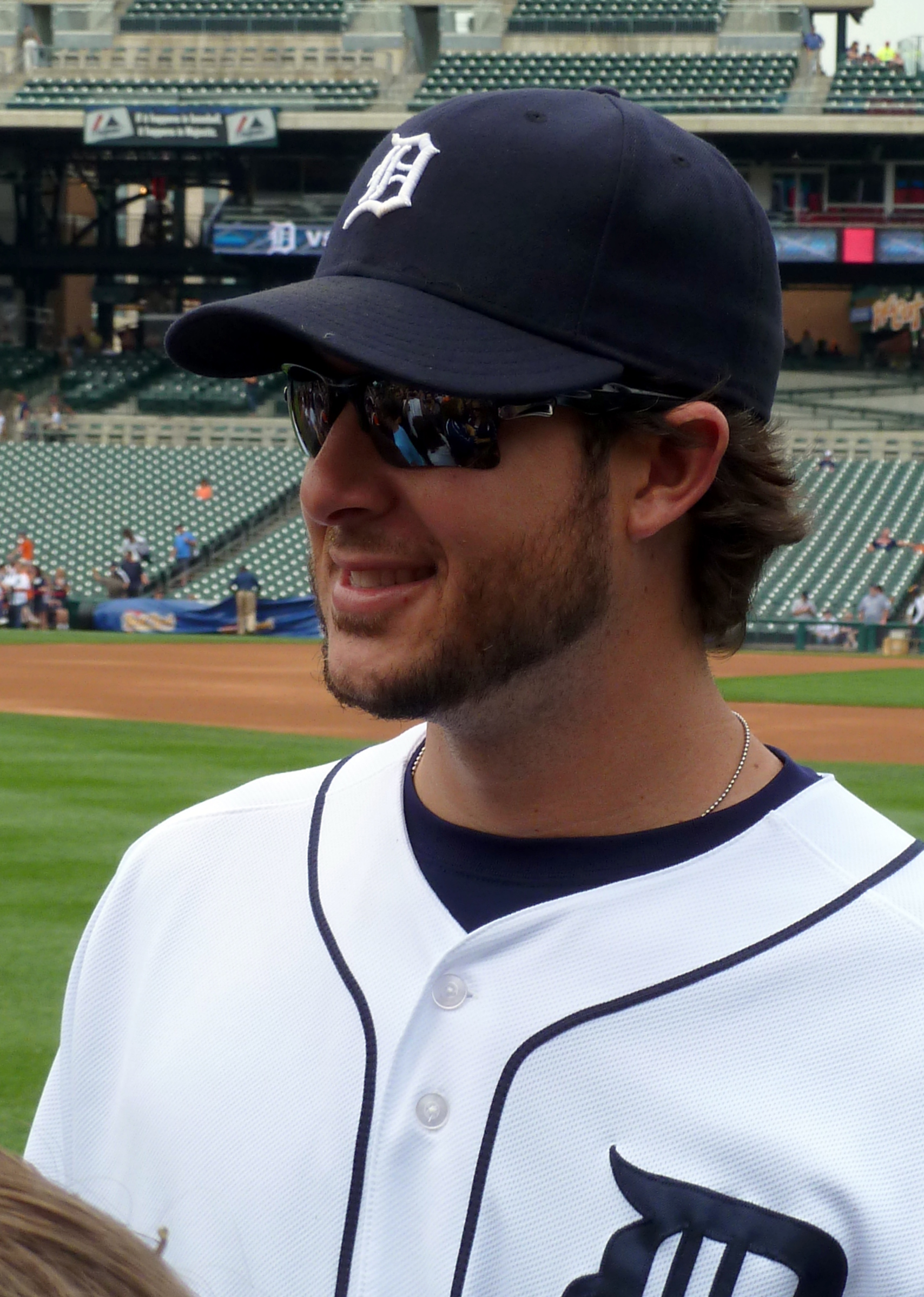
Downs with the Detroit Tigers in 2013

On November 14, 2011, Downs signed a minor league contract with the Detroit Tigers. To start the 2012 season, he was on the roster of the Toledo Mud Hens, Detroit's Triple-A affiliate. After not surrendering a run in ten consecutive games with Toledo, Downs was selected to Detroit's active roster on July 3, 2012. That same day, he made his MLB debut, facing the Minnesota Twins. A couple of days later, he struck out five Twins batters in three innings. On August 5, Downs got his first win as the Tigers defeated the Cleveland Indians 10–8 in 10 innings. For the season, Downs pitched in 18 games for the Tigers. He had a 2–1 record and his ERA was 3.48.

Downs spent majority of the 2013 season in Detroit before going on the 15-day disabled list with rotator cuff tendinitis. He spent two weeks on a rehab assignment before being optioned to Toledo on August 4. After Toledo's season ended, Downs returned home to his family, going into "offseason mode." The Tigers called him up on September 10 where he appeared in the final series against the Miami Marlins.

=== Houston Astros ===
Downs was claimed off waivers by the Houston Astros on November 1, 2013. Downs was placed on the disabled list with an oblique strain on August 19, 2014. At the time, he had a 2–1 record and a 4.31 ERA with 27 strikeouts in 40 appearances with the Astros.

Downs began the 2015 season with the Triple-A Fresno Grizzlies, recording a 4.96 ERA 11 strikeouts and two saves across 16 1/3 innings pitched. Downs was released by the Astros on May 21, 2015.

=== Long Island Ducks ===
On July 13, 2015, Downs signed with the Long Island Ducks of the Atlantic League of Professional Baseball. In 12 starts for the Ducks, he logged a 4-5 record and 3.86 ERA with 55 strikeouts across 67 2/3 innings pitched.

Downs made 17 starts for Long Island in 2016, compiling an 8-5 record and 3.60 ERA with 108 strikeouts over 105 innings of work.

=== Uni-President 7-Eleven Lions ===
On July 28, 2016, Downs signed with the Uni-President 7-Eleven Lions of the Chinese Professional Baseball League following an injury to Jair Jurrjens. He made 10 starts for the Lions, but struggled to an 0-5 record and 6.75 ERA with 51 strikeouts over 52 innings of work.

=== Lamigo Monkeys ===
On February 8, 2017, Downs signed with the Lamigo Monkeys of the Chinese Professional Baseball League. He had a 10–3 record and a 3.49 ERA with 143 strikeouts in 25 appearances during the regular season.

Downs re-signed with the club on January 15, 2018. After surrendering 15 runs over 7 1/3 innings in 2 starts, he was released on May 27.

=== Sultanes de Monterrey ===
On July 25, 2018, Downs signed with the Sultanes de Monterrey of the Mexican League. In 12 appearances (five starts) for Monterrey, he recorded a 3.42 ERA with 28 strikeouts and one save across 26 1/3 innings pitched. Downs became a free agent following the season.

=== Long Island Ducks (second stint) ===
On April 2, 2019, Downs signed with the Long Island Ducks of the Atlantic League of Professional Baseball.

=== Acereros de Monclova ===
On June 4, 2019, Downs had his contract purchased by the Acereros de Monclova of the Mexican League. He made two appearances for Monclova, but struggled immensely, allowing six earned runs across 1 1/3 innings. Downs was released by the Acereros on June 10.

=== Long Island Ducks (third stint) ===
On June 14, 2019, Downs signed back with the Long Island Ducks of the Atlantic League of Professional Baseball. He became a free agent following the season.

=== Melbourne Aces ===
On December 25, 2019, the Melbourne Aces of the Australian Baseball League announced the signing of Downs. He went on to record a 0.95 ERA in 19 innings for the Aces in the 2019 season.

=== Long Island Ducks (fourth stint) ===
On June 19, 2021, Downs spent the season as the pitching coach for the Long Island Ducks of the Atlantic League of Professional Baseball. Downs also signed with the team as a player, and recorded a 6–5 record and 4.50 ERA with 93 strikeouts across 19 starts for the club.

== Coaching career ==
On March 4, 2021, Downs was announced as the pitching coach for the Long Island Ducks of the Atlantic League of Professional Baseball for the 2021 season.
