= 2012 Baltimore Orioles season =

Major League Baseball season

2012 Baltimore Orioles
- American League Wild Card winners
- League: American League
- Division: East
- Ballpark: Oriole Park at Camden Yards
- City: Baltimore, Maryland
- Record: 93–69 (.574)
- Divisional place: 2nd
- Owners: Peter Angelos
- President of baseball operations: Dan Duquette
- General managers: Dan Duquette
- Managers: Buck Showalter
- Television: MASN; WJZ-TV (CBS 13) (Gary Thorne, Jim Palmer, Mike Bordick, Jim Hunter)
- Radio: Baltimore Orioles Radio Network (Joe Angel, Fred Manfra)

The Baltimore Orioles' 2012 season was the 112th season in franchise history, the 59th in Baltimore, and the 21st at Oriole Park at Camden Yards. They completed the regular season with a 93–69 record, good for second place in the AL East and qualified for one of two American League wild card spots. It was the first time since 1997 that they finished with a winning record and made the playoffs. They subsequently defeated the Texas Rangers in the inaugural one-game Wild Card Playoff. They advanced to play the New York Yankees in the Division Series, but lost the series to the Yankees in five games. The smiling cartoon bird head returned to the ballclub's caps and helmets after a 23-year absence.

== Offseason ==
=== December ===
- On December 1, 2011, the Orioles traded minor league RHP Randy Henry and a player to be named later to the Texas Rangers for C Taylor Teagarden. On December 8, 2011, the player was identified as minor league 2B Greg Miclat.
- On December 8, 2011, the Orioles traded minor league LHP Jarret Martin and OF Tyler Henson to the Los Angeles Dodgers for LHP Dana Eveland.
- On December 13, 2011, the Orioles signed Tsuyoshi Wada to a two-year contract, with an option for a third year.
- On December 20, 2011, the Orioles signed outfielder Endy Chávez to a one-year contract.

=== January ===
- On January 3, 2012, the Orioles acquired Jai Miller from the Oakland Athletics for cash considerations.
- On January 10, 2012, the Orioles signed Wei-Yin Chen from the Chunichi Dragons to a three-year contract, with an option for a fourth year.
- On January 23, 2012, the Orioles signed infielder Wilson Betemit to a two-year contract, with an option for a third year.

=== February ===
- On February 6, 2012, Jeremy Guthrie was traded to the Colorado Rockies for pitchers Matt Lindstrom and Jason Hammel.
- On February 10, 2012, the Orioles signed RHP Luis Ayala to a one-year contract, with an option for a second year.

=== March ===
- On March 2, 2012, the Orioles signed Miguel González to a minor league contract.

== Regular season ==
On May 6, the Orioles won a marathon 17-inning game over the Boston Red Sox with the pitching win credited to designated hitter Chris Davis. After the Orioles bullpen was exhausted Davis came on to pitch two scoreless innings with two strikeouts, becoming the first American League position player to record a pitching win since 1968. Boston DH Darnell McDonald took the loss, making it the first game since 1902 in which both pitchers of record were position players.

The Orioles clinched their first non-losing season since 1997 on September 13, 2012, winning their 81st game on a walk-off single by Manny Machado in the bottom of the 14th inning against the Tampa Bay Rays.

On September 26, 2012, the Orioles hit 7 home runs versus the Toronto Blue Jays. Nate McLouth solo in the 1st inning, Jim Thome lead off in the 5th, Manny Machado solo homer in the 5th and a two-run shot in the 8th, Chris Davis three-run homer in the 5th and a two-run homer in the 7th, and Mark Reynolds two-run homer in the 6th.

After falling in extra innings to the New York Yankees on back-to-back nights in early April, the Orioles went 16–0 in extra-inning games through the rest of the season. They also went 29–9 in one-run games, which many analysts point to as the reason the Orioles snapped their long postseason drought, given their modest run differential of +7.

=== Accolades ===
The following players represented the Orioles in the 2012 Major League Baseball All-Star Game

- Jim Johnson
- Adam Jones
- Matt Wieters

The following players received Gold Glove Awards for the 2012 MLB season

- J. J. Hardy
- Adam Jones
- Matt Wieters

== Postseason ==
=== Wild Card Game ===
The Orioles took on the Texas Rangers in Arlington, Texas in the inaugural Wild Card "winner-take-all" format game for the right to play the New York Yankees in the 2012 American League Division Series, who are the top seed finishing with the best record in the AL at 95–67. The Orioles defeated Texas, 5–1, to win their first postseason game since 1997 and to advance to play the Yankees with the first two games in Baltimore.

In the end, Jim Johnson finished the Rangers off in the 9th despite them giving Baltimore a scare on having the bases loaded and two down. However, Johnson got David Murphy to fly out to Nate McLouth. Unlikely hero Joe Saunders picked up his first ever win at Rangers Stadium, where he was 0–6 with a 9.38 ERA in six career starts.

Team	1	2	3	4	5	6	7	8	9	R	H	E
Baltimore Orioles	1	0	0	0	0	1	1	0	2	5	8	2
Texas Rangers	1	0	0	0	0	0	0	0	0	1	9	2
Starting pitchers: BAL: Joe Saunders; TEX: Yu Darvish --> WP: Joe Saunders (1–0) LP: Yu Darvish (0–1)

=== Division Series ===
The Orioles next played the New York Yankees in the Division Series, which they lost in five games.

==== Game 1, October 7 ====
6:07 p.m. (EDT) at Oriole Park at Camden Yards in Baltimore, Maryland (moved to 8:47 p.m. EDT due to rain delay)

Team	1	2	3	4	5	6	7	8	9	R	H	E
New York	1	0	0	1	0	0	0	0	5	7	10	1
Baltimore	0	0	2	0	0	0	0	0	0	2	8	1
WP: CC Sabathia (1–0) LP: Jim Johnson (0–1); Home runs: NYY: Russell Martin (1); BAL: None

==== Game 2, October 8 ====
8:07 p.m. (EDT) at Oriole Park at Camden Yards in Baltimore, Maryland (moved to 8:47 p.m. EDT due to rain delay)

Team	1	2	3	4	5	6	7	8	9	R	H	E
New York	1	0	0	0	0	0	1	0	0	2	9	2
Baltimore	0	0	2	0	0	1	0	0	X	3	7	2
Starting pitchers: NYY: Andy Pettitte (0–0); BAL: Wei-Yin Chen (0–0) --> WP: Wei-Yin Chen (1–0) LP: Andy Pettitte (0–1) Sv: Jim Johnson (1)

==== Game 3, October 10 ====
7:37 p.m. (EDT) at Yankee Stadium in Bronx, New York

Team	1	2	3	4	5	6	7	8	9	10	11	12	R	H	E
Baltimore	0	0	1	0	1	0	0	0	0	0	0	0	2	6	0
New York	0	0	1	0	0	0	0	0	1	0	0	1	3	7	1
Starting pitchers: BAL: Miguel González (0–0); NYY: Hiroki Kuroda (0–0) --> WP: David Robertson (1–0) LP: Brian Matusz (0–1); Home runs: BAL: Ryan Flaherty (1), Manny Machado (1); NYY: Raúl Ibañez 2 (2)

==== Game 4, October 11 ====
7:37 p.m. (EDT) at Yankee Stadium in Bronx, New York

Team	1	2	3	4	5	6	7	8	9	10	11	12	13	R	H	E
Baltimore	0	0	0	0	1	0	0	0	0	0	0	0	1	2	8	1
New York	0	0	0	0	0	1	0	0	0	0	0	0	0	1	7	0
Starting pitchers: BAL: Joe Saunders (0–0); NYY: Phil Hughes (0–0) --> WP: Pedro Strop (1–0) LP: David Phelps (0–1) Sv: Jim Johnson (2); Home runs: BAL: Nate McLouth (1); NYY: None

==== Game 5, October 12 ====
5:07 p.m. (EDT) at Yankee Stadium in Bronx, New York

Team	1	2	3	4	5	6	7	8	9	R	H	E
Baltimore	0	0	0	0	0	0	0	1	0	1	4	0
New York	0	0	0	0	1	1	1	0	X	3	5	0
Starting pitchers: BAL: Jason Hammel (0–0); NYY: CC Sabathia (1–0) --> WP: CC Sabathia (2–0) LP: Jason Hammel (0–1); Home runs: BAL: None; NYY: Curtis Granderson (1)

=== Roster ===
2012 Baltimore Orioles
Roster
Pitchers: 38,34 Jake Arrieta; 38 Luis Ayala; 49 Jason Berken; 53 Zach Britton; 49 Dylan Bundy; 16 Wei-Yin Chen; 37 Dana Eveland; 50 Miguel González; 63 Kevin Gregg; 39 Jason Hammel; 29 Tommy Hunter; 43 Jim Johnson; 52 Steve Johnson; 27 Matt Lindstrom; 17 Brian Matusz; 56 Darren O'Day; 40 Troy Patton; 58 Zach Phillips; 55 Stuart Pomeranz; 48 J. C. Romero; 48 Joe Saunders; 58 Miguel Socolovich; 47 Pedro Strop; 30 Chris Tillman; 28 Randy Wolf	Catchers: 25,59 Luis Exposito; 28 Ronny Paulino; 31 Taylor Teagarden; 32 Matt Wieters; Infielders: 11 Robert Andino; 24 Wilson Betemit; 2 J. J. Hardy; 36 Nick Johnson; 13 Manny Machado; 54 Joe Mahoney; 35 Omar Quintanilla; 12 Mark Reynolds; 1 Brian Roberts; 6 Steven Tolleson	Outfielders: 13,70 Xavier Avery; 9,27 Endy Chávez; 19 Chris Davis; 3 Ryan Flaherty; 51 Lew Ford; 35,37 Bill Hall; 71 L. J. Hoes; 10 Adam Jones; 21 Nick Markakis; 48,9 Nate McLouth; 28,51 Steve Pearce; 14 Nolan Reimold; Other batters: 25 Jim Thome	Manager: 26 Buck Showalter; Coaches: 41 Rick Adair (pitching); 62 Rudy Árias (bullpen catcher); 57 Bill Castro (bullpen); 67 Ronnie Deck (bullpen catcher); 45 DeMarlo Hale (third base); 23 Wayne Kirby (first base); 15 Jim Presley (hitting); 77 John Russell (bench)

=== Season standings ===
==== American League East ====
AL East
Team	W	L	Pct.	GB	Home	Road
New York Yankees	95	67	.586	—	51‍–‍30	44‍–‍37
Baltimore Orioles	93	69	.574	2	47‍–‍34	46‍–‍35
Tampa Bay Rays	90	72	.556	5	46‍–‍35	44‍–‍37
Toronto Blue Jays	73	89	.451	22	41‍–‍40	32‍–‍49
Boston Red Sox	69	93	.426	26	34‍–‍47	35‍–‍46

==== American League Wild Card ====
Division winners
Team	W	L	Pct.
New York Yankees	95	67	.586
Oakland Athletics	94	68	.580
Detroit Tigers	88	74	.543

Wild Card teams (Top 2 teams qualify for postseason)
Team	W	L	Pct.	GB
Texas Rangers	93	69	.574	—
Baltimore Orioles	93	69	.574	—
Tampa Bay Rays	90	72	.556	3
Los Angeles Angels of Anaheim	89	73	.549	4
Chicago White Sox	85	77	.525	8
Seattle Mariners	75	87	.463	18
Toronto Blue Jays	73	89	.451	20
Kansas City Royals	72	90	.444	21
Boston Red Sox	69	93	.426	24
Cleveland Indians	68	94	.420	25
Minnesota Twins	66	96	.407	27

=== Record vs. opponents ===
2012 American League record Source: MLB Standings Grid – 2012
Team	BAL	BOS	CWS	CLE	DET	KC	LAA	MIN	NYY	OAK	SEA	TB	TEX	TOR	NL
Baltimore	–	13–5	6–2	4–4	3–3	5–4	2–7	5–2	9–9	4–5	8–1	10–8	2–5	11–7	11–7
Boston	5–13	–	6–2	5–3	5–5	4–3	0–6	4–3	5–13	1–8	5–4	9–9	2–6	7–11	11–7
Chicago	2–6	2–6	–	11–7	6–12	6–12	3–5	14–4	5–2	3–3	8–1	4–3	6–3	6–4	9–9
Cleveland	4–4	3–5	7–11	–	10–8	8–10	5–4	6–12	1–5	2–8	4–4	4–4	4–5	2–4	8–10
Detroit	3–3	5–5	12–6	8–10	–	13–5	5–5	10–8	4–6	4–3	1–5	5–2	3–7	4–2	11–7
Kansas City	4–5	3–4	12–6	10–8	5–13	–	4–5	7–11	3–4	5–4	1–7	4–2	4–5	2–6	8–10
Los Angeles	7–2	6–0	5–3	4–5	5–5	5–4	–	6–3	4–5	9–10	11–8	1–9	10–9	4–4	12–6
Minnesota	2–5	3–4	4–14	12–6	8–10	11–7	3–6	–	3–4	4–5	2–8	1–5	2–8	2–5	9–9
New York	9–9	13–5	2–5	5–1	6–4	4–3	5–4	4–3	–	5–5	6–3	8–10	4–3	11–7	13–5
Oakland	5–4	8–1	3–3	8–2	3–4	4–5	10–9	5–4	5–5	–	12–7	5–4	11–8	5–4	10–8
Seattle	1–8	4–5	1–8	4–4	5–1	7–1	8–11	8–2	3–6	7–12	–	4–6	9–10	6–3	8–10
Tampa Bay	8–10	9–9	3–4	4–4	2–5	2–4	9–1	5–1	10–8	4–5	6–4	–	5–4	14–4	9–9
Texas	5–2	6–2	3–6	5–4	7–3	5–4	9–10	8–2	3–4	8–11	10–9	4–5	–	6–3	14–4
Toronto	7–11	11–7	4–6	4–2	2–4	6–2	4–4	5–2	7–11	4–5	3–6	4–14	3–6	–	9–9

- Source: MLB Standings Grid – 2012

== Game log ==
Legend
Orioles Win	Orioles Loss	Game postponed

2012 Game Log
April (14–9)

#	Date	Opponent	Score	Win	Loss	Save	Attendance	Record
1	April 6	Twins	4–2	Arrieta (1–0)	Pavano (0–1)	Johnson (1)	46,773	1–0
2	April 7	Twins	8–2	Hunter (1–0)	Liriano (0–1)		31,532	2–0
3	April 8	Twins	3–1	Hammel (1–0)	Swarzak (0–1)	Johnson (2)	14,738	3–0
4	April 9	Yankees	2–6	Nova (1–0)	Matusz (0–1)		25,478	3–1
5	April 10	Yankees	4–5 (12)	Rapada (1–0)	Strop (0–1)	Rivera (1)	24,659	3–2
6	April 11	Yankees	4–6 (10)	Soriano (1–0)	Gregg (0–1)	Rivera (2)	22,919	3–3
7	April 13	@ Blue Jays	7–5	O'Day (1–0)	Oliver (0–1)	Johnson (3)	21,988	4–3
8	April 14	@ Blue Jays	6–4	Ayala (1–0)	Cordero (0–1)	Johnson (4)	28,355	5–3
9	April 15	@ Blue Jays	2–9	Drabek (2–0)	Matusz (0–2)		20,252	5–4
10	April 16	@ White Sox	10–4 (10)	Strop (1–1)	Stewart (0–1)		13,732	6–4
11	April 17	@ White Sox	3–2	Chen (1–0)	Danks (1–2)	Johnson (5)	11,267	7–4
12	April 18	@ White Sox	1–8	Peavy (2–0)	Hunter (1–1)		13,818	7–5
13	April 19	@ White Sox	5–3	Hammel (2–0)	Floyd (1–2)	Johnson (6)	11,836	8–5
14	April 20	@ Angels	3–6	Williams (1–1)	Matusz (0–3)	Walden (1)	32,272	8–6
15	April 21	@ Angels	3–6	Weaver (3–0)	Arrieta (1–1)		38,054	8–7
16	April 22	@ Angels	3–2 (10)	Strop (2–1)	Hawkins (0–1)	Johnson (7)	38,221	9–7
17	April 24	Blue Jays	2–1	Hunter (2–1)	Álvarez (0–2)	Strop (1)	11,058	10–7
18	April 25	Blue Jays	3–0	Hammel (3–0)	Drabek (2–1)	Strop (2)	10,415	11–7
19	April 26	Blue Jays	5–2	O'Day (2–0)	Janssen (1–1)	Ayala (1)	13,725	12–7
20	April 27	Athletics	2–5	McCarthy (1–3)	Arrieta (1–2)	Balfour (6)	18,297	12–8
21	April 28	Athletics	10–1	Chen (2–0)	Ross (1–1)		26,926	13–8
22	April 29	Athletics	5–2	Strop (3–1)	Balfour (0–1)		31,793	14–8
23	April 30	@ Yankees	1–2	Kuroda (2–3)	Hammel (3–1)	Rivera (5)	36,890	14–9

May (15–13)

#	Date	Opponent	Score	Win	Loss	Save	Attendance	Record
24	May 1	@ Yankees	7–1	Matusz (1–3)	Hughes (1–4)		37,790	15–9
25	May 2	@ Yankees	5–0	Arrieta (2–2)	Nova (3–1)		39,360	16–9
26	May 4	@ Red Sox	6–4 (13)	Patton (1–0)	Morales (0–1)	Johnson (8)	37,223	17–9
27	May 5	@ Red Sox	8–2	Hammel (4–1)	Cook (0–1)		37,581	18–9
28	May 6	@ Red Sox	9–6 (17)	Davis (1–0)	McDonald (0–1)		37,394	19–9
29	May 7	Rangers	3–14	Harrison (4–2)	Matusz (1–4)		11,938	19–10
30	May 8	Rangers	3–10	Feliz (2–1)	Arrieta (2–3)		11,263	19–11
	May 9	Rangers	Postponed (rain); Makeup: May 10 as part of a doubleheader					
31	May 10	Rangers	6–5	Chen (3–0)	Lewis (3–2)	Johnson (9)		20–11
32	May 10	Rangers	3–7	Holland (3–2)	Hunter (2–2)		19,250	20–12
33	May 11	Rays	4–3	O'Day (3–0)	Peralta (0–2)	Johnson (10)	26,669	21–12
34	May 12	Rays	5–3	Matusz (2–4)	Moore (1–3)	Johnson (11)	32,862	22–12
35	May 13	Rays	8–9	Shields (6–1)	Arrieta (2–4)	Rodney (10)	29,552	22–13
36	May 14	Yankees	5–8	Phelps (1–1)	Ayala (1–1)	Soriano (2)	16,492	22–14
37	May 15	Yankees	5–2	Chen (4–0)	Sabathia (5–1)	Johnson (12)	24,055	23–14
38	May 16	@ Royals	4–3 (15)	Gregg (1–1)	Adcock (0–1)	Johnson (13)	17,949	24–14
39	May 17	@ Royals	5–3	Matusz (3–4)	Hochevar (3–4)	Johnson (14)	31,076	25–14
40	May 18	@ Nationals	2–1 (11)	Gregg (2–1)	Mattheus (2–1)	Strop (3)	36,680	26–14
41	May 19	@ Nationals	6–5	Hammel (5–1)	Detwiler (3–3)	Johnson (15)	42,331	27–14
42	May 20	@ Nationals	3–9	Strasburg (4–1)	Chen (4–1)		41,918	27–15
43	May 21	Red Sox	6–8	Miller (1–0)	Gregg (2–2)	Aceves (10)	16,392	27–16
44	May 22	Red Sox	4–1	Matusz (4–4)	Doubront (4–2)	Johnson (16)	25,171	28–16
45	May 23	Red Sox	5–6	Bard (4–5)	Arrieta (2–5)	Aceves (11)	27,806	28–17
46	May 25	Royals	8–2	Hammel (6–1)	Chen (3–5)		28,954	29–17
47	May 26	Royals	3–4	Holland (1–2)	Strop (3–2)	Broxton (9)	26,714	29–18
48	May 27	Royals	2–4	Collins (2–0)	Matusz (4–5)	Broxton (10)	33,919	29–19
49	May 28	@ Blue Jays	2–6	Hutchison (4–2)	Hunter (2–3)	Janssen (4)	16,575	29–20
50	May 29	@ Blue Jays	6–8	Romero (6–1)	Arrieta (2–6)		17,352	29–21
51	May 30	@ Blue Jays	1–4	Morrow (6–3)	Hammel (6–2)	Janssen (5)	17,754	29–22

June (13–13)

#	Date	Opponent	Score	Win	Loss	Save	Attendance	Record
52	June 1	@ Rays	0–5	Price (7–3)	Chen (4–2)	Rodney (17)	17,224	29–23
53	June 2	@ Rays	2–1	Matusz (5–5)	Hellickson (4–2)	Johnson (17)	21,693	30–23
54	June 3	@ Rays	4–8	Moore (2–5)	Arrieta (2–7)		21,693	30–24
55	June 5	@ Red Sox	8–6 (10)	Johnson (1–0)	Aceves (0–3)		37,181	31–24
56	June 6	@ Red Sox	2–1	Chen (5–2)	Beckett (4–6)	Johnson (18)	37,243	32–24
57	June 7	@ Red Sox	0–7	Buchholz (6–2)	Matusz (5–6)		37,307	32–25
58	June 8	Phillies	6–9	Blanton (5–6)	Arrieta (2–8)	Papelbon (16)	40,459	32–26
59	June 9	Phillies	6–4 (12)	Ayala (2–1)	Rosenberg (0–1)		46,611	33–26
60	June 10	Phillies	5–4 (10)	O'Day (4–0)	Savery (0–1)		45,267	34–26
61	June 12	Pirates	8–6	Chen (6–2)	Lincoln (3–2)	Johnson (19)	15,618	35–26
62	June 13	Pirates	7–1	Arrieta (3–8)	Correia (2–6)		23,238	36–26
63	June 14	Pirates	12–6	Hunter (3–3)	Bédard (4–7)		29,995	37–26
64	June 15	@ Braves	2–4	Durbin (3–0)	Matusz (5–7)	Kimbrel (19)	30,384	37–27
65	June 16	@ Braves	5–0	Hammel (7–2)	Beachy (5–5)		41,131	38–27
66	June 17	@ Braves	2–0	Chen (7–2)	Delgado (4–7)	Johnson (20)	29,530	39–27
67	June 18	@ Mets	0–5	Dickey (11–1)	Arrieta (3–9)		29,014	39–28
68	June 19	@ Mets	0–5	Santana (5–3)	Hunter (3–4)		32,587	39–29
69	June 20	@ Mets	3–4	Gee (5–5)	Matusz (5–8)	Francisco (17)	29,855	39–30
70	June 22	Nationals	2–1	Hammel (8–2)	Zimmermann (3–6)	Johnson (21)	45,891	40–30
71	June 23	Nationals	1–3	Jackson (4–4)	Chen (7–3)	Clippard (12)	46,298	40–31
72	June 24	Nationals	2–1	Strop (4–2)	Burnett (0–1)	Johnson (22)	41,794	41–31
73	June 26	Angels	3–7	Wilson (9–4)	Matusz (5–9)		24,296	41–32
74	June 27	Angels	1–13	Weaver (8–1)	Hammel (8–3)		18,055	41–33
75	June 28	Indians	2–7	McAllister (2–1)	Chen (7–4)		17,676	41–34
76	June 29	Indians	9–8	Lindstrom (1–0)	Smith (5–2)	Johnson (23)	24,779	42–34
77	June 30	Indians	5–11	Tomlin (4–5)	Eveland (0–1)		35,335	42–35

July (13–14)

#	Date	Opponent	Score	Win	Loss	Save	Attendance	Record
78	July 1	Indians	2–6	Masterson (5–7)	Matusz (5–10)		16,689	42–36
79	July 2	@ Mariners	3–6	Delabar (2–1)	Hammel (8–4)	Wilhelmsen (7)	14,805	42–37
80	July 3	@ Mariners	5–4	O'Day (5–0)	Furbush (4–2)	Johnson (24)	16,270	43–37
81	July 4	@ Mariners	4–2	Tillman (1–0)	Noesí (2–11)	Johnson (25)	21,982	44–37
82	July 5	@ Angels	7–9	Hawkins (2–1)	Ayala (2–2)	Frieri (11)	38,104	44–38
83	July 6	@ Angels	3–2	González (1–0)	Wilson (9–5)	Johnson (26)	42,716	45–38
84	July 7	@ Angels	0–3	Weaver (10–1)	Hammel (8–5)	Downs (8)	41,147	45–39
85	July 8	@ Angels	0–6	Mills (1–0)	Chen (7–5)		37,108	45–40
ASG	July 10	All-Star Game	AL 0–8 NL	Cain	Verlander		Kauffman Stadium, Kansas City, MO	
86	July 13	Tigers	2–7	Fister (3–6)	Hammel (8–6)		35,566	45–41
87	July 14	Tigers	8–6 (13)	Gregg (3–2)	Benoit (1–2)		43,215	46–41
88	July 15	Tigers	0–4	Verlander (10–5)	González (1–1)		30,439	46–42
89	July 16	@ Twins	7–19	Diamond (8–3)	Tillman (1–1)		32,455	46–43
90	July 17	@ Twins	4–6	Burnett (3–2)	Ayala (2–3)	Burton (3)	32,202	46–44
91	July 18	@ Twins	2–1	Hunter (4–4)	Liriano (3–9)	Johnson (27)	33,195	47–44
92	July 19	@ Twins	4–3	Chen (8–5)	Burnett (3–3)	Johnson (28)	37,676	48–44
93	July 20	@ Indians	10–2	González (2–1)	Lowe (8–8)		33,954	49–44
94	July 21	@ Indians	3–1	Tillman (2–1)	McAllister (4–2)	Johnson (29)	36,247	50–44
95	July 22	@ Indians	4–3	Britton (1–0)	Tomlin (5–7)	Johnson (30)	28,049	51–44
96	July 23	@ Indians	1–3	Masterson (7–8)	Hunter (4–5)	Perez (27)	18,264	51–45
97	July 24	Rays	1–3	Hellickson (5–6)	Chen (8–6)	Rodney (28)	17,592	51–46
98	July 25	Rays	1–10	Price (14–4)	González (2–2)		19,582	51–47
99	July 26	Rays	6–2	Tillman (3–1)	Shields (8–7)		21,301	52–47
100	July 27	Athletics	9–14	Blevins (4–0)	Johnson (1–1)		29,278	52–48
101	July 28	Athletics	1–6	Colón (7–8)	Hunter (4–6)		21,143	52–49
102	July 29	Athletics	6–1	Chen (9–6)	Blackley (3–3)		19,698	53–49
103	July 30	@ Yankees	5–4	González (3–2)	García (4–5)	Johnson (31)	43,052	54–49
104	July 31	@ Yankees	11–5	Tillman (4–1)	Nova (10–5)		42,821	55–49

August (18–9)

#	Date	Opponent	Score	Win	Loss	Save	Attendance	Record
105	August 1	@ Yankees	3–12	Hughes (11–8)	Britton (1–1)		44,593	55–50
106	August 3	@ Rays	0–2	Moore (8–7)	Hunter (4–7)	Rodney (32)	18,410	55–51
107	August 4	@ Rays	4–0	Chen (10–6)	Hellickson (6–7)		20,612	56–51
108	August 5	@ Rays	1–0 (10)	Ayala (3–3)	Peralta (1–4)	Johnson (32)	29,530	57–51
109	August 6	Mariners	3–1	Tillman (5–1)	Vargas (12–8)	Johnson (33)	21,184	58–51
110	August 7	Mariners	8–7 (14)	O'Day (6–0)	Kelley (2–3)		15,433	59–51
111	August 8	Mariners	9–2	Johnson (1–0)	Millwood (4–10)		17,312	60–51
112	August 9	Royals	2–8	Smith (3–4)	Chen (10–7)		21,226	60–52
113	August 10	Royals	7–1	González (4–2)	Hochevar (7–10)		17,277	61–52
114	August 11	Royals	3–7	Mendoza (6–8)	Tillman (5–2)		40,456	61–53
115	August 12	Royals	5–3	Ayala (4–3)	Chen (8–10)	Johnson (34)	20,935	62–53
116	August 14	Red Sox	7–1	Chen (11–7)	Beckett (5–10)		26,204	63–53
117	August 15	Red Sox	5–3	González (5–2)	Cook (3–6)	Johnson (35)	22,269	64–53
118	August 16	Red Sox	3–6	Buchholz (11–3)	Ayala (4–4)	Aceves (24)	25,483	64–54
119	August 17	@ Tigers	3–5	Benoit (2–3)	O'Day (6–1)	Valverde (23)	41,620	64–55
120	August 18	@ Tigers	3–2	Britton (2–1)	Porcello (9–8)	Johnson (36)	42,132	65–55
121	August 19	@ Tigers	7–5	Chen (12–7)	Fister (7–8)	Johnson (37)	40,511	66–55
122	August 20	@ Rangers	1–5	Dempster (7–6)	González (5–3)		36,257	66–56
123	August 21	@ Rangers	5–3	Tillman (6–2)	Feldman (6–9)	Johnson (38)	32,146	67–56
124	August 22	@ Rangers	3–12	Holland (8–6)	Hunter (4–8)		40,714	67–57
125	August 24	Blue Jays	6–4	Britton (3–1)	Villanueva (6–4)	Johnson (39)	25,754	68–57
126	August 25	Blue Jays	8–2	Johnson (2–0)	Morrow (7–5)		25,082	69–57
	August 26	Blue Jays	Postponed (rain); Makeup: September 24 as part of a doubleheader					
127	August 27	White Sox	4–3	Strop (5–2)	Myers (2–6)	Johnson (40)	10,955	70–57
128	August 28	White Sox	6–0	Tillman (7–2)	Sale (15–5)		12,841	71–57
129	August 29	White Sox	1–8	Axelrod (2–2)	Saunders (6–11)		13,098	71–58
130	August 30	White Sox	5–3	Britton (4–1)	Quintana (5–3)	Johnson (41)	10,141	72–58
131	August 31	@ Yankees	6–1	González (6–3)	Kuroda (12–10)		43,352	73–58

September/October (20–11)

#	Date	Opponent	Score	Win	Loss	Save	Attendance	Record
132	September 1	@ Yankees	3–4	Logan (6–2)	Chen (12–8)	Soriano (35)	46,122	73–59
133	September 2	@ Yankees	8–3	Wolf (4–10)	Hughes (13–12)		46,501	74–59
134	September 3	@ Blue Jays	4–0	Saunders (7–11)	Happ (10–11)		17,220	75–59
135	September 4	@ Blue Jays	12–0	Britton (5–1)	Villanueva (7–5)		13,556	76–59
136	September 5	@ Blue Jays	4–6	Delabar (4–1)	González (6–4)		14,458	76–60
137	September 6	Yankees	10–6	O'Day (7–1)	Robertson (1–6)		46,298	77–60
138	September 7	Yankees	5–8	Hughes (14–12)	Chen (12–9)		40,861	77–61
139	September 8	Yankees	5–4	Saunders (8–11)	Sabathia (13–5)	Johnson (42)	46,067	78–61
140	September 9	Yankees	3–13	Chamberlain (1–0)	Britton (5–2)		40,346	78–62
141	September 11	Rays	9–2	Johnson (3–0)	Moore (10–10)		23,828	79–62
142	September 12	Rays	3–2	Johnson (2–1)	Farnsworth (1–5)		26,076	80–62
143	September 13	Rays	3–2 (14)	Wolf (5–10)	Archer (0–3)		25,130	81–62
144	September 14	@ Athletics	2–3	Milone (13–10)	Saunders (8–12)	Balfour (18)	35,067	81–63
145	September 15	@ Athletics	2–5	Parker (11–8)	Britton (5–3)	Balfour (19)	20,342	81–64
146	September 16	@ Athletics	9–5	Matusz (6–10)	Straily (2–1)	Johnson (43)	20,539	82–64
147	September 17	@ Mariners	10–4	Tillman (8–2)	Noesí (2–12)		13,036	83–64
148	September 18	@ Mariners	4–2 (18)	Hunter (5–8)	Luetge (2–2)	Johnson (44)	12,608	84–64
149	September 19	@ Mariners	3–1 (11)	Ayala (5–4)	Kinney (0–3)	Johnson (45)	14,001	85–64
150	September 21	@ Red Sox	4–2	González(7–4)	Lester (9–13)	Johnson (46)	37,731	86–64
151	September 22	@ Red Sox	9–6 (12)	Hunter (6–8)	Aceves (2–10)	Johnson (47)	37,570	87–64
152	September 23	@ Red Sox	1–2	Tazawa (1–1)	Ayala (5–5)	Bailey (6)	37,310	87–65
153	September 24	Blue Jays	4–1	Johnson (4–0)	Álvarez (9–14)	Johnson (48)		88–65
154	September 24	Blue Jays	5–9	Romero (9–14)	Chen (12–10)		31,015	88–66
155	September 25	Blue Jays	0–4	Laffey (4–6)	Saunders (8–13)		30,205	88–67
156	September 26	Blue Jays	12–2	González (8–4)	Villanueva (7–7)		26,513	89–67
157	September 28	Red Sox	9–1	Tillman (9–2)	Cook (4–11)		33,518	90–67
158	September 29	Red Sox	4–3	Hunter (7–8)	Doubront (11–10)	Johnson (49)	46,311	91–67
159	September 30	Red Sox	6–3	Saunders (9–13)	Stewart (1–4)	Johnson (50)	41,257	92–67
160	October 1	@ Rays	3–5	Cobb (11–9)	Chen (12–11)	Rodney (47)	13,666	92–68
161	October 2	@ Rays	1–0	González (9–4)	Shields (15–10)	Johnson (51)	13,460	93–68
162	October 3	@ Rays	1–4	Hellickson (10–11)	Tillman (9–3)	Rodney (48)	17,909	93–69

== Player stats ==
=== Batting ===
Note: G = Games played; AB = At bats; R = Runs scored; H = Hits; 2B = Doubles; 3B = Triples; HR = Home runs; RBI = Runs batted in; AVG = Batting average; SB = Stolen bases

Player	G	AB	R	H	2B	3B	HR	RBI	AVG	SB
Robert Andino	127	384	41	81	13	1	7	28	.211	5
Jake Arrieta	2	3	0	0	0	0	0	0	.000	0
Xavier Avery	32	94	14	21	6	1	1	6	.223	6
Wilson Betemit	102	341	41	89	19	0	12	40	.261	0
Endy Chávez	64	158	15	32	6	0	2	12	.203	3
Wei-Yin Chen	2	3	0	0	0	0	0	0	.000	0
Chris Davis	139	515	75	139	20	0	33	85	.270	2
Luis Exposito	9	18	2	1	0	0	0	0	.056	0
Ryan Flaherty	77	153	15	33	2	1	6	19	.216	1
Lew Ford	25	71	7	13	3	0	3	4	.183	1
Bill Hall	7	9	2	2	0	0	1	1	.222	0
Jason Hammel	2	4	0	0	0	0	0	0	.000	0
J. J. Hardy	158	663	85	158	30	2	22	68	.238	0
L. J. Hoes	2	1	0	0	0	0	0	0	.000	0
Tommy Hunter	1	2	0	0	0	0	0	0	.000	0
Nick Johnson	38	87	9	18	4	0	4	11	.207	2
Adam Jones	162	648	103	186	39	3	32	82	.287	16
Manny Machado	51	191	24	50	8	3	7	26	.262	2
Joe Mahoney	2	4	0	0	0	0	0	0	.000	0
Nick Markakis	104	420	59	125	28	3	13	54	.298	1
Brian Matusz	2	4	0	1	0	0	0	0	.250	0
Nate McLouth	55	209	35	56	12	1	7	18	.268	12
Ronny Paulino	20	63	5	16	3	0	0	5	.254	0
Steve Pearce	28	71	8	18	4	0	3	14	.254	0
Omar Quintanilla	36	99	12	23	3	0	3	12	.232	0
Nolan Reimold	16	67	10	21	6	0	5	10	.313	1
Mark Reynolds	135	457	65	101	26	0	23	69	.221	1
Brian Roberts	17	66	2	12	0	0	0	5	.182	1
Jim Thome	28	101	8	26	5	0	3	10	.257	0
Taylor Teagarden	22	57	4	9	3	0	2	9	.158	0
Steve Tolleson	29	71	7	13	3	0	2	6	.183	1
Matt Wieters	144	526	67	131	27	1	23	83	.249	3
Team totals	162	5560	712	1375	270	16	214	677	.247	58

=== Pitching ===
Note: W = Wins; L = Losses; ERA = Earned run average; G = Games pitched; GS = Games started; SV = Saves; IP = Innings pitched; H = Hits allowed; R = Runs allowed; ER = Earned runs allowed; BB = Walks allowed; K = Strikeouts

Player	W	L	ERA	G	GS	SV	IP	H	R	ER	BB	K
Jake Arrieta	3	9	6.20	24	18	0	114.2	122	82	79	35	109
Luis Ayala	5	5	2.64	66	0	1	75.0	81	27	22	14	51
Jason Berken	0	0	18.00	1	0	0	1.0	6	7	2	1	0
Zach Britton	5	3	5.07	12	11	0	60.1	61	37	34	32	53
Dylan Bundy	0	0	0.00	2	0	0	1.2	1	0	0	1	0
Wei-Yin Chen	12	11	4.02	32	32	0	192.2	186	97	86	57	154
Chris Davis	1	0	0.00	1	0	0	2.0	2	0	0	1	2
Dana Eveland	0	1	4.73	14	2	0	32.1	32	18	17	13	18
Miguel González	9	4	3.25	18	15	0	105.1	92	38	38	35	77
Kevin Gregg	3	2	4.95	40	0	0	43.2	50	24	22	24	37
Jason Hammel	8	6	3.43	20	20	0	118.0	104	48	45	42	113
Tommy Hunter	7	8	5.45	33	20	0	133.2	161	85	81	27	77
Jim Johnson	2	1	2.44	71	0	51	68.2	55	21	19	14	41
Steve Johnson	4	0	2.11	12	4	0	38.1	23	9	9	18	46
Matt Lindstrom	1	0	2.72	34	0	0	36.1	35	14	11	12	30
Brian Matusz	6	10	4.87	34	16	0	98.0	112	61	53	41	81
Darren O'Day	7	1	2.28	69	0	0	67.0	49	17	17	14	69
Troy Patton	1	0	2.43	54	0	0	55.2	45	15	15	12	49
Zach Phillips	0	0	6.00	6	0	0	6.0	7	4	4	3	5
Stu Pomeranz	0	0	3.00	3	0	0	6.0	7	2	2	1	3
J. C. Romero	0	0	6.75	5	0	0	4.0	7	4	3	1	1
Joe Saunders	3	3	3.63	7	7	0	44.2	49	20	18	8	23
Miguel Socolovich	0	0	6.97	6	0	0	10.1	11	8	8	6	6
Pedro Strop	5	2	2.44	70	0	3	66.1	52	18	18	37	58
Chris Tillman	9	3	2.93	15	15	0	86.0	66	38	28	24	66
Randy Wolf	2	0	5.28	5	2	0	15.1	17	9	9	2	7
Team totals	93	69	3.90	162	162	55	1483.0	1433	705	642	481	1177

== Farm system ==
Level	Team	League	Manager
AAA	Norfolk Tides	International League	Ron Johnson
AA	Bowie Baysox	Eastern League	Gary Kendall
A	Frederick Keys	Carolina League	Orlando Gómez
A	Delmarva Shorebirds	South Atlantic League	Ryan Minor
A-Short Season	Aberdeen IronBirds	New York–Penn League	Gary Allenson
Rookie	GCL Orioles	Gulf Coast League	Ramón Sambo
