= Wei-Yin Chen =

Taiwanese baseball player (born 1985)

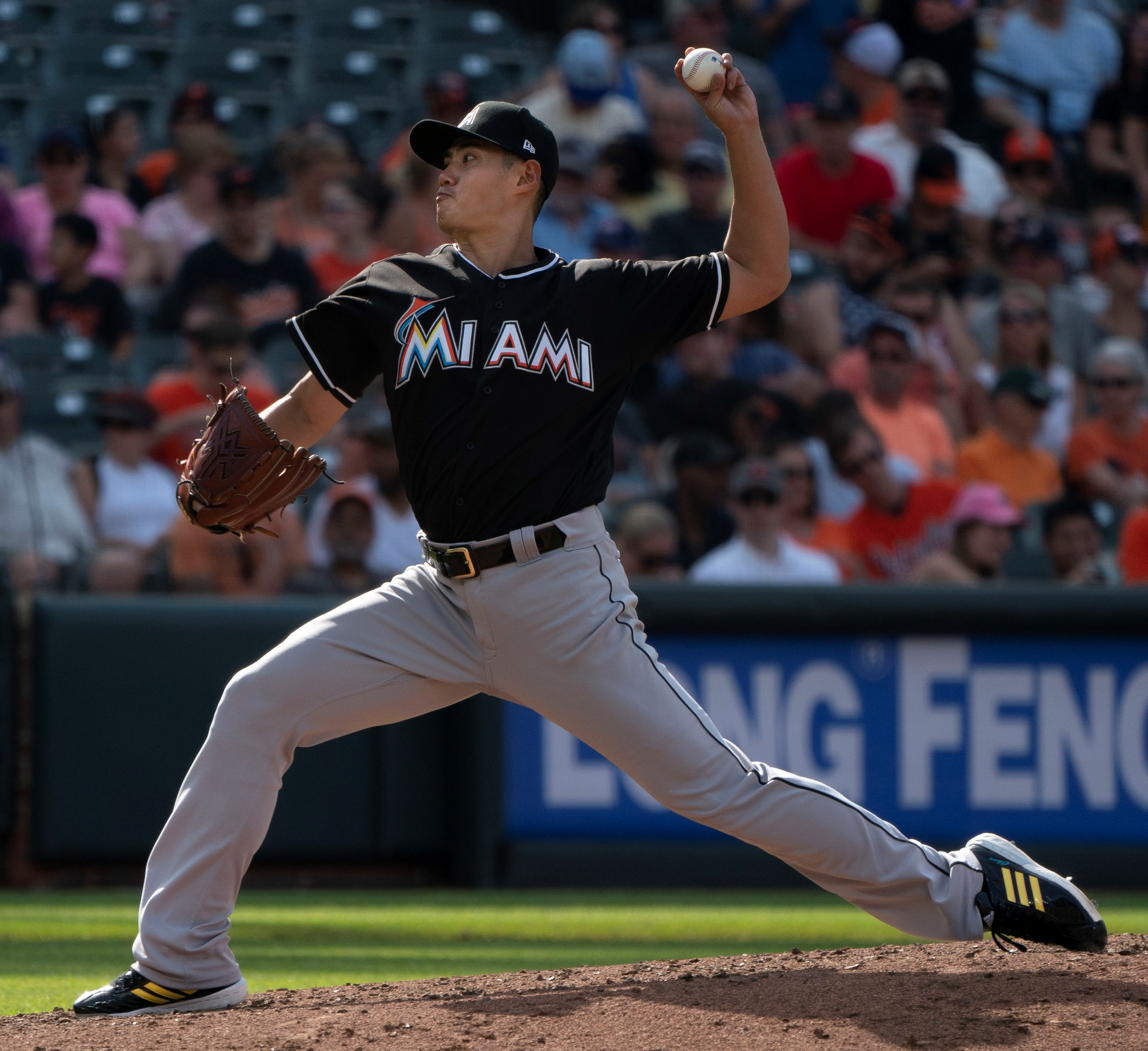
- Chen with the Miami Marlins in 2018
- Pitcher
- Born: July 21, 1985 (age 41); Kaohsiung County, Taiwan
- Batted: Right Threw: Left

Professional debut
- NPB: April 3, 2005, for the Chunichi Dragons
- MLB: April 10, 2012, for the Baltimore Orioles

Last appearance
- NPB: May 7, 2021, for the Hanshin Tigers
- MLB: September 28, 2019, for the Miami Marlins

NPB statistics
- Win–loss record: 37–33
- Earned run average: 2.60
- Strikeouts: 541

MLB statistics
- Win–loss record: 59–51
- Earned run average: 4.18
- Strikeouts: 846
- Stats at Baseball Reference

Teams
- Chunichi Dragons (2004–2011); Baltimore Orioles (2012–2015); Miami Marlins (2016–2019); Chiba Lotte Marines (2020); Hanshin Tigers (2021–2022)

Career highlights and awards
- NPB Central League ERA title (2009)
Medals
Men's baseball
Representing Chinese Taipei
World Junior Baseball Championship
Silver medal – second place	2002 Sherbrooke	Team

Wei-Yin Chen (Chinese: 陳偉殷; pinyin: Chén Wěiyīn; born July 21, 1985) is a Taiwanese former professional baseball pitcher. He played in Major League Baseball (MLB) for the Baltimore Orioles and Miami Marlins, and in Nippon Professional Baseball (NPB) for the Chunichi Dragons, Chiba Lotte Marines, and Hanshin Tigers. He earned the Guinness World Record for most appearances on the cover of MLB: The Show videogames, featuring on Taiwan releases for five consecutive years from 2013-2017.

== Early life ==
Wei-Yin Chen was born in Kaohsiung County, Taiwan. He attended Ciao-Tou Junior High School and Kaoyuan Vocational High School, which was also attended by former Major League pitcher Chin-hui Tsao and several other Taiwanese professional baseball players.

== Professional career ==
=== Chunichi Dragons ===
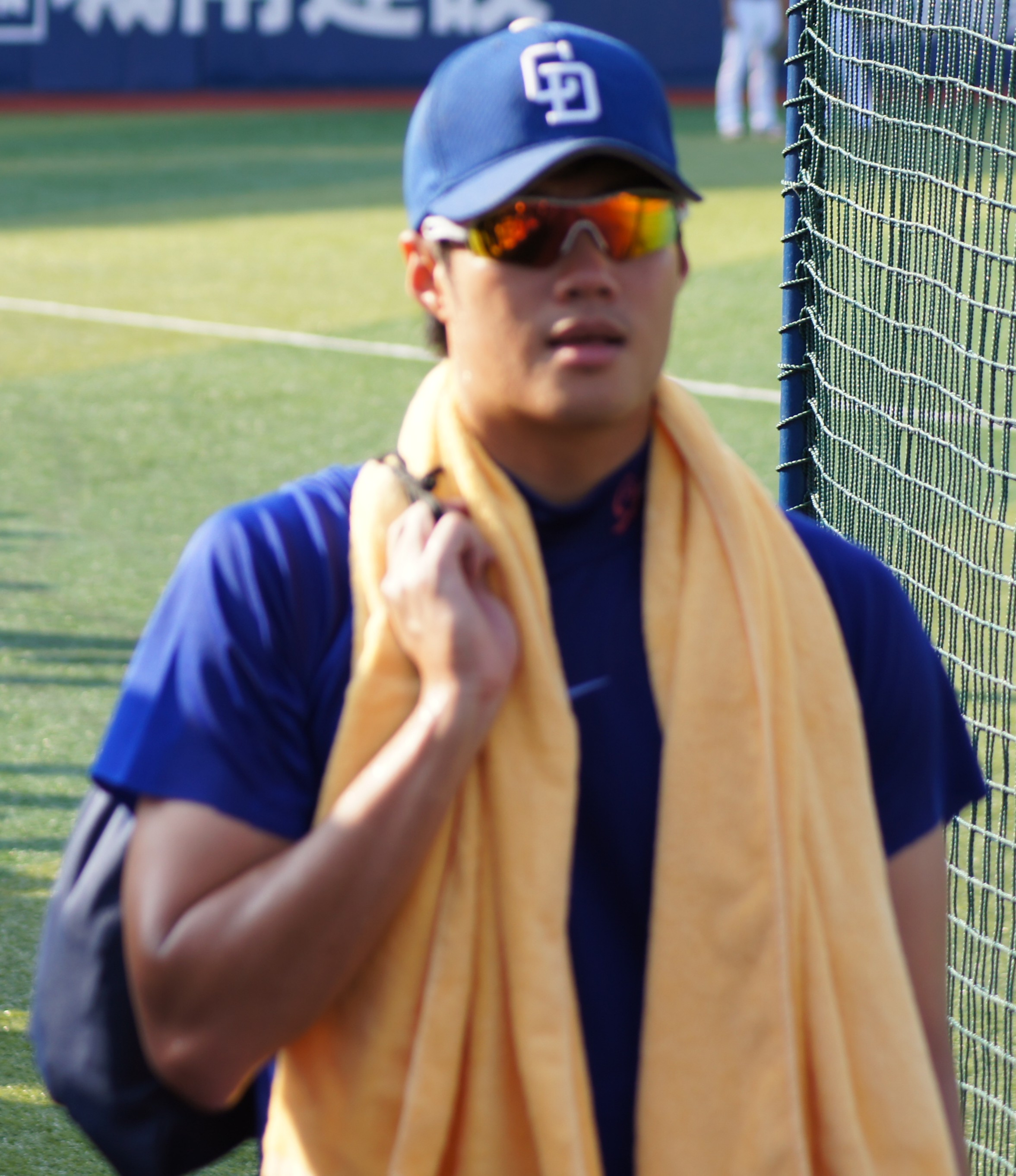
Chen with the Chunichi Dragons in 2011

He was a pitcher for the Chunichi Dragons in Nippon Professional Baseball (NPB) from 2004 through 2011. Chen had Tommy John surgery at the end of 2006 season. His best season in Japan came in 2009 when he posted a 1.54 earned run average (ERA) to lead the league. When he came out of the Nippon League, FanGraphs described him as being an extreme control pitcher with poor velocity. A clause implemented into his contract with Chunichi allowed him to opt out after the 2011 season at age 26.

=== Baltimore Orioles ===
==== 2012 season ====
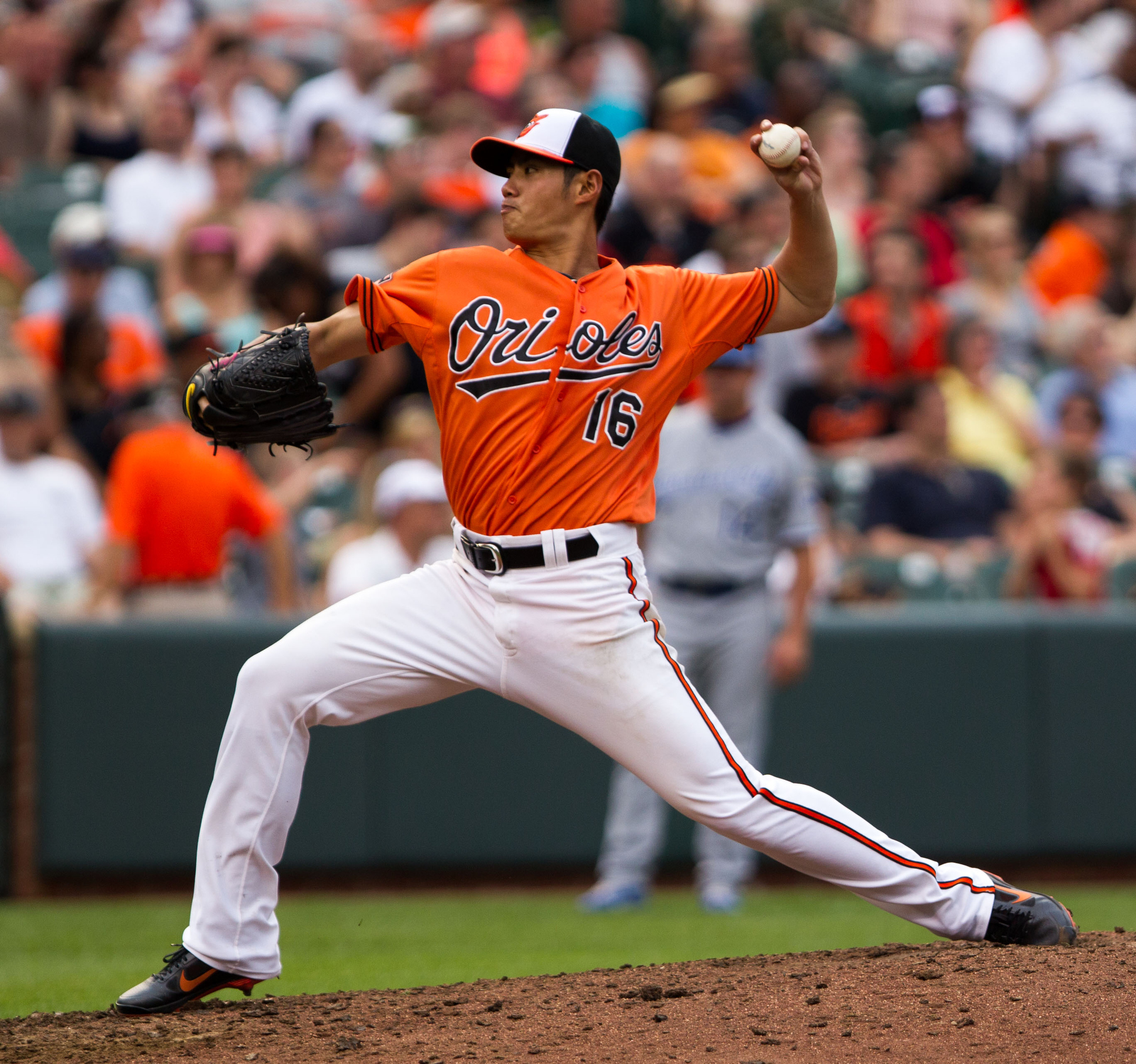
Chen pitching for the Baltimore Orioles in 2012

After the 2011 season, Chen signed as an international free agent with the Baltimore Orioles. Chen was the first Taiwanese player ever signed by the Orioles. He made his MLB debut on April 10, 2012, against the New York Yankees in Baltimore. The game was broadcast live on national television in native Taiwan, and Chen totaled 5 2/3 innings and gave up two earned runs striking out six in a no-decision that the Orioles would later go on to lose in extra innings. In total, Chen finished the season leading the team with 32 starts during which he totaled 12 wins and 11 losses and posted an ERA of 4.02 in 192.2 innings pitched. In 2012, Chen was "the only constant in the (Orioles) rotation" and was consistent throughout the year. Chen finished fourth in the AL for Rookie of the Year voting.

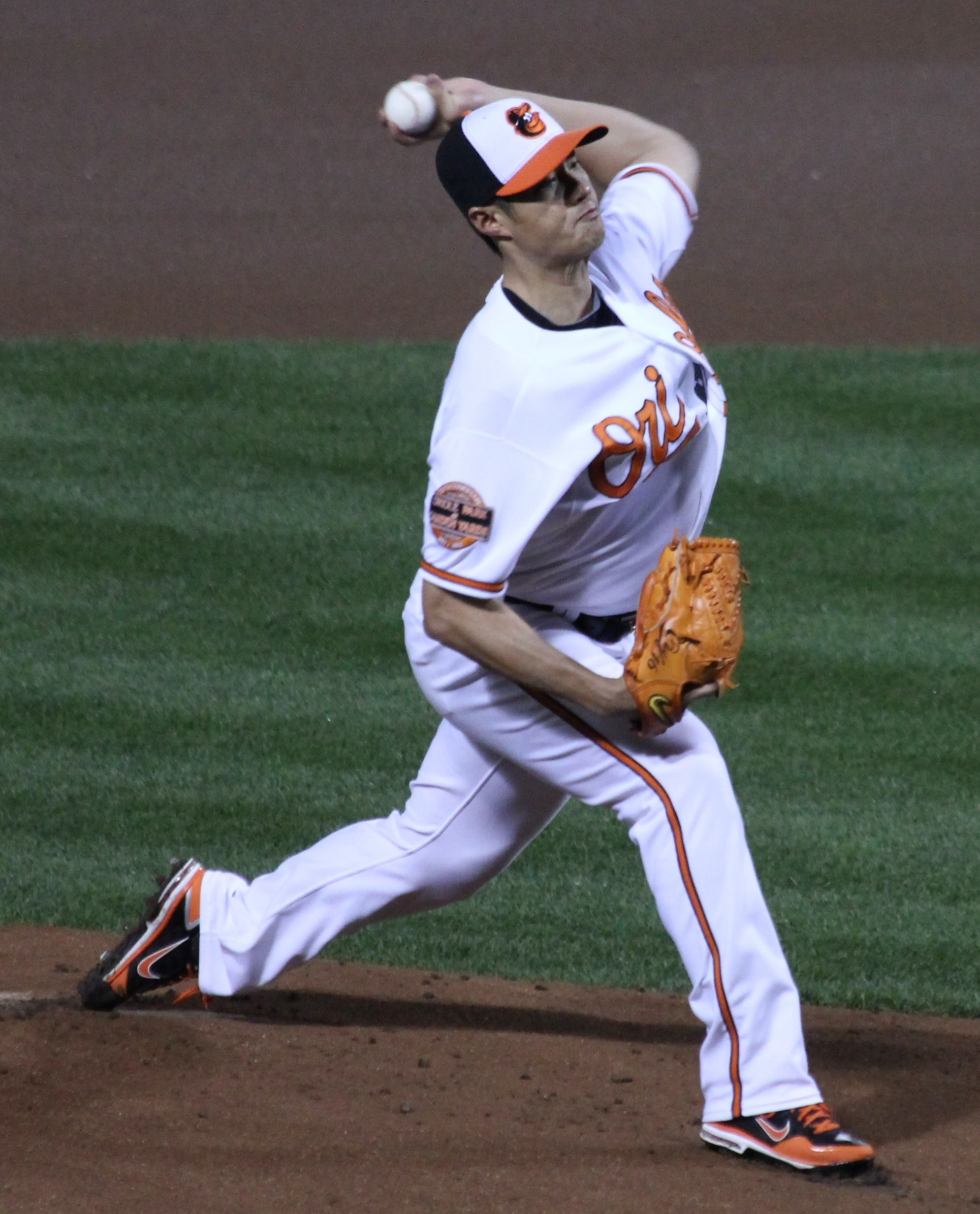
Chen pitching for the Baltimore Orioles in 2012 ALDS Game, and earned the win.

==== 2013 season ====
Coming out of spring training, Chen won the number two spot in the Orioles' starting rotation behind Jason Hammel. Chen set a goal to throw 200 innings on the season. In his first three starts, he lacked run support and went 0–2 despite posting a 4.00 ERA. On May 15, 2013, the Orioles placed Chen on the disabled list, his first-ever stint there, with an injury to his right oblique. In his return from the disabled list on July 10, 2013, Chen pitched seven innings in a matchup against the Texas Rangers striking out four and allowing three hits, earning the win. Overall in 2013, Chen finished 7–7 with a 4.07 ERA in 23 starts. During the 2013 off-season, Chen underwent knee surgery to remove bone spurs.

==== 2014 season ====
Chen pitched a season-high of eight strikeouts in a win against the Seattle Mariners on August 1, 2014. He dedicated the win to victims of the 2014 Kaohsiung gas explosions, which occurred hours earlier in his hometown. On September 10, Chen picked up his 15th win of the season against the Boston Red Sox and carried a perfect game into the sixth inning until Dan Butler's first major league hit. Chen finished the season with a 16–6 record and 3.54 ERA over 185 2/3 innings. In game 3 of the 2014 ALCS on October 14, Chen pitched 5 1/3 innings on 80 pitches and gave up 2 runs in a loss against the Kansas City Royals.

==== 2015 season ====
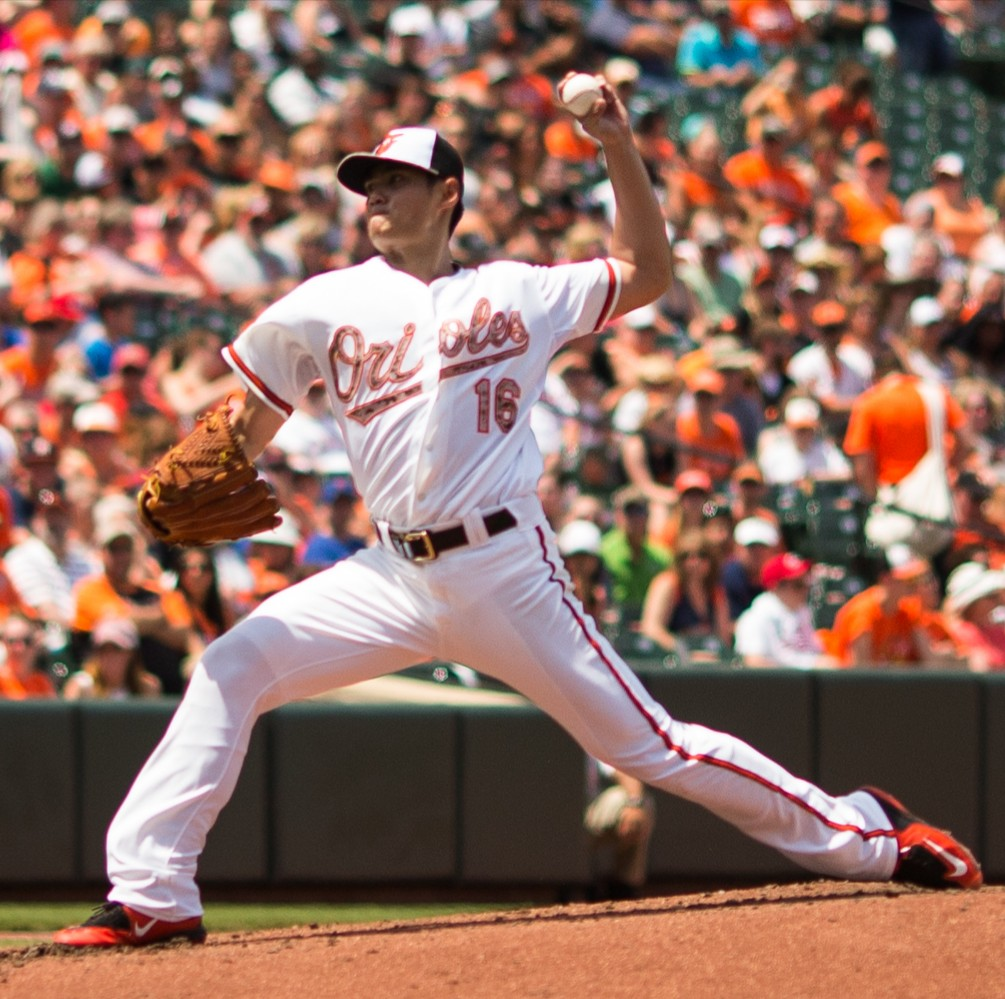
Chen pitching for the Baltimore Orioles in 2015 Military Appreciation Day

On June 26, 2015, Chen became the second Taiwanese-born player to have 100 career starts in the major leagues (after Chien-Ming Wang), allowing two runs and striking out five over six innings in a no decision against the Cleveland Indians. Despite only recording a 4–5 record at the break, Chen pitched to a 2.78 ERA and a 1.09 WHIP, along with 90 strikeouts in 110 innings over the first half of the season. Chen finished the season with an 11–8 record and a career-best 3.34 ERA over 191 1/3 innings pitched.

=== Miami Marlins ===
==== 2016 season ====
On January 13, 2016, Chen agreed to a five-year contract worth US$80 million with the Miami Marlins. Chen was named the starting pitcher for the opening day of the 2016 season, becoming the second Taiwanese pitcher to make a start on opening day since Chien-Ming Wang in 2008. In his first season as a Marlin, Chen went 5–5 in 22 starts after spending some time on the disabled list with an injury. He posted the worst ERA of his career, finishing at 4.96 in 123 innings.

==== 2017 season ====
On April 8, Chen hit his first major league hit, an infield single off of New York Mets starter Zack Wheeler. He was placed on the disabled list after 5 starts due to a partial UCL tear. Chen was activated off the disabled list on September 4 and would pitch out of the bullpen. In nine total appearances (five starts) for the year, he logged a 2-1 record and 3.82 ERA with 25 strikeouts over 33 innings of work.

==== 2018 season ====
Chen made his first start on April 28 against the Colorado Rockies after going almost a year without a big league start, getting the win after pitching 5 1/3 innings, in which he giving up just one run on four hits, two walks, and three strikeouts. On July 24, Chen hit his first major league double off of Atlanta Braves starter Julio Teherán. He made 26 starts for Miami during the season, compiling a 6-12 record and 4.79 ERA with 111 strikeouts across 133 1/3 innings pitched.

==== 2019 season ====
Chen made 45 appearances out of the bullpen for the Marlins in 2019, but struggled to an 0-1 record and 6.59 ERA with 63 strikeouts across 68 1/3 innings of work. Chen was designated for assignment by Miami on November 20, 2019. He was released and became a free agent after clearing waivers on November 27.

=== Seattle Mariners ===
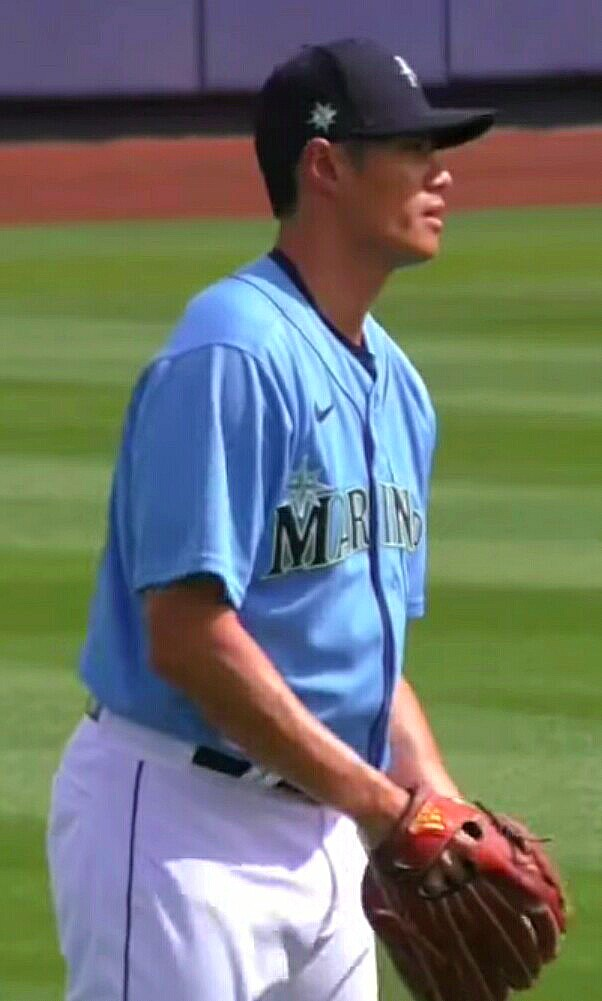
Chen with the Seattle Mariners in 2020 Spring Training

On January 30, 2020, Chen signed a minor league contract with the Seattle Mariners. Chen was released by the Mariners organization on June 25. Despite being released, Chen was the highest-paid baseball player of the 2020 MLB season at $22 million.

=== Chiba Lotte Marines ===
On September 22, 2020, Chen signed with the Chiba Lotte Marines of Nippon Professional Baseball. In four starts for Lotte, he posted an 0-3 record and 2.42 ERA with 14 strikeouts over 26 innings of work. On December 2, Chen became a free agent.

=== Hanshin Tigers ===
On December 22, 2020, Chen signed with the Hanshin Tigers of NPB for the 2021 season. He made only two appearances for the main club, logging a 1–0 record and 3.86 ERA with 7 strikeouts across 9 1/3 innings pitched. Chen was released by Hanshin on June 29, 2022, after only pitching in the Western League during the year.

=== Long Island Ducks ===
On April 2, 2024, Chen signed with the Long Island Ducks of the Atlantic League of Professional Baseball. In 17 starts for the Ducks, Chen struggled to a 5–5 record and 6.37 ERA with 63 strikeouts across 87 2/3 innings pitched. He became a free agent following the season.

=== Retirement and legacy ===
Chen announced his retirement from professional baseball on February 26, 2025. At his retirement, he led all Taiwanese Major League Baseball pitchers in innings pitched (1,064 2/3) and games started (170), and was second to Chien-Ming Wang in wins (59). Chen disclosed that he had decided against joining Taiwan's Chinese Professional Baseball League during his playing career as he was unsure if the CPBL would allow him to return to baseball leagues overseas.

== International career ==
Chen played for the Taiwanese national team in the 2004 and 2008 Olympic Games.

== Scouting report ==
Chen was an "extreme flyball pitcher", at one point having an HR/9 innings of 1.3, way above MLB average. Chen pitched from a three-quarters arm slot and threw a four-seam fastball averaging 91–92 mph (which topped out at 95–96 mph). In addition, he threw a two-seamer, a slider, a changeup, and an occasional curveball. Since he previously pitched in Japan where he started on five days rest rather than four, with the Orioles he initially had durability issues and was 0–4 in his last seven starts in 2012. Chen has been described as a legitimate middle-of-the-rotation starter. An opposing scout said, "I watched Wei-Yin Chen and swore I was watching Tom Glavine. He has such an effortless delivery and an above-average change up, and knows how to pitch inside."

== Philanthropy ==
In 2012, Chen started a baseball scholarship program for Taiwanese students, contributing funds based on statistical milestones reached per season. He expanded the charity's efforts in 2015, to cover animal protection and children's welfare.

== See also ==
- List of Major League Baseball players from Taiwan
