= Josh Bell (third baseman) =

American baseball player (born 1986)

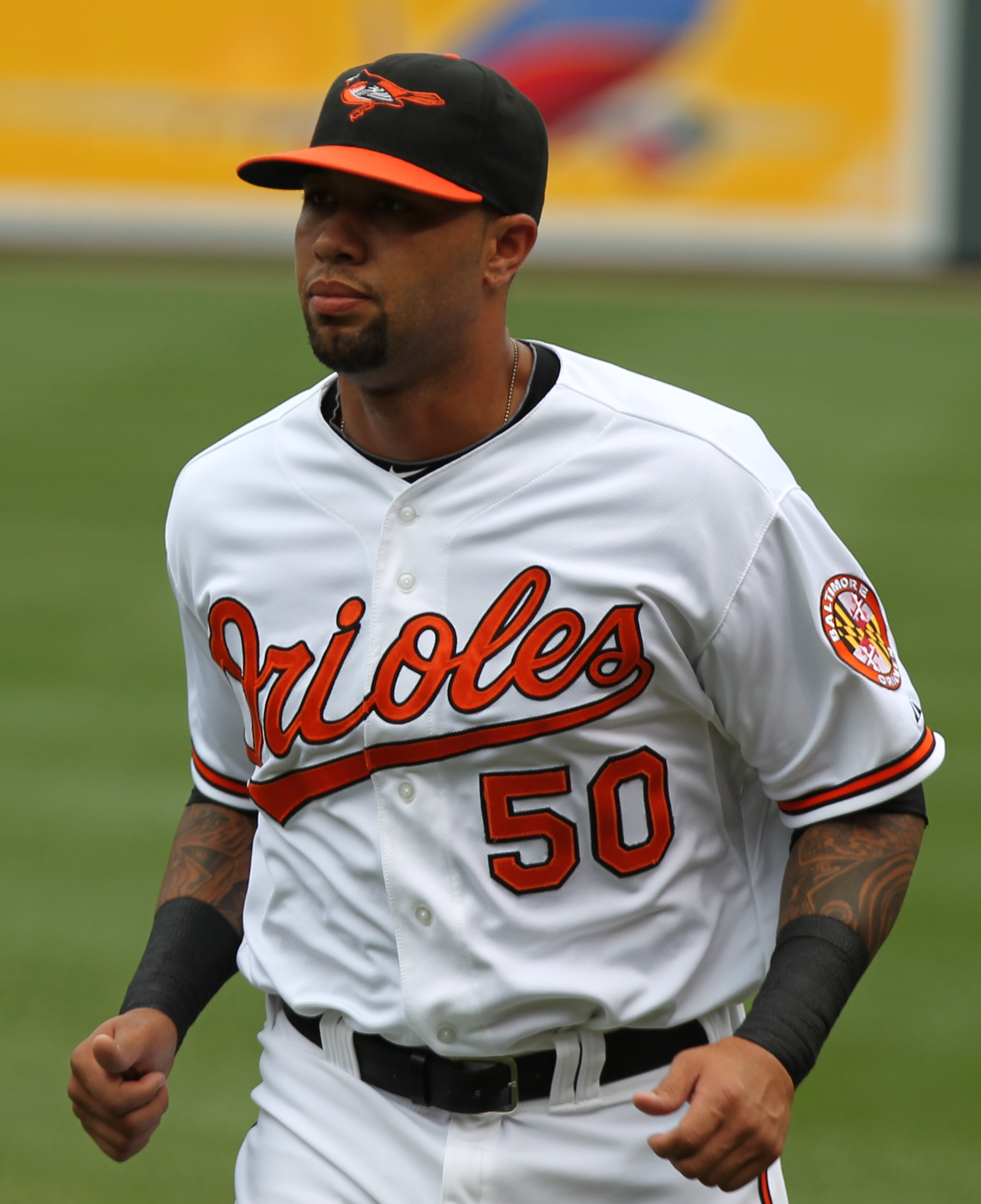
- Bell with the Baltimore Orioles in 2011
- Third baseman
- Born: November 13, 1986 (age 39); Rockford, Illinois, U.S.
- Batted: Switch Threw: Right

Professional debut
- MLB: July 1, 2010, for the Baltimore Orioles
- KBO: March 29, 2014, for the LG Twins

Last appearance
- MLB: June 26, 2012, for the Arizona Diamondbacks
- KBO: June 25, 2014, for the LG Twins

MLB statistics
- Batting average: .195
- Home runs: 4
- Runs batted in: 22

KBO statistics
- Batting average: .267
- Home runs: 10
- Runs batted in: 39
- Stats at Baseball Reference

Teams
- Baltimore Orioles (2010–2011); Arizona Diamondbacks (2012); LG Twins (2014)

Joshua Lee Bell (born November 13, 1986) is an American former professional baseball player. A third baseman, Bell played in Major League Baseball (MLB) for the Baltimore Orioles and Arizona Diamondbacks from 2010 to 2012, and in the KBO League for the LG Twins in 2014.

== Career ==
=== Los Angeles Dodgers ===
Bell was drafted by the Los Angeles Dodgers in the fourth round of the 2005 Major League Baseball draft out of Santaluces High School in Lantana, Florida. After spending the rest of that year with the Gulf Coast Dodgers, he spent 2006 with the Ogden Raptors, where he batted .308 and was selected to the Pioneer League Post-Season All-Star team after he was third in the league in home runs, fourth in extra-base hits and fifth in RBIs. He split 2007 between the Great Lakes Loons and Inland Empire 66ers.

Bell began 2008 with Inland Empire and played in 51 games for them before missing the rest of the season after undergoing preventive knee surgery in June. In 2009, he was promoted to the Double-A Chattanooga Lookouts where he was selected to the mid-season Southern League All-Star team. In the All-Star game, Bell was 2 for 4 with a homer and 2 RBIs and was voted the All-Star Game Most Valuable Player.

=== Baltimore Orioles ===
On July 30, 2009, Bell and Chattanooga teammate Steve Johnson was traded to the Baltimore Orioles for relief pitcher George Sherrill.

On July 1, 2010, Bell was called up to replace Luke Scott, who hurt his left hamstring rounding the bases after a home run. After Baltimore traded Miguel Tejada to the San Diego Padres on July 29, Bell became the starting third basemen for the remainder of the 2010 season. In the spring of 2011, Bell was optioned to the Orioles Triple-A team in Norfolk.

On April 17, 2012. the Orioles designated Bell for assignment to make room for catcher Luis Exposito on the 40-man roster.

=== Arizona Diamondbacks ===
Bell was traded to the Arizona Diamondbacks for a player to be named later (PTBNL) or cash on April 21, 2012. Upon his acquisition, Bell was assigned to Triple-A Reno and was recalled to the Diamondbacks on May 21 when Cody Ransom was designated for assignment. The teams later agreed on Mike Belfiore as the PTBNL.

After hitting just .173 in 52 at-bats with a .501 OPS, Bell was outrighted off the Diamondbacks' 40-man roster at the conclusion of the season. He refused the assignment, however, and elected free agency.

=== Chicago White Sox ===
On January 10, 2013, Bell signed a minor league contract with the Chicago White Sox. He made 15 appearances for the Triple-A Charlotte Knights, hitting .273/.310/.345 with four RBI over 55 at-bats. On May 7, Bell was released by the White Sox organization.

=== New York Yankees ===
On May 17, 2013, Bell signed with the New York Yankees and was assigned to Triple-A Scranton/Wilkes-Barre. In 37 games, he hit .205 with five home runs and 17 RBI before being released on July 10.

=== LG Twins ===
Bell re-signed with the Dodgers on a minor league contract on December 16, 2013, but shortly afterwards chose to break that contract to sign with the LG Twins of the KBO League.

He was released from the team on July 2, 2014.

=== San Diego Padres ===
On February 19, 2015, Bell signed a minor league contract with the San Diego Padres. The Padres released him on May 25, having not played a game in the minors for the organization.

=== Rojos del Aguila de Veracruz ===
On June 2, 2015, Bell signed with the Rojos del Aguila de Veracruz of the Mexican League. In 32 games for Veracruz, he slashed .239/.341/.407 with five home runs and 17 RBI. Bell was released by the team on July 9.

=== Lancaster Barnstormers ===
On March 22, 2016, Bell signed with the Lancaster Barnstormers of the Atlantic League of Professional Baseball. He retired from active playing and was named hitting coach for Lancaster for the 2017 season. In 131 games for the team, he hit .296/.386/.481 with 19 home runs and 87 RBI.

On May 18, 2017, Bell re-signed with the Barnstormers. In 53 games for Lancaster, he batted .247/.354/.426 with seven home runs, 23 RBI, and four stolen bases. Bell became a free agent after the 2017 season.

Bell re-signed with the team for a third season on June 6, 2018. In 45 games, he hit .237/.341/.404 with six home runs, 29 RBI, and seven stolen bases. He became a free agent after the season and re-signed with the team as a player-coach for the 2019 season. In 91 games for Lancaster, he slashed .213/.341/.300 with four home runs, 24 RBI, and six stolen bases.
