= Catholic Central School (Latham, New York) =

School in Latham, New York

Location
- 347 Old Loudon Road; Latham, (Albany County), New York 12110; United States; 42.7580575°N 73.75283086253017°W

Information
- Type: Private, Coeducational
- Motto: Pro Deo Et Patria (For God and Country)
- Religious affiliation: Roman Catholic
- Established: 2022
- CEEB code: 335-595
- Grades: Pre-k–12
- Enrollment: 385
- Campus size: 19 acres
- Colors: Purple and White
- Slogan: "Academic Excellence. Rooted in Christ."
- Mascot: Crusader
- Team name: Crusaders
- Alumni: 25,000+
- Website: catholiccentralschool.org

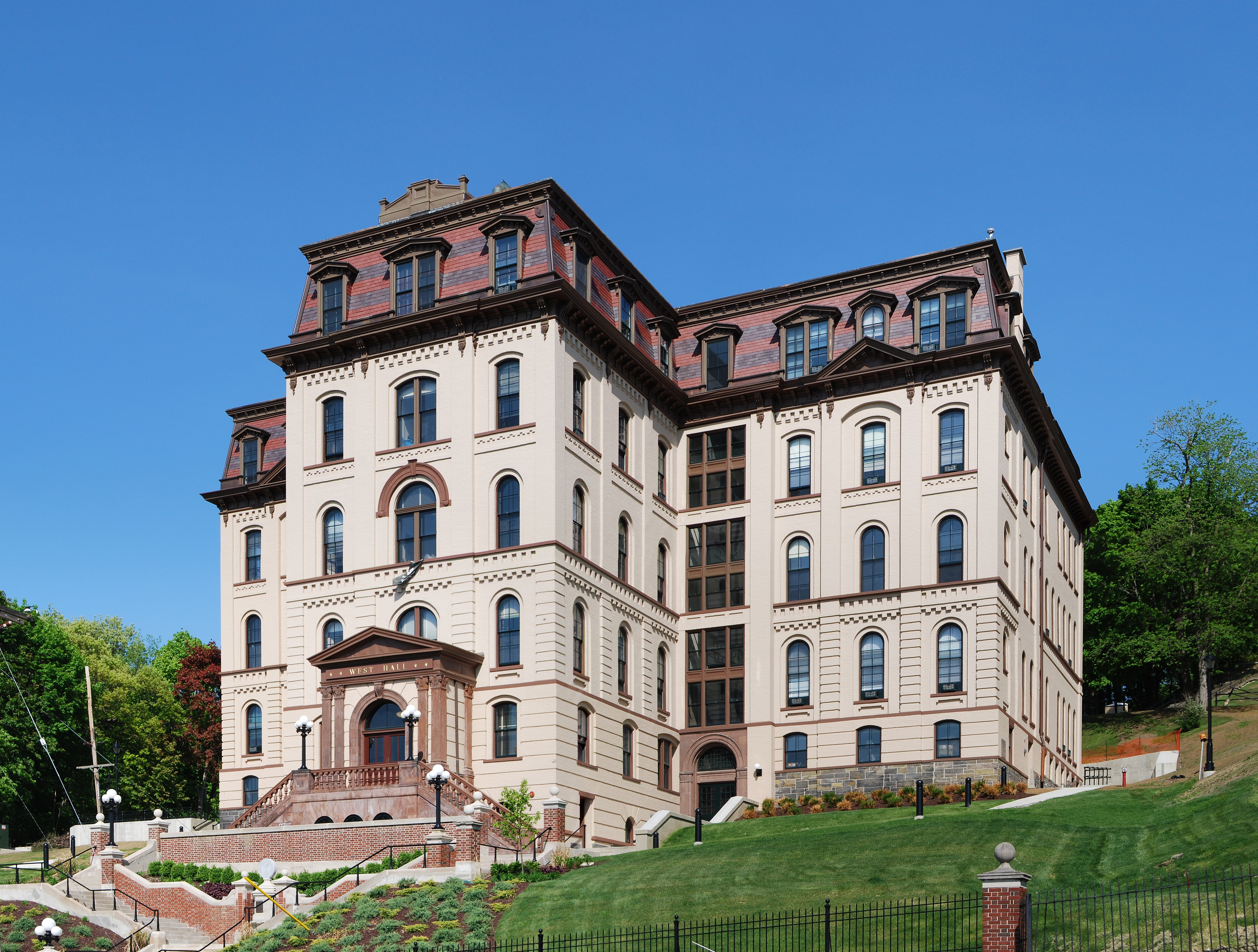
Original Eighth Street home of CCHS from 1923 to 1953, now a part of Rensselaer Polytechnic Institute.

Catholic Central School is a private, centrally located pre-K-12 regional Catholic school in Latham, New York, within the Roman Catholic Diocese of Albany. It was formed in 2022 with the merger of Saint Ambrose elementary school in Latham with Catholic Central High School in Troy, New York. The new school is located on the grounds of the former Saint Ambrose School. The school's Troy property was put up for sale in March 2022, and was listed on the National Register of Historic Places in 2024.

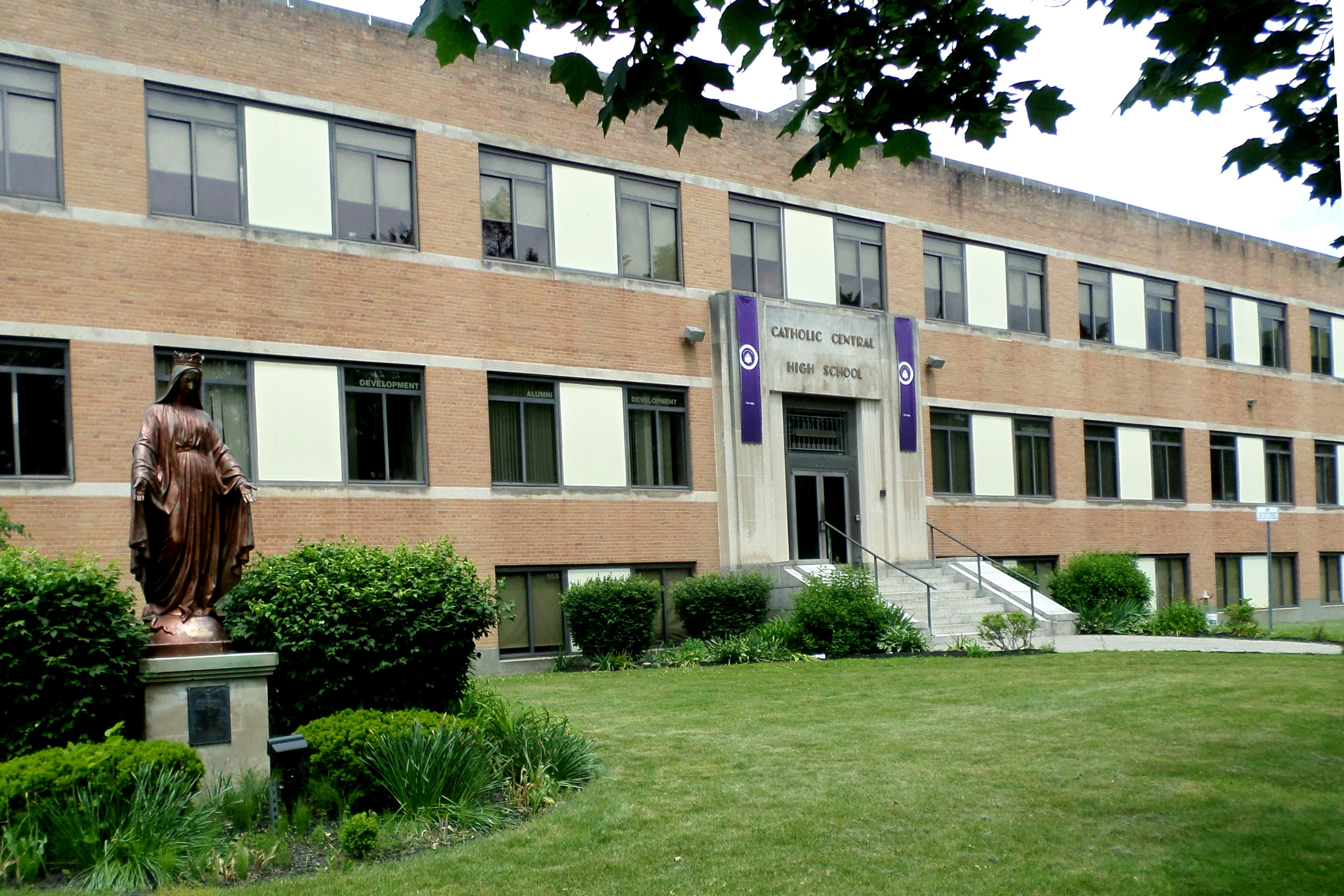
Catholic Central High School, Troy

== Catholic Central ==
In 2022 Catholic Central High School partnered with St. Ambrose Parish school in Latham to create a Pre-K - Grade 12 regional institution. The school is located on the St. Ambrose campus. Students at Catholic Central are encouraged to perform ten hours of community service.

=== Athletics ===
The school offers indoor track, volleyball, and basketball; boys and girls baseball, bowling, cheerleading, cross country, football, golf, soccer, softball, tennis, track and field.

== History ==
=== Catholic Central High School ===
Catholic Central High School, a coeducational, college preparatory school, was founded in September 1923 by Bishop Edmund F. Gibbons, at the request of the pastors from parishes in Troy, Watervliet and Green Island. The school drew students from Sacred Heart (Troy), St. Augustine's (Troy), Our Lady of Victory (Troy), St. Paul's (Troy), St. Mary's (Troy), St. Joseph's (Troy), St. Anthony's (Troy), St. Jude the Apostle (Wynantskill), St. Mary's (Hoosick Falls), St. Mary's (Waterford), Holy Spirit (East Greenbush), St. Ambrose (Latham), and St. Pius X (Loudonville).

It was originally located on Eighth Street in Troy before moving to its location at 116th Street and Seventh Avenue in North Troy. The original Catholic Central High School building on Eighth St. has now become part of Rensselaer Polytechnic Institute.

The first principal was Father Burns. The student body numbered 525 students. The first class graduated in June, 1924 and numbered thirty-two. When the doors reopened in September, 1924, there were 1,046 students registered in the high school. In 1953, Catholic Central purchased the Cluett Peabody & Company building, which had been used for experimental purposes in the field of textile research as a miniature textile mill.

In February, 1953, Catholic Central High School was relocated to its present-day campus in North Troy. In 1957, where once lay a vacant lot, soon became the Monsignor Burns Gymnasium. The basketball team no longer had to play its "home" games "away". From 1960 to 1965, Father Harry Joseph Flynn taught English at Catholic Central. Flynn later became Archbishop of Saint Paul and Minneapolis.

Catholic High once held more than 2,000 students, but enrollment declined as Catholic churches and elementary schools closed in the city. In 1989, the school added seventh and eighth grades and in 2021, the school added sixth grade. The school closed in June 2022 and the property was put up for sale in March 2022.

==== Information and achievements ====
Catholic Central High School was located in Troy, New York at 116th Street and 7th Avenue, central to the Capital District. It served students from Albany, Columbia, Rensselaer, Saratoga and Schenectady counties. Busing was provided by the resident public school district for families within a fifteen-mile (24 km) radius. Buses came from vicinities in Clifton Park, Niskayuna, Colonie, Troy, Waterford, East Greenbush, Brunswick (Brittonkill), Averill Park and Hoosick Falls.

Catholic Central High School educated students in grades 6–12 and offered a college preparatory/Regents curriculum along with the university at the High School program under the direction of the State University of New York at Albany. Advanced placement courses were also offered in several disciplines. The gymnasium housed not only the gym but cafeteria, stage for dramatic productions, a 3,500-square-foot (330 m^{2}) weight room and band room. Tuition assistance was available, including a summer work study program.

Catholic Central won the International Center of the Capital Region Academic Worldquest Competition twice, in 2018 and 2019, earning a spot in the National Academic Worldquest Competition both years in Washington DC.

CCHS participated in the Colonial Council athletic league. The 2010–11 Girls Varsity Volleyball team won the Big 10 Championship and went on to the Section II semi-finals where they lost to Queensbury. They defeated many great teams, especially Troy High School, whose team had not lost a game in 3 seasons until their defeat by Catholic Central.

==== Notable alumni ====
- Matthew Harvey Clark, Roman Catholic bishop, late Bishop Emeritus of the Roman Catholic Diocese of Rochester
- Chris Conroy, screenwriter of Lionsgate Pictures' "Employee of the Month" and other films
- Joe Mahoney, professional baseball player who played first base for the Miami Marlins.
- Maureen Stapleton, American actress in film, theater and television
- Michael Botticelli, former director of the White House Office of National Drug Control Policy under President Obama
- Justin Rohrwasser, place kicker for the New England patriots of the national football league.
- Denise Doring VanBuren, 45th President General of the Daughters of the American Revolution

=== Saint Ambrose School ===
Saint Ambrose School was a private Roman Catholic elementary school in Latham, New York, located within the Roman Catholic Diocese of Albany. During the 2021–2022 school year, Saint Ambrose School had about 200 students. The school was merged with Catholic Central High School in Troy, and became the Catholic Central School starting in the 2022–2023 school year.

==== History ====
Saint Ambrose parish was founded in 1924. One year the parish school opened, staffed by the Sisters of the Presentation of the Blessed Virgin Mary. It moved to its current location in 1956.

== Merger ==
In 2021, Catholic Central announced it would sell and close its Troy campus and relocate to the 19-acre St. Ambrose campus in Latham, creating a new regional K-12 campus through a merger with St. Ambrose. Albany Catholic Schools Superintendent Giovanni Virgiglio said that considerations that affected the decision to move to St. Ambrose were the convenience of the location to the areas from which the school draws its students, and the fact that Lansingburgh was a split campus with students having to cross the street to get to the cafeteria and gymnasium. In March 2026, The Roman Catholic Diocese of Albany announced that Grades 9-12 would end at Catholic Central School following the 2025-2026 school year.
