= West Hall (Rensselaer Polytechnic Institute) =

- Old Troy Hospital
- U.S. National Register of Historic Places
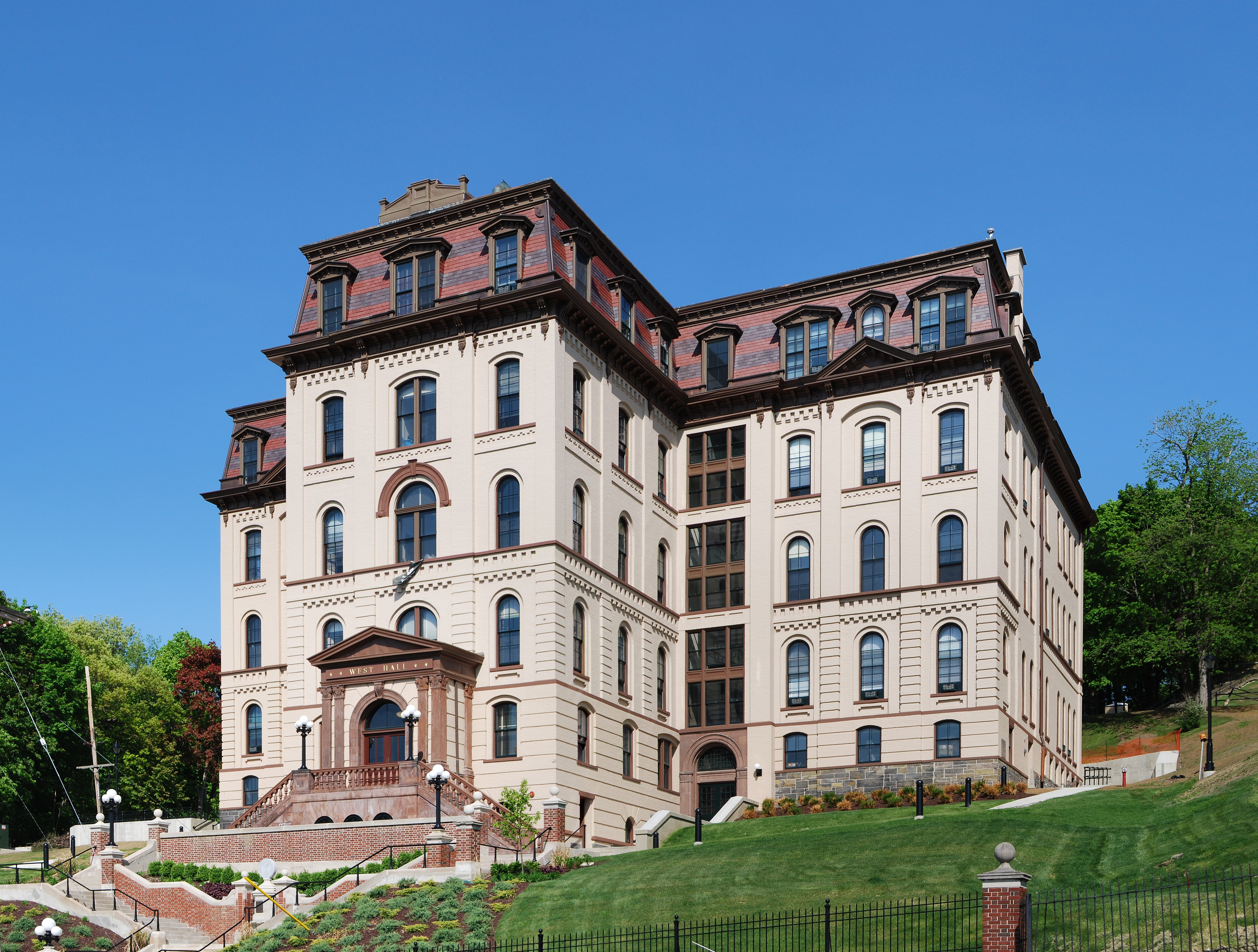
- After the 2004-2008 exterior renovation

- Location within New York Location within the United States
- Location: 8th Street, Troy, New York, USA
- Coordinates: 42°43′54″N 73°41′0″W
- Built: 1869
- Architect: Marcus F. Cummings
- Architectural style: French Second Empire
- NRHP reference No.: 73001257
- Added to NRHP: October 25, 1973

West Hall is a building on the Rensselaer Polytechnic Institute campus in Troy, New York, United States. It is currently home to the Arts Department at RPI. It was previously a hospital, and is listed on the National Register of Historic Places as Old Troy Hospital.

== Description ==
Designed by Marcus F. Cummings, West Hall is noted as a major example of French Second Empire architecture. Currently, it currently houses several offices, art studios, and rehearsal space for the Rensselaer Symphony Orchestra. There is a large auditorium for performances and a few music practice rooms. A plaque on the southwest corner of reads as follows: "The Corner Stone of the Troy Hospital was laid on the 28th of June 1868 by the right Rev. Bishop Nick Sirano". The hospital was opened in 1869 and was operated by the Sisters of Charity of Saint Vincent de Paul.

A folklore surrounds the construction of "cables" to stabilize the building on the shifting hill. The cables supposedly were put in place to anchor the building's foundations to an outcropping of bedrock near Walker Labs. According to Thomas Zimmie PhD, PE, D.GE, a professor in the Civil Engineering Department of RPI, this kind of myth comes about worldwide. According to him, "There are no cables holding West Hall... There are slope problems on campus, but nothing that can't be fixed." While Professor Zimmie acknowledges that a problem will eventually occur, he says "It will probably take at least a few thousand years."

== History ==
=== Troy Hospital (1891–1913/23) ===
At the end of the Civil War, the growth of Troy and two fires at the old hospital site resulted in plans for a new and larger hospital, which was located at Fulton and 8th Streets. The Old Troy Hospital was completed in the fall of 1871 in the “Grant style” of building. It attracted young, newly minted physicians to the upgraded facility that was thought to be on the leading edge of health care in the U.S. As a hospital, the building was the second site of Troy Hospital founded by Sisters of Charity in 1850, and the new building was at a higher elevation to increase "natural ventilation".

The hospital was the first full-service hospital outside of New York City. It treated "the poor and indigent of the city", the industrial workers, and Irish Catholic immigrants whom the Catholic priests would not visit because of their residence in almshouses and orphanages. Over the years, it developed private rooms for the more affluent members of the Troy community to have respite. In 1895 the hospital added a “special operating room suite” and began a nursing school.

The hospital attracted several physicians of note. Dr. John Thorn was the first appointed physician. Thorn trained in England, was one of early Troy’s most famous residents, and was twice elected mayor. A service offered in 1905 was the availability of horse-drawn ambulances. Between 1913 and 1923, the building languished and was not in use.

=== Catholic Central High School (1923–1952) ===
The Sisters of Charity sold the building to the Albany Diocese in 1922. In the spring of that year, Bishop Gibbons of the Albany Catholic Diocese began a movement to raise capital to transform the hospital into a Catholic Central High School. A total of $250,000 was raised and a reconstruction plan of the building was implemented. The Diocese added an auditorium, gymnasium, and cafeteria.

The school opened in 1923, but delays caused classes to be held at St. Peter's Lyceum until early 1924. During West Hall's tenure as Catholic Central High School, it acquired many of the classroom structures seen today, including separate entrances for the sexes. Currently visible are the southernmost entrance labeled "Boys" and the northernmost entrance labeled "Girls".

=== Rensselaer Polytechnic Institute (1952-present) ===
Rensselaer Polytechnic Institute acquired the building in 1952 and named it West Hall, as it was one of the westernmost buildings on campus. Following a complete renovation, the School of Humanities and Social Sciences and the Department of Geology occupied the building. A geology museum was housed there at one time, the remnants of which can still be seen in parts of the basement.

Between 2004 and 2008 there was a major renovation of the exterior, which was made in part by a $150,000 Campus Heritage Initiative Grant. The building was completely repainted and detailed, and the front steps were re-landscaped. During 2008–09 new stairs were constructed traversing the hill on the north side, as well as more robust concrete retaining walls.

== Gallery ==
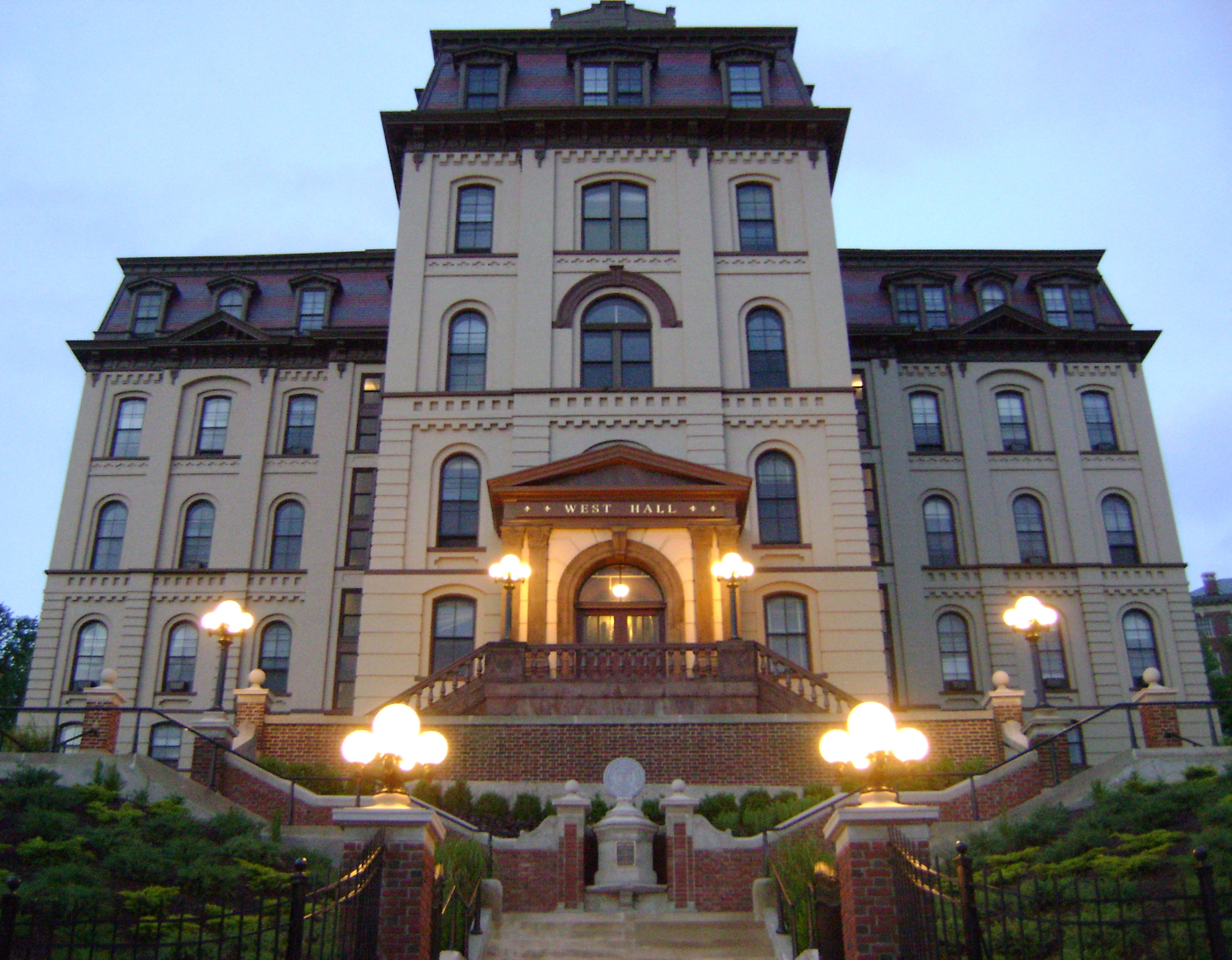
West Hall at twilight, June, 2009

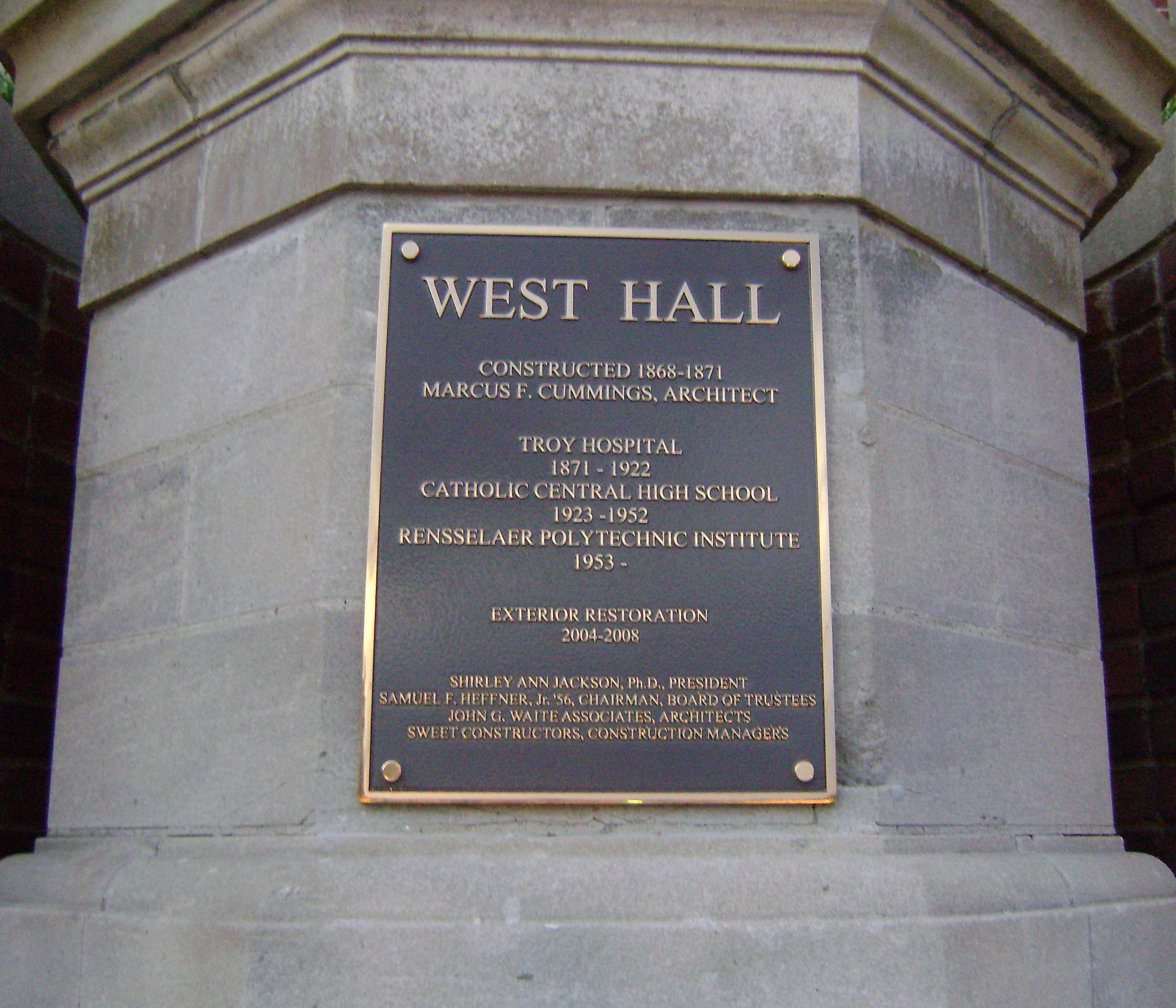
Descriptive plaque on front steps

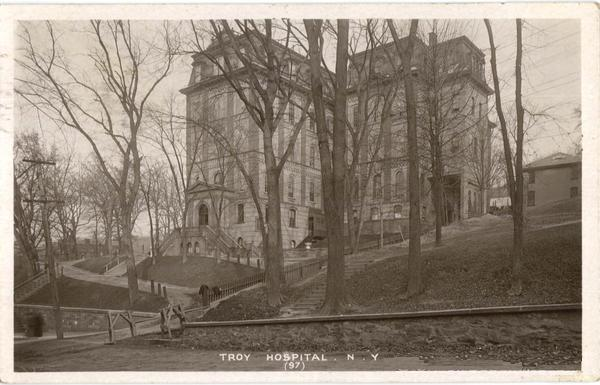
Postcard of Troy Hospital from 1913
