= Luis Exposito =

American baseball player (born 1987)

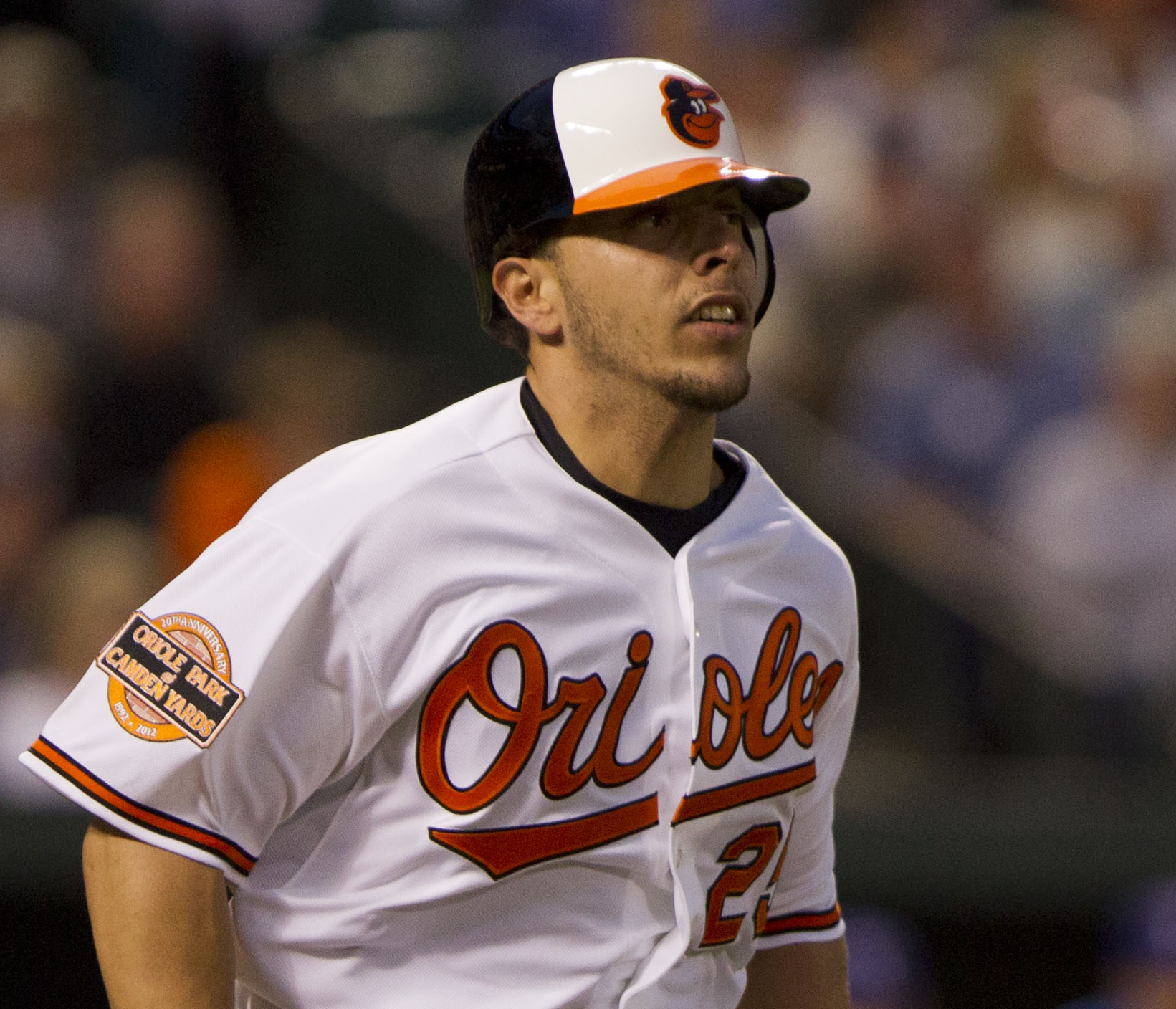
- Exposito with the Baltimore Orioles
- Catcher
- Born: January 20, 1987 (age 39); Hialeah, Florida, U.S.
- Batted: Right Threw: Right

MLB debut
- May 4, 2012, for the Baltimore Orioles

Last appearance
- September 9, 2012, for the Baltimore Orioles

MLB statistics
- Batting average: .056
- Home runs: 0
- Runs batted in: 0
- Stats at Baseball Reference

Teams
- Baltimore Orioles (2012)

Luis Exposito (born January 20, 1987) is an American former professional baseball catcher. He played in Major League Baseball (MLB) for the Baltimore Orioles in 2012.

== Career ==
=== Boston Red Sox ===
Exposito was drafted by the Red Sox in the 31st round (948th overall) of the 2005 Major League Baseball draft. He made his professional debut in 2006 with the Low-A Lowell Spinners, hitting .250 with one home runs and 23 RBI over 57 games. Exposito played in only seven games for the Single-A Greenville Drive in 2007, missing most of the campaign after being suspended for disciplinary reasons.

Exposito split the 2009 campaign between the High-A Salem Red Sox and Double-A Portland Sea Dogs, slashing a combined .287/.339/.439 with nine home runs, 57 RBI, and four stolen bases across 99 total appearances. In 2010, Exposito made 125 appearances for Double-A Portland, batting .260/.339/.416 with 11 home runs and a team-high 94 RBI.

On June 8, 2011, Exposito was called up to the Red Sox as insurance after starting catcher Jarrod Saltalamacchia became ill; he filled the roster spot of Bobby Jenks, who was placed on the disabled list. Exposito was optioned to Pawtucket two days later without appearing in a game, briefly becoming a phantom ballplayer.

=== Baltimore Orioles ===
On April 17, 2012, Exposito was claimed off waivers by the Baltimore Orioles; to make room for Exposito on the 40-man roster, the Orioles designated infielder Josh Bell for assignment. On May 4, Exposito was promoted to the major leagues after Nolan Reimold was placed on the disabled list with a herniated disc. In nine games for the Orioles during his rookie campaign, Exposito went 1-for-18 (.056) with three walks.

On April 28, 2013, the Orioles recalled Exposito to their active roster after Taylor Teagarden was placed on the disabled list. However, he did not appear for the team, and was designated for assignment following the acquisition of Chris Snyder on April 30. Exposito cleared waivers and was sent outright to the Triple-A Norfolk Tides on May 4. In 55 appearances for the Tides, he batted .268/.326/.420 with six home runs and 23 RBI; he also played in five games for the rookie-level Gulf Coast League Orioles. Exposito elected free agency following the season on November 4.

=== Detroit Tigers ===
On January 9, 2014, Exposito signed a minor league contract with the Detroit Tigers. In 29 appearances for the Triple–A Toledo Mud Hens, he slashed .177/.252/.313 with three home runs and 10 RBI. Exposito was released by the Tigers organization on June 11.

=== Oakland Athletics ===
On June 25, 2014, Exposito signed a minor league contract with the Oakland Athletics. In 19 games for the Triple–A Sacramento River Cats, he hit .303/.410/.394 with two RBI. On August 3, Exposito was released by the Athletics organization.

=== Bridgeport Bluefish ===
Exposito signed with the Bridgeport Bluefish of the Atlantic League of Professional Baseball for the 2016 season, but instead announced his retirement on April 8, 2016.
