= Joe Mahoney =

American baseball player (born 1987)

- First baseman
- Born: February 1, 1987 (age 38); Albany, New York, U.S.
- Batted: Left Threw: Left

MLB debut
- July 7, 2012, for the Baltimore Orioles

Last MLB appearance
- April 27, 2013, for the Miami Marlins

MLB statistics
- Batting average: .242
- Home runs: 1
- Runs batted in: 4
- Stats at Baseball Reference

Teams
- Baltimore Orioles (2012); Miami Marlins (2013)

Joseph Edward Mahoney (born February 1, 1987) is an American former professional baseball first baseman. He played in Major League Baseball (MLB) from 2012 to 2013 for the Baltimore Orioles and Miami Marlins.

== College career ==
Mahoney attended Catholic Central High School in Troy, New York and the University of Richmond. While with Richmond in 2005, he hit .268 with nine home runs and 41 RBI. In 2006, he hit .356 with five home runs and 49 RBI. After the 2006 season, he played collegiate summer baseball with the Orleans Cardinals of the Cape Cod Baseball League. In 2007, his final year at Richmond, he hit .305 with 17 home runs, 62 RBI and 16 stolen bases. In 2004, he took Amsterdam Rams pitcher Kyle Cetnar deep over the center field wall for a mammoth home run blast. This is still considered one of the longest home runs in Big 10 history and school history at CCHS.

== Professional career ==
=== Baltimore Orioles ===
Mahoney was drafted by the Baltimore Orioles in the sixth round, with the 189th overall selection, of the 2007 Major League Baseball draft.

With the Low-A Aberdeen IronBirds in 2007, Mahoney hit .269 with nine home runs and 44 RBI in 65 games. The following year, with the Single-A Delmarva Shorebirds, Mahoney hit .222 with seven home runs and 61 RBI in 95 games. In 2009, Mahoney played for the Shorebirds and High-A Frederick Keys, hitting a combined .278 with eight home runs, 58 RBI and 29 stolen bases. He played for the Keys and Double-A Bowie Baysox in 2010, hitting .307 with 18 home runs, 78 RBI and 13 stolen bases. He won the Orioles 2010 Brooks Robinson Minor League Player of the Year Award.

=== Miami Marlins ===
Mahoney was claimed off waivers by the Miami Marlins on November 30, 2012. In 9 games for the Marlins, he went 8-for-29 (.276) with 1 home run and 4 RBI. On October 4, 2013, Mahoney was removed from the 40-man roster and sent outright to the Triple-A New Orleans Zephyrs. He elected free agency following the season on November 4.
