= Jason Hammel =

American baseball player (born 1982)

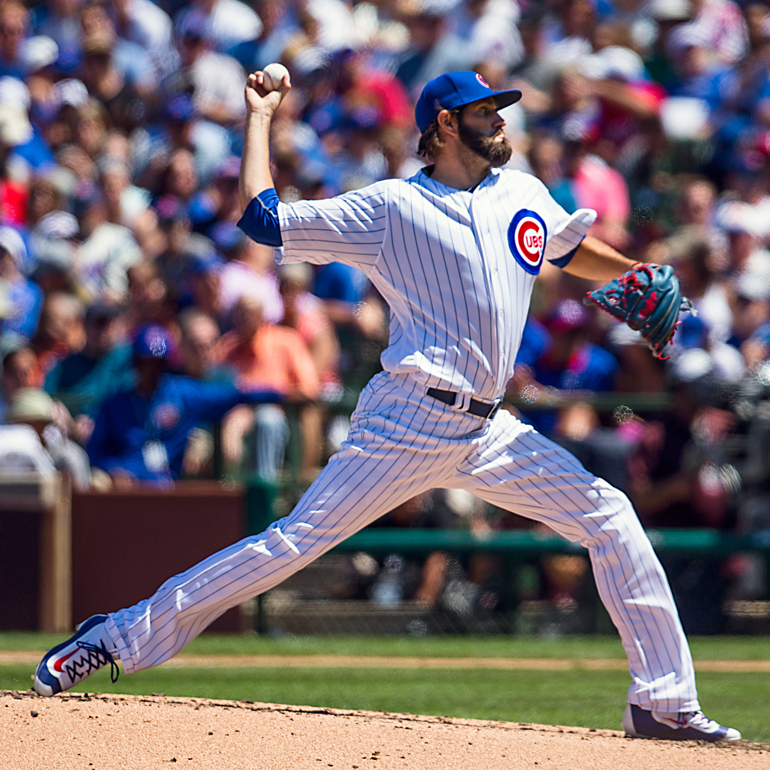
- Hammel with the Chicago Cubs
- Pitcher
- Born: September 2, 1982 (age 44); Greenville, South Carolina, U.S.
- Batted: Right Threw: Right

MLB debut
- April 11, 2006, for the Tampa Bay Devil Rays

Last MLB appearance
- September 27, 2018, for the Kansas City Royals

MLB statistics
- Win–loss record: 96–114
- Earned run average: 4.62
- Strikeouts: 1,428
- Stats at Baseball Reference

Teams
- Tampa Bay Devil Rays / Rays (2006–2008); Colorado Rockies (2009–2011); Baltimore Orioles (2012–2013); Chicago Cubs (2014); Oakland Athletics (2014); Chicago Cubs (2015–2016); Kansas City Royals (2017–2018)

Jason Aaron Hammel (born September 2, 1982) is an American former professional baseball pitcher. He played in Major League Baseball (MLB) for the Tampa Bay Devil Rays/Rays, Colorado Rockies, Baltimore Orioles, Oakland Athletics, Chicago Cubs, and Kansas City Royals.

== Amateur career ==
Hammel was born in Greenville, South Carolina, but raised in Port Orchard, Washington. He attended South Kitsap High School in Port Orchard, Washington, and led the team to a 20–1 season in 2000 as the number one starter in the rotation. Hammel was drafted in the 23rd round by the Seattle Mariners, but opted instead to attend Treasure Valley Community College in Ontario, Oregon. He played collegiate summer league ball for the Wenatchee AppleSox of the West Coast League.

== Professional career ==
=== Tampa Bay Devil Rays/Rays (2006–2008) ===
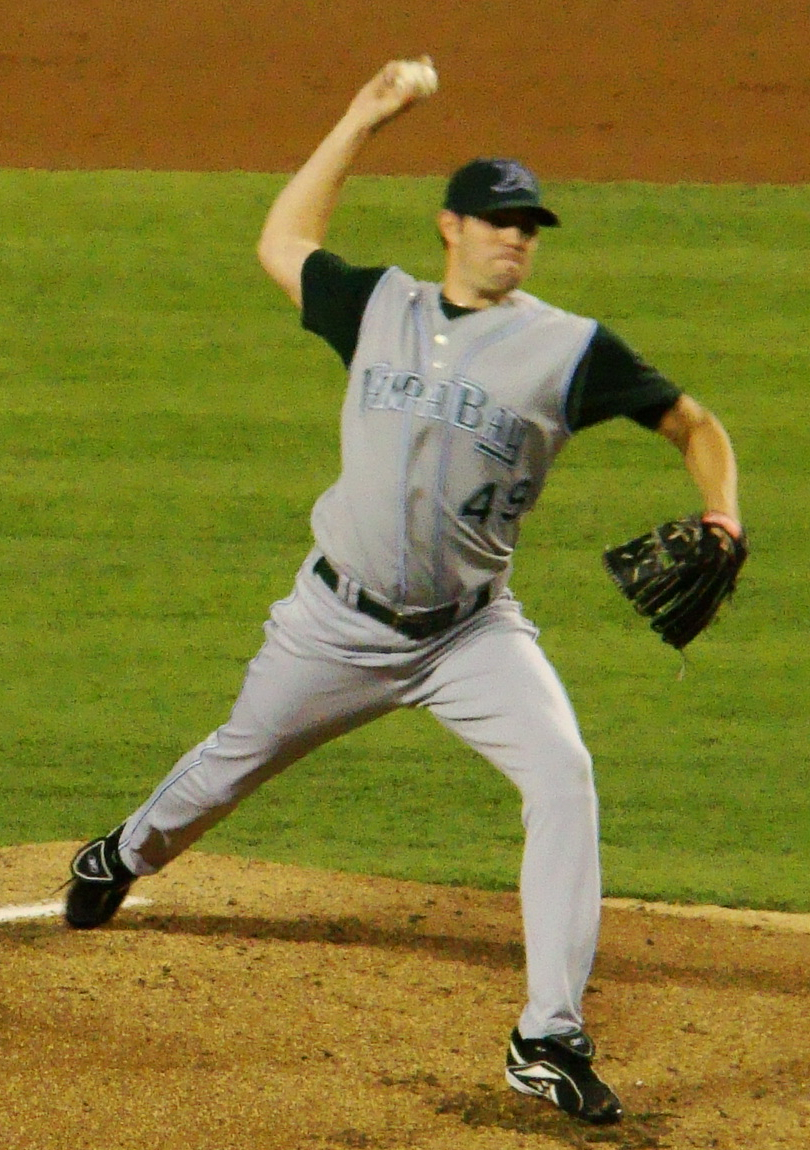
Hammel pitching for the Tampa Bay Devil Rays in 2007

The Tampa Bay Devil Rays selected Hammel in the 10th round of the 2002 MLB draft. He made his major league debut on April 11, 2006, against the Baltimore Orioles and got his first victory as a starter on September 2, 2007, against the New York Yankees. On July 17, 2006, while with the Durham Bulls, he threw 8 1/3 innings of a combined no hitter on July 17, 2006 with Juan Salas getting the final two outs, beating the Columbus Clippers 4-1.

=== Colorado Rockies (2009–2011) ===
On April 5, 2009, the Rays traded Hammel to the Colorado Rockies for pitching prospect Aneury Rodríguez. On October 11, 2009, Hammel started game three of the 2009 National League Division Series against the Philadelphia Phillies. Though he looked strong initially, he ended up allowing four earned runs and the Rockies went on to lose the game.

Hammel agreed to a two-year contract with the Rockies before the 2011 season.

=== Baltimore Orioles (2012–2013) ===
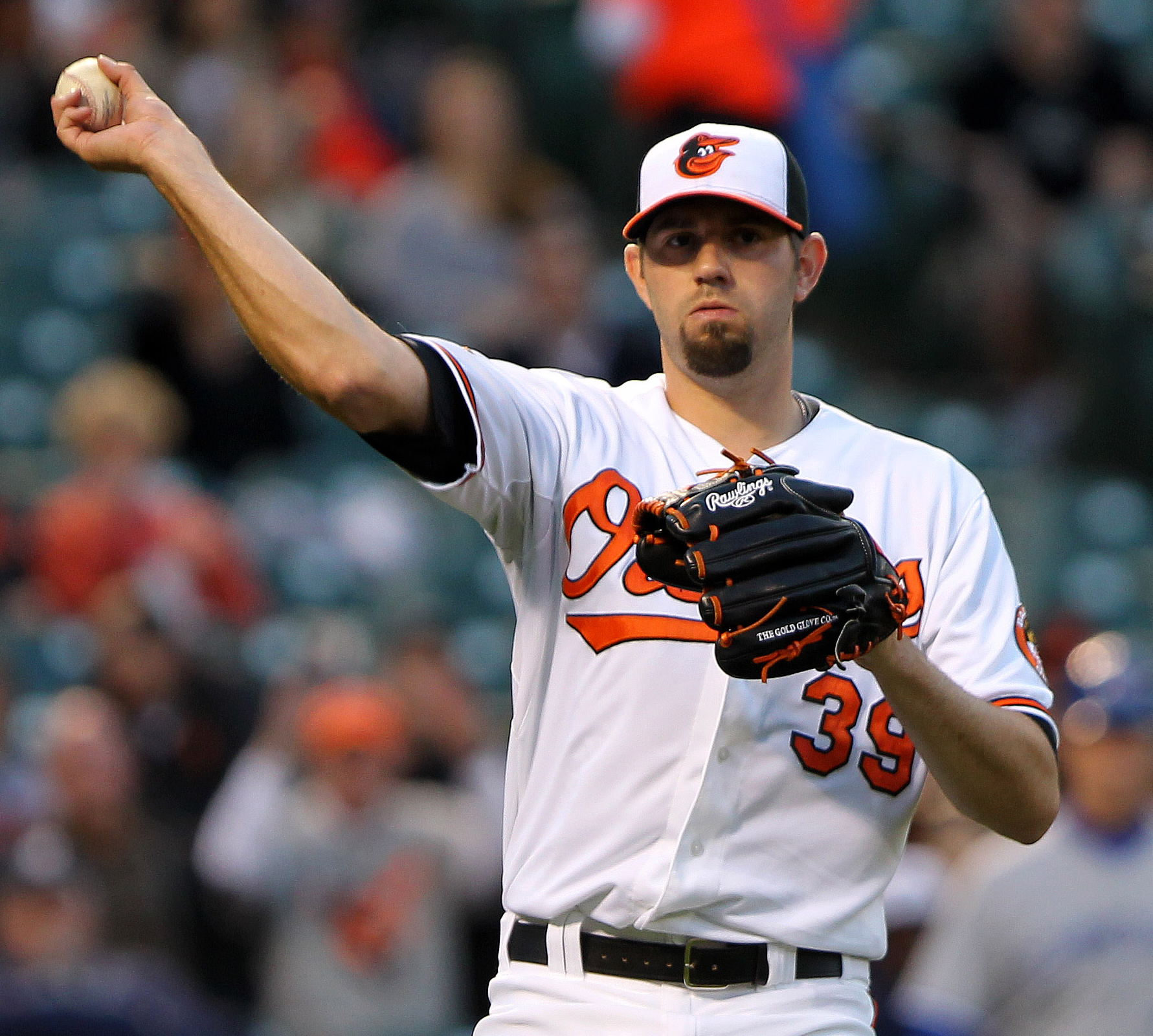
Hammel playing for the Baltimore Orioles in 2012

The Rockies traded Hammel to the Baltimore Orioles, along with pitcher Matt Lindstrom, for pitcher Jeremy Guthrie on February 6, 2012. In his Orioles debut, he took a no-hit bid into the 8th inning, with the Orioles eventually winning, 3–1, over the Minnesota Twins.

On June 16, 2012, Hammel led the Orioles to a 5–0 victory over the Atlanta Braves, holding the Braves to one hit over nine innings. It was the first complete game shutout of his career and the first complete game by an Orioles pitcher in the 2012 season.

On July 15, 2012, Hammel was placed on the 15-day disabled list to have a right knee surgery.

Hammel started for the Orioles on Opening Day in 2013.

On June 1, 2013, during a game against the Tigers, Hammel was ejected for the first time in his career, by home plate umpire Hunter Wendelstedt. Hammel had given up three consecutive home runs and his next pitch hit Matt Tuiasosopo in the shoulder with a slider.

=== Chicago Cubs (2014) ===
On January 31, 2014, Hammel signed a one-year, $6 million contract with the Chicago Cubs. Before being traded, he compiled an 8–5 win–loss record to go with a 2.98 ERA and 104 SO.

=== Oakland Athletics (2014) ===
On July 4, 2014, the Cubs traded Hammel, along with pitcher Jeff Samardzija, to the Oakland Athletics in exchange for top shortstop prospect Addison Russell, pitcher Dan Straily, outfielder Billy McKinney, and a player to be named later. After the trade with the A's, he recorded a 4.26 ERA and a 2–6 win–loss record.

=== Return to Cubs (2015–2016) ===
On December 8, 2014, after becoming a free agent following the end of the 2014 season, Hammel agreed to terms on a two-year, $20 million deal to return to the Chicago Cubs. Hammel finished the 2015 season with a 10–7 record and a 3.74 ERA. He had the highest line drive percentage allowed (24.5%) of all major league pitchers. In game four of the 2015 National League Division Series vs. the St. Louis Cardinals, Hammel was the starting pitcher and pitched only 3 innings allowing three hits, two runs, one home run, and walked three batters with a no decision in the Cubs' 6–4 win over the Cardinals. Hammel also was the starting pitcher in game four of the 2015 National League Championship Series vs. the New York Mets. He only pitched 1 1/3 innings, allowing four hits, five runs, two home runs, and walked two batters with the loss in the Cubs' 8–3 loss against the Mets.

Hammel finished the first half of the 2016 MLB season with a solid 7–5 record and a 3.46 ERA. Hammel finished the season with a 15–10 record and a 3.83 ERA. Although he was not included on the Cubs' postseason roster, Hammel received his first World Series ring.

On November 5, 2016, the Cubs declined Hammel's option for 2017 and he became a free agent.

=== Kansas City Royals (2017–2018) ===
On February 8, 2017, Hammel signed a two-year, $16 million contract with the Kansas City Royals. The contract includes a mutual option for the 2019 season. In his first season in Kansas City, Hammel struggled throughout the season, posting a record of 8-13 with a career worst 5.29 ERA in 180 1/3 innings.

Hammel began the 2018 season in the rotation but posted an ERA of 6.15 in 18 starts and was demoted to the bullpen. Overall, in 39 appearances with 18 starts, Hammel finished the season with a 6.02 ERA and a record of 4-14 in 127 innings.

On October 30, 2018, the Royals declined his 2019 option, making him a free agent.

=== Texas Rangers (2019) ===
On February 1, 2019, Hammel signed a minor-league contract with the Texas Rangers. On March 22, 2019, the Texas Rangers announced that Hammel had made the opening day roster.

=== Retirement ===
On March 23, 2019, Hammel announced his retirement from baseball.

== Pitching style ==
Hammel throws a mix of five pitches: a four-seam fastball at 92–95 mph, a two-seam fastball (his lead pitch) at the same speed, a slider in the mid 80s, a curveball in the upper 70s, and a changeup in the high 80s. He uses all of his pitches against left-handed hitters, but eliminates the changeup against right-handers. His chief off-speed pitch with 2 strikes is the slider.

Prior to the 2012 season Hammel relied mostly on the four-seamer, slider, and curve. In 2012, he shifted to a sinker/slider focus, with the other pitches playing less of a role.

All of his pitches except the changeup produced above-average whiff rates in 2012, leading to a career-high K/9 rate of 8.6

== Personal life ==
Hammel met Elissa Nichols in 2006 and they married in 2009. Together they have a son and a daughter. They resided in the Lake View neighborhood of Chicago but sold the home in 2021 and moved to the Northeastern United States.

== See also ==
- List of Colorado Rockies team records
