= Burrows (surname) =

Burrows is an English surname, and may refer to:

- Abe Burrows (1910–1985), American humorist and author
- Adrian Burrows (born 1959), former English footballer
- Alex Burrows (born 1981), Canadian ice hockey player
- Amanda Burrows, Canadian politician
- Andrew Burrows, Lord Burrows (born 1957), a Justice of the Supreme Court of the United Kingdom
- Andy Burrows (born 1979), British musician
- Arthur Burrows (radio broadcaster), British broadcaster
- Arthur Burrows (English cricketer) (1865–1890), English cricketer
- Arthur Burrows (Australian cricketer) (1903–1984), Australian cricketer
- Arthur Burrows (footballer) (1919–2005), English footballer
- Billy Drago, born William Eugene Burrows Jr. (1945–2019), American actor
- Bernard Burrows (1910–2002), British diplomat
- Charlotte Burrows, American lawyer; chair of the Equal Employment Opportunity Commission (EEOC)
- Craig Burrows (born 1972), Australian rules footballer
- Daniel Burrows (1766–1858), US Representative from Connecticut
- David Burrows (disambiguation) several people
- Darren E. Burrows (born 1966), American actor
- Don Burrows (1926–2020), Australian jazz and swing musician
- Edward Burrows (1917–1988), American pacifist
- Edwin G. Burrows (1943–2018), American professor of history
- Elizabeth Burrows, American politician
- Elsie M. Burrows (1913–1986), English botanist
- Eva Burrows (1929–2015), the 13th General of The Salvation Army
- Faith Burrows (1904–1997), American cartoonist
- Frank Burrows (1944–2021), Scottish football manager and former player
- Frederick Burrows (Australian soldier) (1897–1973), Australian soldier
- George Burrows (disambiguation) several people
- Harry Burrows (1941–2026), former English footballer
- Herbert Burrows (1845–1922), British social activist
- Horace Burrows (1910–1969), English footballer
- Jacen Burrows (born 1972), American comic book artist
- James Burrows (1940–2026), American television director
- James Burrows (actor) (born 1991), American actor
- Jeff Burrows (born 1968), Canadian drummer
- Jim Burrows (soldier) (1904–1991), New Zealand military leader, teacher, sportsman, and administrator
- John Burrows (disambiguation) several people
- Jon Burrows, Northern Ireland politician
- Jonathan Burrows, English choreographer
- Joseph Henry Burrows (1840–1914), US Representative from Missouri
- Julius C. Burrows (1837–1915), US Representative from Michigan
- Katie Burrows (born 1982), American basketball coach
- Larry Burrows (1926–1971), English photojournalist
- Latham A. Burrows (1792–1855), New York politician
- Leonard Burrows (1857–1940), English bishop
- Lorenzo Burrows (1805–1885), American merchant banker and politician
- Malandra Burrows (born 1965), English actress
- Malcolm Burrows (1943–2026), British zoologist
- Marc Burrows (1978–2009), English footballer
- Michael Burrows (disambiguation) several people
- Montagu Burrows (1775–1848), British Army Lieutenant-General
- Montagu Burrows (1819–1905), English naval officer and Oxford professor
- Montagu Brocas Burrows (1894–1967), British Army officer
- Pat Burrows, New Zealand rugby league player
- Patrick Burrows (born 1959), Canadian ice hockey player
- Phil Burrows (born 1980), New Zealand field hockey player
- Philip N. Burrows (born 1964), University o Oxford physicist, CERN Scientific policy chair
- Randall K. Burrows, American politician
- Robert Burrows (1871–1943), English cricketer
- Roger Burrows (1945–2025), South African politician
- Roland Burrows (1882–1952), judge and legal writer
- Ronald Burrows (1867–1920), British academic
- Saffron Burrows (born 1972), English American actress
- Sir Frederick John Burrows (1887–1973), British politician
- Sir Robert Abraham Burrows, KBE, British businessman and Liberal Party politician
- Stephen Montagu Burrows (1856–1935), British civil servant in Ceylon
- Stephen Burrows, American film actor and director
- Stuart Burrows (1933–2025), Welsh operatic tenor
- Terry Burrows, English author and musician
- Terry Burrows (baseball) (born 1968), American baseball player
- Theodore Arthur Burrows (1857–1929), Canadian politician
- Tom Burrows (born 1985), English cricketer with Hampshire
- Tom Burrows (footballer) (1886–?), English goalkeeper with Southampton
- Tony Burrows (born 1942), British session singer
- Vinie Burrows (1924–2023), American Broadway actress
- Warren Booth Burrows (1877–1952), US Federal judge
- Wilf Burrows (1902–1985), English professional footballer
- William Ward Burrows I (1758–1805), US Navy second Commandant
- William Ward Burrows II (1785–1813), US Navy officer
- Winfrid Burrows (1858–1929), English Anglican bishop

Fictional characters

- Lacey Burrows, character on Corner Gas
- Lincoln "L. J." Burrows Jr., character on Prison Break
- The Burrows family, the central characters of the Tunnels series of novels

== See also ==
- Burrows baronets
- Burroughs (surname)
- Burrow (surname)
- Burrowes (surname)
