= J. Burrows =

J. Burrows may refer to:

- J. Burrows (cricketer), played in Australia in the 1870s
- J. Burrows, a house brand of Officeworks

== See also ==
- Burrows (surname)
- Burroughs (surname)
- Burrowes (surname)
