= Arthur Burrows =

Arthur Burrows may refer to:

- Arthur Burrows (radio broadcaster), early employee of the British Broadcasting Company
- Arthur Burrows (footballer) (born 1919), former English footballer
- Arthur Burrows (English cricketer) (1865–1890), English cricketer
- Arthur Burrows (Australian cricketer) (1903–1984), Australian cricketer
