= George Burrows =

George Burrows may refer to:

- George Man Burrows (1771–1846), English physician
- Sir George Burrows, 1st Baronet (1801–1887), English physician
- George Burrows (Indian Army officer) (1827–1917)
- George B. Burrows (1832–1909), Wisconsin state senator
- George Burrows (swimmer) (1910–1987), Canadian swimmer
- George Burrows (cricketer) (born 1998), English cricketer

== See also ==
- George Burroughs (1650s–1692), executed in Salem witch trials
- George Burrough (1907–1965), English cricketer
- Burrows (surname)
