= Holy Saviour's Cathedral (Beijing) =

Former Anglican cathedral in China

Coordinates: 39.90079°N 116.36203°E

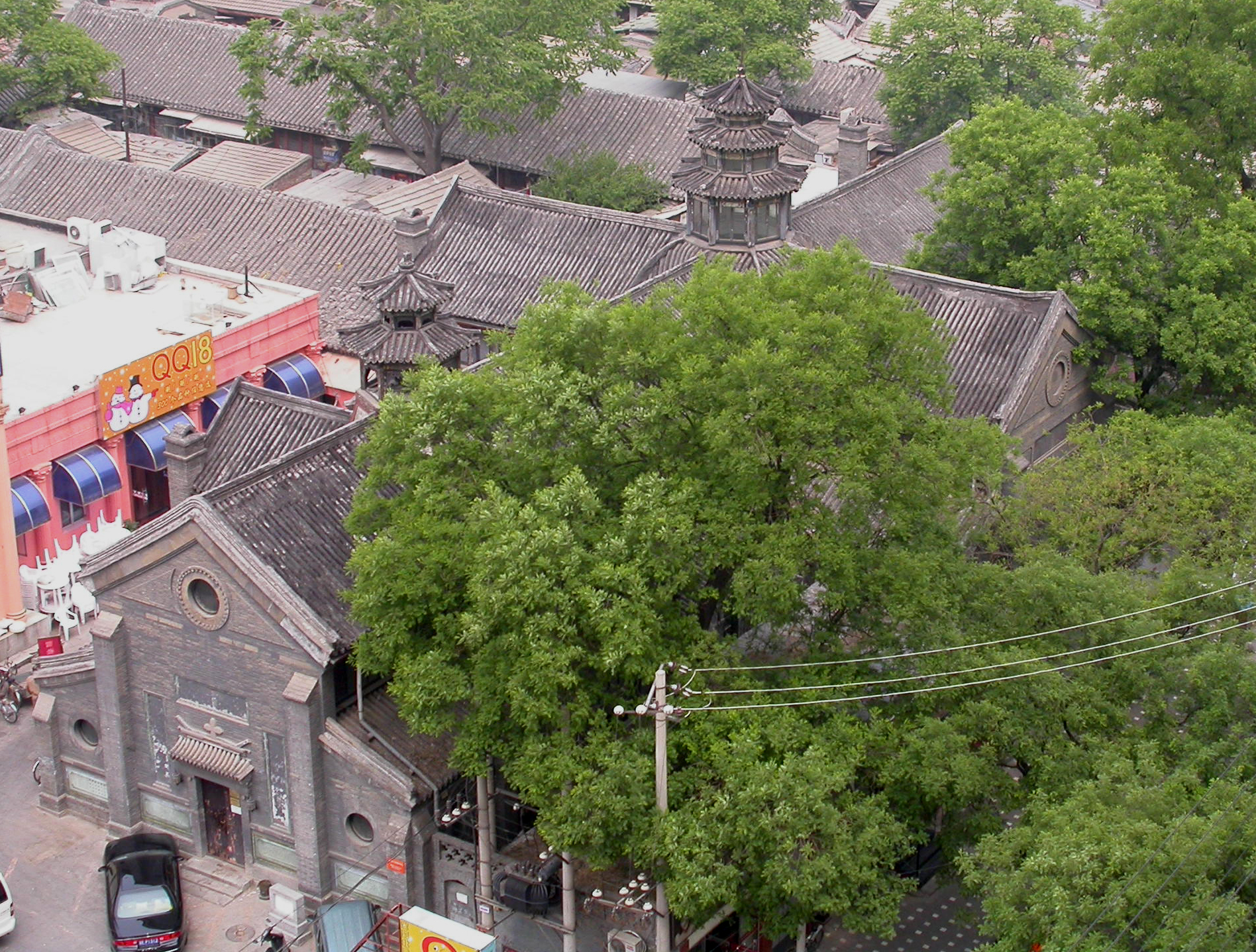
Holy Saviour's Cathedral

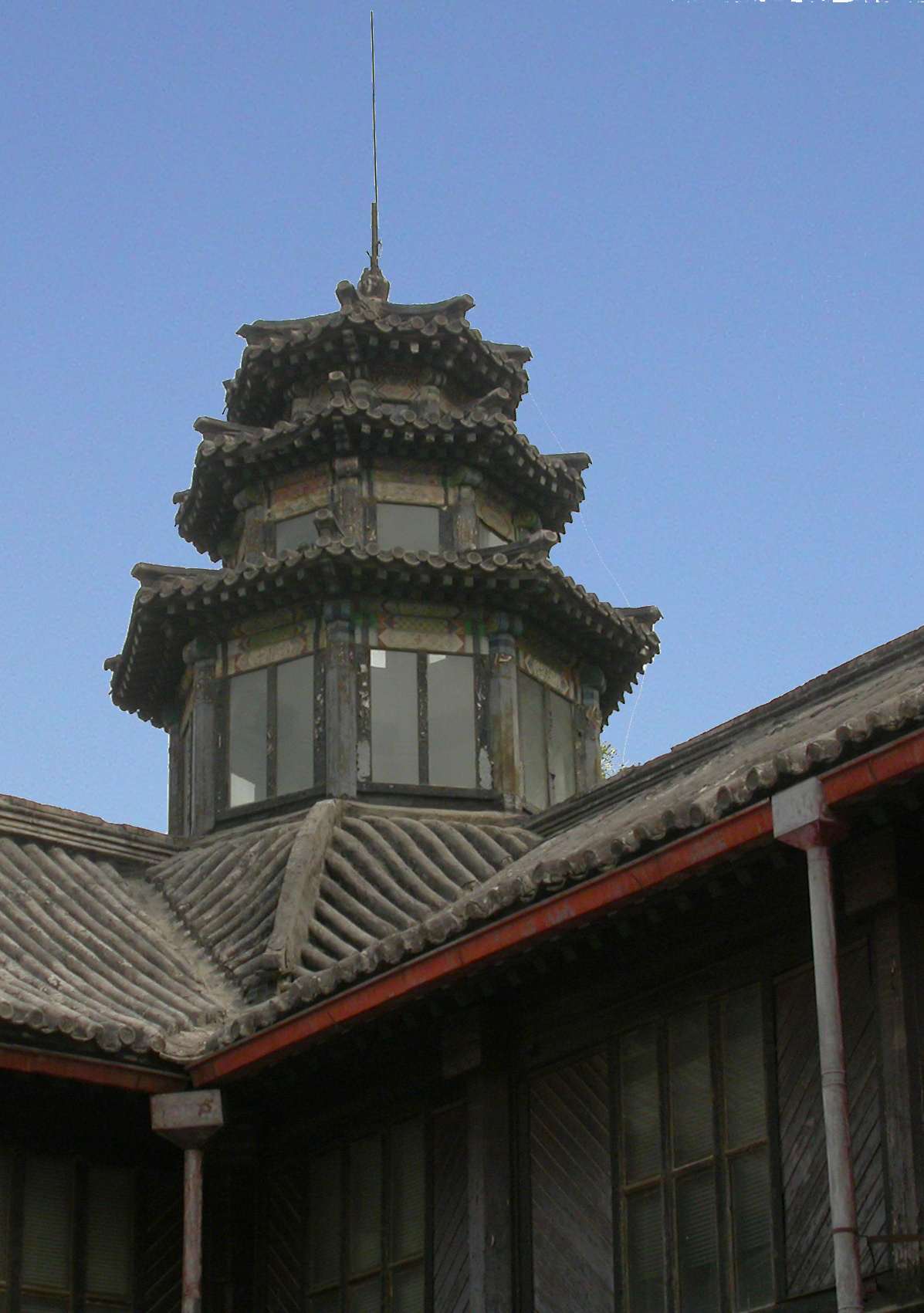
The cathedral's spire, built in the manner of a pagoda.

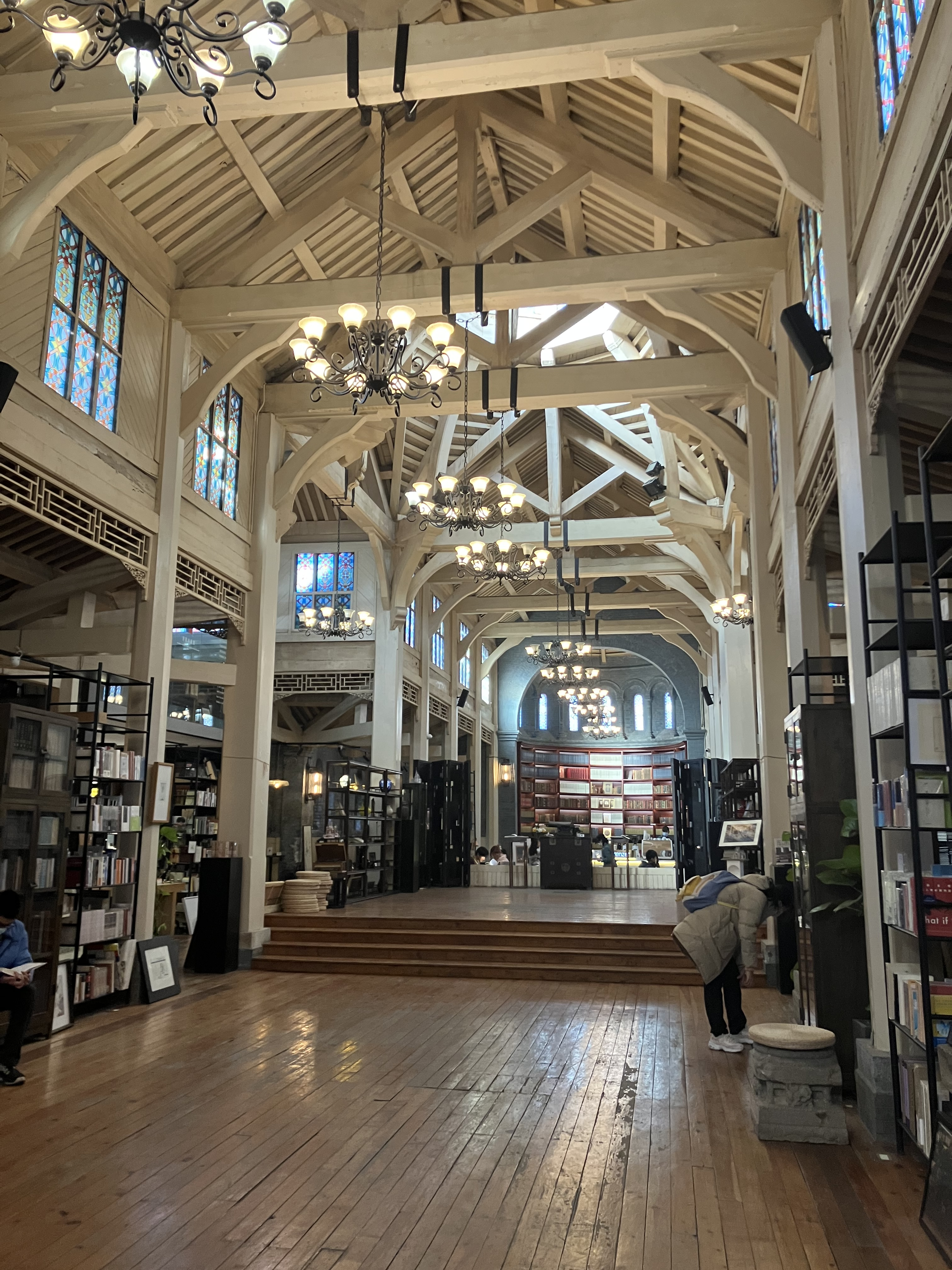
Beijing's Mofan Bookstore

Holy Saviour's Cathedral is a former Anglican cathedral in Xicheng District of Beijing, China.

== History ==
English evangelism started in Beijing in 1862 with the arrival of missionaries John Shaw Burdon and Samuel Isaac Schereschewsky. In 1880, the Diocese of North China was founded to serve the city's growing Anglican population. The property on which the cathedral is situated was originally owned by Ying Keting, an official who worked in the Criminal Department of the Qing Dynasty. Charles Perry Scott, Bishop of the Diocese of North China, purchased with the intention to build a Cathedral for the burgeoning Diocese. The church was built in 1907, and is the oldest surviving Anglican church in Northern China. It was the seat of the Diocese of North China. Anglican worship at the cathedral ended following the Communist takeover in 1949. The building fell into disrepair, but was restored in 1990 by the Saiweng Information and Consulting Center. In 2003, the building was listed as a Beijing Cultural Protection Site. In 2019, the building was converted to a branch of Beijing's Mofan Bookstore.

== Structure ==
Architecturally, the cathedral is cruciform, with the north–south axis laid out as a basilica. Other structural aspects, such as the aisles, are also built in a typically European fashion. However, many of the interior and exterior features are Chinese in style, with the whole building being built with typical grey bricks and Chinese roof shingles that blend with the area's Hutong architecture. The cathedral's bell tower, situated above the crossing, is built in the manner of a pagoda. The cathedral's entrance is also built in the Chinese style, with blessings inscribed. Several memorials to past clergymen are present inside. The cathedral's interior is furnished in the Chinese style, with wooden walls and a trussed timber roof in blonde wood.
