= Montagu Burrows (British Army officer) =

British army officer (1775–1848)

Lieutenant-General Montagu Burrows (18 June 1775 – 23 February 1848) was a British Army infantry officer who served in the West Indies, Ireland, the Netherlands, Malta, Spain, Italy, France, the Ionian Islands, and Gibraltar.

== Early life ==
Born in Middlesex, Burrows was the second son of John Burrows and his wife Maria Smith. When they were married at St George's, Bloomsbury, in 1762, his father was recorded as John Burrows, Clerk, Batchelor of Laws, and by 1775 was Rector of St Clement Danes, Westminster, and Hadley, Middlesex. In 1775 he was also employed by Elizabeth Montagu as tutor to her nephew Matthew Robinson Montagu, having been introduced to her by Hester Chapone, of Hadley, a friend of his sisters. Born in June 1775, Montagu Burrows was christened into the Church of England on 21 July 1775 at St Mary's Church, Hadley, and was named after Elizabeth Montagu, who is reported to have become his godmother. He was educated at Merchant Taylors' School in the City of London. John Burrows died in 1786, and his Will makes it clear that his marriage to Maria Smith had brought him an estate at Sydenham in Oxfordshire.

== Career ==
On 31 January 1793, the young Burrows was commissioned as an ensign into the 29th Foot. In September 1795, he transferred as a captain to the 14th Foot, in which he served for twenty-one years, and from 1798 to 1802 was on the staff of George Prevost on the island of Saint Lucia, returning from there as a major. In 1806 he served in Ireland and from 1807 to 1808 in British India, but was sent home from the Bengal Presidency of India following a severe illness. He made that return voyage on the Diana, which narrowly escaped shipwreck in a storm, losing all her masts. Burrows was a major of his regiment's second battalion in the Scheldt expedition, but saw little other active service during the Peninsular War, as to his regret he was posted as a lieutenant-colonel in command of his battalion to defend Malta. He travelled to see Lord Wellington, seeking a more active posting, and found him shortly before the Battle of Salamanca. He took part in a skirmish near there on 22 July 1812, but was sent back to Malta, where he was still in post when the plague arrived in 1813. In 1814, he was at Genoa, and in 1815 at Marseille, where he commanded a division of the Army of Occupation, following the departure of Sir Hudson Lowe, who on 1 August 1815 was appointed as custodian of Napoleon and Governor of Saint Helena. In 1816, Burrows commanded his battalion in the new British protectorate of the United States of the Ionian Islands. The next year, he was again in Malta, and returned home. When his battalion was reduced, he transferred to the 64th Foot at Gibraltar. On 10 January 1837, he was promoted to Major-General and brevet General.

== Private life ==
Burrows married three times. Firstly, on 8 October 1804, at St Pancras Old Church, while living at Hadley, Fanny Elizabeth Barrett. She died on 27 June 1805. Secondly, in Malta, in 1811, he married Mary Anne Larcom (1794–1832), not long after the bride's father, Captain Joseph Larcom RN, had been posted there as Naval Commissioner. With his second wife, who died in 1832, he had six sons, including Henry William (1816–1892), a clergyman, Arthur George (1818–1883), a Royal Artillery major general, Montagu (1819–1905), a naval officer and historian, Leonard Francis (1821–1907), a clergyman and master at Rugby School, and Edward Hollis (1826–1888), of the Ceylon Civil Service.

When his fourth son Leonard Francis was born on 4 July 1821, it was at Hadley.

Lastly, on 20 August 1834, at Petersham, Burrows married Eliza Catherine Bradshaw. She died in 1838.

Burrows's last residence was at Anglesey, Alverstoke. He died on 23 February 1848 and was buried there on 29 February.

== Descendants ==
Burrows's first son, Henry William, was the father of Colonel Edmund Augustine Burrows CMG CBE JP of the Manor House, Long Crendon, the father of Edmund William Montague Burrows, killed in action with the Royal Artillery in France on 26 August 1916. Henry William's daughter Hilda Elizabeth Larcome Burrows (1867–1893) in November 1892 married the Rev. Walter Allan Moberly, Vicar of Sydenham, son of George Moberly, Bishop of Salisbury. She died in November 1893.

Burrows's third son, also called Montagu Burrows, was a naval officer and professor at the University of Oxford. He married Mary Anna, a daughter of Sir James Whalley-Smythe-Gardiner, and had three sons, Edward Henry (1851), who became H. M. Inspector of Schools, Stephen Montagu (1856), of the Ceylon Civil Service, and Alfred (1860), and one daughter, Frances Emily (1853) who in 1889 married Charles Perry Scott, Bishop of North China.

Lieutenant General Montagu Brocas Burrows (1894–1967) was a son of Stephen Montagu Burrows. He married Molly Le Bas, a notable sculptor.

Burrows's fourth son, the Rev. Leonard Francis Burrows, a housemaster at Rugby School, was the father of Leonard Hedley Burrows (1857–1940), the first Bishop of Sheffield, who was the father of Hedley Burrows (1887–1983), Dean of Hereford, and grandfather of Simon Hedley Burrows (1928–2015), Bishop of Buckingham. Leonard Hedley Burrows had a younger brother, Ronald Montagu Burrows (1867–1920), archaeologist and Principal of King's College London.
