= Phil Burrows =

Phil Burrows may refer to:

- Phil Burrows (field hockey) (born 1980), New Zealand field hockey player
- Phil Burrows (footballer) (born 1946), English footballer
- Philip N. Burrows (born 1964), English physicist
