= All Saints' Church, Tianjin =

- Anglican Church
- 諸聖堂
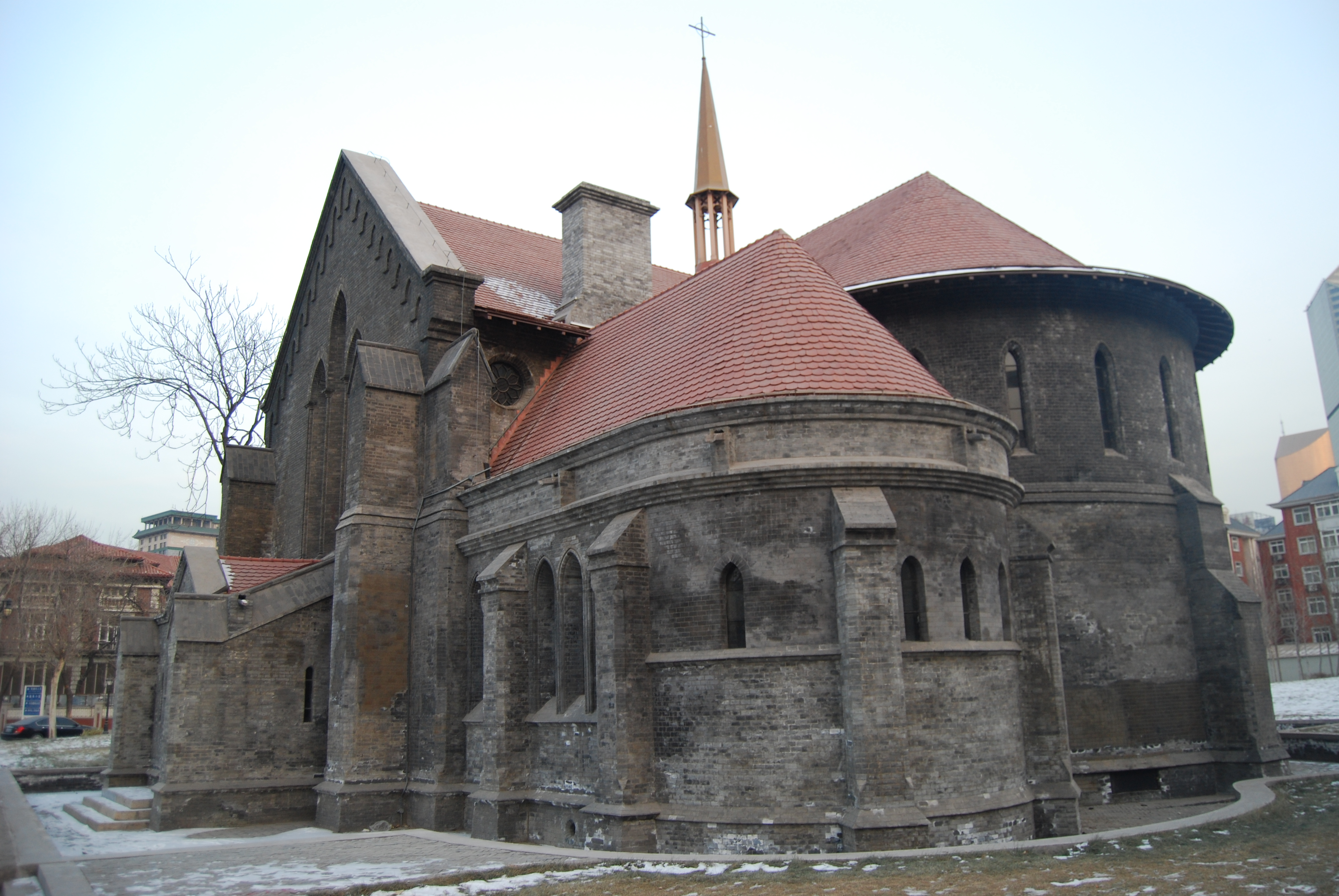
- Side view of All Saints'
- All Saints' Church, Tianjin
- 39.11759°N 117.2074°E
- Location: 2 Zhejiang Road, Heping District, Tianjin
- Country: China
- Denomination: Church of England

History
- Founded: 1893
- Dedication: All Saints

Architecture
- Functional status: Redundant
- Architectural type: Church
- Style: Neo-Gothic, Norman
- Groundbreaking: 1900
- Completed: 1903

Administration
- Diocese: North China

All Saints' Church (traditional Chinese: 諸聖堂; simplified Chinese: 诸圣堂; pinyin: Zhūshèng táng; Wade–Giles: Chu^{1}-shêng^{4} tʻang^{2}), also known as the Episcopal Church of Tianjin or, simply the Anglican Church (Chinese: 安里甘教堂; pinyin: Ānlǐgān jiàotáng; Wade–Giles: An^{1}-li^{3}-kan^{1} chiao^{4}-tʽang^{2}), is a small, redundant Anglican church on Race Course Road (today's Zhejiang Road), in the former British concession of the city of Tianjin, north China.

== History ==
In 1893, for building an English church in the concession, the British Municipal Council of Tianjin gave to the Church a marshland near the junction of Meadours Road and Race Course Road. Being capable of holding only 60 people, the church had soon become too small due to the increase in British migration.

The first stone of a new church was laid in 1900, but construction was suspended due to the Boxer Rebellion. After the insurrection subsided in 1901, construction had been resumed under the supervision of Charles Scott, the then missionary bishop of the Diocese of North China, and completed in 1903.

The church was destroyed by a fire in 1935 and was replaced by the present church in the next year. It was built in the fusion of neo-Gothic and Norman architectural styles, covering an area of 1200 square metres, and capable of holding around 300 people.

The church was occupied by a factory during the sociopolitical purge movement of Cultural Revolution (1966–1976). In 2009, All Saints' was restored to its original appearance, however, it is no longer open to the public, visitors are only allowed to appreciate the building from outside.

== Appearances in films ==
In the 2009 film City of Life and Death, a scene of recruiting comfort girls was filmed in the church; and a number of interior scenes of the 2014 film Outcast, were also shot inside of the church.

== Gallery ==
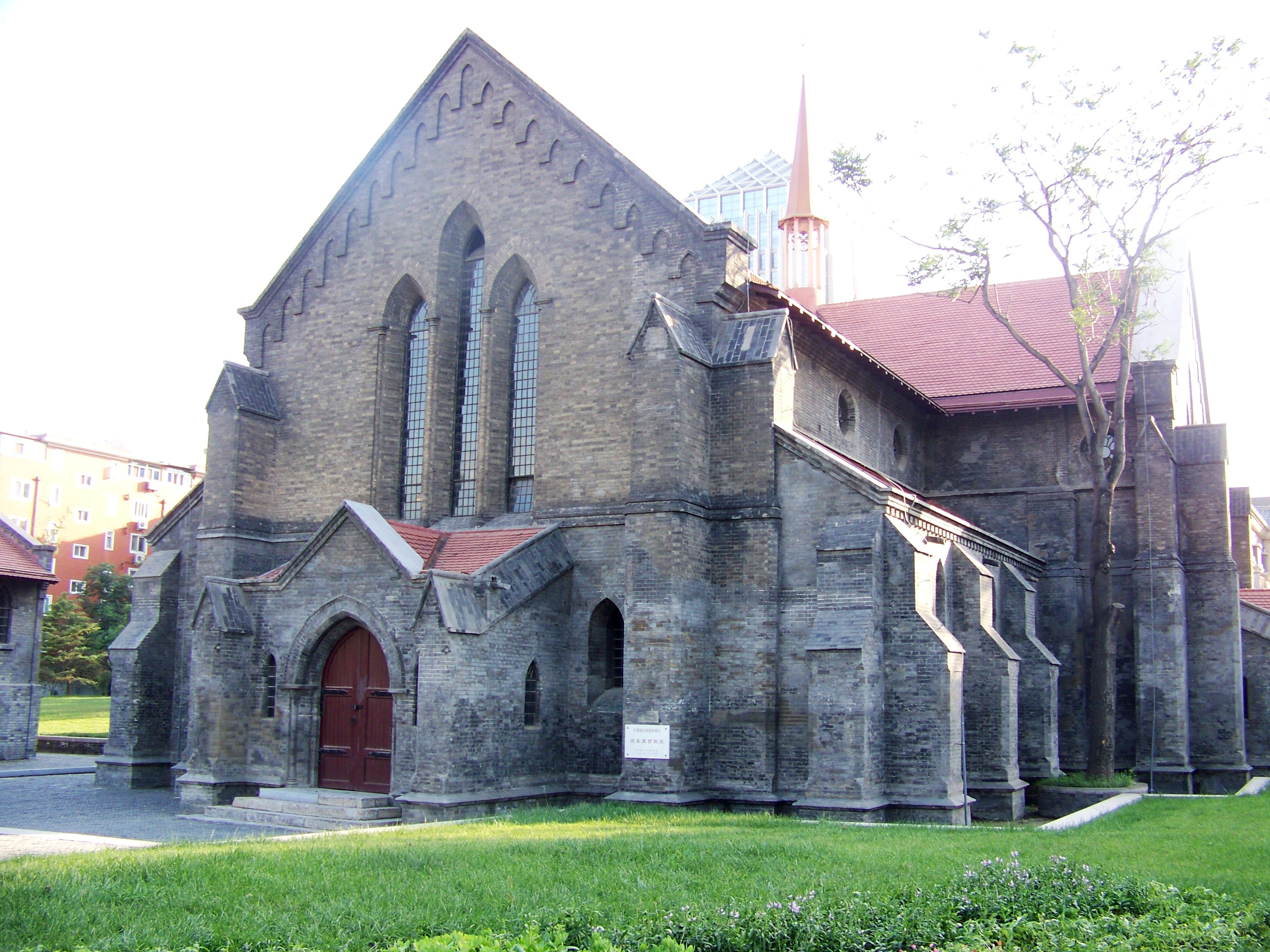
Front view of the church

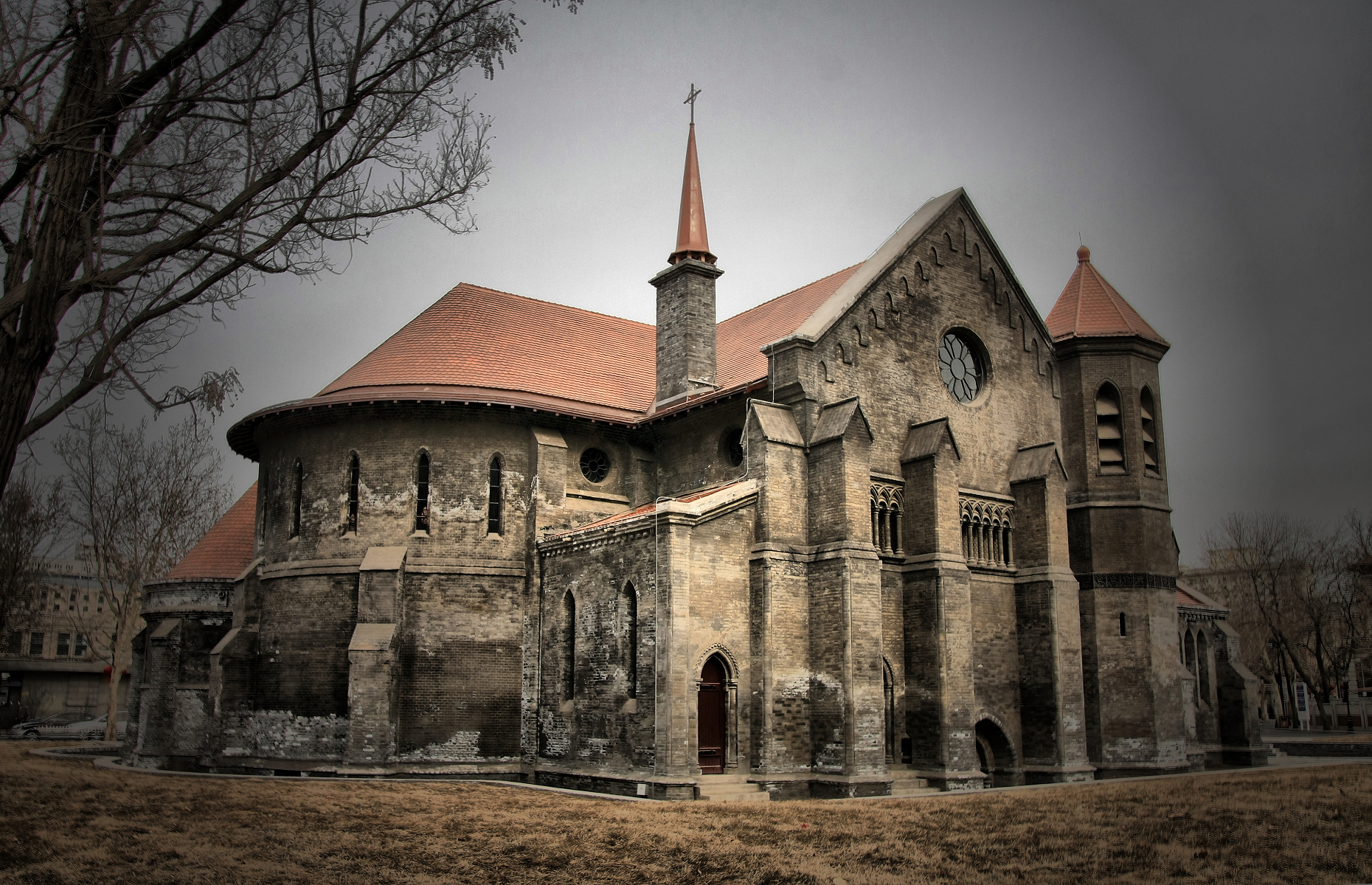
Rear view of the church

== See also ==
- Anglican Church in China
