= Burrowes =

Burrowes is a surname. Notable people with the name include:

- David Burrowes (born 1969), British politician
- Brian Burrowes (1896–1963), bishop in the Scottish Episcopal Church
- Norma Burrowes (born 1944), Irish coloratura soprano
- Patricia Burrowes (born 1961), American herpetologist
- Peter Burrowes (1753–1841), Irish barrister and politician
- Robert Burrowes (disambiguation), several people
- Thomas Burrowes (disambiguation), several people
- Tim Burrowes, founder of Mumbrella magazine and website
- Wesley Burrowes (1930–2015), Irish playwright and screenwriter

== See also ==
- Burroughs (surname)
- Burrow (surname)
- Burrows (surname)
