= Parker baronets of Bassingbourn (1783) =

Escutcheon of the Parker baronets of Bassingbourn

The Parker baronetcy, of Bassingbourn in the County of Essex, was created in the Baronetage of Great Britain on 13 January 1783 for Sir Peter Parker, a naval officer of the American Revolutionary War in action at the Battle of Sullivan's Island in 1776. He was subsequently Member of Parliament for Seaford and Maldon.

The 2nd Baronet was killed in action ahead of the Battle of Baltimore in 1814. The 5th Baronet was an Admiral in the Royal Navy. The title became extinct on his death in 1869.

== Parker baronets, of Bassingbourn (1783) ==
- Sir Peter Parker, 1st Baronet (1721–1811)
- Sir Peter Parker, 2nd Baronet (1785–1814)
- Sir Peter Parker, 3rd Baronet (1809–1835)
- Sir John Edmund George Parker, 4th Baronet (1788–1835)
- Sir Charles Christopher Parker, 5th Baronet (1792–1869)

== Notes ==
Baronetage of Great Britain
Preceded by Geary baronets	Parker baronets of Bassingbourn; 13 January 1783	Succeeded by Whalley-Gardiner baronets
