= Gascon Rolls =

The Gascon Rolls, also known as the Vascon Rolls (Latin: Rotuli Vasconiae or Vasconie), are records from the English government of Aquitaine, Gascony, and other French domains, running from to 1273 to 1468. Containing grants of land, oaths of treaties, and other important documents, the rolls were originally stored in the Tower of London and Oxford's Bodleian Library before the start of their publication in the late 19th century.

== Contents ==
The rolls are records of the Court of Chancery concerning Aquitaine and are mainly dated from Bordeaux. "Aquitaine" and "Gascony" were used at the time to vaguely refer to the English possessions in France, even when it included more territory than this and even after Gascony proper had fallen to the French. Dated from 1242 to 1468, the rolls contain records of grants of land, rent charges, the granting of liberties, copies of treaties, and contracts of marriage. The records were initially stored in the Tower of London and Oxford's Bodleian Library, with abstracts available at the College of Arms. In the 1840s, they were moved to the Public Record Office (now The National Archives).

The rolls are considered highly important by historians. Montagu Burrows commented that they "possess an unrivalled variety and importance. They are a rich and inexhaustible store of materials for the general history of the two countries and the biography of the persons they notice. Not even the humblest class of the society of the times fails to find a place... they constitute a well-spring of the first order for the history of English administration".

== Publication ==
Some of the material from the rolls was included in Thomas Rymer's 1704–1735 Foedera, a compendium of medieval and early modern English treaties, and republished in its various editions and revisions. The rolls covering the years 1242–1254 were published, edited by Francisque Xavier Michel, in 1885. A supplement to this first volume, covering 1254–55, and two new volumes, covering the years 1273–1290 and 1290–1307, were published in 1896, 1900, and 1906 respectively, all edited by Charles Bémont. A fourth volume, covering the years 1307–1317, edited by Yves Renouard under the supervision of Robert Fawtier, appeared in 1962. The remaining rolls, covering the years 1317–1468, were published online in calendar form under the auspices of the Gascon Rolls Project between 2009 and 2019.
