= Robert Burrowes =

Robert Burrowes may refer to:

- Robert Burrowes (Australian politician) (1825–1893)
- Robert Burrowes (Irish politician) (1810–1881)
- Robert Burrowes (priest) (died 1841), Anglican priest in Ireland

== See also ==
- Robert Burrows (cricketer) (1871–1943), English cricketer
- Robert Burrows (politician) (1884–1964), British businessman and politician
- Bob Burrow (1934–2019), American basketball player
