= Sir William Gardiner, 1st Baronet =

Member of the Parliament of England

Sir William Gardiner 1st Baronet

Member of Parliament for Wigan
- In office 1660–1660
- Monarch: Charles II
- Succeeded by: Sir Brocas Gardiner

Personal details
- Born: May 9, 1628
- Died: June 23, 1691 Fareham, Hampshire, England
- Resting place: St. Peter and St. Paul, Fareham
- Spouse: Anne Brocas
- Children: Brocas Gardiner, Bernard Gardiner
- Parent(s): Robert Gardiner and Mary Palmer
- Occupation: Politician

Sir William Gardiner, 1st Baronet (9 May 1628 – June 1691) was an English politician who sat in the House of Commons in 1660.

Gardiner was the son of Robert Gardiner of Wigan and his wife Mary Palmer.

In 1660, Gardiner was elected Member of Parliament for Wigan in the Convention Parliament. He was made a Knight of the Bath at the coronation of King Charles II and was created Baronet of Roche Court in the same year on 2 December 1660.

Gardiner married Anne Brocas, daughter of Robert Brocas of Beaurepaire, Hampshire, and had two sons Sir Brocas Gardiner, 2nd Baronet and Bernard.

He became involved in prosecuting his wife’s claim to the Brocas estates. It was reported in 1662 that he was, 'just ready to break, his bills of exchange being all protested at Leghorn.' Presumably he went bankrupt, for he never again held even the humblest local office. He had not paid his baronet’s fee, from which he was discharged in 1686. Meanwhile he had reached a compromise over the Brocas property with the rival claimant and received a small cash payment.

He settled down in Fareham, Hampshire where he died and was buried at St. Peter and St. Paul, Fareham on 23 June 1691, aged 63. He died intestate, with his father’s legacies still unpaid, and administration was granted to a creditor.

Baronetage of England
New creation	Baronet (of Roche Court); 1660–1691	Succeeded by Brocas Gardiner
