= Shen Zaichen =

Shen Zaichen (Chinese: 沈載琛; pinyin: Shěn Zàichēn; Wade–Giles: Shên Tsai-chʽên, also romanized Sing Tsae-seng; 1861–1940) was an Anglican bishop in China.

Shen's father was the first clergyman in Zhejiang. He was educated at Trinity College, Ningbo and ordained in 1890. He was Headmaster of his old college for 29 years. He was also Archdeacon of Chekiang (Zhejiang) from 1910 to 1918. In that year he was consecrated at Holy Trinity Church, Shanghai to be an Assistant Bishop in the Diocese of North China, making him the first person of Chinese descent to be made a Bishop in the Anglican Communion.
