= Sir George Burrows, 1st Baronet =

English physician (1801–1887)

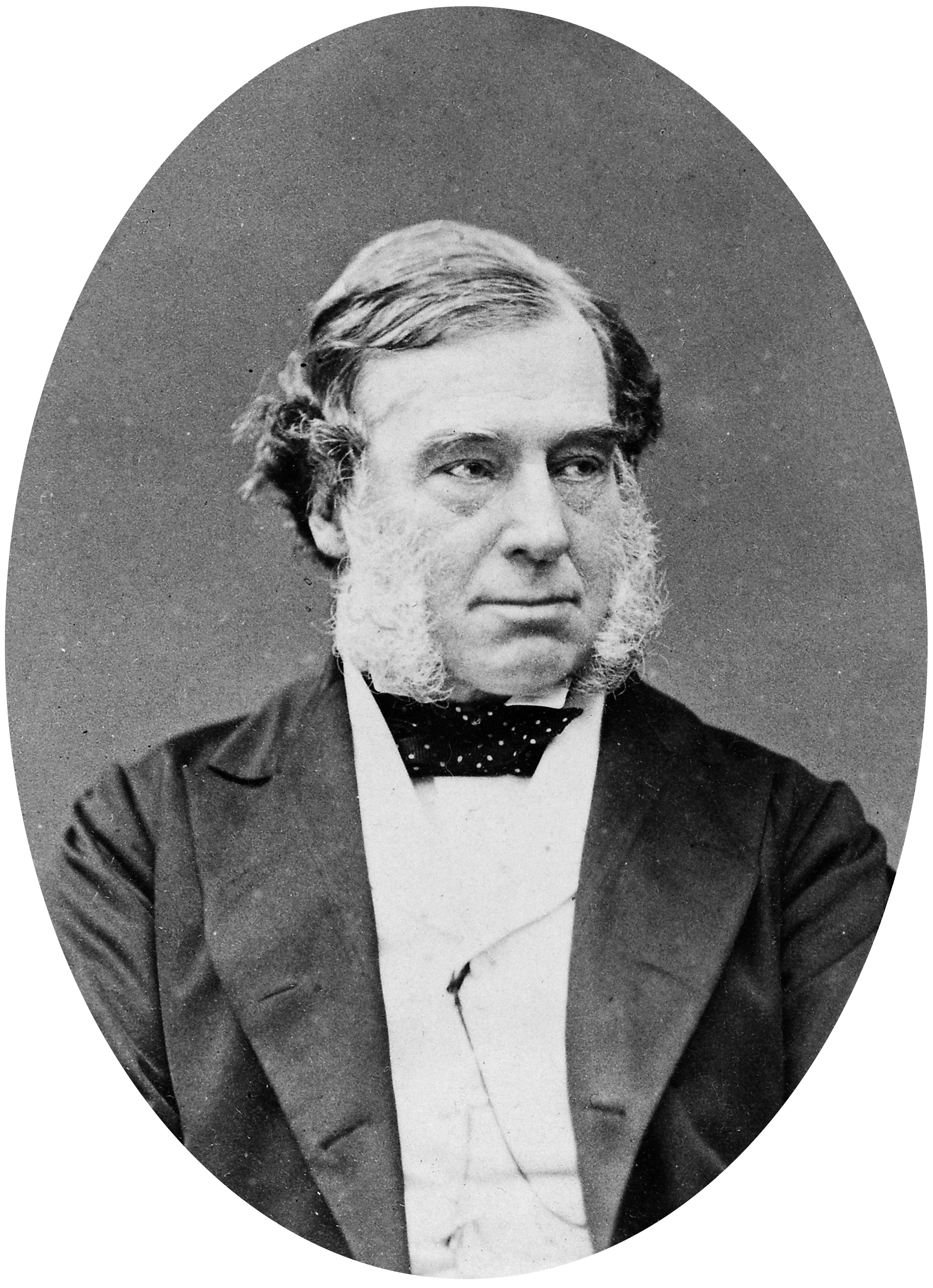
Photo of Sir George Burrows, 1st Baronet

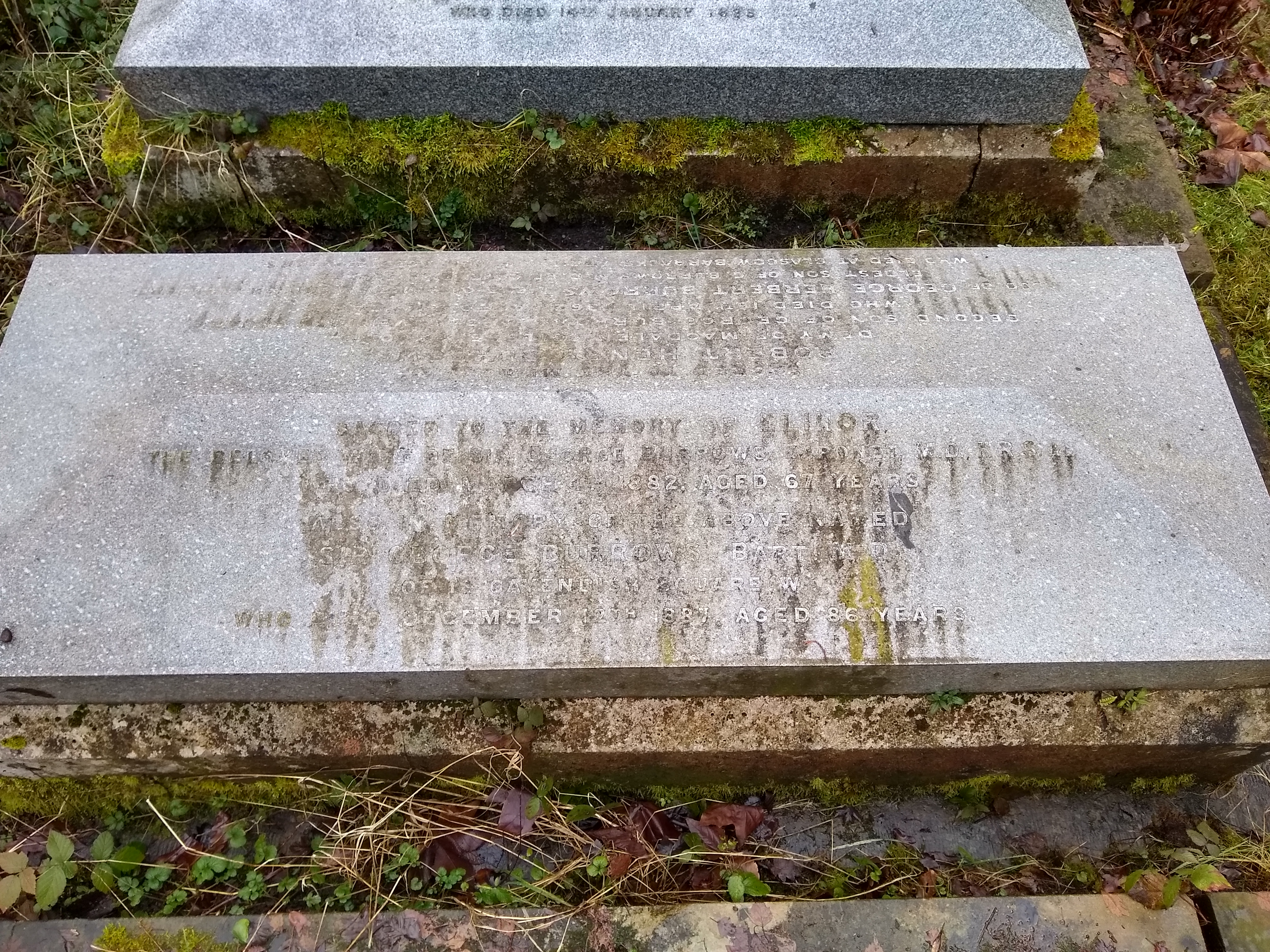
Grave of Sir George Burrows, 1st Baronet in Highgate Cemetery (west side), London

Sir George Burrows, 1st Baronet, FRS, FRCP (28 November 1801 – 12 December 1887) was an English physician and President of the Royal College of Physicians.

== Early life ==
He was born in London, the son of George Man Burrows, FRCP and his wife, Sophia Burrows (née Druce), and went to school in Ealing.

== Career ==
He studied at St Bartholomew's Hospital before going up to Caius College, Cambridge in 1820 where he was elected a fellow of his college after taking his B.A. degree in 1825. A year later he graduated as M.B. and resumed his medical studies at St. Bartholomew's. He was appointed joint lecturer on medical jurisprudence at St. Bartholomew's in 1932. In 1834 he was made assistant physician and in 1836 joint lecturer on medicine. In 1841 he was promoted to be full physician, an office which he held for twenty-two years, and became sole lecturer on medicine. He was also physician to Christ's Hospital for many years. He was appointed Physician-Extraordinary to the Queen in 1870 and Physician-in-Ordinary three years later.

He was elected a Fellow of the Royal College of Physicians in 1832 and delivered the Goulstonian Lectures in 1834, the Croonian Lecture in 1835–36 and the Lumleian Lectures in 1843–44. He was elected to serve as President of the college from 1871 to 1876. He was also President of the British Medical Association in 1862. In 1869, he was President of the Royal Medical and Chirurgical Society. He was elected as a member of the American Philosophical Society in 1873.

He wrote a book on The Disorders of the Cerebral Circulation (1846).

On 19 March 1874 he was created a baronet, of Cavendish Square, in the County of Middlesex, and of Springfield, in the Isle of Wight. They were known as Burrows baronets, but became extinct in 1917 on the death of Sir Ernest Pennington Burrows, 3rd Baronet (1851–1917).

== Personal life ==
He married Elinor Abernethy in 1834 and had eight children, of whom five predeceased him.

He died in 1887 at Cavendish Square, London, and was buried at Highgate Cemetery. His title passed to his son Frederick Abernethy Burrows.

Baronetage of the United Kingdom
New creation	Baronet (of Cavendish Square and Springfield); 1874–1887	Succeeded by Frederick Burrows
