= Diocese of North China =

Pre-1912 Anglican diocese

Diocese of North China 聖公會華北教區
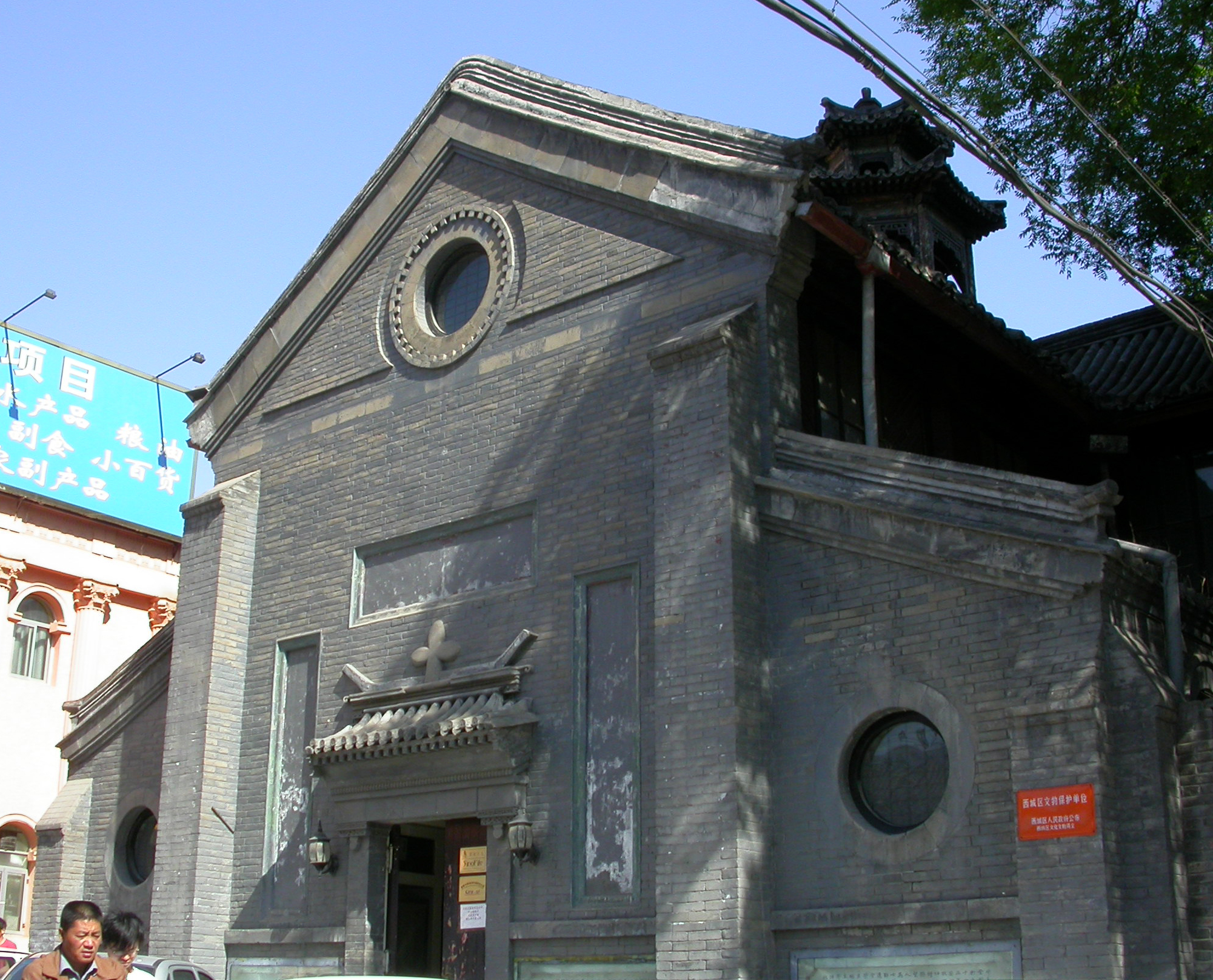
- Holy Saviour's Cathedral (Beijing)

Location
- Country: Qing and Republican China
- Territory: North China
- Ecclesiastical province: Church in China

Information
- Denomination: Anglican
- Rite: Anglican Rite
- Established: 1880
- Dissolved: c. 1958
- Cathedral: Holy Saviour's Cathedral, Peking
- Language: English, Mandarin Chinese
- Parent church: Church of England

The Diocese of North China (Chinese: 聖公會華北教區; Wade–Giles: Shêng Kung Hui Hua Pei Chiao Chʽü; lit. 'Anglican Diocese of North China'), also known as Hua Pei Diocese (華北教區), was an Anglican diocese in China established under the supervision of the Church of England. From 1875 till the establishment of the Anglican-Episcopal Province of China in 1912, the diocesan headquarters were located in the compound of Holy Trinity Church, Shanghai.

== Bishops of the Diocese ==
- 1872–1879: William Armstrong Russell, who also had some functions in the region before the creation of the diocese.
- 1880–1913: Charles Perry Scott
- 1914–1940: Francis Lushington Norris

== Assistant Bishops ==
- Tsae-seng Sing, Assistant Bishop in the Diocese 1918–1940

== See also ==
- All Saints' Church, Tianjin
- Dalian Anglican Church
- Category:Anglican dioceses in China
