= Charles Bémont =

French scholar

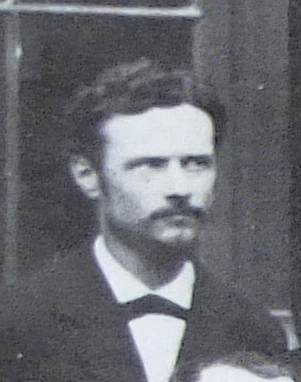
Charles Bémont

Charles Bémont (16 November 1848 – 21 September 1939), French scholar, was born in Paris.

== Life ==
In 1884 he graduated with two theses, one on Simon de Montfort translated as Simon de Montfort: Earl of Leicester, 1208-1265 (1930), without the thesis' appendices of historical documents, and La Condamnation de Jean Sansterre (Revue historique, 1886). His Les Chartes des libertés anglaises (1892) has an introduction upon the history of Magna Carta, etc., and his history of medieval Europe, written in collaboration with Gabriel Monod (1896), was translated into English, as Medieval Europe from 395 to 1270.

He was also responsible for the continuation of the Gascon Rolls, the publication of which had been begun by Francisque Xavier Michel in 1885. His supplement to Volume I was published in 1896, his Volume II in 1900, and his Volume III in 1906, bringing the published years of the rolls up to 1307. He received the honorary degree of Litt. Doc. at Oxford in 1909. He was made a corresponding member of the British Academy in 1914.

A street in Croissy-sur-Seine commemorates him.

Mathematician and historian of mathematics, Geneviève Guitel (1895–1982) was Bémont's niece.

== Works ==
- Rôles Gascons Transcrits et Publiés [Gascon Rolls, Transcribed and Published] (in French), vol. I: Supplément 1254–1255, Paris: National Printing Office, 1896.
- Rôles Gascons Transcrits et Publiés [Gascon Rolls, Transcribed and Published] (in French), vol. II: 1273–1290, Paris: National Printing Office, 1900.
- Rôles Gascons Transcrits et Publiés [Gascon Rolls, Transcribed and Published] (in French), vol. III: 1290–1307, Paris: National Printing Office, 1906.
