= Gardiner baronets =

Extinct baronetcy in the Baronetage of England

- Escutcheon of the Gardiner baronets of Roche Court
- Creation date: 1660
- Status: extinct
- Extinction date: 1779

The Gardiner Baronetcy, of Roche Court in the County of Southampton, was a title in the Baronetage of England. It was created on 24 December 1660 for Sir William Gardiner, Member of Parliament for Wigan. The second Baronet was a Commissioner of the Stamp Office from 1713 until 1739. The title became extinct on the death of the third Baronet in 1779. The late Baronet left his estates to his cousin John Whalley, of Tackley, Oxfordshire, who assumed the additional surname of Gardiner and was created a baronet, of Roche Court in the County of Southampton, in 1783. See Whalley-Smythe-Gardiner baronets for more history of this title.

== Gardiner baronets, of Roche Court (1660) ==
- Sir William Gardiner, 1st Baronet (c. 1618–1691)
- Sir Brocas Gardiner, 2nd Baronet (c. 1663–1739)
- Sir William Gardiner, 3rd Baronet (c. 1700–1779)

== See also ==
- Whalley-Smythe-Gardiner baronets
