= Bernard Gardiner =

Bernard Gardiner (baptised 25 September 1668 – 22 April 1726) was an academic at the University of Oxford, serving as Warden of All Souls College, Oxford, and also as Vice-Chancellor of Oxford University.

== Life ==
Gardiner was the son of Sir William Gardiner, 1st Baronet, a lawyer and politician, and was baptised in Fareham, Hampshire, on 25 September 1668. His mother was Anne daughter and heir Robert Brocas of Beaurepaire, Hampshire. He was educated at Magdalen College, Oxford, matriculating there in November 1684 and holding a demyship (scholarship), but lost his position during a battle for supremacy between the college's officials and James II. Gardiner obtained his Bachelor of Arts degree in 1688, and became a Fellow of All Souls College in the following year. Thomas Tenison, the Archbishop of Canterbury, nominated him to become the Warden (head) of All Souls in 1702. He later added the degrees of Bachelor of Civil Law in 1693 and Doctor of Civil Law in 1698.

Further positions within the University of Oxford followed: Keeper of the Archives from 1703, and Vice-Chancellor of the University from 1712 to 1715. Gardiner took steps to ensure that fellows of the Oxford colleges complied with their obligations to reside in Oxford and, for fellows at some colleges, to become priests. He had some, but not complete, success since some of the errant fellows had powerful supporters. Gardiner himself was ordained, and was vicar of Ambrosden, Oxfordshire, from 1708 and rector of Hawarden, Flintshire, from 1714. He helped to organise the rebuilding of All Souls by Nicholas Hawksmoor and George Clarke.

Gardiner married Grace, the daughter and eventual heir of Sir Sebastian Smythe, Kt, of Cuddeston, Oxfordshire, physician to King William III, and died on 22 April 1726 in Oxford. His estates were inherited by his daughter, also called Grace, who married Robert Whalley, MD in 1742; for whose sons see Whalley-Smythe-Gardiner baronets.

Academic offices
Preceded by Hon. Leopold William Finch	Warden of All Souls College, Oxford; 1702–1726	Succeeded by Stephen Niblett
Preceded by Thomas Brathwait	Vice-Chancellor of Oxford University; 1712–1715	Succeeded by John Baron
