= Michael Burrows =

Michael or Mike Burrows may refer to:

- Michael Burrows (computer scientist) (born 1963), British computer scientist
- Michael Burrows (artist) (fl. 2010s–2020s), Australian singer-songwriter
- Michael Burrows (bishop) (born 1961), Church of Ireland bishop
- Mike Burrows (baseball) (born 1999), American baseball pitcher
- Mike Burrows (bicycle designer) (1943–2022), English bicycle designer
