= Stephen Montagu Burrows =

British amateur historian, author and Ceylonese civil servant

Sir Stephen Montagu Burrows
- Born: 16 December 1856; Headington, Oxfordshire
- Died: 4 March 1935 (aged 78); Oxford, Oxfordshire
- Education: Eton College, Exeter College, Oxford
- Occupation: public servant
- Organization: Ceylon Civil Service
- Notable work: The Buried Cities of Ceylon : a guide book to Anuradhapura and Polonnaruwa
- Spouse: Isabella Christina Cruickshank (m. 1890)
- Children: Montagu Brocas, Agnes Mary

Sir Stephen Montagu Burrows CIE (26 December 1856 – 4 March 1935), colloquially known as Montagu Burrows, was a British amateur historian, author and Ceylonese civil servant.

Stephen Montagu Burrows was born in Headington, Oxfordshire, England on 26 December 1856, the second son of Montagu Burrows, a naval historian and professor at Oxford University, and Mary Anna née Whalley-Smythe-Gardiner, daughter of Sir James Whalley Smythe Gardiner, 3rd Baronet. His grandfather was Lieutenant-General Montagu Burrows. He studied at Eton College and Exeter College, Oxford, graduating BA in Classical Studies in 1879, promoted by seniority to MA (Oxon) in 1884.

He joined the Ceylon Civil Service in 1880 and was attached to the Kandy Kachcheri. In June 1881, he was appointed the private secretary to Lieutenant-Governor John Douglas and in November was made a Justice of the Peace (JP) and Assistant Coroner for Colombo. On 2 June 1882, he was assigned to the Queen's Advocates' Department. He was made a JP and the additional police magistrate for Galle on 25 August the same year. In 1884 he published the Visitor's Guide to Kandy and Nuwara Eliya.

He was appointed as the Assistant Government Agent in the North Central Province, and between 1884 and 1886, he was assigned the responsibility of supervising the archaeological survey of Anuradhapura and Polonnaruwa. He published a book, The Buried Cities of Ceylon in 1885. In June 1887, he was appointed as the Assistant Government Agent for Matale.

In 1890, he married Isabella Christina Cruickshank (1859–1940), at St. Peter's Church, Colombo. She was the youngest daughter of pastoralist and landowner Alexander Cruickshank, from Inverell, New South Wales, Australia and the sister of Australian politician George Cruickshank. They had a son, Montagu Brocas (born 1894) and a daughter, Agnes Mary Montagu (born 1897).

In 1892, he was made a District Judge in Kegalle, in 1893 the assistant Government Agent for Trincomalee, and in 1896 the assistant Government Agent for Nuwara Eliya.

In 1899, he was appointed the Director of Public Instruction (Director Education), an office which he held to 1902, following which he was made the Government Agent for the North Western Province. He also acted as Chief Editor of a magazine known as "The Ceylon Miscellany" which he had started for the benefit of the members of the Clerical Service during his early days, in the Colombo Kachcheri. After a fine record of twenty-six years' service in Ceylon, during which he gained a high reputation for sympathy and understanding, as well as for culture and refinement, he retired and returned to England, where he continued to take an active interest in the East and all that concerned it.

Another of Sir Montagu's literary activities, though not directly concerned with Ceylon, was the publication of the autobiography of his father, a distinguished Oxford Professor.

In 1912, he was appointed local adviser at Oxford to Indian Students, in which capacity he was able to be of great assistance to students from Ceylon. In recognition of these services, he was made a Companion of the Indian Empire in 1917, and received the honour of knighthood in 1923.

In 1922, he served as the High Sheriff of Oxfordshire for a year.

In 1928, Sir Montagu delivered a lecture before the Royal Society on The Ancient Civilisation of Ceylon, the chair being taken by another old Civil Servant, Mr. E, B. Alexander.

Burrows died on 4 March 1935 at his residence in Oxford, Oxfordshire, at the age of 79.

== Bibliography ==
- Burrows, Stephen Montagu (1884). The Visitor's Guide to Kandy and Nuwara Eliya : Containing a Topographical Description of the Towns and their Neighbourhood, a Short Historical Sketch and Various Useful Information. George J. A. Skeen.
- Burrows, Stephen Montagu (1885). The Buried Cities of Ceylon : a guide book to Anuradhapura and Polonnaruwa : with chapters on Dambulla, Kalawewa, Mihintale, and Sigiri. A. M. & J. Ferguson.
- Burrows, Stephen Montagu; Archaeological Department of Ceylon (1886). Report on Archaeological work in Anuradhapura and Polonnaruwa, 1885. Government Press.
- Burrows, Stephen Montagu (1908). Autobiography of Montagu Burrows. London: Macmillan & Company.
- Burrows, Stephen Montagu (1928). The Ancient Civilisation of Ceylon.
