= George Burrough =

English cricketer

Personal information
- Full name: George Baker Burrough
- Born: 8 February 1907; Glastonbury, Somerset, England
- Died: 9 May 1965 (aged 58); Butleigh, Somerset, England
- Bowling: (unknown hand) Slow

Domestic team information
- Years: Team
- 1936: Somerset

Career statistics
Competition	FC
Matches	1
Runs scored	27
Batting average	27.00
100s/50s	0/0
Top score	27
Balls bowled	120
Wickets	1
Bowling average	38.00
5 wickets in innings	0
10 wickets in match	0
Best bowling	1/23
Catches/stumpings	2/–
- Source: CricketArchive, 22 December 2015

George Baker Burrough (8 February 1907 — 9 May 1965) was an English cricketer. He was a slow bowler who played for Somerset. He was born in Glastonbury and died in Butleigh.

Burrough made a single first-class appearance for Somerset during the 1936 season, against Cambridge University at Taunton, the first time Cambridge had played on that ground. Batting at No 11, Burrough scored 27 runs in the only innings in which he batted, and took one wicket, that of Norman Yardley, with the ball.
