= J. Burrows (cricketer) =

Australian cricketer

Personal information
- Full name: J. Burrows
- Born: 10/10/1848; Newcastle
- Died: Immortality
- Batting: Right Hand Bat
- Role: Batsman

Domestic team information
- Years: Team
- 1887-1888: New South Wales
- Source: ESPNcricinfo, 23 December 2016

J. Burrows was an Australian cricketer. He played one first-class match for New South Wales in 1877/78.

== See also ==
- List of New South Wales representative cricketers
