= Wilf Burrows =

English footballer

Personal information
- Full name: Wilfred Burrows
- Date of birth: 16 February 1902
- Place of birth: Castleford, West Riding of Yorkshire, England
- Date of death: July 1985 (aged 83)
- Place of death: Leeds, England
- Height: 5 ft 9 1/2 in (1.77 m)
- Position: Goalkeeper

Senior career*
Years	Team	Apps	(Gls)
- Castleford Town
- Selby Town
1926–1931	Tranmere Rovers	49	(0)
1931–1933	Wrexham	28	(0)
1933–1934	York City	3	(0)
1934	Bangor City		
1934–????	Bury	0	(0)
- Colwyn Bay United
- Shrewsbury Town
Total		80	(0)
- * Club domestic league appearances and goals

Wilfred Burrows (16 February 1902 – July 1985) was an English professional footballer who played as a goalkeeper in the Football League for Tranmere Rovers, Wrexham and York City, in non-League football for Castleford Town, Selby Town, Bangor City, Colwyn Bay United and Shrewsbury Town, and was on the books of Bury without making a league appearance.
