= Edward Burrows =

Edward Flud Burrows (August 17, 1917 – December 17, 1998) was an American conscientious objector and peace activist.

was raised on a cotton farm in Sumter County, South Carolina. He completed undergraduate studies at Washington and Lee University, earned a master's degree from the University of Wisconsin–Madison, and a doctoral degree from Duke University. He later received a Rosenwald Scholarship to complete doctoral studies in history at the University of Wisconsin–Madison.

As a conscientious objector to World War II, Burrows was sent to a Quaker Friends camp in the mountains of North Carolina. Later, while in Florida, he served a prison sentence for refusing to carry a draft card. After his release from prison, he spent a year at the Race Relations Institute at Fisk University. In 1948, while completing research for the Commission on Interracial Cooperation in Atlanta, Georgia, Burrows was hired as a history teacher at Guilford College, in Greensboro, North Carolina. At Guilford, he was active in promoting integration, especially as a member of the Faculty Forum, an interracial organization with membership from local colleges. As a professor, he was one of the first winners of the Excellence in Teaching Award presented by the Guilford College Board of Visitors.

Following his retirement in 1979, Burrows participated in an organization promoting fairness in the investigation of the November 3, 1979, Nazi–Klan shootout at an anti-Klan rally held by the Communist Workers Party. His autobiography, Flud: One Southerner's Story, was published in 1989. Burrows died on December 17, 1998, at the age of 81 years.
