= Michael Burrows (artist) =

Australian singer, songwriter

- Origin: Melbourne, Victoria, Australia
- Genres: Folk, Rock, Pop rock, Soft Rock
- Years active: 2015–present
- Labels: Independent
- Website: www.michaelburrowsmusic.com

Michael Burrows is an Australian singer and songwriter from Melbourne, Victoria.

Burrows' demos were first discovered by Neil Finn (Crowded House and Fleetwood Mac) through Medicine Mondiale, an Auckland-based social enterprise. Soon after, Finn recorded the vocals for two of Burrows' songs at Roundhead Studios in Auckland, New Zealand.

In 2015, Burrows was handpicked by Martha Wainwright to open for her sold-out acoustic tour in Australia, despite not having any music officially released.

From there, Burrows started working with Grammy Award winning songwriter Frank Myers, fellow Grammy Award winner, Steve Marcantonio and former musical director for Faith Hill and Reba McEntire, Jimmy Nichols. With the talented and experienced professionals, Burrows recorded a few tracks at the legendary Ocean Way Studios in Nashville and released his debut single "Please Don’t Cry" on 27 April 2018. The song peaked at No. 17 on the MPE Rock Stream Charts and No. 11 on the Download Charts. In September 2018, Burrows released his second single "Turn This Love Around." The song debuted at No. 39 on Australia's iTunes Store, No. 2 on the iTunes Rock Chart, and No. 14 on Australian Independent Record Labels Association's singles chart.

In January 2019, "Turn This Love Around" made its U.S. premiere on Atwood Magazine and landed on Billboard's Adult Contemporary chart for 10 weeks, reaching its peak at No. 24. The single's success carried over to his following single "Brightest Star," which peaked on the same chart at No. 25. Both singles became part of Burrows' debut EP Turn This Love Around, which was released in June. And both garnered Grammy consideration for 2019. In 2020, Burrows released the single Brand New Heartache, co-written by Lior Attar and Simon Starr, performing it live as soon as COVID restrictions were restricted. The song received extensive radio play in Australia, also crossing over to country radio across all of the major networks.

Burrows’ music strikes a mix of folk rock, Americana and pop and has been compared to some of his greatest influences including The Beatles, Eagles, Wilco, America, and Dawes .

== Discography ==
Singles

- "Please Don't Cry" (2018)
- "Turn This Love Around" (2018)
- "Brightest Star" (2019)

EP

- Turn This Love Around (2019)
