= Arthur Burrows (English cricketer) =

English cricketer

Arthur Dixon Burrows (2 July 1865 – 6 February 1890) was an English cricketer. He was a right-handed batsman and a right-arm medium-fast bowler who played for Nottinghamshire. He was born in Awsworth and died in Eastwood.

Burrows made a single first-class appearance, in 1887, against Marylebone Cricket Club. Batting in the lower order, he scored a single run in each of the innings in which he batted.

Burrows died at the age of just 24, less than three years after his only game. His brother, Robert, played for Worcestershire between 1899 and 1919.
