= Thomas Burrowes =

Thomas Burrowes may refer to:

- Thomas Burrowes (artist) (1796–1866), artist known for his watercolours of 19th century Ontario
- Thomas Henry Burrowes (1805–1871), fourth president of the Pennsylvania State University
