= Burrows baronets =

Extinct baronetcy in the Baronetage of the United Kingdom

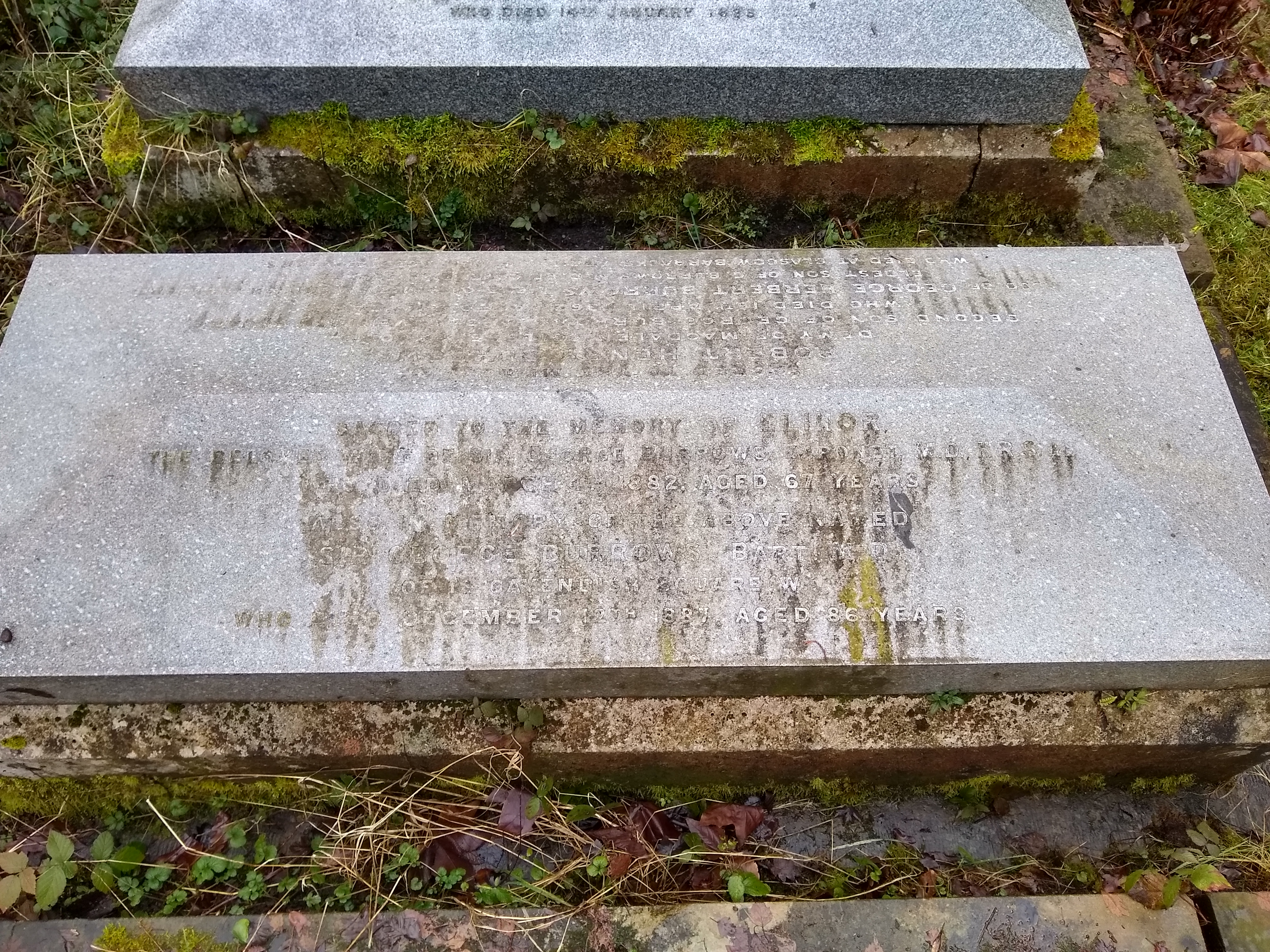
Grave of Sir George Burrows, 1st Baronet, in Highgate Cemetery (west side)

The Burrows Baronetcy, of Cavendish Square in the County of Middlesex and of Springfield in the Isle of Wight, was created in the Baronetage of the United Kingdom on 19 March 1874 for Sir George Burrows of London, physician and President of the Royal College of Physicians.

The baronetcy became extinct in 1917 on the death of the 3rd Baronet.

== Burrows of Cavendish Square and Springfield ==
- Sir George Burrows, 1st Baronet (1801–1887)
- Sir Frederick Abernethy Burrows, 2nd Baronet (1846–1904)
- Sir Ernest Pennington Burrows, 3rd Baronet (1851–1917)
