= Montagu Burrows =

British historian (1819–1905)

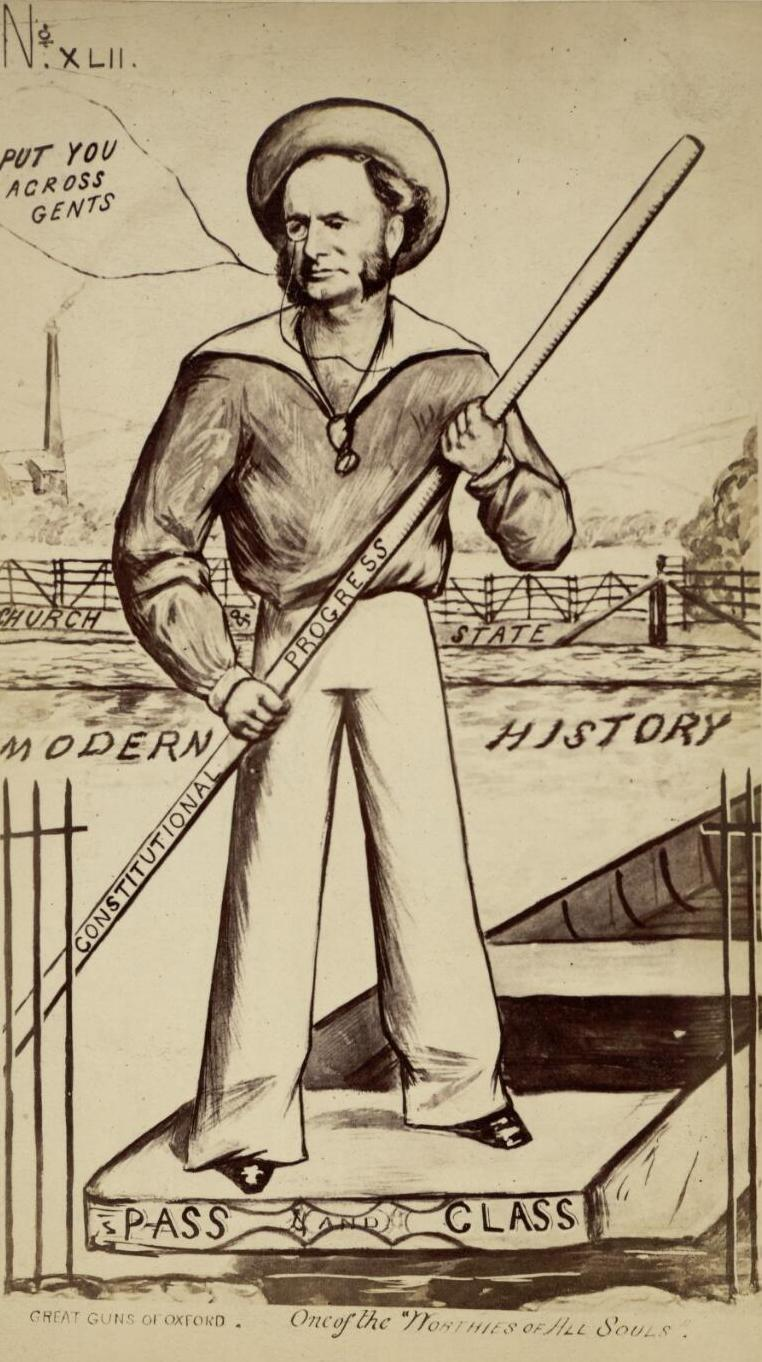
Portrait of Montagu Burrows, 1862

Montagu Burrows (27 October 1819 – 10 July 1905) was a British historian. Following a career as an officer in the Royal Navy, he was the first Chichele Professor of Modern History at Oxford University, holding the Chair from 1862 until his death. He was probably the first academic to lecture on naval history at Oxford or at any university in Britain.

== Early life and naval career ==
Montagu Burrows was born in Hadley, England, the son of Lieutenant-General Montagu Burrows (1775–1848) of the British Army and his wife, Mary Ann Pafford, daughter of Captain Joseph Larcom, Royal Navy. He attended Kingsmills' Boys School in Southampton and entered the Royal Naval College, Portsmouth in 1832. In 1834, he joined HMS Andromache as a midshipman, and then returned to the college as a mate in 1842. He served on anti-piracy patrols on the East Indies Station under Henry Ducie Chads and was decorated for his service at the bombardment of Acre in 1840. Burrows became an instructor in gunnery in HMS Excellent for six years from 1846. Promoted to Commander in 1852, he decided to study at Oxford and was placed on half-pay.

== Academic career ==
While on half pay, Burrows matriculated at Magdalen Hall, Oxford, and read for the final school of literae humaniores. Obtaining first-class honours in 1856, he continued his studies and in 1857 obtained another "first" in the newly established School of Law and History. He is believed to have been the first person, as well as the oldest, to obtain a "double first" at Oxford in these subjects. For the following five years, he tutored students preparing for their examinations and published a popular guide to Oxford undergraduate examinations called Pass and Class.

In 1862, All Souls College, Oxford, established the post of Chichele Professor of Modern History. Burrows competed for it and was selected as its first occupant over younger competitors, including William Stubbs, Edward Freeman, and James Anthony Froude. From 1862 until his retirement in 1900, Burrows regularly lectured on the history of the Royal Navy. His most important books on naval history were his biography of Admiral Edward Hawke (1886). His other works included his memoir of his former commander, Sir Henry Ducie Chads (1869), a study of the Cinque Ports (1883), and a contribution to the Memoirs of Sir Astley Cooper Key by Vice-Admiral Philip Howard Colomb (1898).

Burrows was active in Oxford church affairs as chairman of the Oxford branch of the English Church Union until 1866, secretary of the Universities' Mission to Central Africa, a founder of the Church of Sts Philip and James in North Oxford, president of the Church Schools Managers and Teachers Association, and a member of the group that founded Keble College, Oxford. He contributed often to the Church and State Review, The Churchman, and The Guardian.

Burrows was chairman of the school of modern history from 1889 to 1893. Due to increasing deafness, he retired from the active duties of Chichele Professor in 1900, when Charles Oman was appointed to take them over, but Burrows continued to hold the chair and to take part in university, city, and church affairs.

== Personal life ==
Burrows married Mary Anna, third daughter of Sir James Whalley Smythe Gardiner, 3rd Baronet, of Roche Court, Fareham, on 13 September 1849. They had three sons: Edward Henry (b. 1851), Stephen Montagu (b. 1856) and Alfred (b. 1860); and one daughter, Frances Emily (b. 1853) who married Charles Perry Scott, the Bishop of North China.

== Death ==
Burrows died on 10 July 1905 in Oxford, aged 85. He was given a university funeral with the distinction of having his naval sword displayed on his coffin, while naval flags at Portsmouth were dipped for a Fellow of All Souls.

Charles Oman, who had been appointed Deputy Chichele Professor of Modern History in 1900, was elected Burrows's successor in the Chair in December 1905.

Burrows's widow, Mary Anna Burrows, died in June 1906 at 9, Norham Gardens, Oxford.

== Published works ==
- Pitcairn's Island: a Lecture (1853)
- Pass and Class, an Oxford Guide-Book through the Courses of Literæ Humaniores [&c.] (1860, 1866)
- The Manchester Church Congress and its Probable Results: a Lecture (1863)
- The Relations of Church and State Historically Considered: 2 Lectures (1866)
- Memoir of Admiral Sir Henry Ducie Chads, by an Old Follower (M.B.) (1869)
- Constitutional Progress, 7 lectures (1869)
- Worthies of All Souls: Four Centuries of English History illustrated from the College Archives (1874)
- Parliament and the Church of England (1874)
- History of the Family of Burrows of Sydenham and Long Crendon (1877)
- Imperial England (1880)
- The Register of the Visitors of the University of Oxford, from ... 1647 to ... 1658, with some account of the state of the University during the Commonwealth (1881)
- Wiclif's Place in History: 3 lectures (1882)
- History of the Families of Larcom, Hollis, and McKinley (1883)
- The Life of Edward, Lord Hawke (1883, 1886, 1904)
- Cinque Ports (1888)
- Antiquarianism and History: a Lecture (1895)
- The Family of Brocas of Beaurepaire and Roche court (1886)
- The Publication of the Gascon Rolls by the British and French Governments: a Paper (1892)
- Commentaries on the History of England ... to 1865 (1892)
- The History of the Foreign Policy of Great Britain (1895, revised 1897)
- King Henry VIII and the Reformation: an Address (1898)
- King Alfred the Great. (1898)
- Biblical Criticism, by William Stubbs, Bishop of Oxford, with preface by Montagu Burrows. (1905)
- Autobiography, ed. by Stephen Montagu Burrows (1908)
