= Philip N. Burrows =

British physicist

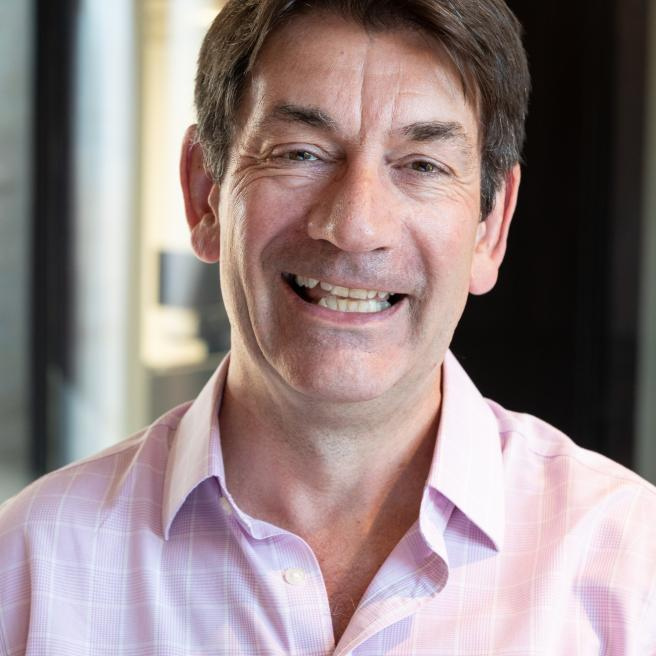
- Born: 1964 (age 61–62)
- Known for: Chair of the CERN Scientific Policy Committee
- Awards: American Physical Society, Division of Particles and Fields Fellowship; Fellow, the Institute of Physics; Member, the European Physical Society
- Scientific career
- Fields: Particle physics
- Institutions: University of Oxford; Massachusetts Institute of Technology; Stanford Linear Accelerator Center; CERN
- Thesis: QCD Processes and Hadron Production in High-Energy e^{+}e^{−} Annihilation (1988)
- Doctoral advisor: Michael G. Bowler

Philip Nicholas Burrows (born 1964) is a professor of Physics and the director of the John Adams Institute for Accelerator Science at the University of Oxford. A former council member, Fellow, and Chartered Physicist of the Institute of Physics of the UK and Ireland, he is also a Fellow of the American Physical Society. He chairs both the High Luminosity Large Hadron Collider Collaboration Board and also the CERN Scientific Policy Committee.

== Personal life and education ==
The son of Nicholas Burrows and Winifred Coyle, Philip Burrows is married to Laura Abrar, and they have one son, Louis.

Burrows earned a Bachelor of Arts Honors Degree in physics at Oriel College, Oxford between 1982 and 1985, and a Master of Arts at Oxford University in 1989. He earned his Doctor of Philosophy in particle physics there from 1985 to 1988. Burrows' dissertation, QCD Processes and Hadron Production in High-Energy e^{+}e^{−} Annihilation, was advised by Michael G. Bowler.

== Career ==
The Massachusetts Institute of Technology hired Burrows as a Principal Research Scientist, based at the Stanford Linear Accelerator Center (now SLAC National Accelerator Laboratory), from 1989 to 1998. Burrows was an Advanced Fellow at the Particle Physics and Astronomy Research Council from 1998 to 2002, as well as Senior Physics Tutor, Pembroke College, Oxford from 1999 to 2003. He was a professor of physics at Queen Mary University of London, from 2002 to 2005.

Burrows has been a professor of physics at Oxford University since 2006, and a Senior Research Fellow of Jesus College, Oxford, from 2007 to the present. By 2007, the Oxford team had completed prototype testing of a "key component of the International Linear Collider (ILC) —one of science's most ambitious ever projects", described as "an ultra fast feed back system being developed at Oxford to control the beams":

Philip Burrows, leader of the Oxford team, said many factors could conspire against the beams colliding. One problem, he said, was that the huge collider facility was extremely noisy and ground motion caused by the sound could make the beams miss each other. "In industrial facilities, things vibrate with 10µ of root m[sup2] random motion," he said. "At the ILC these beams will be roughly 5nm high, but the components are wobbling at micron level, so they are not going to hit one another unless we do something."

Burrows was associate director of the John Adams Institute for Accelerator Science from 2007 to 2018, and in 2008 he was an Erskine Fellow at Canterbury University, in New Zealand.

In 2014, Burrows advocated for advanced planning for the eventual replacement of the Large Hadron Collider:

But with the LHC due to go out of service before 2040, there is no time to waste in planning its replacement, according to Philip Burrows, a senior research fellow in physics at Oxford University. "Since the gestation time for big accelerators is a couple of decades, we need to start thinking now if we want to have a new machine come online in the late 2030s," he says.

From 2017 to 2019 he was a guest professor of the Director General at CERN. From 2018 to 2020 he became interim director of Oxford's John Adams Institute for Accelerator Science, and since 2020 he has served as director there. His profile mentions his team's work, "addressing cutting-edge problems in particle-accelerator physics and technology at leading international facilities. This involves improving the performance of accelerators including the Large Hadron Collider at CERN, the world’s largest, highest-energy particle collider, as well as the UK’s Diamond Light Source and the ISIS neutron and muon source, both located on the nearby Harwell campus."

Burrows was elected as a member of the Council of the UK Institute of Physics (IOP) in July 2021. From October 2021 to September 2025 he served as an elected general trustee of the IOP. According to his IOP profile, "His research programme is focused on ultra-fast feedback and feed-forward systems for controlling the trajectories of relativistic particle beams."

Burrows was elected Collaboration Board Chair of the High Luminosity Large Hadron Collider Collaboration in September 2022 in Uppsala, Sweden. The HL-LHC project's goal is "to increase the performance of the LHC in order to increase the potential for discoveries after 2029... to increase the integrated luminosity by a factor of 10 beyond the LHC's design value."

In January 2026, Burrows became Chair of the CERN Scientific Policy Committee, which "plays a central advisory role, providing objective and impartial guidance to the CERN Council on all aspects of CERN's scientific programme". Burrows commented, "The next few years will be crucial for CERN as it both aims for completion of the upgrade of the Large Hadron Collider and moves to secure approval for its next major collider to advance exploration of the subatomic world through the 2040s and beyond." Burrows joined Gianluigi Arduini and Jacqueline Keintzel in comparing seven proposals, "as options for CERN’s next large-scale collider project: CLIC, FCC-ee, FCC-hh, LCF, LEP3, LHeC and a muon collider".

== Awards and honors ==
Burrows became a Fellow of the Institute of Physics in 2004, as one of those "who have made a significant impact on their sector" and are "...distinguished physicists in recognition of their accomplishments". The Institute noted, "For the last 20 years he [Burrows] has led development of the design, engineering and technology required for advanced particle accelerators and beamlines."

In 2008, Burrows received an American Physical Society, Division of Particles and Fields Fellowship. He was cited For his leading contributions to precision studies of quantum chromodynamics in the light and heavy quark sectors, based on polarized Z^{0} decays recorded with the SLD experiment at SLAC.

He was a trustee of the UK and Ireland Institute of Physics from October 2021 to September 2025.

He received the Outstanding Research Supervision Award from the Oxford University's Mathematical Physical and Life Sciences Division in 2025, for "exceptional dedication, empathy, and unwavering support for his students".

== Selected publications ==
- Bett, D.R.; Burrows, P.N.; Perry, C.; Ramjiawan, R.; Terunuma, N.; Kubo, K.; Okugi, T. (2021). "A sub-micron resolution, bunch-by-bunch beam trajectory feedback system and its application to reducing wakefield effects in single-pass beamlines". Journal of Instrumentation. 16 (1): 01005. arXiv:2008.12738. Bibcode:2021JInst..16P1005B. doi:10.1088/1748-0221/16/01/P01005.
- Roberts, J.; Skowronski, P.; Burrows, P. N.; Christian, G. B.; Corsini, R.; Ghigo, A.; Marcellini, F.; Perry, C. (2018-01-09). "Stabilization of the arrival time of a relativistic electron beam to the 50 fs level". Physical Review Accelerators and Beams. 21 (1) 011001. arXiv:1802.03220. Bibcode:2018PhRvS..21a1001R. doi:10.1103/PhysRevAccelBeams.21.011001. ISSN 2469-9888.
- Apsimon, R. J.; Bett, D. R.; Blaskovic Kraljevic, N.; Bodenstein, R. M.; Bromwich, T.; Burrows, P. N.; Christian, G. B.; Constance, B. D.; Davis, M. R.; Perry, C.; Ramjiawan, R. (2018-12-17). "Design and operation of a prototype interaction point beam collision feedback system for the International Linear Collider". Physical Review Accelerators and Beams. 21 (12) 122802. arXiv:1812.08432. Bibcode:2018PhRvS..21l2802A. doi:10.1103/PhysRevAccelBeams.21.122802. ISSN 2469-9888.
- Ellis, R.K.; et al. (European Strategy for Particle Physics Preparatory Group) (2020-01-10). "Physics Briefing Book". arXiv:1910.11775 [hep-ex]..
- Charles, T. K.; Giansiracusa, P. J.; Lucas, T. G.; Rassool, R.P.; Volpi, M.; Balazs, C.; Afanaciev, K.; et al. (CLIcdp, CLIC) (2018). The Compact Linear e^{+}e^{−} Collider (CLIC) : 2018 Summary Report. CERN Yellow Reports: Monographs. Vol. 2. CERN. arXiv:1812.06018. doi:10.23731/CYRM-2018-002..
- Adolphsen, Chris; Barone, Maura; Barish, Barry; Buesser, Karsten; Burrows, Philip; Carwardine, John; Clark, Jeffrey; Durand, Hélène Mainaud; Dugan, Gerry; et al. (TDR) (2013-06-26). "The International Linear Collider Technical Design Report - Volume 3.II: Accelerator Baseline Design". arXiv:1306.6328 [physics.acc-ph]..
- Behnke, Ties; Brau, James E.; Burrows, Philip N.; Fuster, Juan; Peskin, Michael; Stanitzki, Marcel; Sugimoto, Yasuhiro; Yamada, Sakue; Yamamoto, Hitoshi; et al. (TDR) (2013-06-26). "The International Linear Collider Technical Design Report - Volume 4: Detectors". arXiv:1306.6329 [physics.ins-det]..
- Abe, Koya; Abe, Kenji; Abe, T.; Adam, I.; Akimoto, H.; Aston, D.; Baird, K. G.; Baltay, C.; Band, H. R.; Barklow, T. L.; Bauer, J. M.; Bellodi, G.; Berger, R.; Blaylock, G.; Bogart, J. R.; et al. (SLD Collaboration) (2004-04-12). "Production of π^{+}, π^{−}, K^{+}, K^{−}, p, and p̅ in light (uds) , c, and b jets from Z^{0} decays". Physical Review D. 69 (7) 072003. arXiv:hep-ex/0310017. doi:10.1103/PhysRevD.69.072003. ISSN 1550-7998..
- Abe, Koya; Abe, Kenji; Abe, T.; Adam, I.; Akimoto, H.; Aston, D.; Baird, K. G.; Baltay, C.; Band, H. R.; Barklow, T. L.; Bauer, J. M.; Bellodi, G.; Berger, R.; Blaylock, G.; Bogart, J. R.; et al. (SLD Collaboration) (2002-05-16). "Measurement of the b-quark fragmentation function in Z^{0} decays". Physical Review D. 65 (9) 092006. arXiv:hep-ex/0202031. Bibcode:2002PhRvD..65i2006A. doi:10.1103/PhysRevD.65.092006. ISSN 0556-2821. Archived from the original on 2025-11-24..
- Abe, K.; Abt, I.; Ahn, C. J.; Akagi, T.; Allen, N. J.; Ash, W. W.; Aston, D.; Baird, K. G.; Baltay, C.; Band, H. R.; Barakat, M. B.; Baranko, G.; Bardon, O.; Barklow, T.; Bazarko, A. O.; et al. (SLD Collaboration) (1995-12-04). "First Measurement of the T-Odd Correlation between the Z^{0} Spin and the Three-Jet Plane Orientation in Polarized Z^{0} Decays into Three Jets". Physical Review Letters. 75 (23): 4173–4177. arXiv:hep-ex/9510005. Bibcode:1995PhRvL..75.4173A. doi:10.1103/PhysRevLett.75.4173. ISSN 0031-9007. PMID 10059838..
- Abe, K.; Abt, I.; Ahn, C. J.; Akagi, T.; Ash, W. W.; Aston, D.; Bacchetta, N.; Baird, K. G.; Baltay, C.; Band, H. R.; Barakat, M. B.; Baranko, G.; Bardon, O.; Barklow, T.; Bazarko, A. O.; et al. (SLD Collaboration) (1995-02-27). "Search for Jet Handedness in Hadronic Z^{0} Decays". Physical Review Letters. 74 (9): 1512–1516. arXiv:hep-ex/9501006. Bibcode:1995PhRvL..74.1512A. doi:10.1103/PhysRevLett.74.1512. ISSN 0031-9007. PMID 10059048..
- Brandenburg, A.; Burrows, P. N.; Muller, D.; Oishi, N.; Uwer, P. (1999-09-20). "Measurement of the running b-quark mass using e^{+}e^{−} events". Physics Letters B. 468 (1–2): 168–177. arXiv:hep-ph/9905495. doi:10.1016/S0370-2693(99)01194-6..
- Abe, K.; et al. (SLD Collaboration) (1998-05-20). "Improved test of the flavor independence of strong interactions". Physical Review D. 59 (1) 012002. arXiv:hep-ex/9805023. Bibcode:1998PhRvD..59a2002A. doi:10.1103/PhysRevD.59.012002..
- Burrows, P. N.; Masuda, H.; Muller, D.; Ohnishi, Y. (1996-02-02). "Application of "optimised" perturbation theory to determination of $\alpha_s (M_Z^2)$) from hadronic event shape observables in e^{+}e^{−} annihilation". Physics Letters B. 382 (1–2): 157–164. arXiv:hep-ph/9602210. doi:10.1016/0370-2693(96)00570-9..
- Abe, K.; et al. (SLD Collaboration) (1997-07-23). "Measurement of $\alpha_s$($M_Z^2$) from hadronic event observables at the $Z^0$ resonance". Physical Review D. 51 (3): 962–984. arXiv:hep-ex/9501003. doi:10.1103/PhysRevD.51.962. PMID 10018557..
- Burrows, P. N. (1988-09-01). "Predictions of QCD fragmentation models in e^{+}e^{−} annihilation up to √s = 200 GeV". Zeitschrift für Physik C. 41 (3): 375–384. doi:10.1007/BF01585621. ISSN 1431-5858.
- Braunschweig, W.; Gerhards, R.; Kirschfink, F. J.; Martyn, H. -U.; Bock, B.; Fischer, H. M.; Hartmann, H.; Hartmann, J.; Hilger, E.; Jocksch, A.; Wedemeyer, R.; Foster, B.; Martin, A. J.; Bernardi, E.; Chwastowski, J.; et al. (TASSO Collaboration) (1989-03-01). "Comparison of inclusive fractional momentum distributions of quark and gluon jets produced in e^{+}e^{−} annihilation". Zeitschrift für Physik C. 45 (1): 1–10. doi:10.1007/BF01556665. ISSN 1431-5858..
