= George Man Burrows =

English physician

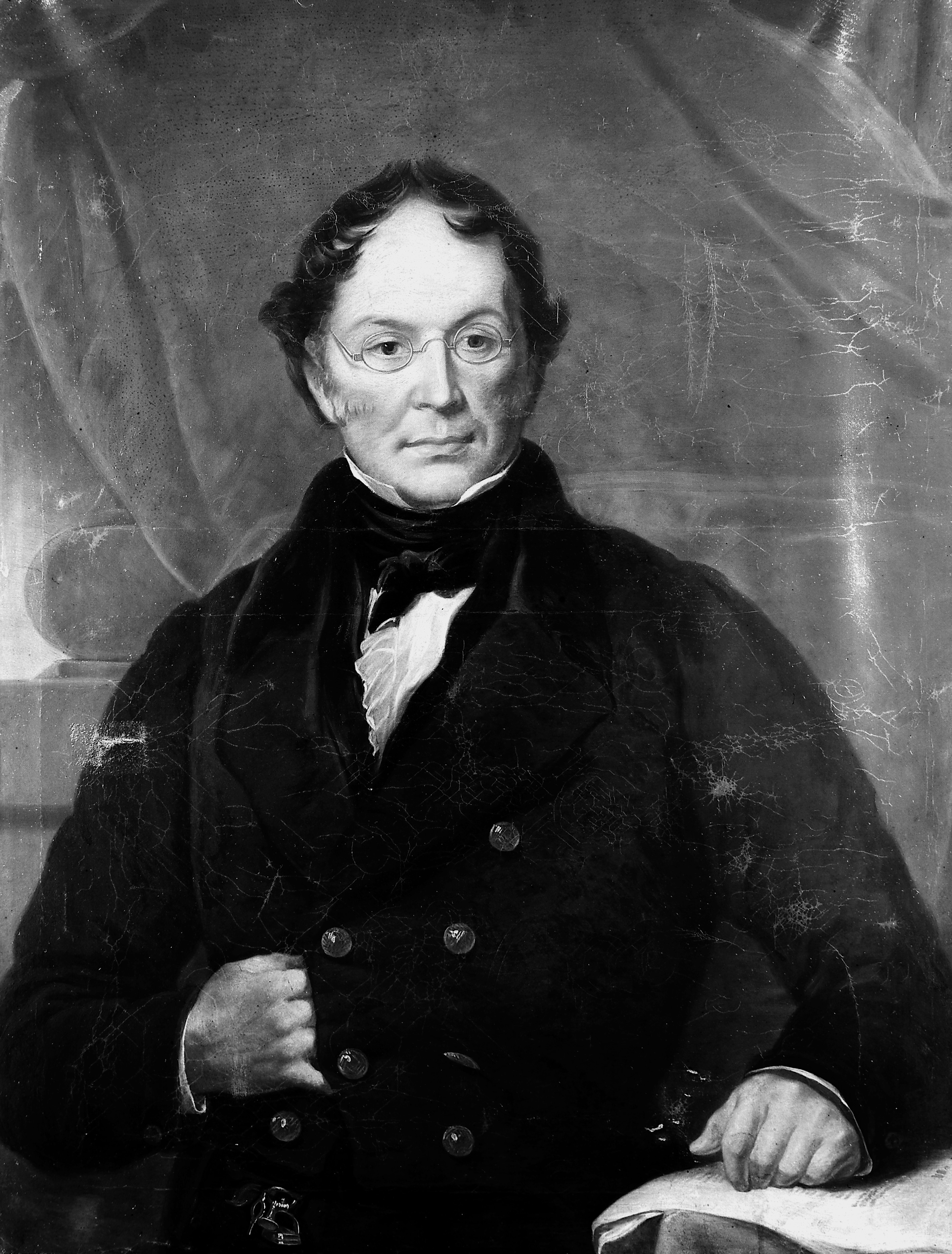
George Man Burrows

George Man Burrows (1771 – 29 October 1846) was an English physician who was an expert on insanity.

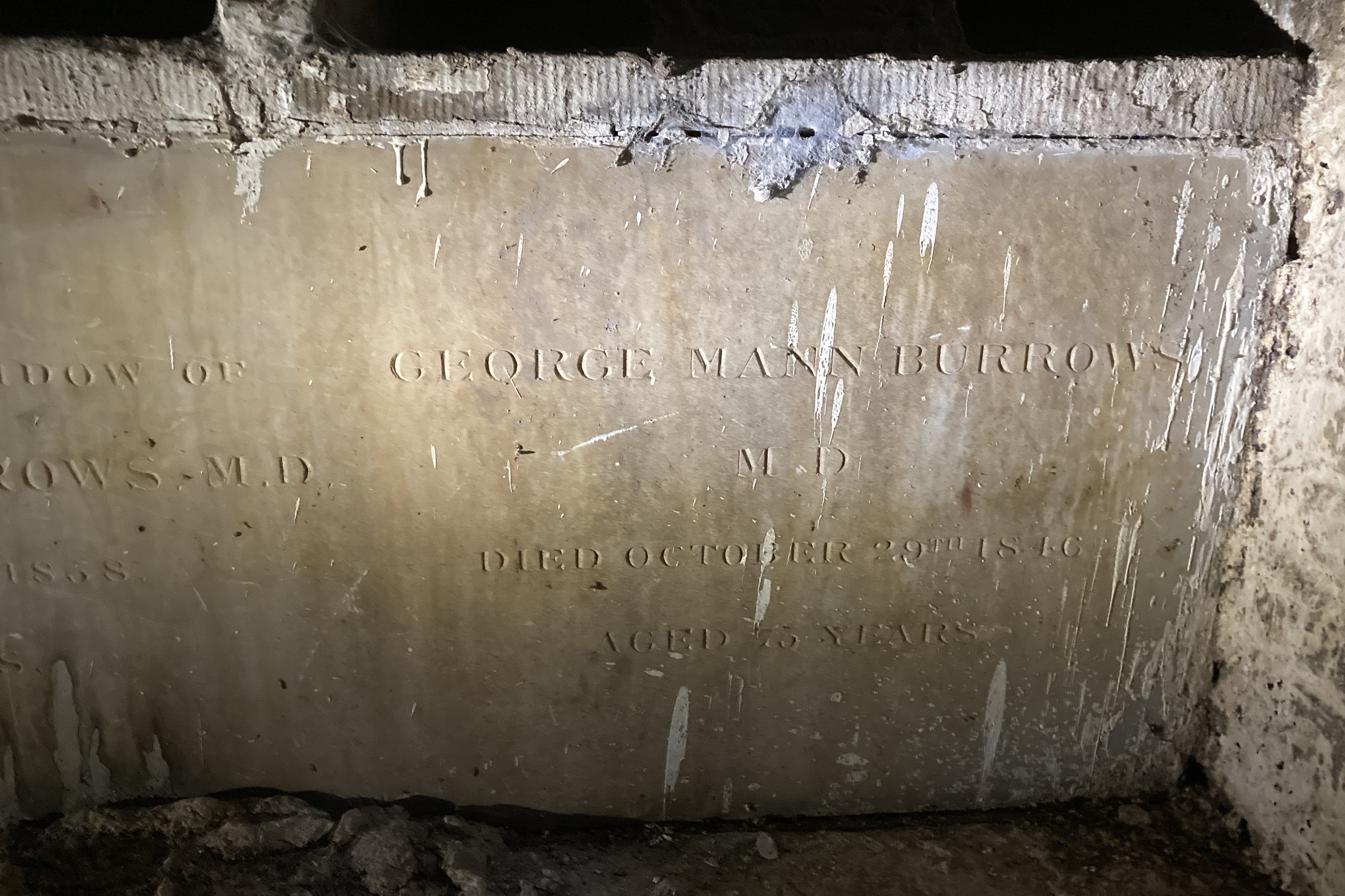
Grave of George Mann Burrows in the Terrace Catacombs in Highgate Cemetery

== Biography ==
Burrows was born at Chalk, near Gravesend, in 1771. He was educated at the King's School, Canterbury, was apprenticed to an apothecary at Rochester, and completed his medical education at Guy's and St. Thomas's Hospitals. After qualifying at the College of Surgeons and Apothecaries' Hall, he entered on general practice in London. He became deeply interested in the legal status of the medical profession, and organised the Association of Surgeon-Apothecaries of England and Wales, with the object of improving the education and status of the profession. As chairman of this body Burrows was most indefatigable, and had a large share in the movement which led to the passing of the Apothecaries' Act in 1815. The society voted him five hundred guineas on its dissolution. On the formation of the first court of examiners of the Apothecaries' Company, on the passing of the act, Burrows was appointed an examiner; but early in 1817 he resigned, owing to the unfair conduct of the court of assistants. On this question Burrows published a Statement of Circumstances connected with the Apothecaries' Act and its Administration in 1817. At this time he was largely engaged in medical literature, being one of the founders and editors of the London Medical Repository, which commenced in January 1814, and the author of Observations on the Comparative Mortality of London and Paris in 1815.

In 1816, Burrows retired from general practice, and devoted himself to the treatment of insane patients, at first keeping a small asylum at Chelsea, and later, in 1823, establishing a larger one, ‘The Retreat’, at Clapham. He became M.D. of St Andrews in 1824, and a Fellow of the Royal College of Physicians in 1839.

He died on 29 October 1846, aged 76, and is buried adjacent to his wife Sophia (1768 - 1858) in the Terrace Catacombs in Highgate Cemetery.

== Works ==
Burrows became a leading authority on insanity, publishing Cursory Remarks on Legislative Regulation of the Insane (1819), and An Inquiry into certain Errors relative to Insanity and their Consequences, Physical, Moral, and Civil (1820). An extended treatise, Commentaries on the Causes, Forms, Symptoms, and Treatment, Moral and Medical, of Insanity, 1828, was the most complete practical British psychiatric treatise published up to that time.
