= Whalley-Smythe-Gardiner baronets =

Family of low nobility in England

Escutcheon of the Whalley-Gardiner baronets of Roche Court

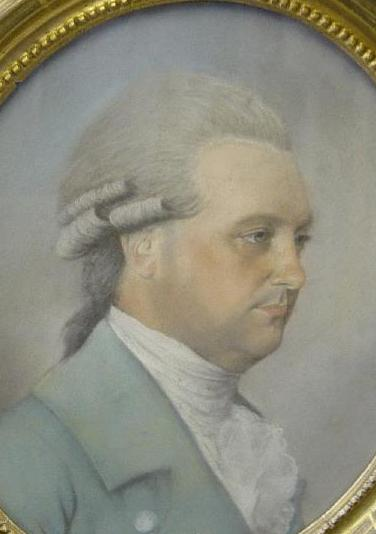
Sir John Whalley-Smythe-Gardiner, 1st Baronet, (1743–1797), Bath, 1780, bust length pastel portrait (12 × 9 inches), signed and dated by Lewis Vaslet (1742–1808), Bath, 1780.

The Whalley-Gardiner, later Whalley-Smythe-Gardiner baronetcy, of Roch(e) Court in the County of Southampton, was a title in the Baronetage of Great Britain. It was created on 14 January 1783 for the landowner John Whalley-Gardiner, Member of Parliament for Westbury. It was created with special remainder, failing male issue, to his brothers and their issue male.

Born John Whalley, he was the son of Robert Whallyy, M.D. of Blackburn and his wife Grace Gardiner. His mother was the daughter of Bernard Gardiner, and the heir of his mother's first cousin the 3rd Baronet of the Gardiner baronets of Roche Court. He assumed the additional surname of Gardiner on succeeding to the Gardiner estates. He further inherited Arncott Manor, Cuddesdon in 1787 from Barbara Smythe, another cousin of his mother, and added Smythe as middle name in his hyphenated name.

The 2nd Baronet, brother of the 1st Baronet, assumed the additional surname of Smythe on succeeding to the Smythe property. The 3rd Baronet was High Sheriff of Hampshire in 1810. The title became extinct on the death of the 4th Baronet in 1868.

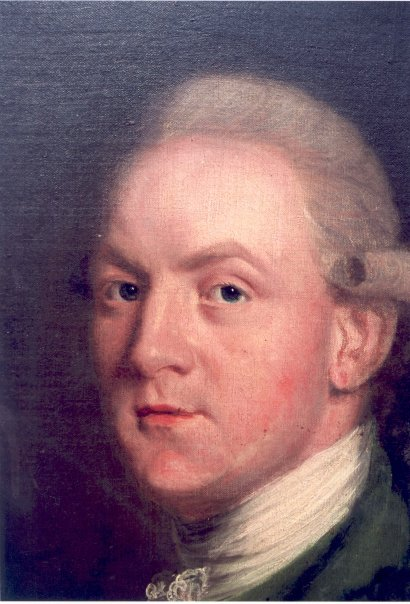
Sir James Whalley-Smythe-Gardiner, 2nd Bt. (1748–1805) (detail).

== Whalley-Gardiner, later Whalley-Smythe-Gardiner baronets, of Roche Court (1783) ==
- Sir John Whalley-Gardiner, 1st Baronet (1743–1797), DCL, of Tackley, Oxfordshire He married in 1787 Martha Newcombe, daughter of Benjamin Newcombe.
- Sir James Whalley-Smythe-Gardiner, 2nd Baronet (1748–1805), A.M., of Clerk-Hill (purchased by his grandfather in 1715), Whalley, Lancashire (sold 1871). Married (1784) (1) Elizabeth Assheton (1761–1785) (of the family of Richard Assheton of Middleton and (2) Jane Master (aunt of Robert Mosley Master).
- Sir James Whalley-Smythe-Gardiner, 3rd Baronet (1785–1851), married (1807) Frances (d. 1855) sister of Oswald Mosley, of Rollestone and Bolesworth.
- Sir John Brocas Whalley-Smythe-Gardiner, 4th Baronet (1814–1868), married (1861) as her third husband Mary Harriet Forrest.

== Extended family ==
- Jane Elizabeth Whalley-Smythe-Gardiner, daughter of the 2nd Baronet, was the paternal grandmother of John Jellicoe, 1st Earl Jellicoe.
- Mary Anna, third daughter of the 3rd Baronet, was the wife of the historian and Royal Navy captain Montagu Burrows.
- The 4th Baronet's only daughter, Mabel Katharina Whalley-Smythe-Gardiner (1863–1892), inherited Roche Court and married (1887) Henry Fielden Rawstorne, son of Robert Rawstorne. Their daughter Mabel Dorothy Rawstorne (1889–1936) inherited, and in 1924 married as his second wife the widower Sir William De Salis (1858–1939).

== See also ==
- Gardiner baronets

Baronetage of Great Britain
Preceded by Parker baronets	Whalley-Gardiner baronets of Roche Court; 14 January 1783	Succeeded by Graham baronets
