= Arthur Burrows (footballer) =

English footballer

Personal information
- Full name: Arthur Burrows
- Date of birth: 4 December 1919
- Place of birth: Stockport, England
- Date of death: March 2005
- Place of death: Stockport, England
- Position: Wing half

Senior career*
Years	Team	Apps	(Gls)
1938–1947	Stockport County	5	(1)
1947–1948	Ashton United	?	(?)
1948–1949	Accrington Stanley	9	(0)
1951–1952	Mossley	4	(0)
Total		18	(1)
- * Club domestic league appearances and goals

Arthur Burrows (4 December 1919 – March 2005), is an English former professional footballer who played as a wing half in the Football League.
