= Owen Burrows =

Australian cricketer

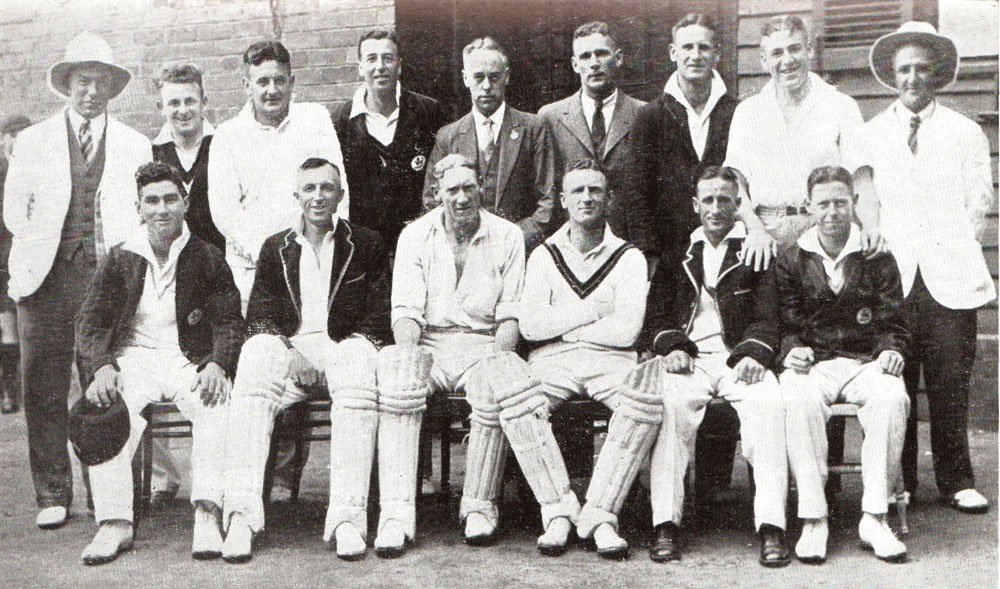
- The Tasmanian cricket team in 1932. Burrows is standing fourth from left.

Personal information
- Full name: Arthur Owen Burrows
- Born: 17 October 1903; Hobart, Tasmania, Australia
- Died: 4 January 1984 (aged 80); Hobart, Tasmania, Australia
- Batting: Right-handed
- Bowling: Right-arm fast-medium

Domestic team information
- Years: Team
- 1923–1937: Tasmania

Career statistics
Competition	FC
Matches	32
Runs scored	1054
Batting average	19.51
100s/50s	0/3
Top score	69
Balls bowled	4568
Wickets	77
Bowling average	30.84
5 wickets in innings	3
10 wickets in match	0
Best bowling	5/35
Catches/stumpings	19/–
- Source: Cricinfo, 20 July 2020

Arthur Owen Burrows (17 October 1903 – 4 January 1984) was an Australian cricketer. He played 32 first-class matches between 1923 and 1937, mostly for Tasmania.

Burrows was a pacy opening bowler and useful lower-order batsman. In the 1929–30 season he played a match for Woodfull's XI versus Ryder's XI. His best first-class bowling figures were 5 for 35 in Tasmania's victory over Victoria in 1931–32. In a senior Hobart club match in November 1925, Burrows bowled a ball that, in dismissing a batsman, knocked a bail 83 yards 1 foot 9 inches (76.43 metres), which is believed to be a world record.

Burrows married Edna Gorringe in Hobart in November 1933. He died in Hobart in January 1984, aged 80.
