= Robert Burrows (cricketer) =

English cricketer

Robert Dickson Burrows (6 June 1871 – 12 February 1943) was a first-class cricketer who played for Worcestershire County Cricket Club between 1899 and 1919, he also umpired one test match and set a world record in 1911 when he sent a bail spinning 67 yards and 6 inches when he bowled Huddleston at Old Trafford.

He bowled right arm fast medium and was a more than handy right-handed batsman. He took 96 wickets in 1901 and exactly 100 wickets in 1910, at 23.46 and 1913 at 21.41, leading his county's attack for some years.

Burrows scored 112 against Gloucestershire County Cricket Club at Worcester in 1907 and averaged 25.28, but his bowling fell to 57 wickets at 24 runs apiece, as Arnold and Cuffe came to the fore. He recorded his second first-class century, 107* again against Gloucestershire, at Worcester in July 1914, when he batted number ten. In all first-class cricket he scored 5223 runs at 14.07 and took 894 wickets, with a best of 8 for 48 at 26.40 apiece. He held 138 catches, mostly at point. In 1923 he joined the first-class umpire's list and served during nine seasons. His sole test match in charge came in the England v Australia match at Trent Bridge from 12 to 15 June 1926.
