= Charles Scott (bishop) =

English Anglican missionary bishop

Charles Perry Scott (7 June 1847, in Hull – 13 February 1927, in Shanghai) was an Anglican missionary bishop.

Scott was born into an ecclesiastical family: his father was the Rev. John Scott, sometime Vicar of St Mary's Church, Hull. He was named for his godfather, Charles Perry (Bishop of Melbourne) and educated at Charterhouse and Jesus College, Cambridge, where he graduated B.A. in 1870. Ordained in 1871, he was a Curate at St Peter, Eaton Square before going to China as a missionary. In 1880 he was appointed bishop in North China, a post he held until 1913. His diocese included five Chinese provinces. In 1889 he married Frances Emily Burrows, daughter of the Oxford historian Montagu Burrows and granddaughter of General Montagu Burrows.

Scott died on 13 February 1927.
