= Winter service vehicle =

Vehicle used to clear snow and ice

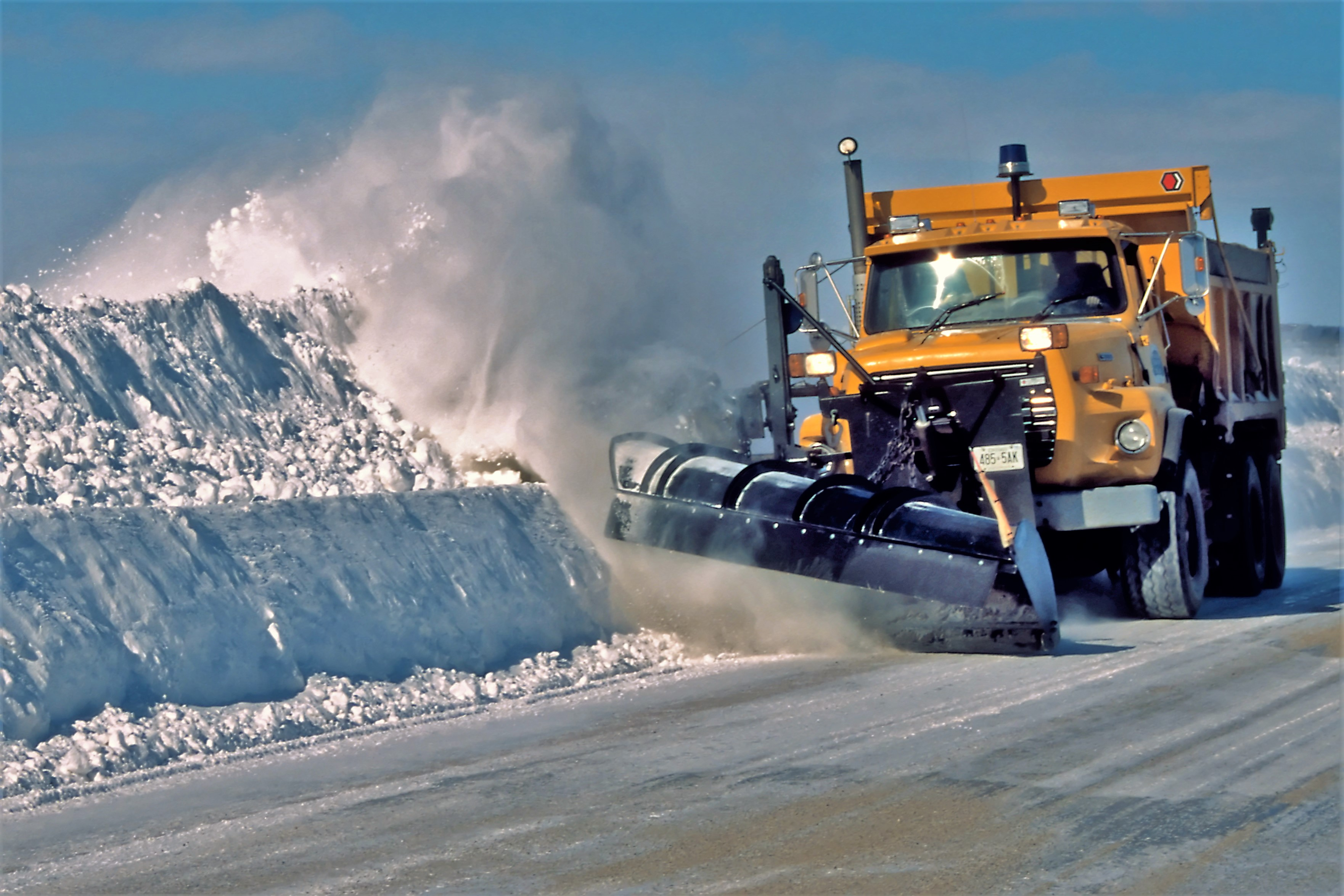
A winter service vehicle clearing roads near Toronto, Ontario

A winter service vehicle (WSV), or snow removal vehicle, is a vehicle specially designed or adapted to clear thoroughfares of ice and snow. Winter service vehicles are usually based on a dump truck chassis, with adaptations allowing them to carry specially designed snow removal equipment. Many authorities also use smaller vehicles on sidewalks, footpaths, and cycleways. Road maintenance agencies and contractors in temperate or polar areas often own several winter service vehicles, using them to keep the roads clear of snow and ice and safe for driving during winter. Airports use winter service vehicles to keep aircraft surfaces, runways, and taxiways free of snow and ice, which, besides endangering aircraft takeoff and landing, can interfere with the aerodynamics of the craft.

The earliest winter service vehicles were snow rollers, designed to maintain a smooth, even road surface for sleds, although horse-drawn snowplows and gritting vehicles are recorded in use as early as 1862. The increase in motor car traffic and aviation in the early 20th century led to the development and popularisation of large motorised winter service vehicles.

== History ==
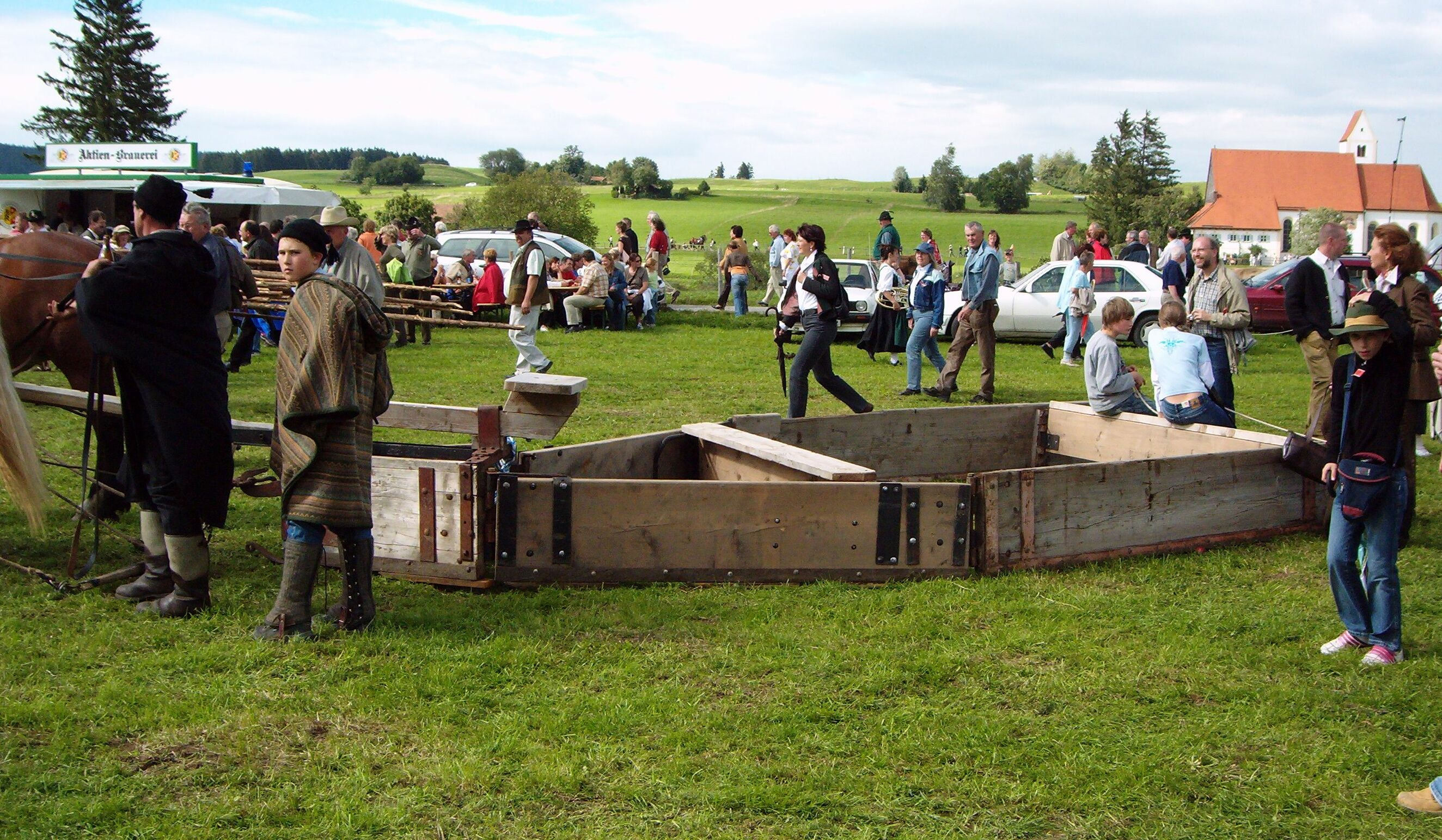
An early horse-drawn snowplow at the Rosstag Burggen, a historical reenactment of life in 19th-century Germany

Although snow removal dates back to at least the Middle Ages, early attempts merely involved using a shovel or broom to remove snow from walkways and roads. Before motorised transport, snow removal was seen as less of a concern; unpaved roads in rural areas were dangerous and bumpy, and snow and ice made the surface far smoother. Most farmers could simply replace their wagons with sleds, allowing the transport of heavy materials such as timber with relative ease. Early communities in the northern regions of the United States and Canada even used animal-drawn snow rollers, the earliest winter service vehicles, to compress the snow covering roads. The compression increased the life of the snow and eased passage for sleds. Some communities even employed snow wardens to spread or "pave" snow onto exposed areas such as bridges, to allow sleds to use these routes.

However, with the increase in paved roads and the increasing size of cities, snow-paving fell out of favour, as the resultant slippery surfaces posed a danger to pedestrians and traffic. The earliest patents for snowplows date back to 1840, but there are no records of their actual use until 1862, when the city of Milwaukee began operating horse-drawn carts fitted with snowplows. The horse-drawn snowplow quickly spread to other cities, especially those in areas prone to heavy snowfall.

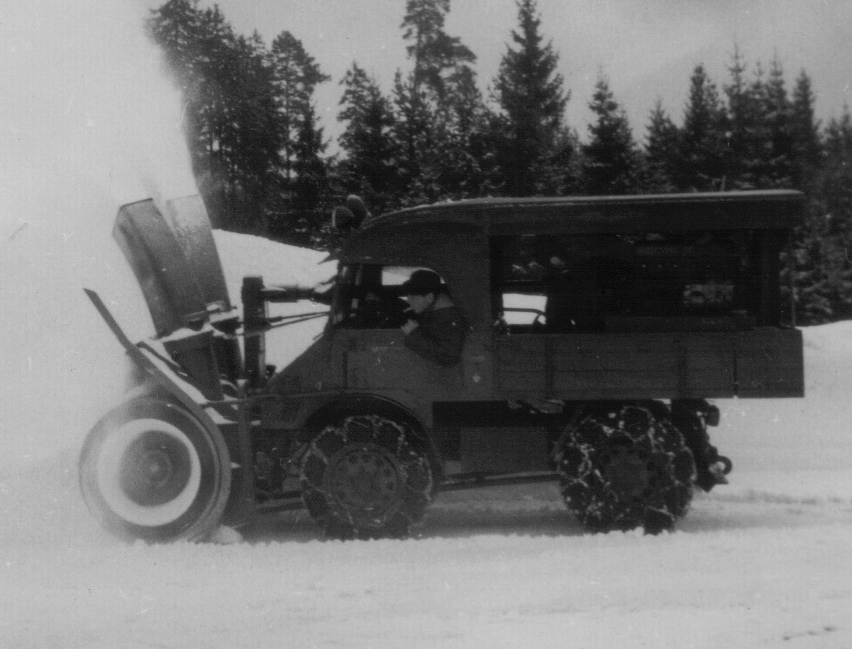
An Unimog 401 snow blower from 1955

The first motorised snowplows were developed in 1913, based on truck and tractor bodies. These machines allowed the mechanisation of the snow clearing process, reducing the labor required for snow removal and increasing the speed and efficiency of the process. The expansion of the aviation industry also acted as a catalyst for the development of winter service vehicles during the early 20th century. Even a light dusting of snow or ice could cause an aeroplane to crash, so airports erected snow fences around airfields to prevent snowdrifts, and began to maintain fleets of vehicles to clear runways in heavy weather.

With the popularisation of the motor car, it was found that plowing alone was insufficient for removing all snow and ice from the roadway, leading to the development of gritting vehicles, which used sodium chloride to accelerate the melting of the snow. Early attempts at gritting were resisted, as the salt used encouraged rusting, causing damage to the metal structures of bridges and the shoes of pedestrians. However, as the number of motoring accidents increased, the protests subsided and by the end of the 1920s, many cities in the United States used salt and sand to clear the roads and increase road safety. As environmental awareness increased through the 1960s and 1970s, gritting once again came under criticism due to its environmental impact, leading to the development of alternative de-icing chemicals and more efficient spreading systems.

== Design ==
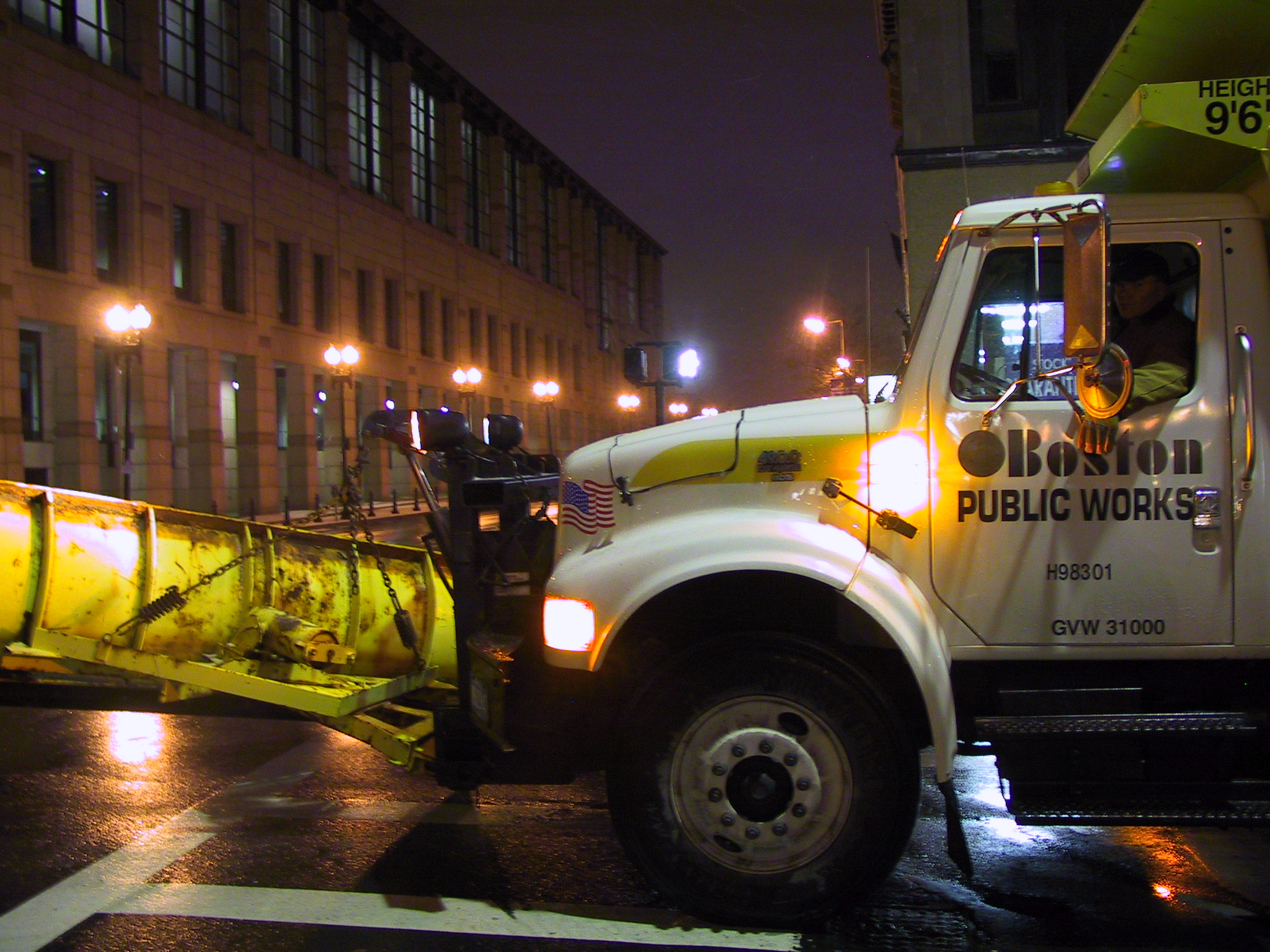
The cab of a winter service vehicle in Boston, Massachusetts, showing the plow-frame, amber lightbar, and retroreflectors

Winter service vehicles are usually based on a dump truck chassis, which are then converted into winter service vehicles either by the manufacturer or an aftermarket third-party. A typical modification involves the replacement of steel components of the vehicle with corrosion resistant aluminium or fibreglass, waterproofing any exposed electronic components, replacement of the stock hopper with a specially designed gritting body, the addition of a plow frame, reinforcement of the wheels, bumpers to support the heavy blade, and the addition of extra headlamps, a light bar, and retroreflectors for visibility.

Other common changes include the replacement of the factory stock tires with rain tires or mud and snow tires and the shortening of the vehicle's wheelbase to improve maneuverability. For smaller applications smaller trucks are used. In Canada, pickup trucks are used with snow removal operations with a blade mounted in front and optional de-icing equipment installed in the rear. Underbody scrapers are also used by some agencies and are mounted between axles, distributing plowing stresses on the chassis more evenly.

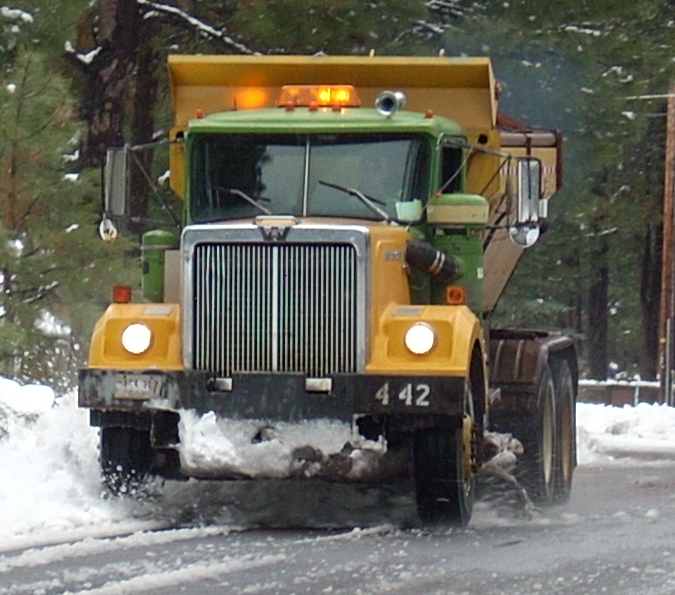
Truck using underbody scraper, showing high contrast cab paint and sand hopper stripe, Deschutes County Oregon

In most countries, winter service vehicles usually have amber light bars, which are activated to indicate that the vehicle is operating below the local speed limit or otherwise poses a danger to other traffic, either by straddling lanes or by spreading grit or de-icer. In some areas, such as the Canadian province of Ontario, winter service vehicles use the blue flashing lights associated with emergency service vehicles, rather than the amber or orange used elsewhere. In Michigan, green flashing lights are used. Many agencies also paint their vehicles in high-contrast orange or yellow to allow the vehicles to be seen more clearly in whiteout conditions.

Some winter service vehicles, especially those designed for use on footpaths or pedestrian zones, are built on a far smaller chassis using small tractors or custom made vehicles. These vehicles are often multi-purpose, and can be fitted with other equipment such as brushes, lawnmowers or cranes—as these operations are generally unable to run during heavy snowfalls, there is generally little overlap between the different uses, reducing the size of the fleet required by the agency or contractor.

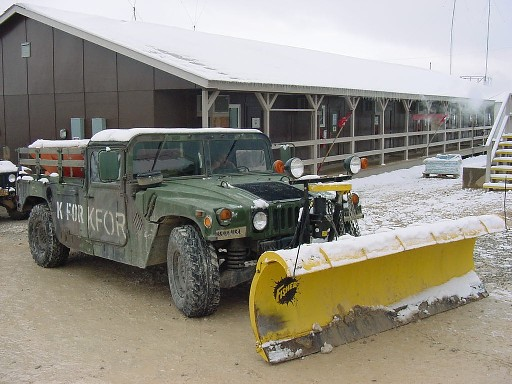
A Humvee with Fisher plow, serving with the United States Army 27th Engineer Battalion in Kosovo

Modern winter service vehicles will usually also have a satellite navigation system connected to a weather forecast feed, allowing the driver to choose the best areas to treat and to avoid areas in which rain is likely, which can wash away the grit used—the most advanced can even adapt to changing conditions, ensuring optimal gritter and plow settings. Most run on wheels, often with snow chains or studded tires, but some are mounted on caterpillar tracks, with the tracks themselves adapted to throw the snow towards the side of the road. Off-road winter service vehicles mounted on caterpillar tracks are known as snowcats. Snowcats are commonly fitted with snowplows or snow groomers, and are used by ski resorts to smooth and maintain pistes and snowmobile runs, although they can also be used as a replacement for chairlifts.

Military winter service vehicles are heavily armoured to allow for their use in combat zones, especially in Arctic and mountain warfare, and often based on combat bulldozers or Humvees. Military winter service vehicles have been used by the United Nations, Kosovo Force, and the US Army in Central Europe during the Kosovo War, while during the Cold War, the Royal Marines and Royal Corps of Signals deployed a number of tracked vehicles in Norway to patrol the NATO border with the Soviet Union.

== Operation ==
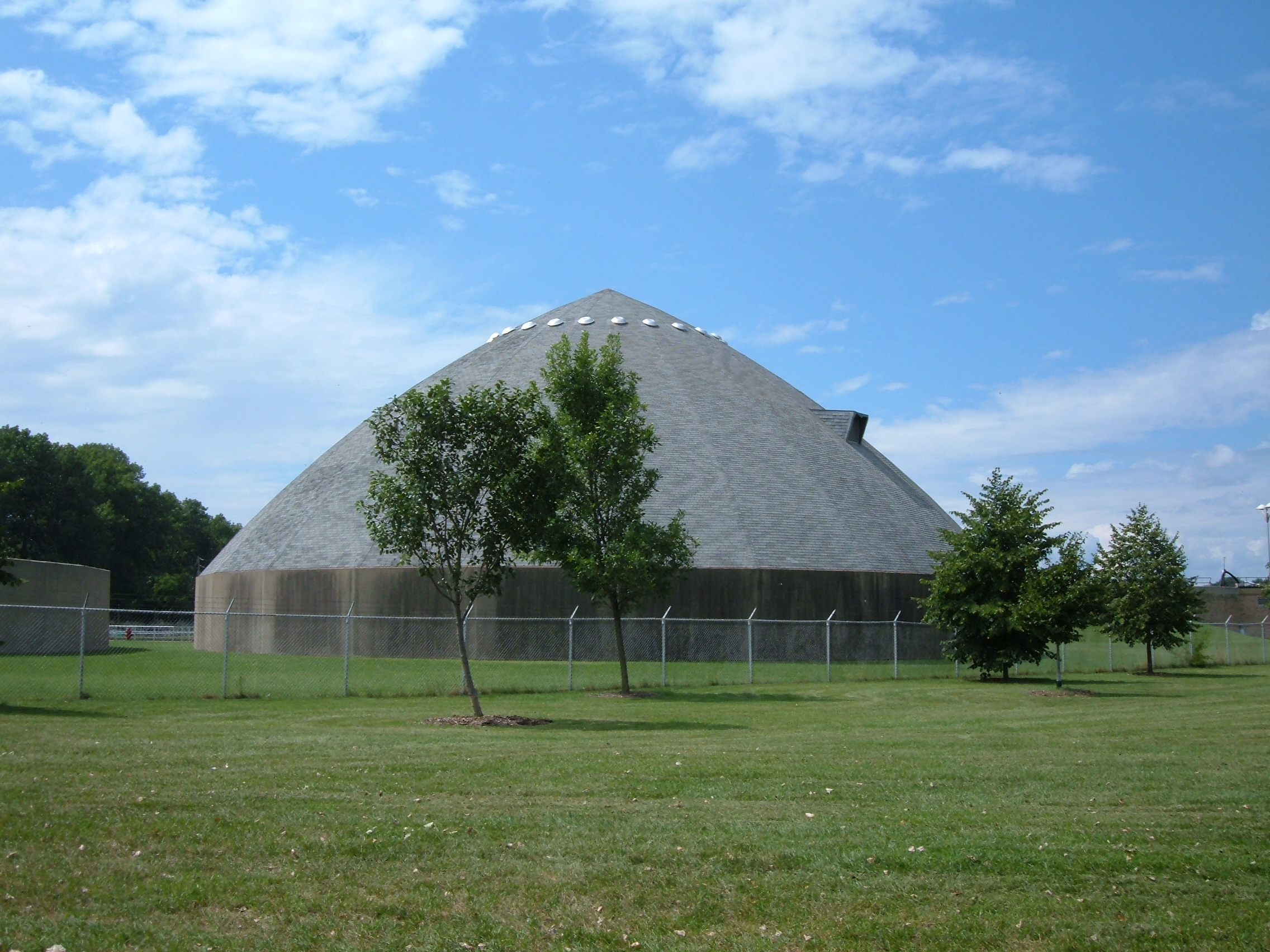
A salt barn near Lake Michigan, used for storing grit and providing limited accommodation for gritter drivers during winter storms

Winter service vehicles are operated by both government agencies and by private subcontractors. Public works in areas which regularly receive snowfall usually maintain a fleet of their own vehicles or pay retainers to contractors for priority access to vehicles in winter, while cities where snow is a less regular occurrence may simply hire the vehicles as needed. Winter service vehicles in the United Kingdom are the only road-going vehicles entitled to use red diesel. Though the vehicles still use public highways, they are used to keep the road network operational, and forcing them to pay extra tax to do so would discourage private contractors from assisting with snow removal on public roads. Winter service vehicle drivers in the United States must hold a Class A or Class B commercial driver's license. Although some agencies in some areas, such as the US state of Minnesota, allow winter service vehicle drivers to operate without any extra training, most provide supplemental lessons to drivers to teach them the most effective and safe methods of snow removal. Many require that trainee drivers ride-along with more experienced drivers, and some even operate specially designed driving simulators, which can safely replicate dangerous winter driving conditions. Other organisations require that all staff have a recognised additional licence or certificate—the United Kingdom Highways Agency for example requires that all staff have both a City & Guilds qualification and a supplemental Winter Maintenance Licence.

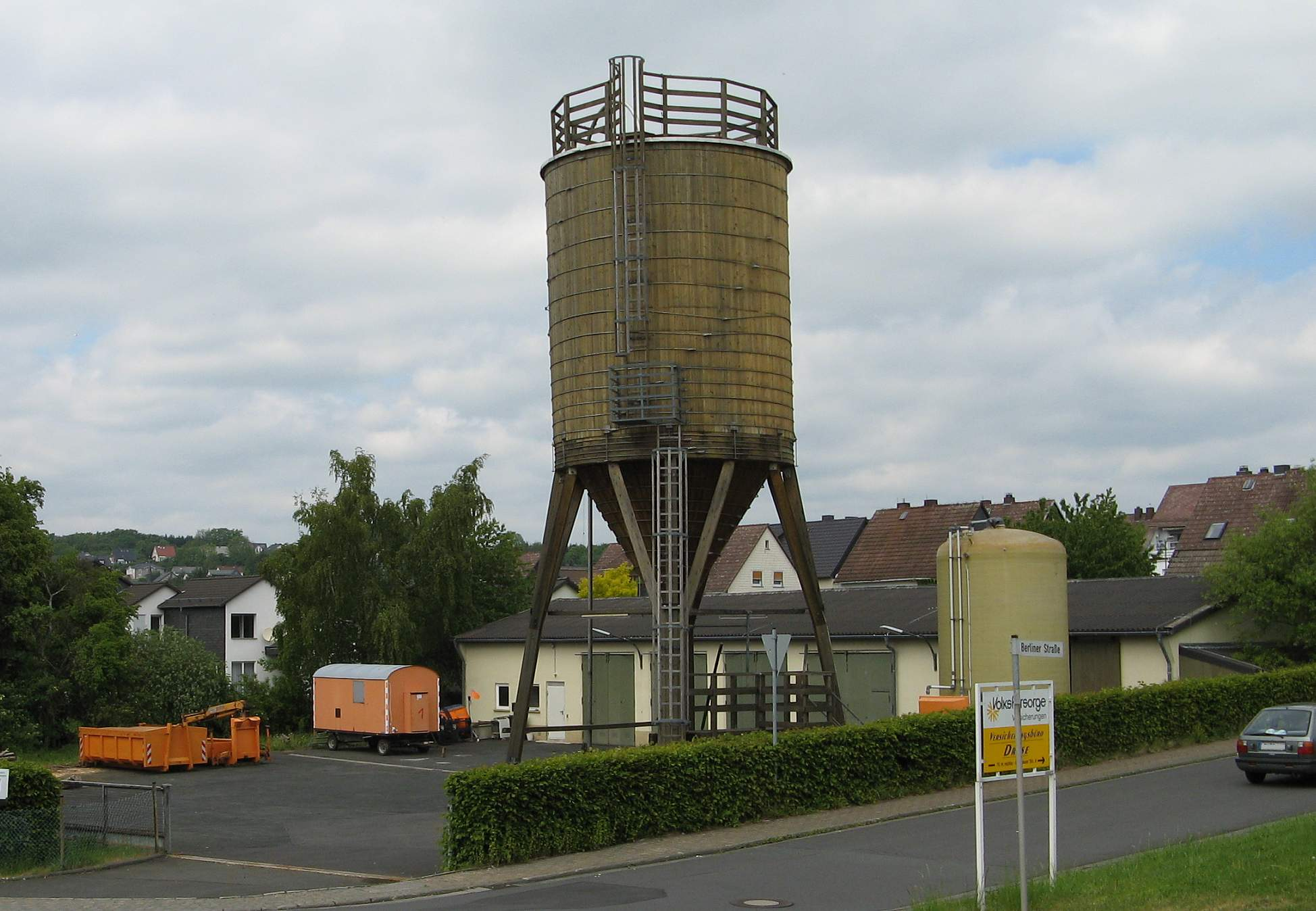
A brine tank at a service depot in Germany

Winter service vehicle drivers usually work part-time, before and during inclement weather only, with drivers working a 12- to 16-hour shift. Main roads are typically gritted in advance, to reduce the disruption to the network. Salt barns are provided at regular intervals for drivers to collect more grit, and bedding is provided at road maintenance depots for drivers to use between shifts in heavy or prolonged storms.

Weather conditions typically vary greatly depending on altitude; hot countries can experience heavy snowfall in mountainous regions yet receive very little in low-lying areas, increasing the accident rate among drivers inexperienced in winter driving. In addition, road surface temperatures can fall rapidly at higher altitudes, precipitating rapid frost formation. As a result, gritting and plowing runs are often prioritised in favour of clearing these mountain roads, especially at the start and end of the snow season. The hazardous roads through mountain passes pose additional problems for the large winter service vehicles. The heavy metal frame and bulky grit makes hill climbing demanding for the vehicle, so vehicles have extremely high torque transmission systems to provide enough power to make the climb. Furthermore, because the tight hairpin turns found on mountain slopes are difficult for long vehicles to navigate, winter service vehicles for use in mountainous areas are shortened, usually from six wheels to four.

== Equipment ==
=== De-icer ===
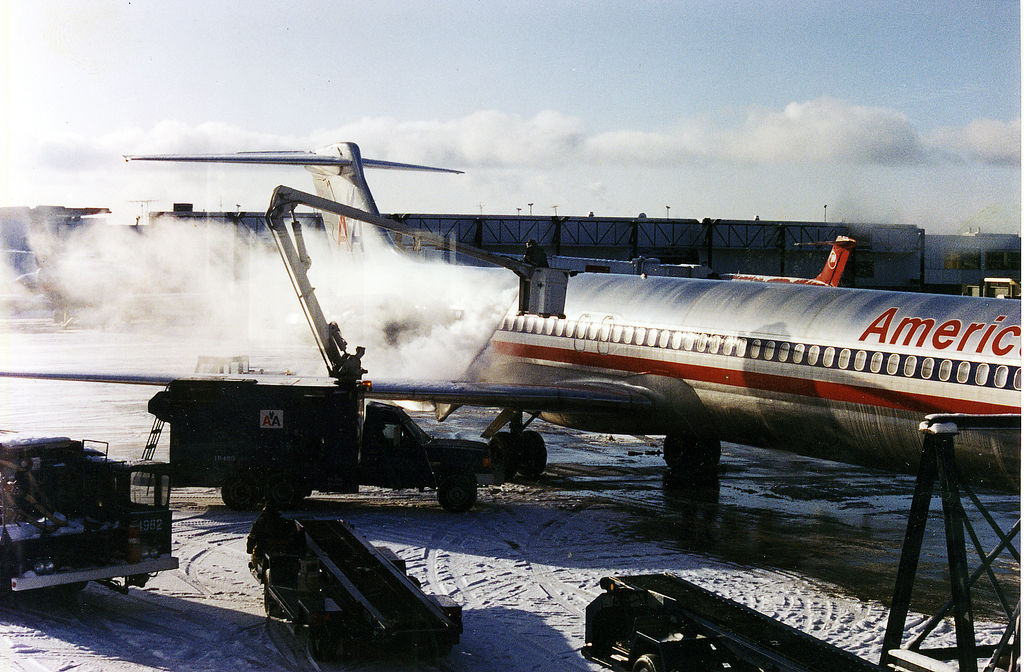
A de-icing vehicle treating an American Airlines McDonnell Douglas MD-80 at Syracuse Hancock International Airport, New York

De-icers spray heated de-icing fluid, most often using propylene glycol (formerly ethylene glycol was used), onto icy surfaces such as the bodies of aircraft and road surfaces. These prevent ice from forming on the body of the aircraft while on the ground. Ice makes the surface of the wings rougher, reducing the amount of lift they provide while increasing drag. The ice also increases the weight of the aircraft and can affect its balance.

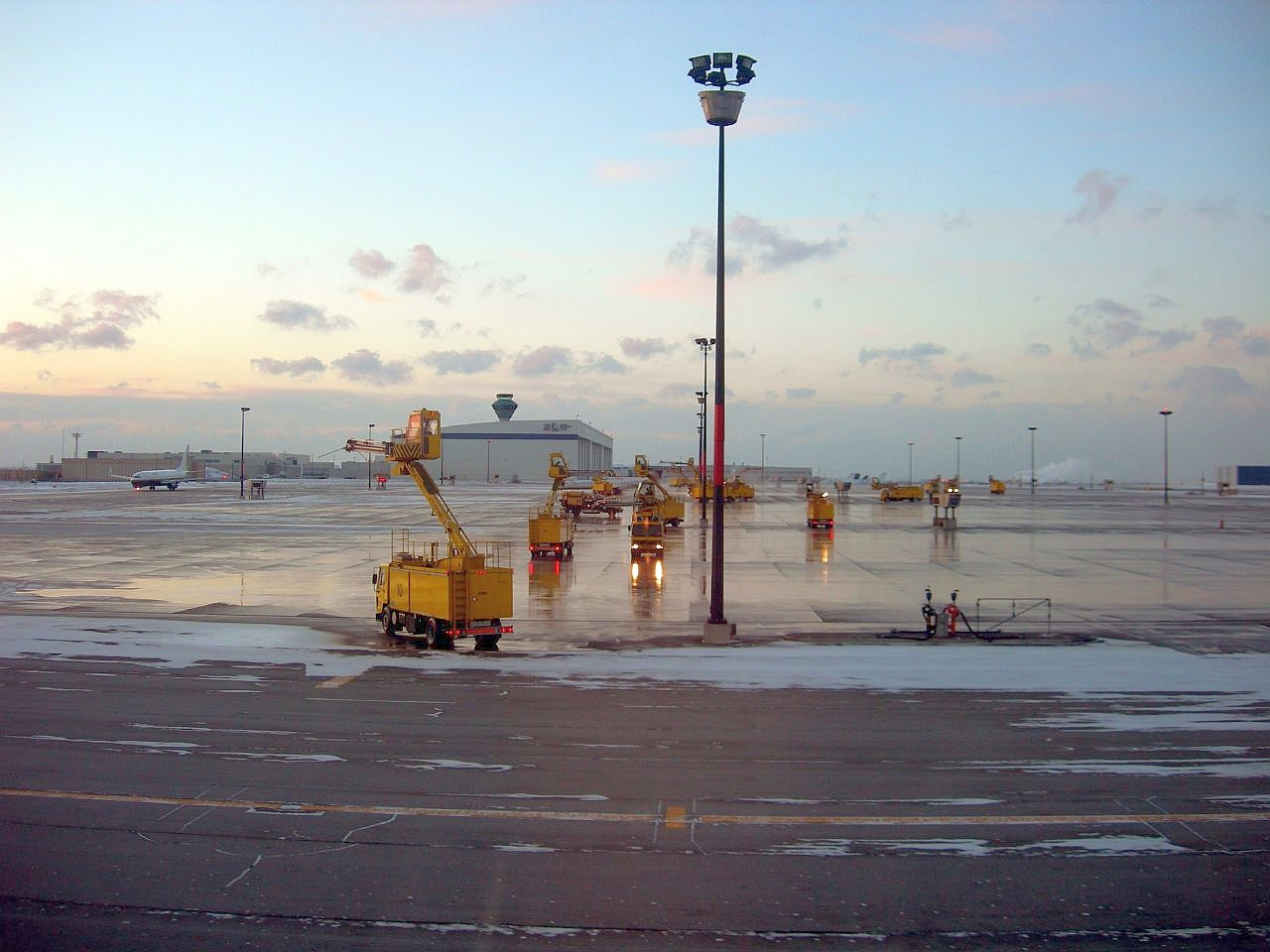
Toronto Pearson Airport's Central De-icing Facility

Aircraft de-icing vehicles usually consist of a large tanker truck, containing the concentrated de-icing fluid, with a water feed to dilute the fluid according to the ambient temperature. The vehicle also normally has a cherry picker crane, allowing the operator to spray the entire aircraft in as little time as possible; an entire Boeing 737 can be treated in under 10 minutes by a single de-icing vehicle.

In road snow and ice control, brine is often used as an anti-icer rather than a de-icer. A vehicle carries a tank of brine, which is sprayed on the road surface before or at the onset of the storm. This keeps snow and ice from adhering to the surface and makes mechanical removal by plows easier. Solid salt is also wetted with brine or other liquid deicer. This speeds de-icing action and helps keep it from bouncing off the pavement into the gutter or ditch. Brine acts faster than solid salt and does not require compression by passing traffic to become effective. The brine is also more environmentally friendly, as less salt is required to treat the same length of road.

Airport runways are also de-iced by sprayers fitted with long spraying arms. These arms are wide enough to cross the entire runway, and allow de-icing of the entire airstrip to take place in a single pass, reducing the length of time that the runway is unavailable.

=== Front-end loader ===
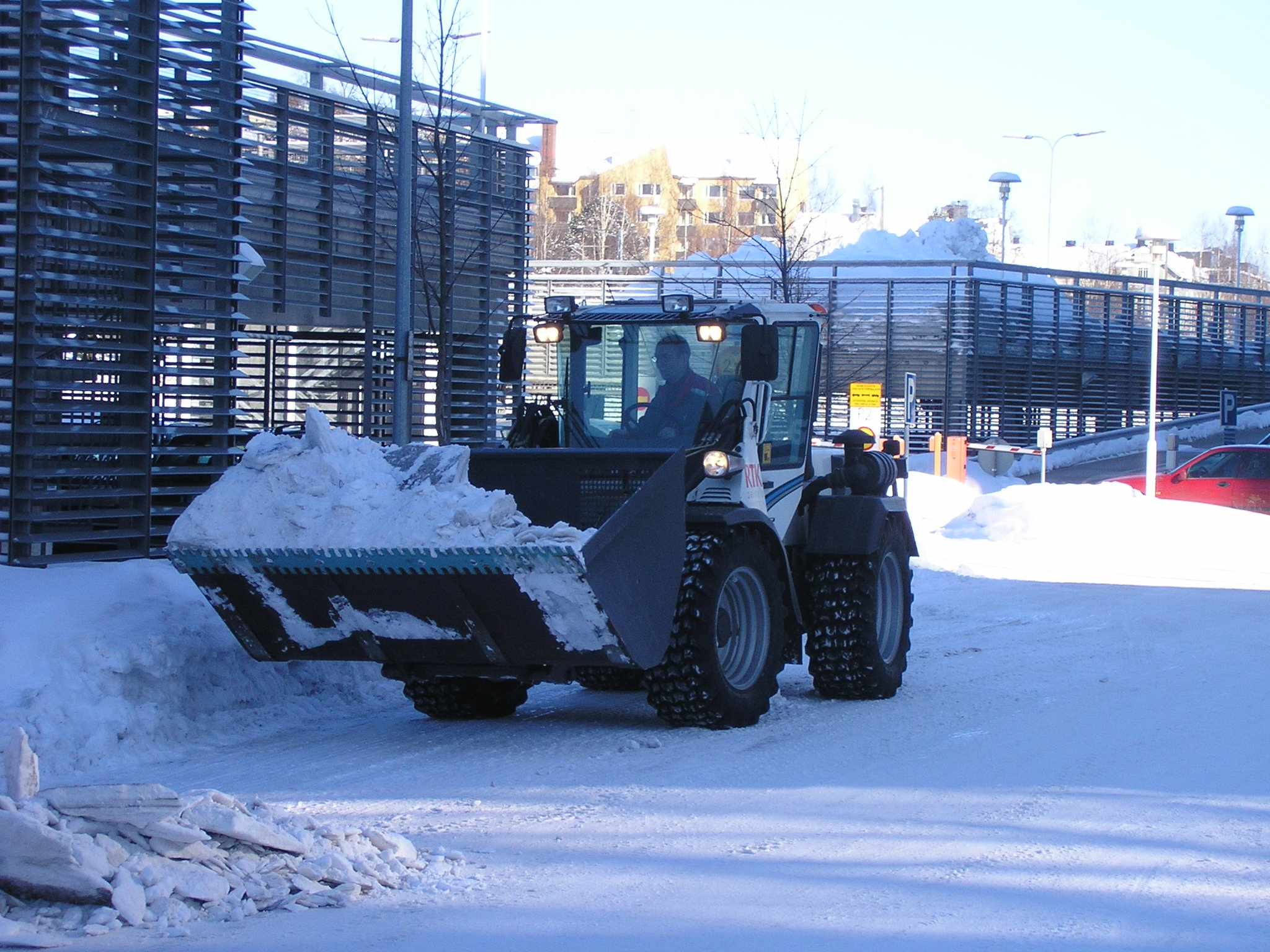
Loader removing snow in Jyväskylä, Finland

Front-end loaders are commonly used to remove snow especially from sidewalks, parking lots, and other areas too small for using snowplows and other heavy equipment. They are sometimes used as snowplows with a snowplow attachment but commonly have a bucket or snowbasket, which can also be used to load snow into the rear compartment of a snowplow or dump truck. Front end loaders with large box-like front end attachment are used to clear snow in parking lots in malls and other institutions.

=== Gritter ===
A gritter, also known as a sander, salt spreader or salt truck, is found on most winter service vehicles. Indeed, the gritter is so commonly seen on winter service vehicles that the terms are sometimes used synonymously. Gritters are used to spread grit (usually rock salt) onto roads. The grit is stored in the large hopper on the rear of the vehicle, with a wire mesh over the top to prevent foreign objects from entering the spreading mechanism and hence becoming jammed. The salt is generally spread across the roadway by an impeller, attached by a hydraulic drive system to a small onboard engine. However, until the 1970s, the grit was often spread by men with shovels riding on the back of the truck. Some older spreading mechanisms still require grit be manually loaded into the impeller from the hopper.

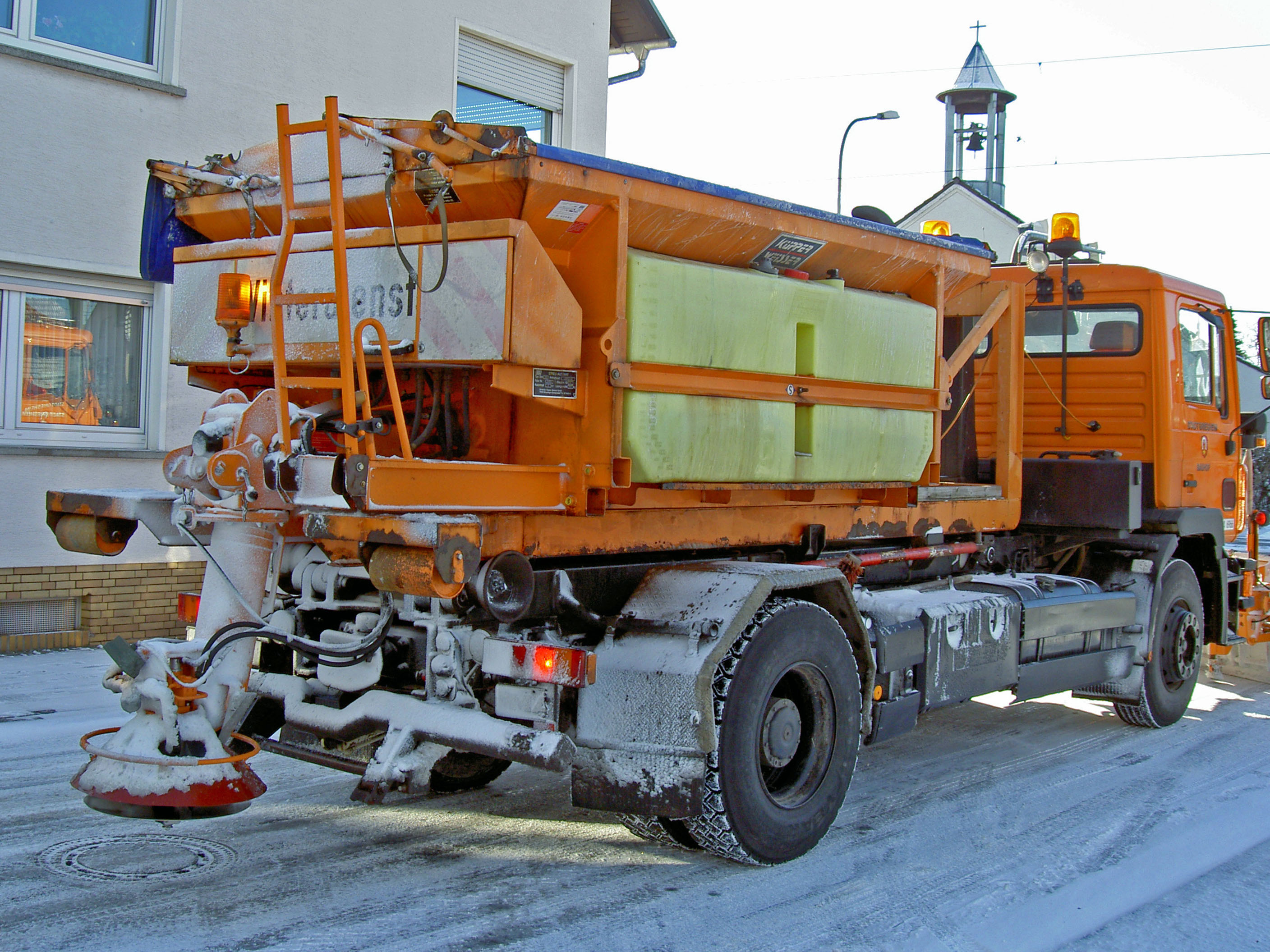
The hopper and impeller of a gritter in Germany

Salt reduces the melting point of ice by freezing-point depression, causing it to melt at lower temperatures and run off to the edge of the road, while sand increases traction by increasing friction between car tires and roadways. The amount of salt dropped varies with the condition of the road; to prevent the formation of light ice, approximately 10 g/m^{2} (2.0 lb/1000 sq ft; 0.018 lb/sq yd) is dropped, while thick snow can require up to 40 g/m^{2} (8.2 lb/1000 sq ft; 0.074 lb/sq yd) of salt, independent of the volume of sand dropped.

Gritters are among the winter service vehicles also used in airports, to keep runways free of ice. However, the salt normally used to clear roads can damage the airframe of aircraft and interferes with the sensitive navigation equipment. As a result, airport gritters spread less dangerous potassium acetate or urea onto the runways instead, as these do not corrode the aircraft or the airside equipment.

Gritters can also be used in hot weather, when temperatures are high enough to melt the bitumen used in asphalt. The grit is dropped to provide a protective layer between the road surface and the tires of passing vehicles, which would otherwise damage the road surface by "plucking out" the bitumen-coated aggregate from the road surface.

=== Snow blower ===
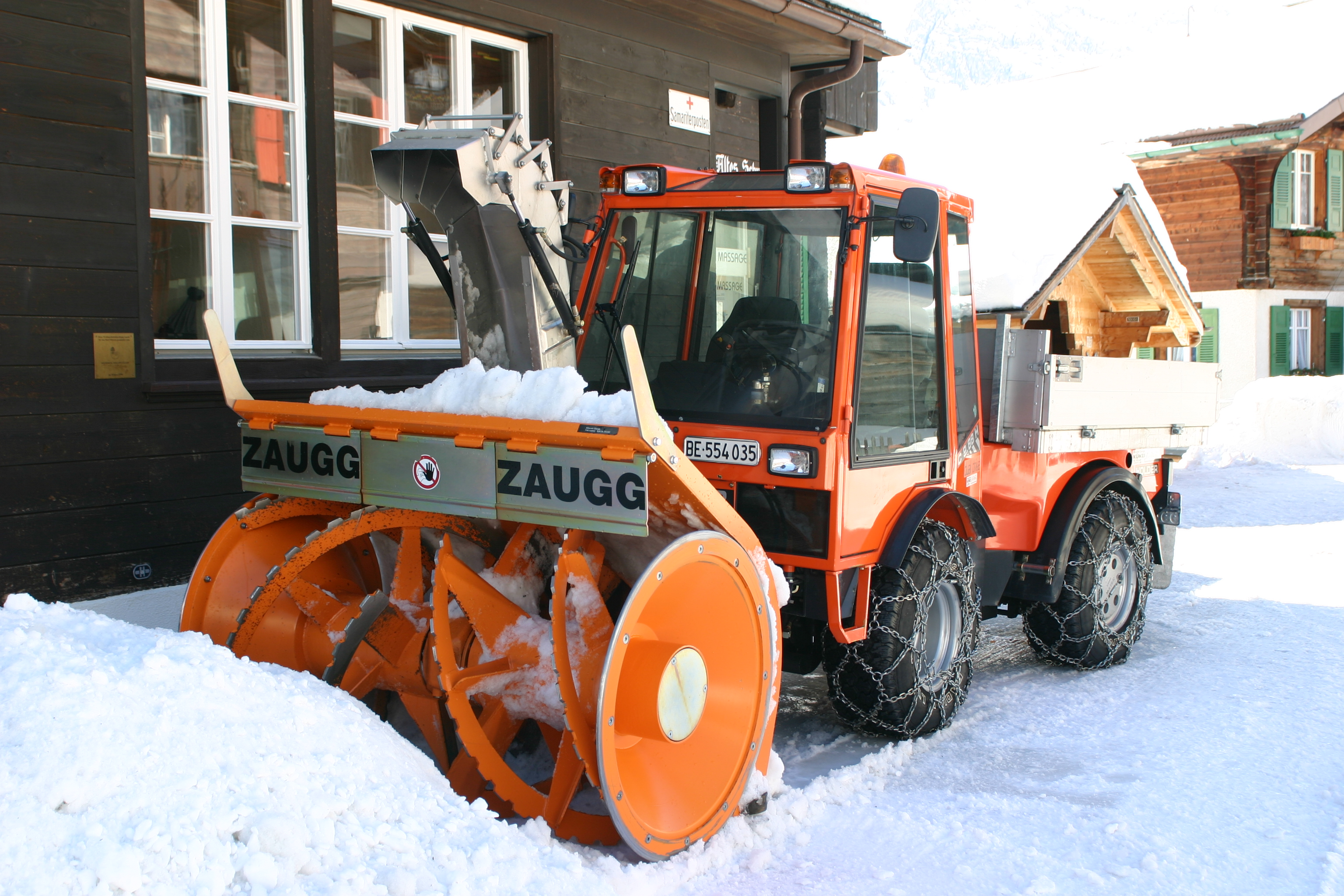
A Zaugg snow blower fitted with snow chains

Snow blowers, also known as rotating snowplows or snow cutters, can be used in place of snowplows on winter service vehicles. A snow blower consists of a rapidly spinning auger which cuts through the snow, forcing it out of a funnel attached to the top of the blower. Snow blowers typically clear much faster than plows, with some clearing in excess of 5,000 tonnes (4,900 long tons; 5,500 short tons) of snow per hour, and can cut through far deeper snow drifts than a snowplow can. In addition, snow blowers can remove snow from the roadway completely, rather than piling it at the side of the road, making passage easier for other road users and preventing the windrow from blocking driveways.

=== Jet-powered snow blower ===
Some railroads occasionally use air-blowing machines, each powered by a jet engine, to clear snow from tracks and switches. In addition to physically blowing snow with the force of the air, they melt recalcitrant precipitation with exhaust temperatures over 1,000 degrees Fahrenheit (538 °C). Approximately 100 are believed to have been manufactured in the 1960s, 1970s, and 1980s; they are used so rarely that they are generally maintained indefinitely rather than being replaced. For example, in the Boston area the MBTA uses two model RP-3 Portec RMC Hurricane Jet Snow Blowers, nicknamed "Snowzilla", to clear heavy snows from the Mattapan Line and Wellington Yard. The jet snow blowers can be faster and gentler than conventional removal methods, but they consume a large amount of fuel.

=== Snow groomer ===
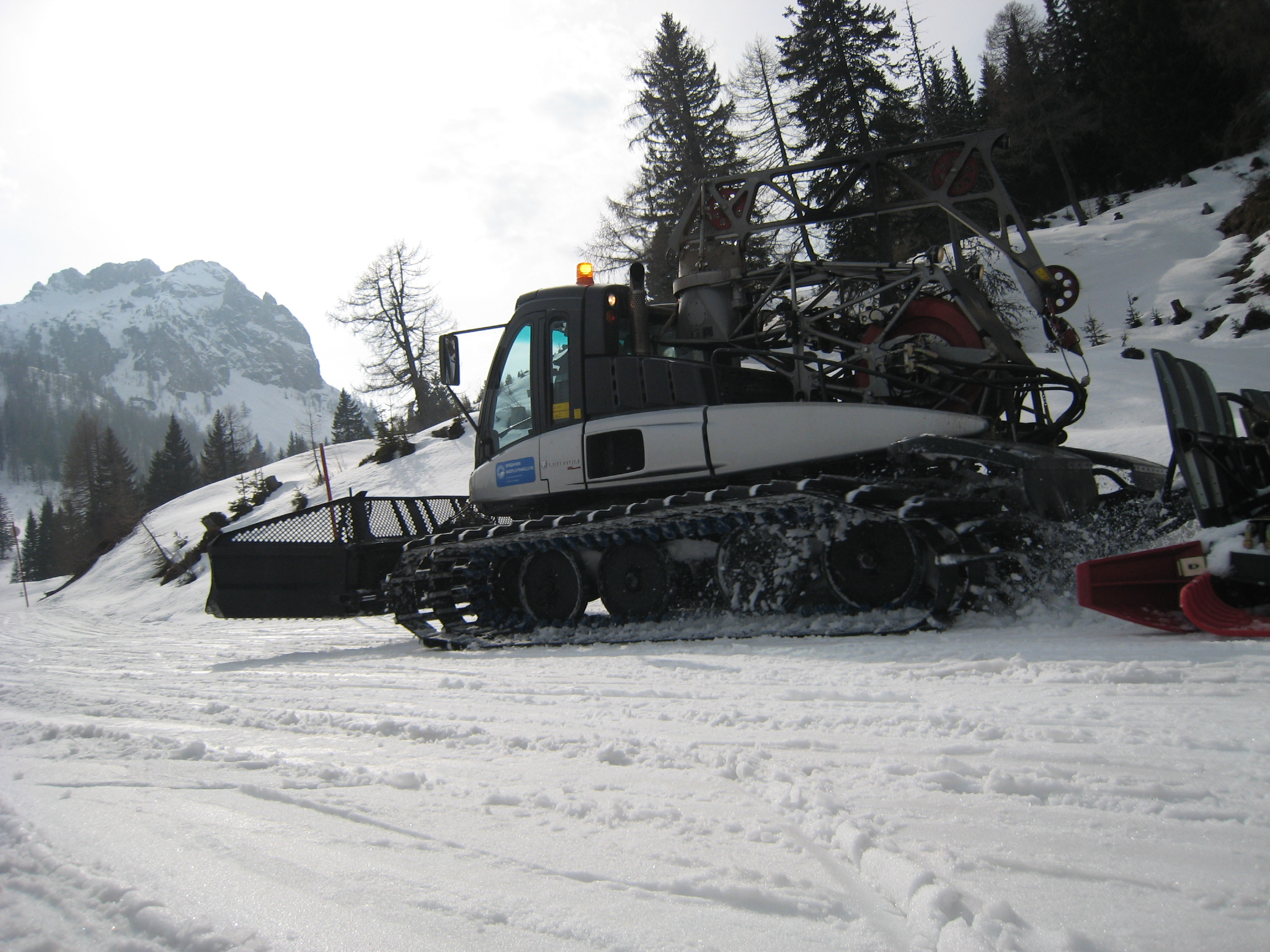
An Italian snowcat with grooming blade hauling a roller

A snow groomer is a machine designed to smooth and compact the snow, rather than removing it altogether. Early snow groomers were used by residents of rural areas to compress the snow close to their homes, and consisted of a heavy roller hauled by oxen which compacted the snow to make a smooth surface for sledging. With the invention of the motor car, snow groomers were replaced by snowplows and snow blowers on public thoroughfares, but remained in use at ski resorts, where they are used to maintain smooth, safe trails for various wintersports, including skiing, snowboarding and snowmobiling. Snow groomers remained unchanged throughout the 20th century, with most consisting of heavy roller which could be attached to a tractor or snowcat and then hauled across the area to be groomed.

The development of more advanced electronic systems in the 1980s allowed manufacturers to produce snow groomers which could work on and replicate a much wider range of terrains, with the most modern even able to produce half-pipes and ramps for snowboarding. Snow groomers are also used in conjunction with snow cannons, to ensure that the snow produced is spread evenly across the resort. However, snow groomers have a detrimental effect on the environment within the resort. Regular pressure from the grooming vehicle increases the infiltration rate of the soil while decreasing the field capacity. This increases the rate at which water can soak through the soil, making it more prone to erosion.

=== Snow melter ===
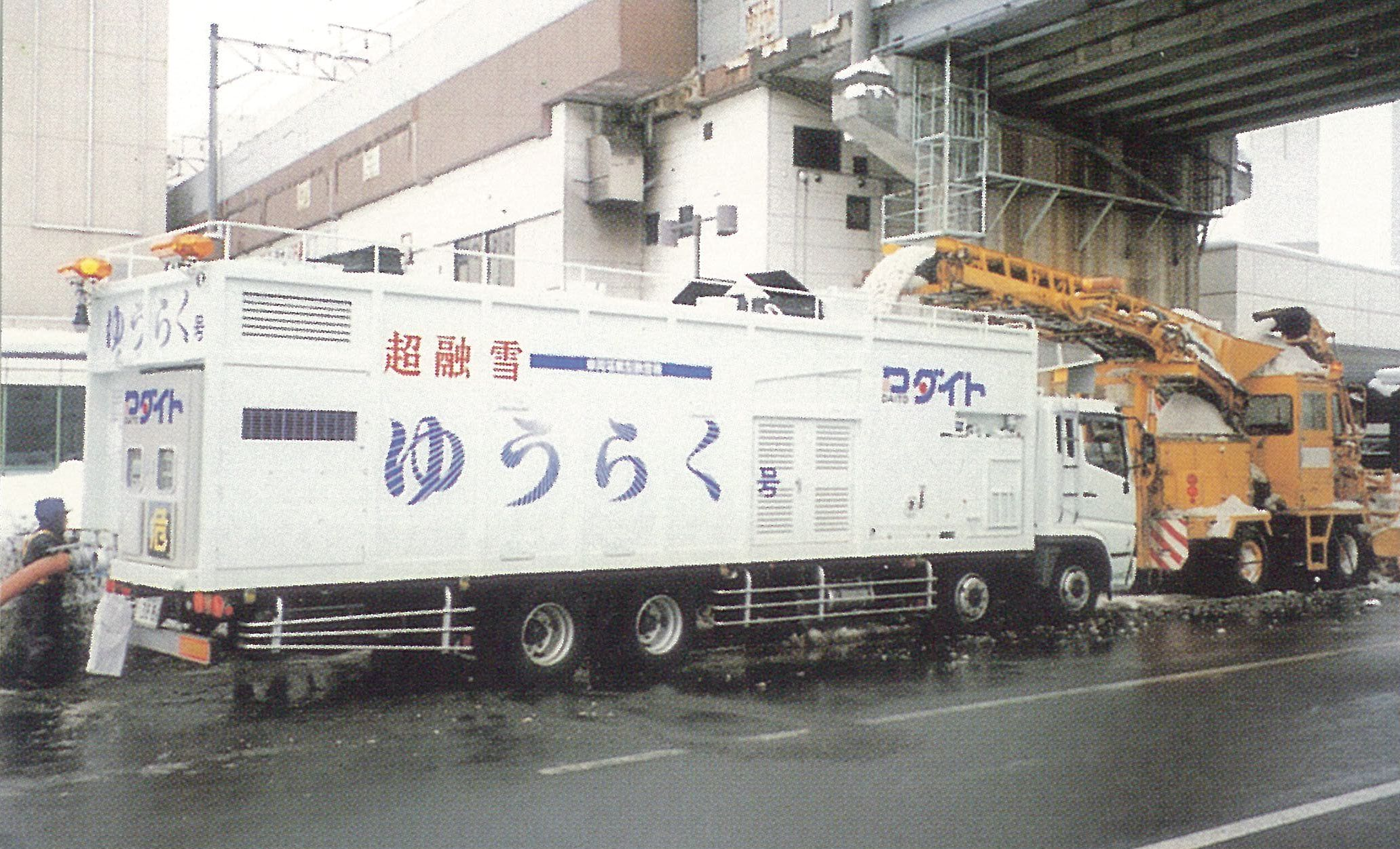
Snow melter working at Sapporo, Japan

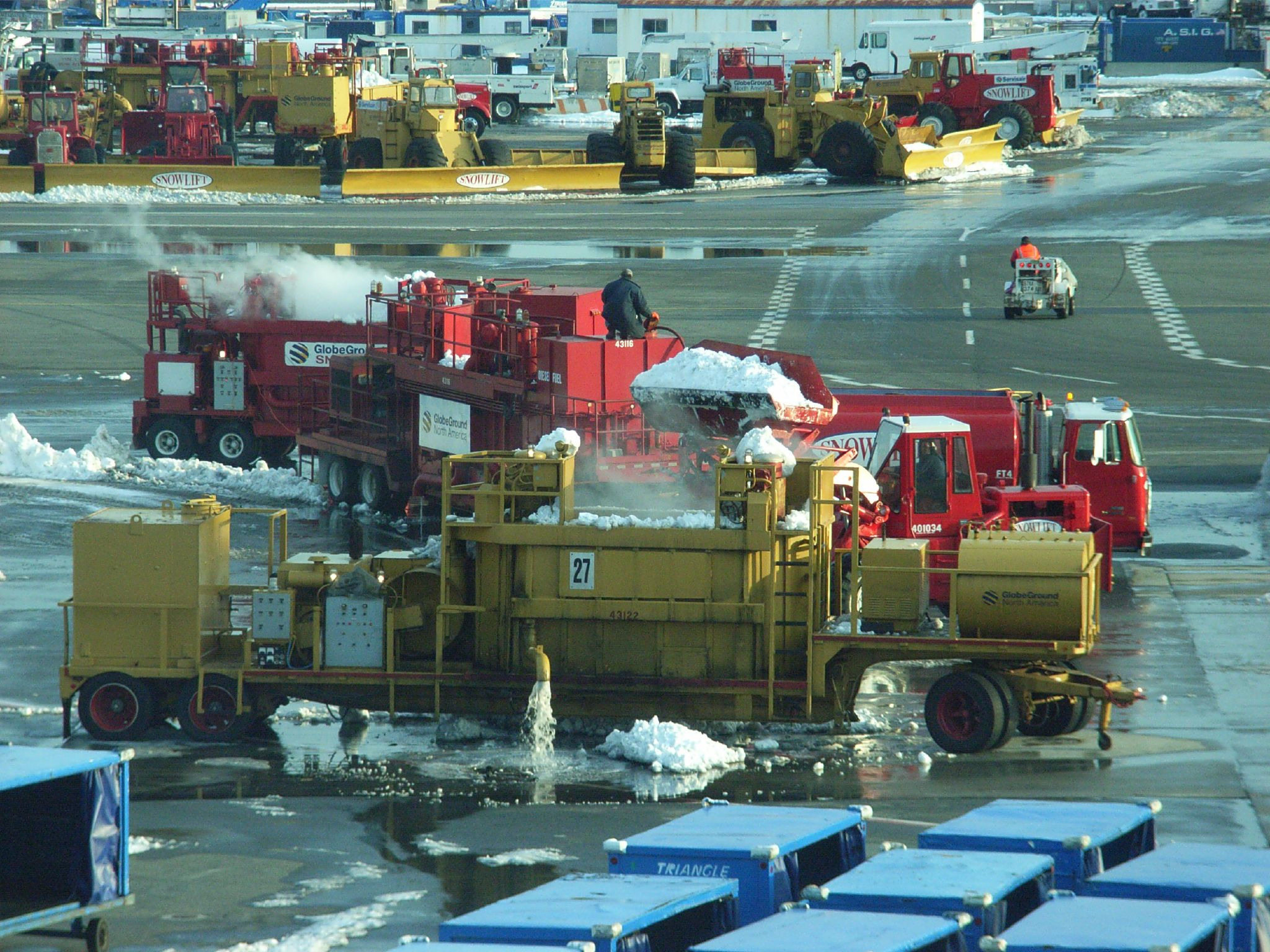
Snow melters working at JFK Airport, New York

A snow-melting vehicle works by scooping snow into a melting pit located in a large tank at the rear of the vehicle. Around the melting pit is a thin jacket full of warm water, heated by a powerful burner. The gases from the burner are bubbled through the water, causing some of the heated water to spill over into the melting pit, melting the snow instantly. The meltwater is discharged into the storm drains.

Because they have to carry the large water tank and fuel for the burner, snow melting machines tend to be much larger and heavier than most winter service vehicles, at around 18 metres (59 ft), with the largest being hauled by semi-trailer tractor units. In addition, the complicated melting process means that snow melting vehicles have a much lower capacity than the equivalent plow or blower vehicle; the largest snow melter can remove 500 metric tons of snow per hour, compared to the 5,000 metric tons per hour capacity of any large snow blower.

Snow melters are in some ways more environmentally friendly than gritters, as they do not spray hazardous materials, and pollutants from the road surface can be separated from the meltwater and disposed of safely. In addition, because the snow is melted on board, the costs of transporting snow from the site are eliminated. On the other hand, snow melting can require large amounts of energy, which has its own costs and environmental impact.

=== Snowplow ===
Video of winter service vehicle using frontal snowplow and underbody scraper in Alaska, with sand hopper mounted at rear

Many winter service vehicles can be fitted with snowplows, to clear roads which are blocked by deep snow. In most cases, the plows are mounted on hydraulically actuated arms, allowing them to be raised, lowered, and angled to better move snow. Most winter service vehicles include either permanently fixed plows or plow frames: 75% of the UK's Highways Agency vehicles include a plow frame to which a blade can be attached. Winter service vehicles with both a plow frame and a gritting body are known as "all purpose vehicles", and while these are more efficient than using dedicated vehicles, the weight of the hopper often decreases the range of the vehicle. Therefore, most operators will keep at least a few dedicated plowing vehicles in store for heavy storms.

In the event that specially designed winter service vehicles are not available for plowing, other service or construction vehicles can be used instead: among those used by various authorities are graders, bulldozers, skid loaders, pickup trucks and rubbish trucks. Front-end loaders can also be used to plow snow. Either a snowplow attachment can be mounted on the loader's arm in place of the bucket, or the bucket or snowbasket can be used to load snow into the rear compartment of a snowplow or dump truck, which then hauls it away. Snowplows are dangerous to overtake; often, the oncoming lane may not be completely free of snow. In addition, the plow blade causes considerable spray of snow on both sides, which can obscure the vision of other road users.

=== Snow sweeper ===
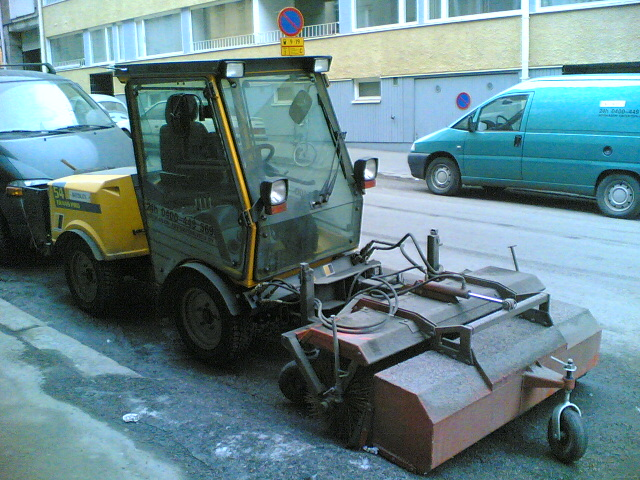
Sand sweeper in Helsinki, Finland

A snow sweeper uses brushes to remove thin layers of snow from the pavement surface. Snow sweepers are used after plowing to remove any remaining material missed by the larger vehicles in areas with very low snow-tolerance, such as airport runways and racing tracks, as the flexible brushes follow the terrain better than the rigid blades of snowplows and snow blowers. These brushes also allow the vehicle to be used on the tactile tiles found at traffic lights and tram stops, without damaging the delicate surface. Unlike other winter service vehicles, snow sweepers do not compress the snow, leaving a rough, high friction, surface behind them. This makes snow sweepers the most efficient method of snow removal for snow depths below 10 centimetres (3.9 in). Snow deeper than this, however, can clog the brushes, and most snow sweepers cannot be used to clear snow deeper than 15 centimetres (5.9 in). A more advanced version of the snow sweeper is the jet sweeper, which adds an air-blower just behind the brushes, in order to blow the swept snow clear of the pavement and prevent the loosened snow from settling.

=== Surface friction tester ===
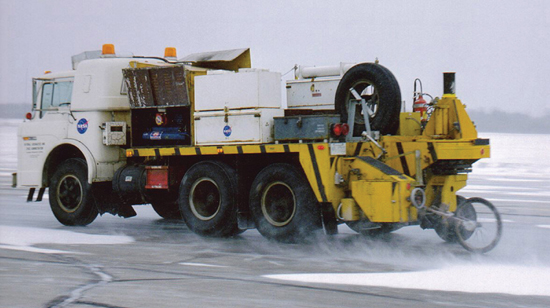
A NASA surface friction tester at Langley Air Force Base; the extra wheel for testing is clearly visible at the rear.

The surface friction tester is a small fifth wheel attached to a hydraulic system mounted on the rear axle of the vehicle, used to measure road slipperiness. The wheel, allowed to roll freely, is slightly turned relative to the ground so that it partially slides. Sensors attached to the axis of the wheel calculate the friction between the wheel and the pavement by measuring the torque produced by the rotation of the wheel. Surface friction testers are used at airports and on major roadways before ice formation or after snow removal. The vehicle can relay the surface friction data back to the control centre, allowing gritting and clearing to be planned so that the vehicles are deployed most efficiently. Surface friction testers often include a water spraying system, to simulate the effects of rain on the road surface before the rain occurs. The sensors are usually mounted to small compact or estate cars or to a small trailer, rather than the large trucks used for other winter service equipment, as the surface friction tester works best when attached to a lightweight vehicle.

== Materials ==
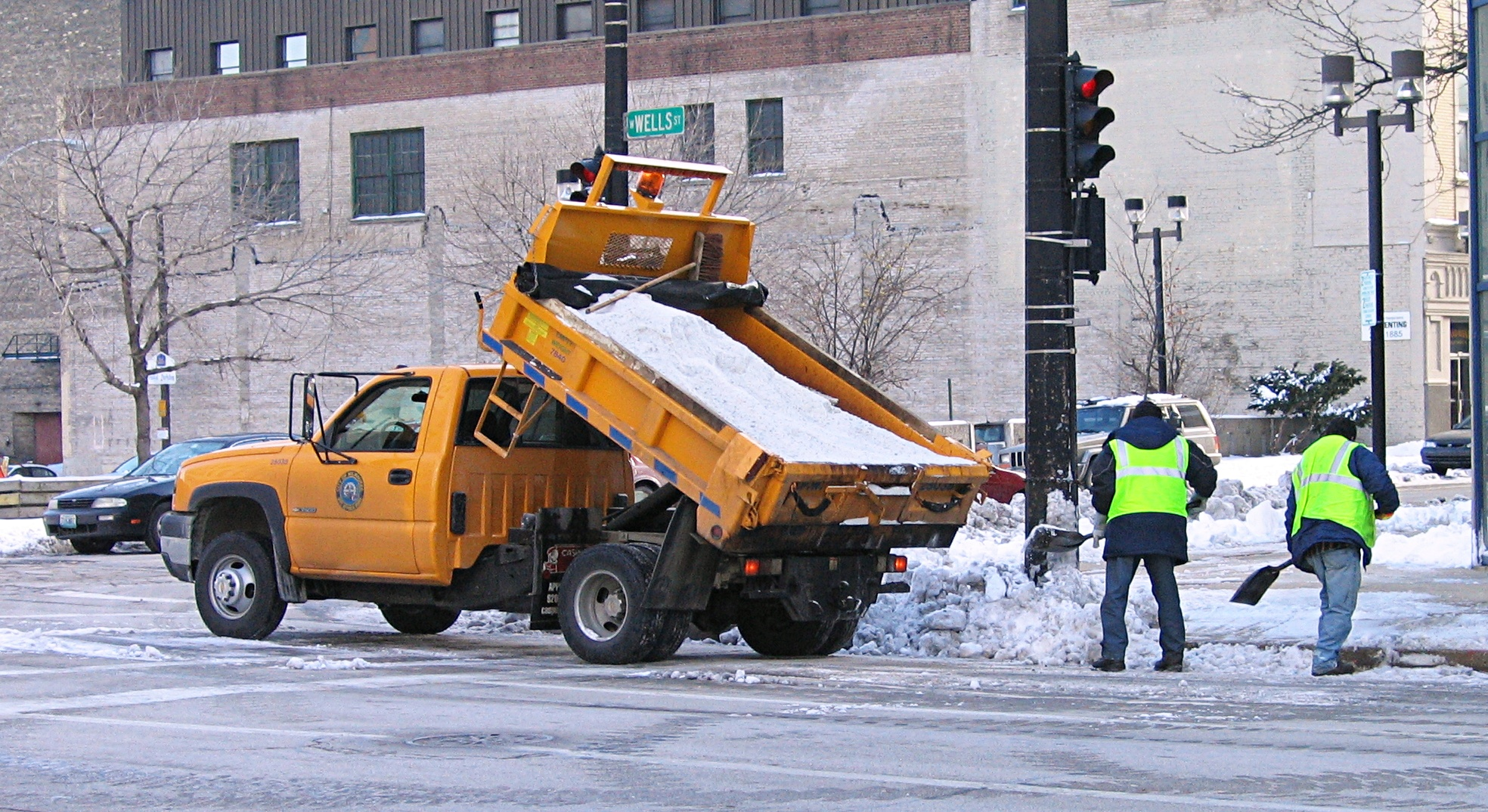
Salt being spread manually from a dump truck by workers in Milwaukee, Wisconsin

To improve traction and melt ice or snow, winter service vehicles spread granular or liquid ice-melting chemicals and grit, such as sand or gravel.

The most common chemical is rock salt, which can melt snow at high temperatures but has some unwanted side effects. If the salt concentration becomes high enough, it can be toxic to plant and animal life and greatly accelerate corrosion of metals, so operators should limit gritting to an absolute minimum. The dropped salt is eventually washed away and lost, so it may not be reused or collected after gritting runs. By contrast, the insoluble sand can be collected and recycled by street sweeping vehicles and mixed with new salt crystals to be reused in later batches of grit.

Sea salt may not be used, as it is too fine and dissolves too quickly, so all salt used in gritting comes from salt mines, a non-renewable source. As a result, some road maintenance agencies have networks of ice prediction stations, to prevent unnecessary gritting, which not only wastes salt but can also damage the environment and disrupt traffic.

The U.S. state of Oregon uses magnesium chloride, a relatively inexpensive chemical similar in snow-melting effects to sodium chloride, but less reactive, while New Zealand uses calcium magnesium acetate, which avoids the environmentally harmful chloride ion altogether. Urea is sometimes used to grit suspension bridges, as it does not corrode iron or steel at all, but urea is less effective than salt and can cost up to seven times more, weight-for-weight.

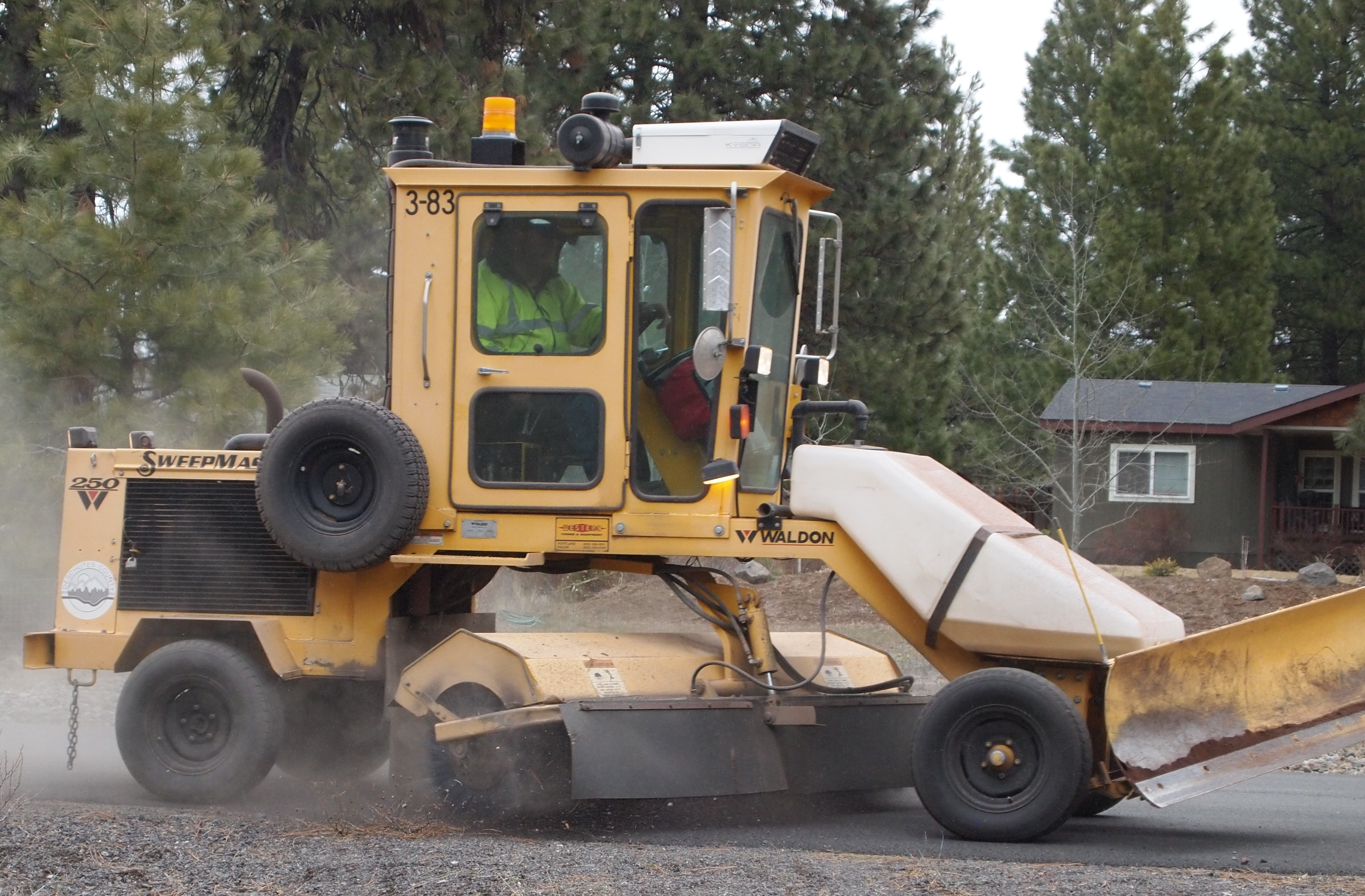
Gravel spread on roads during winter is swept in spring in Deschutes County, Oregon.

In some areas of the world, including Berlin, Germany, dropping salt is prohibited altogether except on the highest-risk roads; plain sand without any melting agents is spread instead. While this may protect the environment, it is more labour-intensive, as more gritting runs are needed; because the sand is insoluble, it tends to accumulate at the sides of the road, making it more difficult for buses to pull in at bus stops.

Grit is often mixed with hydrous sodium ferrocyanide as an anticaking agent which, while harmless in its natural form, can undergo photodissociation in strong sunlight to produce the extremely toxic chemical hydrogen cyanide. Although sunlight is generally not intense enough to cause this in polar and temperate regions, salt deposits must kept as far as possible from waterways to avert the possibility of cyanide-tainted runoff water entering fisheries or farms.

Gritting vehicles are also dangerous to overtake; as grit is scattered across the entire roadway, loose pieces can damage the paintwork and windows of passing cars. Loose salt does not provide sufficient traction for motorcycles, which can lead to skidding, especially around corners.

== See also ==
- Snow emergency
- Snowplow
- Snow removal
- Wedge plow
