= Hydrohalite =

General
- Category: Halide mineral
- Formula: NaCl·2H_{2}O
- IMA symbol: Hhl
- Strunz classification: 3.BA.05
- Dana classification: 9.1.2.1
- Crystal system: Monoclinic
- Crystal class: Prismatic (2/m) (same H-M symbol)
- Space group: P2_{1}/c

Identification
- Colour: Colourless or white
- Diaphaneity: Transparent

Hydrohalite is a halide mineral that occurs in saturated halite brines at cold temperatures (below 0.1 °C) and is the most common form of hydrated sodium chloride. It was first described in 1847 from an occurrence in Dürrnberg, Austria.

== Physical properties ==
Hydrohalite has a high nucleation energy, it decomposes at 0.1°C, giving a salty brine and solid halite.

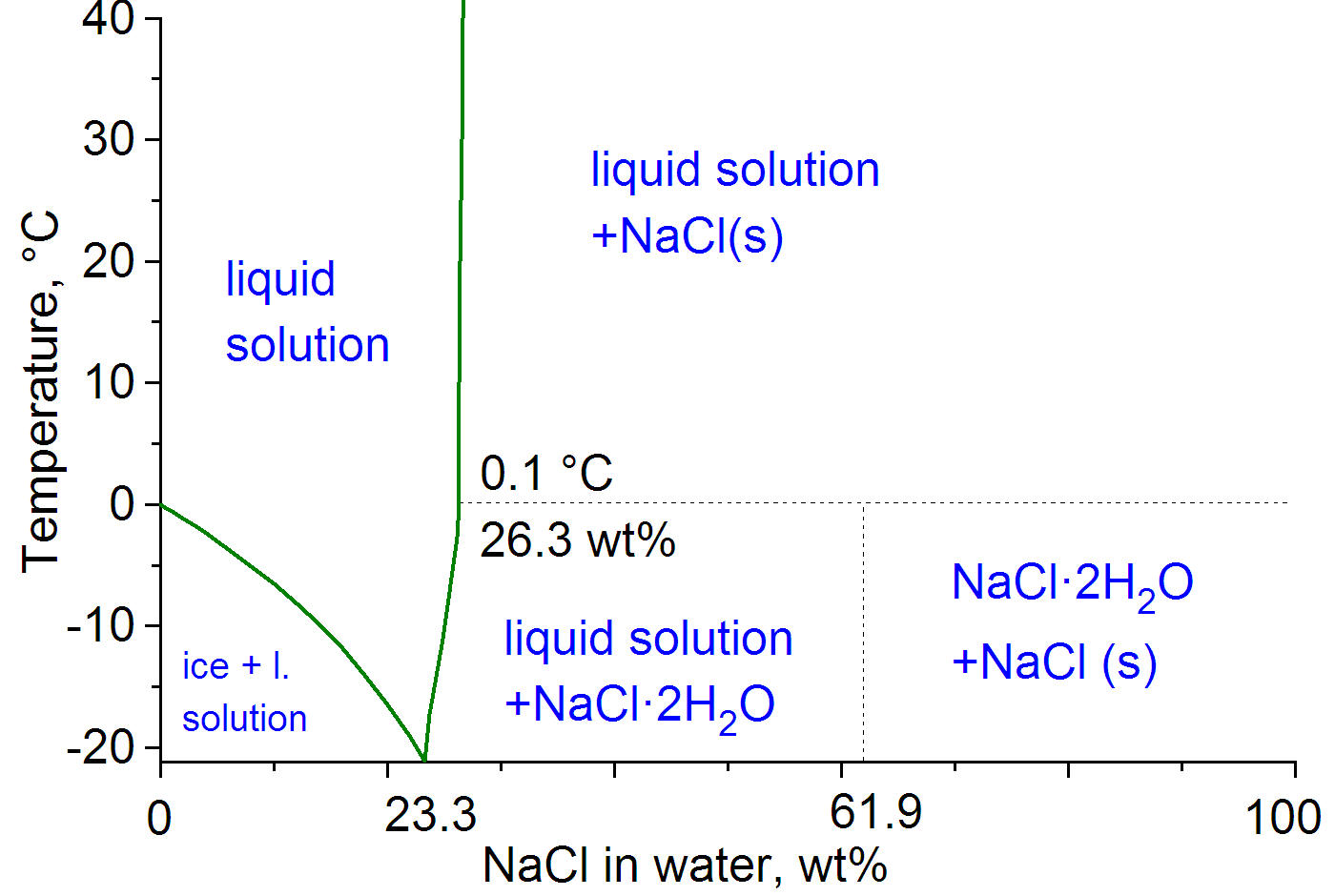
Phase diagram of water–NaCl mixture

The cryohydric point of hydrohalite is at −21.2 °C (−6.2 °F), solutions will normally need to be supercooled for crystals to form. Above this temperature, liquid water saturated with salt can exist in equilibrium with hydrohalite. Unlike halite, hydrohalite has a strong positive temperature coefficient of solubility. Under pressure, hydrohalite is stable between 7,900 and 11,600 atmospheres pressure. The decomposition point increases at the rate of 0.007K per atmosphere (for 1–1000 atmospheres), reaching a maximum decomposition temperature is at 25.8°C around 9400 atmospheres. The decomposition temperature reduces again at higher pressures.

== Occurrence ==
The type locality is the Hallein Salt Mine in Austria.

=== Ceres ===
Hydrohalite was discovered on Ceres by Dawn, suggesting an early ocean, possibly surviving as a relict ocean.
