= Sodium chloride =

Chemical compound with formula NaCl

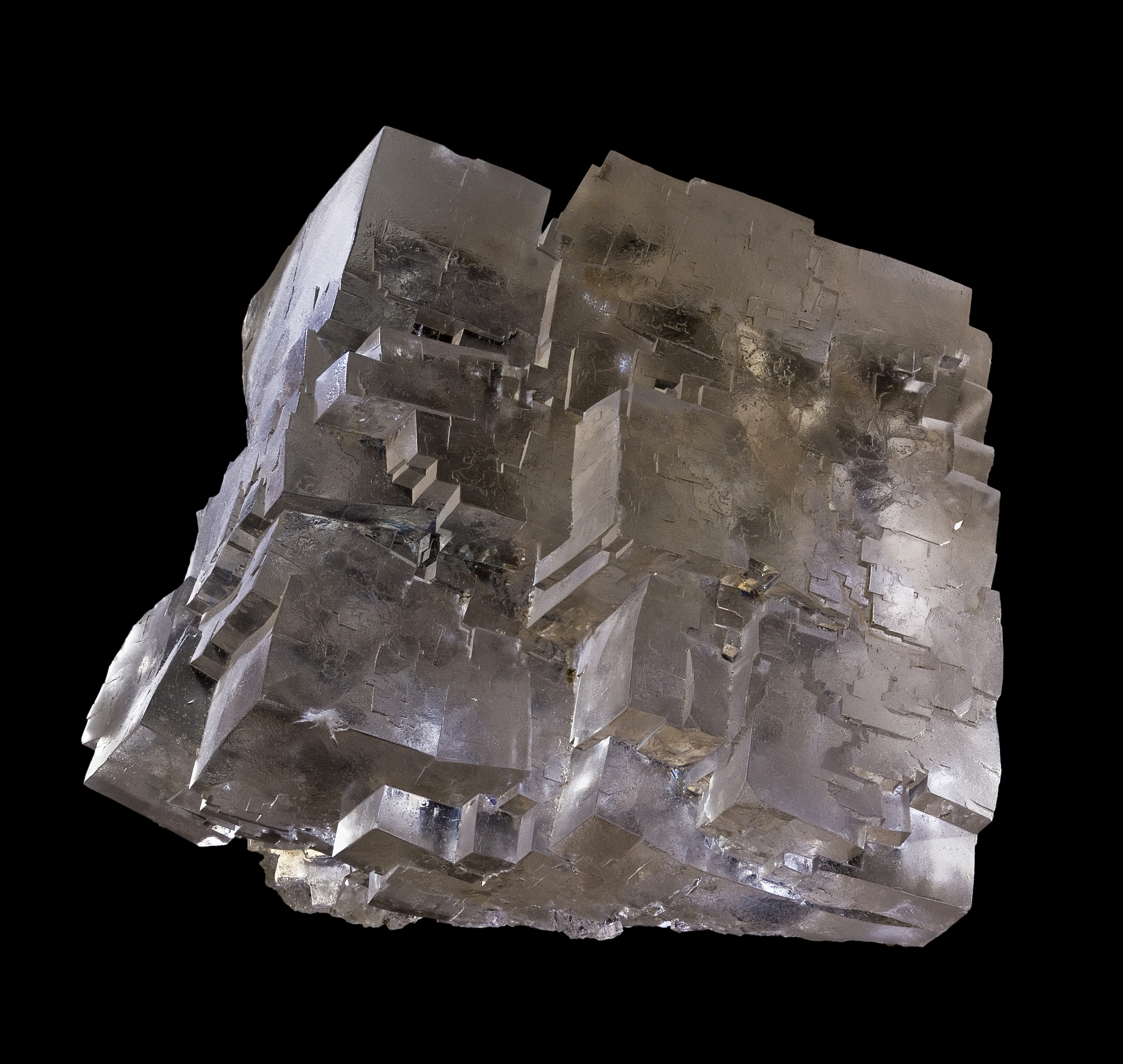
- Sodium chloride crystals in a form of halite

- Crystal structure with sodium in purple and chloride in green

Names
- IUPAC name Sodium chloride
- Other names: common salt, regular salt; halite, rock salt; table salt, sea salt; saline

Identifiers
CAS Number	7647-14-5
3D model (JSmol)	Interactive image
Beilstein Reference	3534976
ChEBI	CHEBI:26710
ChEMBL	ChEMBL1200574
ChemSpider	5044
ECHA InfoCard	100.028.726
EC Number	231-598-3
Gmelin Reference	13673
KEGG	D02056
MeSH	Sodium+chloride
PubChem CID	5234
RTECS number	VZ4725000
UNII	451W47IQ8X
CompTox Dashboard (EPA)	DTXSID3021271
- InChI: InChI=1S/ClH.Na/h1H;/q;+1/p-1 Key: FAPWRFPIFSIZLT-UHFFFAOYSA-M; InChI=1/ClH.Na/h1H;/q;+1/p-1 Key: FAPWRFPIFSIZLT-REWHXWOFAE
- SMILES: [Na+].[Cl-]

Properties
Chemical formula	NaCl
Molar mass	58.44 g·mol^{-1}
Appearance	Colorless cubic crystals
Odor	Faint, salty (when powdered), or odorless (solid rock)
Density	2.17 g/cm^{3}
Melting point	800.7 °C (1,473.3 °F; 1,073.8 K)
Boiling point	1,413 °C (2,575 °F; 1,686 K)
Solubility in water	360 g/L (25 °C)
Solubility in ammonia	21.5 g/L
Solubility in methanol	13.75 g/L
Magnetic susceptibility (χ)	−30.2·10^{−6} cm^{3}/mol
Refractive index (n_{D})	1.5441 (at 589 nm)

Structure
Crystal structure	Face-centered cubic (see text), cF8
Space group	Fm3̅m (No. 225)
Lattice constant	a = 564.02 pm
Formula units (Z)	4
Coordination geometry	octahedral at Na^{+} octahedral at Cl^{−}

Thermochemistry
Heat capacity (C)	50.5 J/(K·mol)
Std molar entropy (S^{⦵}_{298})	72.10 J/(K·mol)
Std enthalpy of formation (Δ_{f}H^{⦵}_{298})	−411.120 kJ/mol

Pharmacology
ATC code	A12CA01 (WHO) B05CB01 (WHO), B05XA03 (WHO), S01XA03 (WHO)

Hazards
NFPA 704 (fire diamond)	0 0 0
- Lethal dose or concentration (LD, LC)
LD_{50} (median dose)	3 g/kg (oral, rats)

Related compounds
Other anions	Sodium fluoride Sodium bromide Sodium iodide Sodium astatide
Other cations	Lithium chloride Potassium chloride Rubidium chloride Caesium chloride Francium chloride

Supplementary data page
- Sodium chloride (data page)
- Except where otherwise noted, data are given for materials in their standard state (at 25 °C [77 °F], 100 kPa). verify (what is ?) Infobox references

Sodium chloride /ˌsoʊdiəm ˈklɔːraɪd/, is an ionic compound with the chemical formula NaCl, representing a 1:1 ratio of sodium and chloride ions. It is transparent or translucent, brittle, hygroscopic, and occurs as the mineral halite. In its edible form, common table salt, it is commonly used as a condiment and food preservative. Large quantities of sodium chloride are used in many industrial processes, and it is a major source of sodium and chlorine compounds used as feedstocks for further chemical syntheses. Another major application of sodium chloride is de-icing of roadways in sub-freezing weather.

== Uses ==
In addition to the many familiar domestic uses of salt, more dominant applications of the approximately 250 million tonnes per year production (2008 data) include chemicals and de-icing.

=== Chemical functions ===
Salt is used, directly or indirectly, in the production of many chemicals, which consumes most of the world's production.

==== Chlor-alkali industry ====
It is the starting point for the chloralkali process, the industrial process to produce chlorine and sodium hydroxide, according to the chemical equation:

$$\ce{2 NaCl{} + 2 H2O ->[\text{electrolysis}] Cl2{} + H2{} + 2 NaOH}$$

This electrolysis is conducted in either a mercury cell, a diaphragm cell, or a membrane cell. Each of those uses a different method to separate the chlorine from the sodium hydroxide. Other technologies are under development due to the high energy consumption of the electrolysis, whereby small improvements in the efficiency can have large economic paybacks. Some applications of chlorine include PVC thermoplastics production, disinfectants, and solvents.

Sodium hydroxide is extensively used in many different industries enabling production of paper, soap, aluminum, and more.

=== Soda-ash industry ===
Sodium chloride is used in the Solvay process to produce sodium carbonate and calcium chloride. Sodium carbonate, in turn, is used to produce glass, sodium bicarbonate, and dyes, as well as a myriad of other chemicals. In the Mannheim process, sodium chloride is used for the production of sodium sulfate and hydrochloric acid.

=== Miscellaneous industrial uses ===
Sodium chloride is heavily used, so even relatively minor applications can consume massive quantities. In oil and gas exploration, salt is an important component of drilling fluids in well drilling. It is used to flocculate and increase the density of the drilling fluid to overcome high downwell gas pressures. Whenever a drill hits a salt formation, salt is added to the drilling fluid to saturate the solution in order to minimize the dissolution within the salt stratum. Salt is also used to increase the curing of concrete in cemented casings.

In textiles and dyeing, salt is used as a brine rinse to separate organic contaminants, to promote "salting out" of dyestuff precipitates, and to blend with concentrated dyes to increase yield in dyebaths and make the colors look sharper. One of its main roles is to provide the positive ion charge to promote the absorption of negatively charged ions of dyes.

For use in the pulp and paper industry, it is used to manufacture sodium chlorate, which is then reacted with sulfuric acid and a reducing agent such as methanol to manufacture chlorine dioxide, a bleaching chemical that is widely used to bleach wood pulp.

In tanning and leather treatment, salt is added to animal hides to inhibit microbial activity on the underside of the hides and to attract moisture back into the hides.

In rubber manufacture, salt is used to make buna, neoprene, and white rubber types. Salt brine and sulfuric acid are used to coagulate an emulsified latex made from chlorinated butadiene.

Salt also is added to secure the soil and to provide firmness to the foundation on which highways are built. The salt acts to minimize the effects of shifting caused in the subsurface by changes in humidity and traffic load.

=== Water softening ===
Hard water contains calcium and magnesium ions that interfere with action of soap and contribute to the buildup of a scale or film of alkaline mineral deposits in household and industrial equipment and pipes. Commercial and residential water-softening units use ion-exchange resins to remove ions that cause the hardness. These resins are generated and regenerated using sodium chloride.

=== Road salt ===
The second major application of salt is for deicing and anti-icing of roads, both in grit bins and spread by winter service vehicles. In anticipation of snowfall, roads are optimally "anti-iced" with brine (concentrated solution of salt in water), which prevents bonding between the snow-ice and the road surface. This procedure obviates the heavy use of salt after the snowfall. For deicing, mixtures of brine and salt are used, sometimes with additional agents such as calcium chloride and/or magnesium chloride. The use of salt or brine becomes ineffective below −10 °C (14 °F).

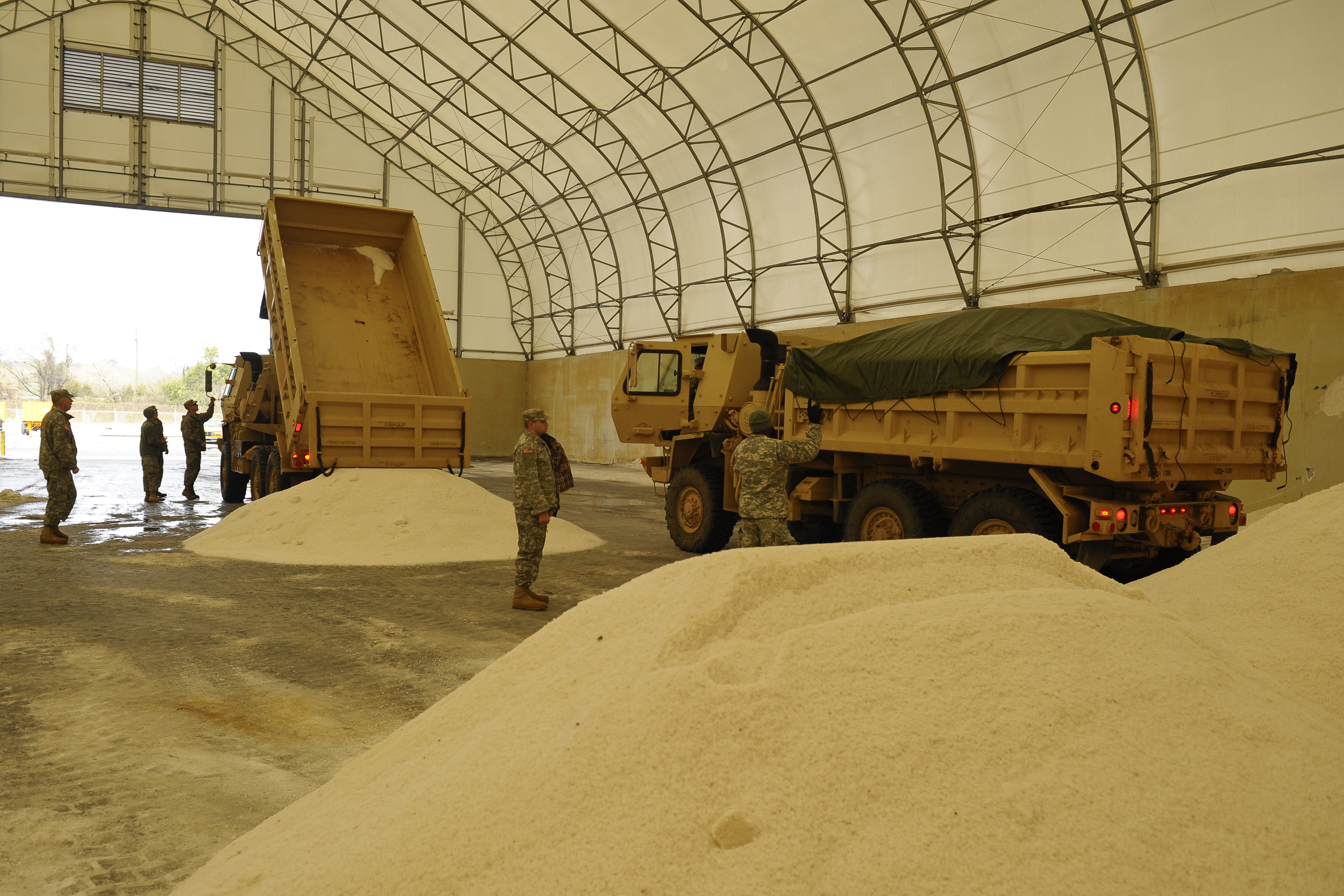
Mounds of road salt for use in winter

Salt for deicing in the United Kingdom predominantly comes from a single mine in Winsford in Cheshire. Prior to distribution it is mixed with <100 ppm of sodium ferrocyanide as an anticaking agent, which enables rock salt to flow freely out of the gritting vehicles despite being stockpiled prior to use. In recent years this additive has also been used in table salt. Other additives have been used in road salt to reduce the total costs. For example, in the US, a byproduct carbohydrate solution from sugar-beet processing was mixed with rock salt and adhered to road surfaces about 40% better than loose rock salt alone. Because it stayed on the road longer, the treatment did not have to be repeated several times, saving time and money.

In the technical terms of physical chemistry, the minimum freezing point of a water-salt mixture is −21.12 °C (−6.02 °F) for 23.31 wt% of salt. Freezing near this concentration is however so slow that the eutectic point of −22.4 °C (−8.3 °F) can be reached with about 25 wt% of salt.

==== Environmental effects ====
Road salt ends up in fresh-water bodies and could harm aquatic plants and animals by disrupting their osmoregulation ability. The omnipresence of salt in coastal areas poses a problem in any coating application, because trapped salts cause great problems in adhesion. Naval authorities and ship builders monitor the salt concentrations on surfaces during construction. Maximal salt concentrations on surfaces are dependent on the authority and application. The IMO regulation is mostly used and sets salt levels to a maximum of 50 mg/m^{2} soluble salts measured as sodium chloride. These measurements are done by means of a Bresle test. Salinization (increasing salinity, aka freshwater salinization syndrome) and subsequent increased metal leaching is an ongoing problem throughout North America and European fresh waterways.

In highway de-icing, salt has been associated with corrosion of bridge decks, motor vehicles, reinforcement bar and wire, and unprotected steel structures used in road construction. Surface runoff, vehicle spraying, and windblown salt also affect soil, roadside vegetation, and local surface water and groundwater supplies. Although evidence of environmental loading of salt has been found during peak usage, the spring rains and thaws usually dilute the concentrations of sodium in the area where salt was applied. A 2009 study found that approximately 70% of the road salt being applied in the Minneapolis-St Paul metro area is retained in the local watershed.

==== Substitution ====
Some agencies are substituting beer, molasses, and beet juice instead of road salt. Airlines utilize more glycol and sugar rather than salt-based solutions for deicing.

=== Food industry and agriculture ===
Commonly known as table salt, salt is added to food, either by the food producer or by the consumer, as a flavor enhancer, preservative, binder, fermentation-control additive, texture-control agent, and color developer. The salt consumption in the food industry is subdivided, in descending order of consumption, into other food processing, meat packers, canning, baking, dairy, and grain mill products. Salt is added to promote color development in bacon, ham and other processed meat products. As a preservative, salt inhibits the growth of bacteria. Salt acts as a binder in sausages to form a binding gel made up of meat, fat, and moisture. Salt also acts as a flavor enhancer and as a tenderizer.

It is used as a cheap and safe desiccant because of its hygroscopic properties, making salting an effective method of food preservation historically; the salt draws water out of bacteria through osmotic pressure, keeping it from reproducing, a major source of food spoilage. Even though more effective desiccants are available, few are safe for humans to ingest. Many microorganisms cannot live in a salty environment: water is drawn out of their cells by osmosis. For this reason salt is used to preserve some foods, such as bacon, fish, or cabbage.

In many dairy industries, salt is added to cheese as a color-, fermentation-, and texture-control agent. The dairy subsector includes companies that manufacture creamery butter, condensed and evaporated milk, frozen desserts, ice cream, natural and processed cheese, and specialty dairy products. In canning, salt is primarily added as a flavor enhancer and preservative. It also is used as a carrier for other ingredients, dehydrating agent, enzyme inhibitor and tenderizer. In baking, salt is added to control the rate of fermentation in bread dough. It also is used to strengthen the gluten (the elastic protein-water complex in certain doughs) and as a flavor enhancer, such as a topping on baked goods. The food-processing category also contains grain mill products. These products consist of milling flour and rice and manufacturing cereal breakfast food and blended or prepared flour. Salt is also used a seasoning agent in products such as potato chips, pretzels, and cat and dog food.

Sodium chloride is used in veterinary medicine as emesis-causing agent. It is given as warm saturated solution. Emesis can also be caused by pharyngeal placement of small amount of plain salt or salt crystals.

For watering plants to use sodium chloride (NaCl) as a fertilizer, moderate concentration is used to avoid potential toxicity: 1–3 grams (0.035–0.106 oz) per liter is generally safe and effective for most plants.

=== Medicine ===
Sodium chloride is used together with water as one of the primary solutions for intravenous therapy. Nasal spray often contains a saline solution.

Sodium chloride is also available as an oral tablet and is taken to treat low sodium levels.

=== Firefighting ===
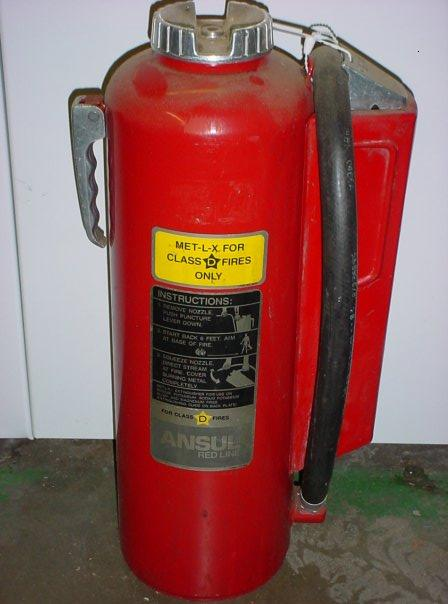
A class-D fire extinguisher for various metals

Sodium chloride is the principal extinguishing agent in dry-powder fire extinguishers that are used on combustible metal fires, for metals such as magnesium, zirconium, titanium, and lithium (Class D extinguishers). The salt forms an oxygen-excluding crust that smothers the fire.

=== Cleanser ===
Since at least medieval times, people have used salt as a cleansing agent rubbed on household surfaces. It is also used in many brands of shampoo and toothpaste and is commonly used to deice driveways, parking lots, and walkways.

=== Infrared optics ===
Sodium chloride crystals have a transmittance of at least 90% (through 1 mm) for infrared light having wavelengths in the range 0.2–18 μm. They were used in optical components such as windows and lenses, where few non-absorbing alternatives existed in that spectral range. While inexpensive, NaCl crystals are soft and hygroscopic – when exposed to the water in ambient air, they gradually cover with "frost". This limits application of NaCl to dry environments, vacuum-sealed areas, or short-term uses such as prototyping. Materials that are mechanically stronger and less sensitive to moisture, such as zinc selenide and chalcogenide glasses, are more widely used than NaCl.

== Chemistry ==
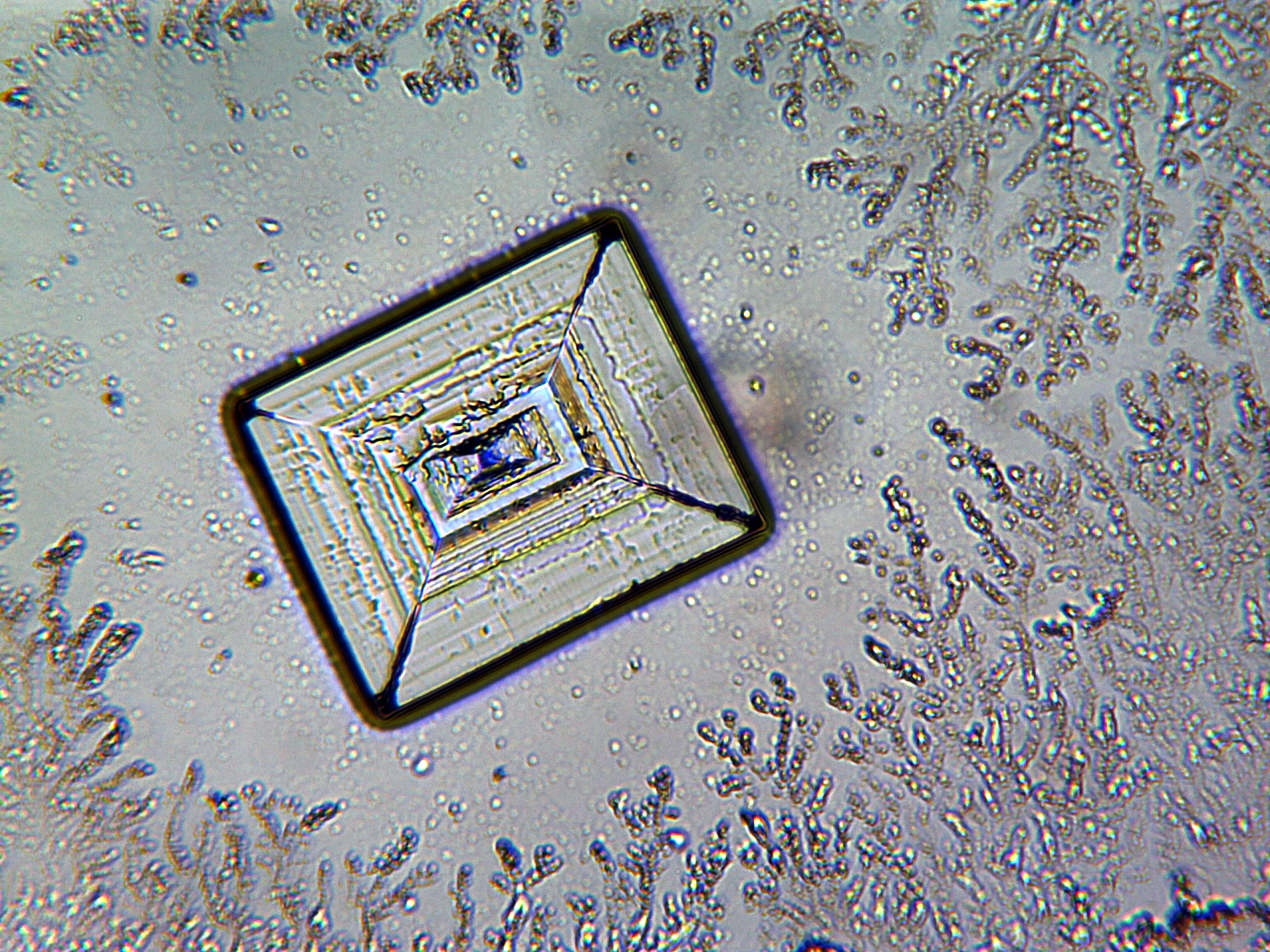
Sodium chloride crystal under microscope.

NaCl octahedra. The yellow stipples represent the electrostatic force between the ions of opposite charge

=== Solid sodium chloride ===
In solid sodium chloride, each ion is surrounded by six ions of the opposite charge as expected on electrostatic grounds. The surrounding ions are located at the vertices of a regular octahedron. In the language of close-packing, the larger chloride ions (167 pm in size) are arranged in a cubic array whereas the smaller sodium ions (116 pm) fill all the cubic gaps (octahedral voids) between them. This same basic structure is found in many other compounds and is commonly known as the NaCl structure or rock salt crystal structure. It can be represented as a face-centered cubic (fcc) lattice with a two-atom basis or as two interpenetrating face centered cubic lattices. The first atom is located at each lattice point, and the second atom is located halfway between lattice points along the fcc unit cell edge.

Solid sodium chloride has a melting point of 801 °C and liquid sodium chloride boils at 1465 °C. Atomic-resolution real-time video imaging allows visualization of the initial stage of crystal nucleation of sodium chloride.

The thermal conductivity of sodium chloride as a function of temperature has a maximum of 2.03 W/(cm K) at 8 K (−265.15 °C; −445.27 °F) and decreases to 0.069 at 314 K (41 °C; 106 °F). It also decreases with doping.

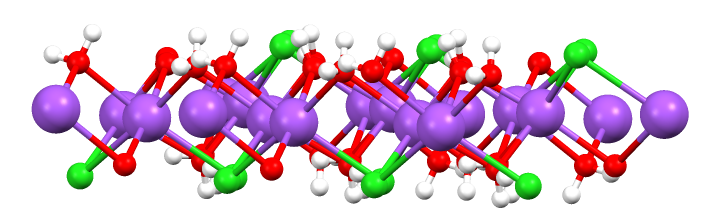
View of one slab of hydrohalite, NaCl·2H_{2}O. (red = O, white = H, green = Cl, purple = Na).

From cold (sub-freezing) solutions, salt crystallises with water of hydration as hydrohalite (the dihydrate NaCl·2H_{2}O).

In 2023, it was discovered that under pressure, sodium chloride can form the hydrates NaCl·8.5H_{2}O and NaCl·13H_{2}O.

=== Aqueous solutions ===
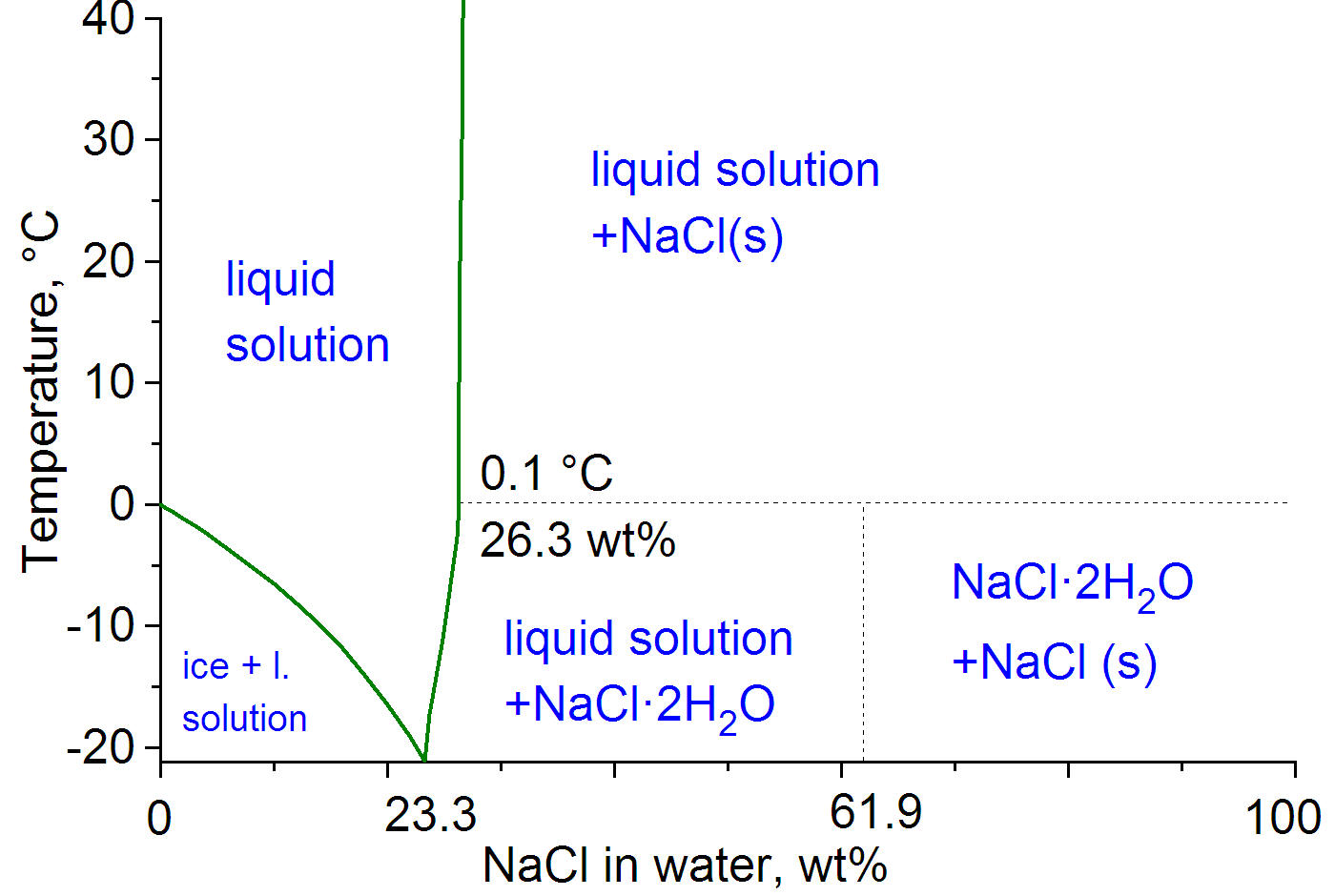
Phase diagram of water–NaCl mixture

The attraction between the Na^{+} and Cl^{−} ions in the solid is so strong that only highly polar solvents like water dissolve NaCl well.

When dissolved in water, the sodium chloride framework disintegrates as the Na^{+} and Cl^{−} ions become surrounded by polar water molecules. These solutions consist of metal aquo complex with the formula [Na(H_{2}O)_{8}]^{+}, with the Na–O distance of 250 pm. The chloride ions are also strongly solvated, each being surrounded by an average of six molecules of water. Solutions of sodium chloride have very different properties from pure water. The eutectic point is −21.12 °C (−6.02 °F) for 23.31% mass fraction of salt, and the boiling point of saturated salt solution is near 108.7 °C (227.7 °F).

Some important NaCl solutions in water		
solution	w%	M
sauerkraut	2.5	0.428
seawater	3.5	0.48
pickles	5	0.85
eutectic	23.3	3.95
saturated at 20 °C	26.4	6

=== pH of sodium chloride solutions ===
The pH of a sodium chloride solution remains ≈7 due to the extremely weak basicity of the Cl^{−} ion, which is the conjugate base of the strong acid HCl. In other words, NaCl has no effect on system pH in diluted solutions where the effects of ionic strength and activity coefficients are negligible.

Solubility of NaCl (g NaCl / 1 kg of solvent at 25 °C (77 °F))
Water	360
Formamide	94
Glycerin	83
Propylene glycol	71
Formic acid	52
Liquid ammonia	30.2
Methanol	14
Ethanol	0.65
Dimethylformamide	0.4
Propan-1-ol	0.124
Sulfolane	0.05
Butan-1-ol	0.05
Propan-2-ol	0.03
Pentan-1-ol	0.018
Acetonitrile	0.003
Acetone	0.00042

=== Stoichiometric and structure variants ===
Common salt has a 1:1 molar ratio of sodium and chlorine. In 2013, compounds of sodium and chloride of different stoichiometries have been discovered; five new compounds were predicted (e.g., Na_{3}Cl, Na_{2}Cl, Na_{3}Cl_{2}, NaCl_{3}, and NaCl_{7}). The existence of some of them has been experimentally confirmed at high pressures and other conditions: cubic and orthorhombic NaCl_{3}, two-dimensional metallic tetragonal Na_{3}Cl and exotic hexagonal NaCl. This indicates that compounds violating chemical intuition are possible, in simple systems under non-ambient conditions.

== Occurrence ==
Salt is found in the Earth's crust as the mineral halite (rock salt), and a tiny amount exists as suspended sea salt particles in the atmosphere. These particles are the dominant cloud condensation nuclei far out at sea, which allow the formation of clouds in otherwise non-polluted air.

== Production ==
Salt is currently mass-produced by evaporation of seawater or brine from brine wells and salt lakes. Mining of rock salt is also a major source. China is the world's main supplier of salt. In 2017, world production was estimated at 280 million tonnes, the top five producers (in million tonnes) being China (68.0), United States (43.0), India (26.0), Germany (13.0), and Canada (13.0). Salt is also a byproduct of potassium mining.

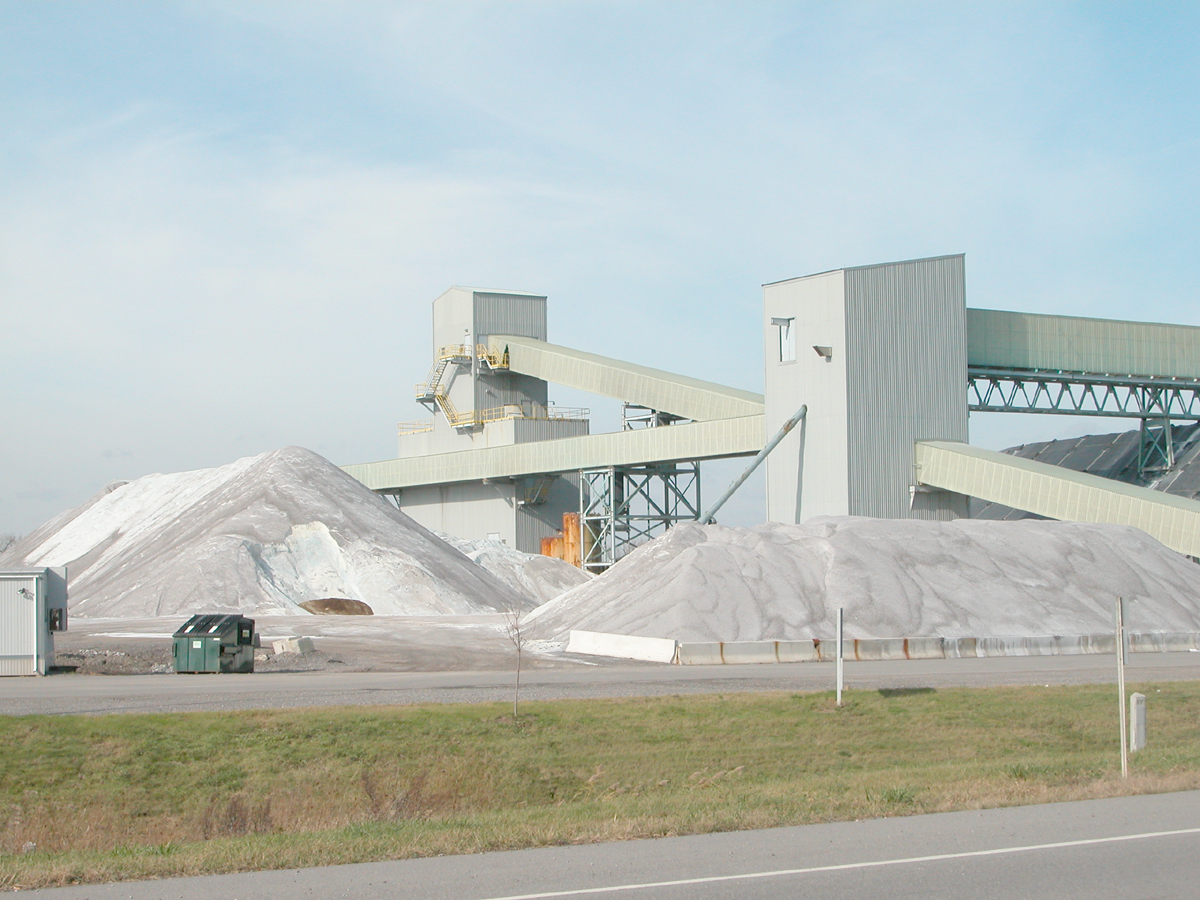
Modern rock salt mine near Mount Morris, New York, United States

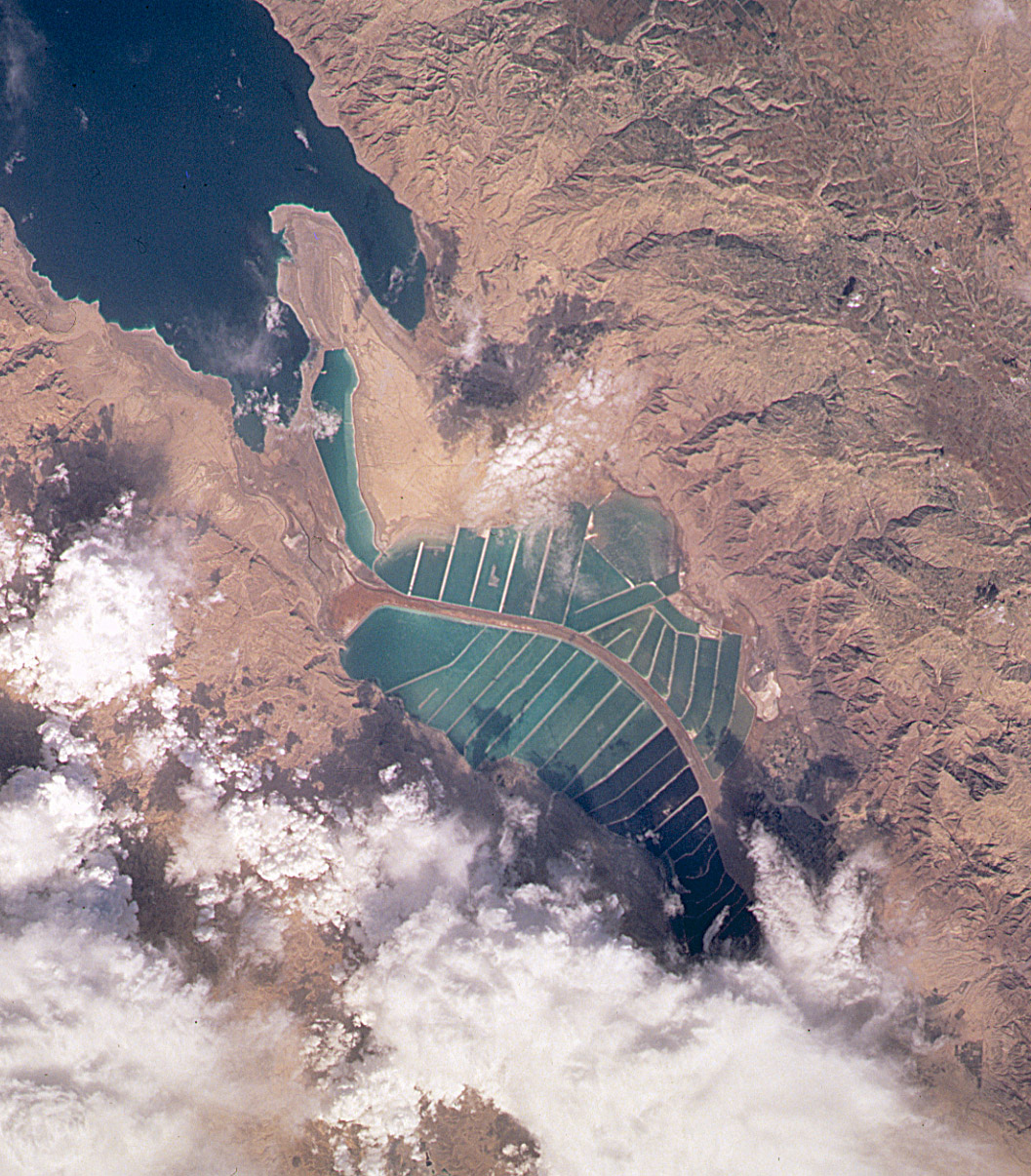
Jordanian and Israeli salt evaporation ponds at the south end of the Dead Sea.

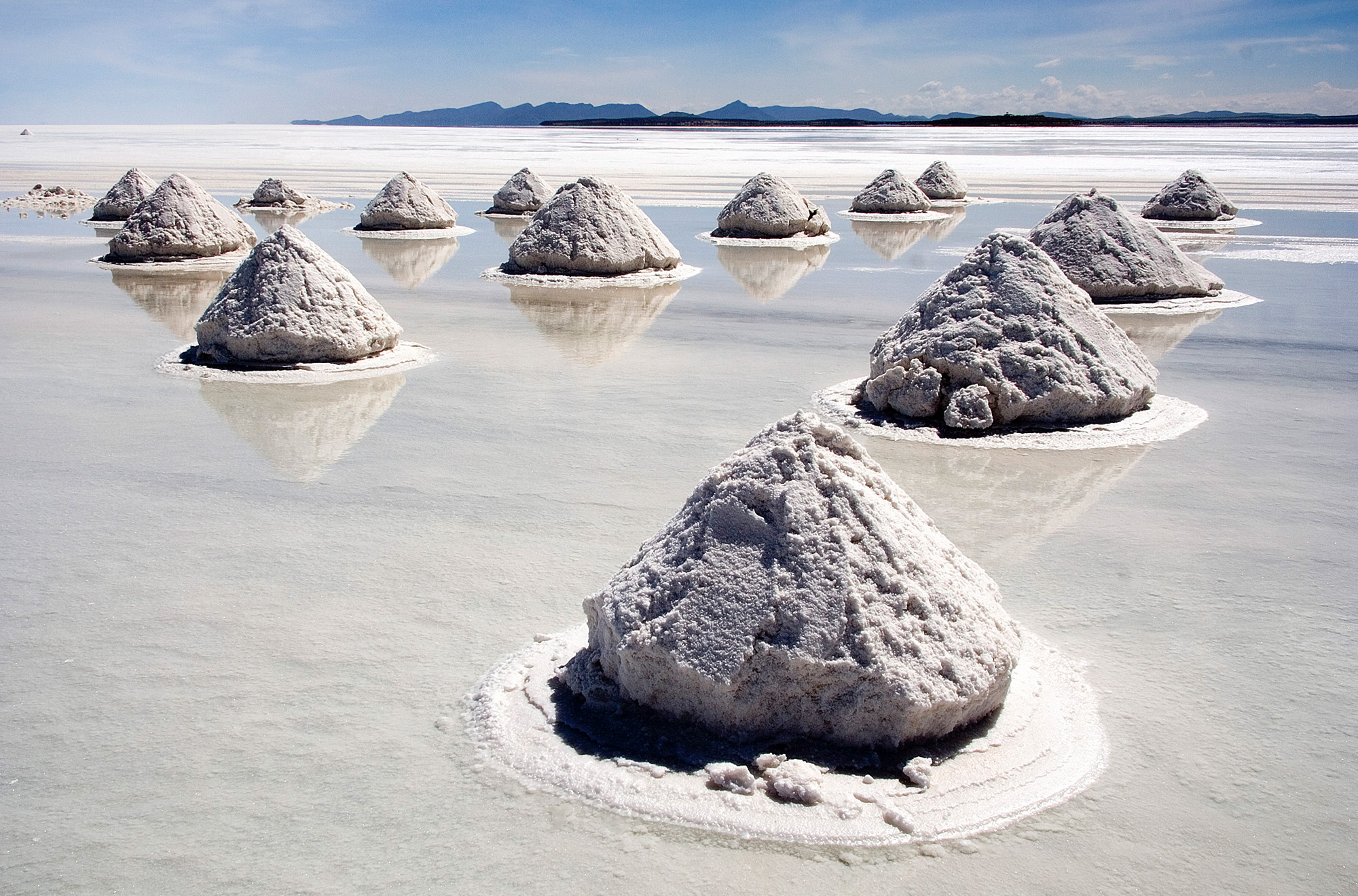
Mounds of salt, Salar de Uyuni, Bolivia.

== See also ==
- Biosalinity
- Edible salt (table salt)
- Halite, the mineral form of sodium chloride
- Health effects of salt
- Salinity
- Salting the earth
- Salt poisoning

== Cited sources ==
- Haynes, William M., ed. (2011). CRC Handbook of Chemistry and Physics (92nd ed.). CRC Press. ISBN 978-1439855119.
