= Fisher Engineering =

American snow removal equipment manufacturer

- Type: Subsidiary
- Industry: Snow management equipment manufacturer
- Founded: 1948
- Founder: Dean Fisher
- Headquarters: Rockland, Maine, United States
- Products: Snowplows; Spreaders
- Parent: Douglas Dynamics
- Website: www.fisherplows.com

Douglas Dynamics
- Traded as: NYSE: PLOW; Russell 2000 Index component

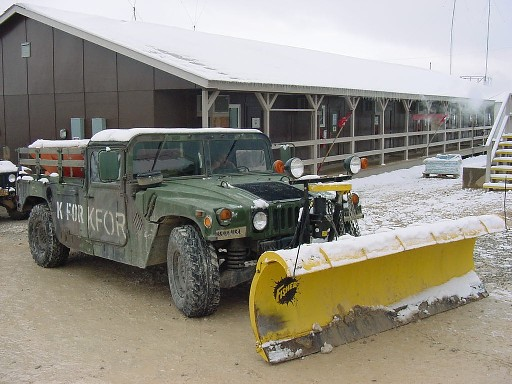
A FISHER plow with a steel SnoFoil deflector attached to keep snow from blowing up on the windshield.

Fisher Engineering is an American manufacturer of snowplows and other professional snow removal equipment, located in Rockland, Maine. Fisher Engineering is a subsidiary of Douglas Dynamics (NYSE:PLOW), which also owns Western Products, Blizzard, and TrynEx International, each producing their own snowplow brands.

Fisher Engineering is one of the leading snow management equipment providers in the Northeastern United States. Fisher Engineering designs and manufactures snowplows for commercial snow plowing, as well as institutional, residential, and municipal applications.

== History ==
Dean L. Fisher, a civil engineer from Kansas and a United States Navy U.S. Navy SeaBee, founded Fisher Engineering in 1948. After noticing a potential market for small snowplows mounted on Willys Jeeps, Fisher decided to go into business for himself and started a manufacturing facility in Rockland, Maine. With a handful of welders and general workers, Fisher began designing and building snowplows, producing approximately 50 in the first year.

Initially, Fisher Engineering built snowplows exclusively for Willys Jeep vehicles, the only light-duty four-wheel-drive vehicle at the time. As new models of lightweight four-wheel-drive vehicles came to market, Fisher responded by introducing corresponding snowplow models. At the same time, he began introducing new innovations. By 1957, the trip-edge cutting surface and under-the-hood, belt-driven hydraulic systems were available in the FISHER snowplow line.

In 1984, Dean Fisher sold Fisher Engineering to Douglas Dynamics of Milwaukee, Wisconsin. The purchase gave Douglas Dynamics ownership of the two largest snowplow manufacturers in America at the time—Western Products and Fisher Engineering.

== Innovations ==
In 1957, Fisher Engineering developed a “trip-edge” system, which allows the lower cutting edge surface of the blade to rotate backward when the edge hits an immovable object.

In 1962, Fisher Engineering introduced the “Quick-Switch” hydraulic angling system. The system enabled the snowplow operator to change the angle of the blade left and right, hydraulically, from a control lever mounted inside the vehicle's cab. Until then, the snowplow operator had to manually change the angle of the blade from outside the vehicle.

In 1975–76, Fisher Engineering created an electrically driven hydraulic system capable of operating off the electrical systems of modern trucks.

In 2005, Douglas Dynamics purchased the Blizzard Corporation, which is known for its adjustable-wing snowplows. Shortly thereafter, Fisher Engineering introduced the XLS adjustable-width snowplow that incorporates the technology acquired from Blizzard Corp.

== Products ==
=== Snowplows ===
- Homesteader – Straight-blade snowplow for residential use
- HT Series – Full-size straight-blade snowplow for half-ton pickups
- SD Series – Straight-blade snowplow for lightweight four-wheel-drive vehicles
- HD Series – Commercial-grade straight-blade snowplow for heavy-duty pickups and four-wheel-drive vehicles
- XBLADE – Straight-blade commercial snowplow with crossbar reinforcements and a stainless steel moldboard
- XtremeV – Commercial-grade, hydraulic V-plow
- XLS – Adjustable-width snowplow with wings that are extendable and can be put into scoop and windrowing positions
- MC Series – Large municipal and contractor-grade snowplow
- HD2 - Replaced the HD with more accessories, made with more reinforced vertical ribs
- HDX - Replaced the XBLADE snowplow with an articulating A-frame and adjustable attack angle

=== Spreaders ===
- POLY-CASTER – Large salt and sand spreader for commercial or municipal ice control, mountable in large pickup trucks
- PRO-CASTER – Salt and sand spreader mountable in pickup, dump or platform trucks, for commercial and municipal ice control
- SPEED-CASTER 2 – Tailgate-mounted salt and sand spreader for commercial and residential ice control
- Low Profile – Low-profile tailgate-mounted salt and sand spreader for commercial and residential ice control
