= Sodium chloride (data page) =

NaCl, or table salt

== Introduction ==
Sodium chloride, commonly known as salt or table salt, is an ionic compound with the chemical formula NaCl, representing a 1:1 ratio of sodium and chloride ions. It is a white, crystalline solid that is transparent or translucent in large single crystals, brittle, hygroscopic, and occurs naturally as the mineral halite. In the solid state it adopts a face-centered cubic lattice in which each Na^{+} ion is octahedrally coordinated by six Cl^{−} ions and vice versa, a motif known as the rock salt structure (space group Fm3̅m, lattice constant a = 564.02 pm). Sodium chloride is highly soluble in water, and its aqueous solution is commonly referred to as saline. It is the principal component of edible salt and is used widely as a seasoning, a food preservative, and a feedstock in the industrial production of chlorine and sodium hydroxide.

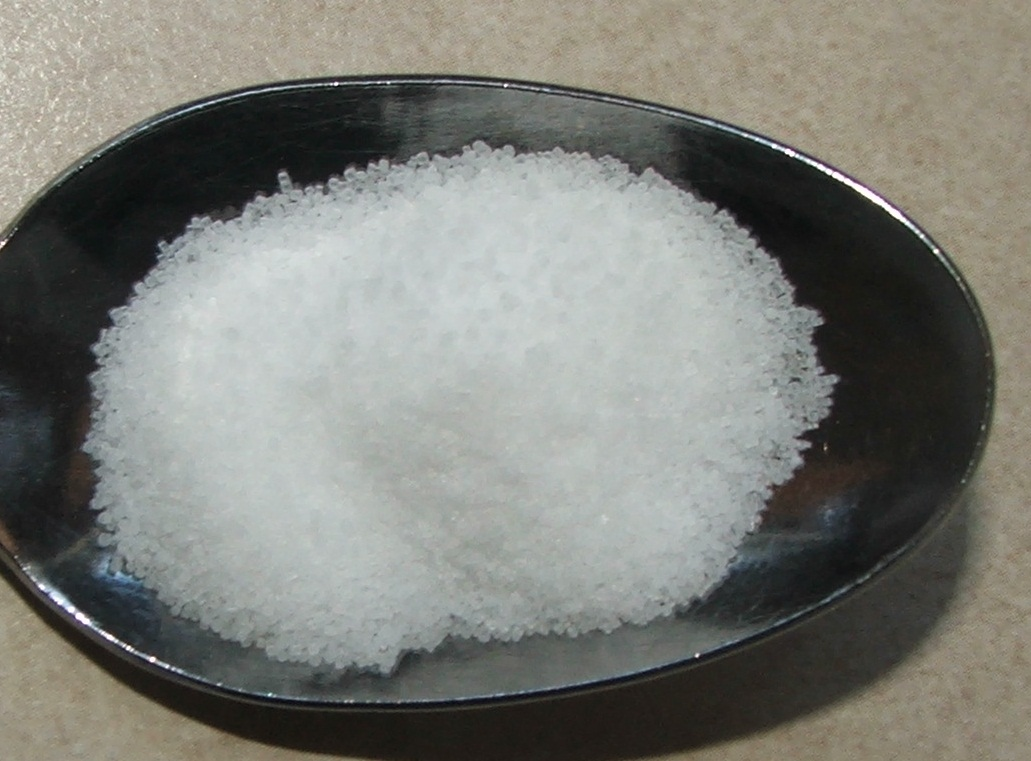

== Material safety data sheet ==
Handling this chemical may necessitate specific safety precautions. It is recommended to review and follow the directions of a reputable material safety data sheet for this chemical.

== Structure and properties ==
Structure and properties
Index of refraction, n_{D}	1.5442
Abbe number	?
Dielectric constant,	6.12 at 17–22 °C
Bond strength	?
Bond length	?
Bond angle	?
Magnetic susceptibility	−30.3×10^{−6} cgs

== Thermodynamic properties ==
Phase behavior
Triple point	1074 K (801 °C), 30 Pa
Critical point	3900 K (3600 °C), 26×10^{6} Pa
Std enthalpy change of fusion, Δ_{fus}H^{~~o~~}	30.39 kJ/mol (0.52 kJ/g)
Std entropy change of fusion, Δ_{fus}S^{~~o~~}	26.02 J/(mol·K)
Std enthalpy change of vaporization, Δ_{vap}H^{~~o~~}	130.05 @ T-Boiling kJ/mol
Std entropy change of vaporization, Δ_{vap}S^{~~o~~}	? J/(mol·K)
Solid properties
Std enthalpy change of formation, Δ_{f}H^{~~o~~}_{solid}	−411.12 kJ/mol
Standard molar entropy, S^{~~o~~}_{solid}	72 J/(mol·K)
Heat capacity, c_{p}	50 J/(mol·K) ; 0.853 J/(g·K)
Liquid properties
Std enthalpy change of formation, Δ_{f}H^{~~o~~}_{liquid}	−385.92 kJ/mol
Standard molar entropy, S^{~~o~~}_{liquid}	95.06 J/(mol·K)
Density	1.549 g/cm^{3}, at 850 °C
Heat capacity, c_{p}	? J/(mol·K)
Boiling point	1465 °C
Gas properties
Std enthalpy change of formation, Δ_{f}H^{~~o~~}_{gas}	−181.42 kJ/mol
Standard molar entropy, S^{~~o~~}_{gas}	229.79 J/(mol·K)
Heat capacity, c_{p}	? J/(mol·K)

== Density data of aqueous solutions ==
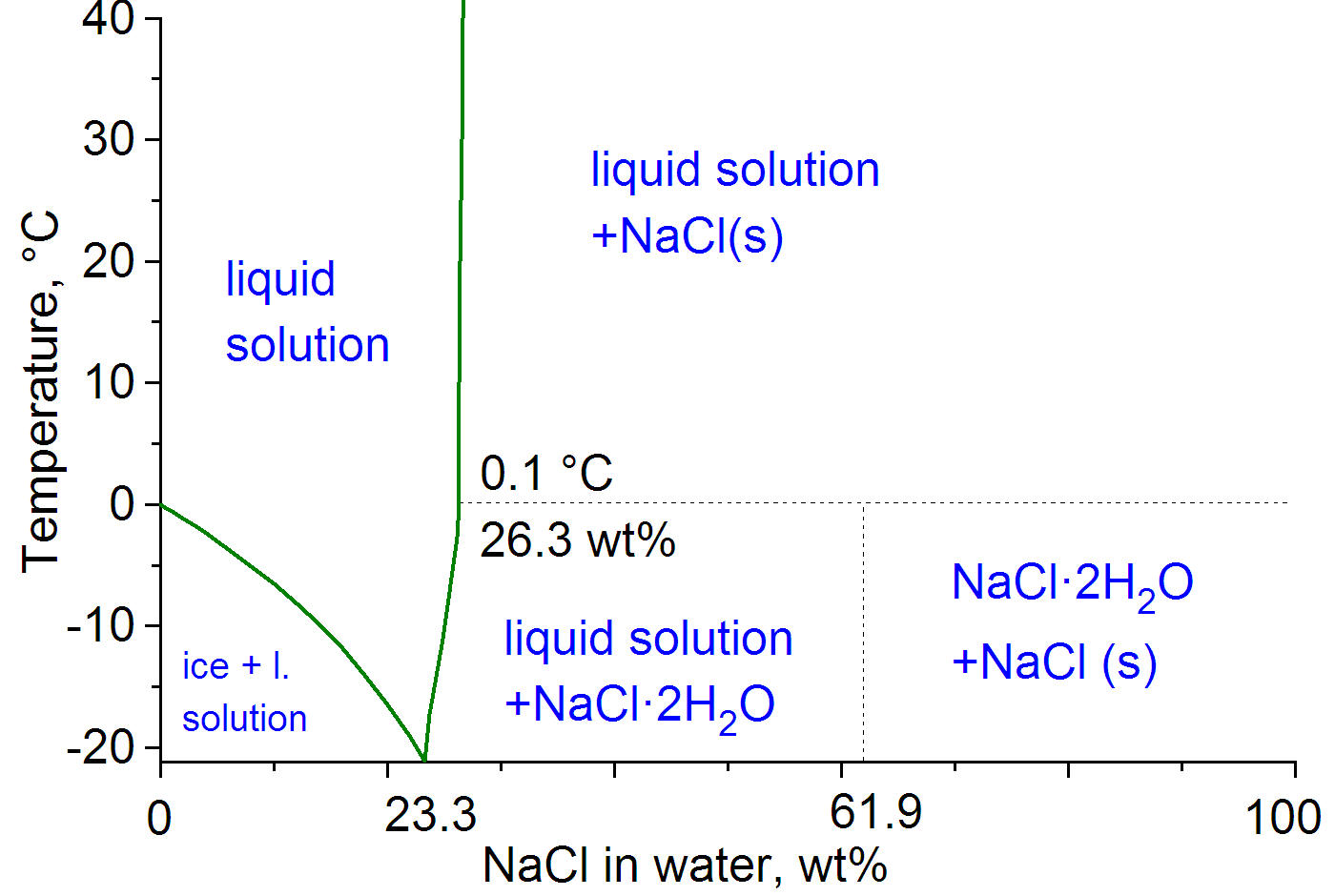
Water–NaCl phase diagram

Properties of water–NaCl mixtures
NaCl, wt%	T_{eq}, °C	ρ, g/cm^{3}	n	η, mPa·s
0	0	0.99984	1.333	1.002
0.5	−0.3	1.0018	1.3339	1.011
1	−0.59	1.0053	1.3347	1.02
2	−1.19	1.0125	1.3365	1.036
3	−1.79	1.0196	1.3383	1.052
4	−2.41	1.0268	1.34	1.068
5	−3.05	1.034	1.3418	1.085
6	−3.7	1.0413	1.3435	1.104
7	−4.38	1.0486	1.3453	1.124
8	−5.08	1.0559	1.347	1.145
9	−5.81	1.0633	1.3488	1.168
10	−6.56	1.0707	1.3505	1.193
12	−8.18	1.0857	1.3541	1.25
14	−9.94	1.1008	1.3576	1.317
16	−11.89	1.1162	1.3612	1.388
18	−14.04	1.1319	1.3648	1.463
20	−16.46	1.1478	1.3684	1.557
22	−19.18	1.164	1.3721	1.676
23.3	−21.1			
23.7	−17.3			
24.9	−11.1			
26.1	−2.7			
26.28	0			
26.32	10			
26.41	20			
26.45	25			
26.52	30			
26.67	40			
26.84	50			
27.03	60			
27.25	70			
27.5	80			
27.78	90			
28.05	100			

Note: ρ is density, n is refractive index at 589 nm, and η is viscosity, all at 20 °C; T_{eq} is the equilibrium temperature between two phases: ice/liquid solution for T_{eq} < 0–0.1 °C and NaCl/liquid solution for T_{eq} above 0.1 °C.

== Spectral data ==
UV-Vis
λ_{max}	? nm
Extinction coefficient, ε	?
IR
Major absorption bands	? cm^{−1}
NMR
Proton NMR
Carbon-13 NMR
Other NMR data
MS
Masses of main fragments

This box:
- Except where noted otherwise, data relate to Standard temperature and pressure.
- Reliability of data general note.
