= Western Products =

American brand name for snow plows

- Company type: Division
- Traded as: NYSE: PLOW
- Industry: Manufacturing
- Founded: 1952
- Founder: Douglas Seaman
- Headquarters: Milwaukee, Wisconsin, United States
- Key people: Mark Van Genderen (President & Chief Executive Officer) | Sarah Lauber (Executive Vice President & Chief Financial Officer) | Chris Bernauer (President, Work Truck Attachments)
- Products: Snowplows; Spreaders
- Parent: Douglas Dynamics
- Website: www.westernplows.com

Western Products is an American brand name for snow plows and other professional snow removing equipment manufactured by Western Welding and Manufacturing. The company also manufactures a variety of truck-mounted sand and salt spreaders, snowplow replacement parts and snow removal accessories.

Western Products employs approximately 250 people, headquartered at the manufacturing facility in Milwaukee, Wisconsin. The company is a division of Douglas Dynamics which also owns Blizzard, SnowEx, Fisher Engineering, Dejana, Henderson, and Venco Venturo.

== History ==
On September 5, 1950, Douglas Seaman purchased Western Welding & Manufacturing, a small machine shop in Milwaukee that was founded in 1943. Western mainly handled small, one-off welding jobs for large manufacturers. A friend suggested to Seaman that he should start manufacturing snowplows as a way to diversify his business, which he did. In 1952, Western Welding introduced its first snowplow at a time when the U.S. population was shifting toward suburb settings, which increased the market for light trucks. This increased the demand for snowplows.

== Growth ==
Suburban areas continued to thrive through the 1950s, and the light-truck market continued to grow. The demand for snowplows continued rising, allowing Western Products' sales to double between 1961 and 1968. In 1966, Western Products acquired its current headquarters on Milwaukee’s Northwest Side.

The 1970s also proved to be a profitable time for the company, as its share of the national market for the type of snowplows mounted on light trucks rose from 33 percent in 1968 to 40 percent a decade later. By 1976, they started focusing solely on snowplow manufacturing and sold the construction equipment side of the business.

In 1977 Douglas Seaman incorporated Douglas Dynamics as the parent company of Western Products. In 1984, Douglas Dynamics expanded, purchasing Fisher Engineering, a well respected competitor in the snow plow business.

== Expansion ==
In November 2005 Douglas Dynamics purchased Blizzard Corporation, including their complete line of snowplows and snowplow patents. Among the patents was a patent for an "adjustable-wing snowplow" that allowed the blade to extend from 8 feet out to 10 feet. Douglas Dynamics incorporated that technology into both its existing snowplow brands.

In 2019, Western Products purchased a former car dealership and converted it for additional office and manufacturing space.
