= Snow removal in Montreal =

Process of removing snowfall in Montreal, Canada

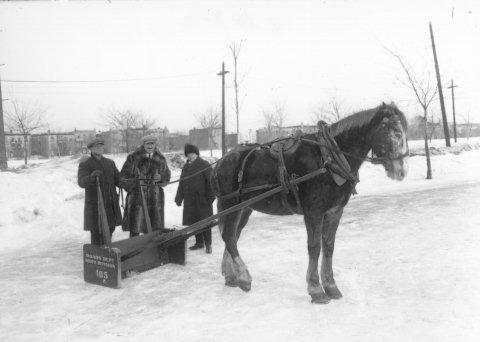
A horse-drawn snowplow which appears to be clearing a hockey rink in Montreal.

Each winter, the Canadian city of Montreal clears snow off of roads, sidewalks, and other public throughfares to make it easier and safer to travel. Montreal is the snowiest major city in North America and its snow removal operation is among the largest in the world, costing C$179.7 million in 2020. Montreal sees about 210 cm (82.5 in) of snowfall annually, with at least a centimetre of snow on the ground for nearly four months out of the year.

In a given year, the city removes 300,000 truckloads of snow, representing 10,000 kilometres of city streets. Some three thousand workers are employed as part of the effort.

== History ==
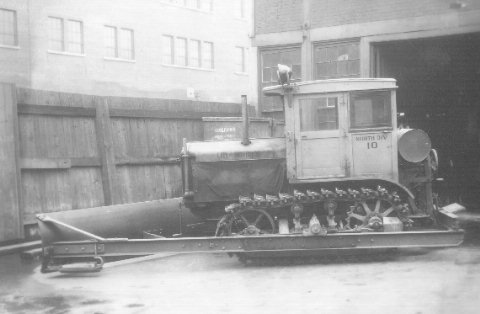
An early example of a tractor-driven snow-plow in Montreal, likely from the 1920s. Similar vehicles were in use to clear highways around the city until 1935.

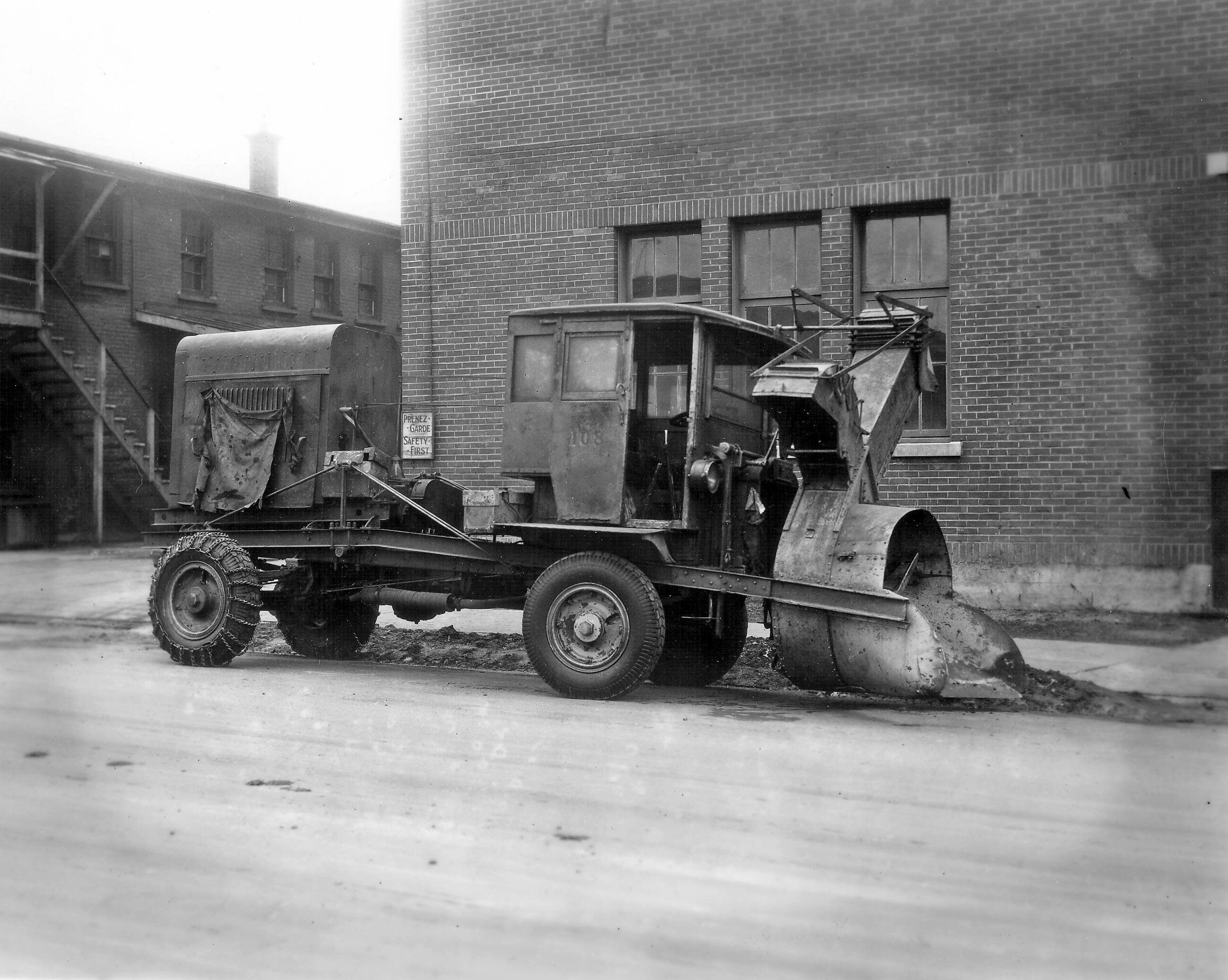
A Sicard snowblower, invented for use clearing snow in Montreal.

Snow in Montreal was originally cleared by hand, using shovels and pickaxes. By the mid-19th century, horse-drawn plows were used to assist snow-clearing efforts. With the introduction of the automobile in the early 20th century, public streets were cleared with automobile-attached plows, and by the 1920s, track-driven vehicles were used for plowing.

Between 1880 and 1927, the population of Montreal tripled, increasing demand for better snow-removal techniques. Arthur Sicard, a Montreal-based inventor, introduced the snowblower in 1925 to contribute to the effort. Named the "Sicard Snow Remover Snowblower", the machine sold for C$13,000 (equivalent to $234,571 in 2025); the city purchased several to assist in clearing snow, primarily in Outremont.

Over the following decades, additional snow-clearing machines were introduced to Montreal, including several which originated in France. The city's budget for snow removal increased over this period, from C$4 million in 1953 (equivalent to $46.91 million in 2025) to C$8.95 million (equivalent to $91.28 million in 2025) a decade later.

By 1963, the city was hauling off 1,200,000 truckloads of snow annually. By then, several measures were in effect which remain in use today, including vehicle towing: A two-tone horn was used to alert motorists that snow removal was imminent, and C$5 tickets (equivalent to $90 in 2025) were issued to cars which failed to move and were eventually towed. More than 30,000 cars were being towed annually by the 1970s to accommodate snow-removal efforts. The city was also divided into 83 districts, each with a different captain helming removal efforts, with decrees from Montreal city council mandating passable roads within 8 hours and fully-cleared roads within 72 hours. By 1978, the budget for snow removal in Montreal had reached C$31 million (equivalent to $139.08 million in 2025).

Several ideas beyond snow removal were also proposed (but never implemented) in the 1960s with the aim of reducing costs, including heated roads, cloud insemination to prevent precipitation from incoming storms over the city, and mobile or stationary snow melters. Until the 1980s, most snow was dumped at wharfs into the St. Lawrence River, causing salt and gravel pollution. Landscape dumps and sewer chutes were later implemented as a solution for snow displacement.

In recent years, modern technologies including walkie-talkies, drones, GPS, and cameras have been added to streamline the snow-clearing process. Citizens can report and view the status of snow-clearing efforts using several mobile applications introduced by the city.

== Infrastructure and design ==
A motor grader and a wheel loader clear snow during a snowfall in the Mile End neighbourhood.

Dump trucks and snow blowers are used for snow removal after a snowfall Plateau-Mont-Royal neighbourhood.

The snow removal process is completed in stages. First, streets and sidewalks are plowed, requiring a fleet of 1,000 vehicles to complete the task. Second, Montreal then employs an extensive loading stage where trucks pick up and transport snow that has been plowed to the side of the road. This involves snow machines that shoot the snow into dump trucks that haul the snow away to one of the city's snow dump sites. Most other North American cities only employ loading in their snow removal operations sporadically, if at all.

Very narrow streets are cleared first (to allow the passage of emergency vehicles), followed by main roads, collector roads, and finally residential streets. Bike paths are often finished first due to the unique machines required to clear them and the reduced area they represent, with 75 per cent of the bike-lane system remaining cleared in winter months. Roads and sidewalks are salted continuously, consuming 140,000 tons of salt per year.

Snow removal across the city is organized in a decentralized manner, with each of the 19 boroughs managing its own removal process. After criticism for disparities in effectiveness between boroughs, the city implemented centralized mandates in 2016, requiring snow removal in each borough to commence within 12 hours of a snowfall and for major roads to be cleared within 36 hours.

=== Removal and displacement ===
Once collected, snow is cleared to either sewer chutes or directly to landscape dumps. Fifteen sewer chutes and eleven snow depots are spread across the city to accommodate snow displacement.

Sewer chutes process 25 per cent of the city's snow, in which the snow mixes with hot wastewater from residential showers, melts, and flows to a treatment plant in Montreal East, where it is filtered and eventually released into the St. Lawrence River.

Dump sites are used to store the remaining snow. Of these, the largest is the Francon snow depot, formerly a quarry, which receives 40 per cent of the city's snow. Snow slowly melts from the quarry in the summertime and is processed by the wastewater system, although a man-made glacier will often remain throughout the warmer months.

=== Budget ===
The annual cost for snow removal exceeds C$170 million, representing 3% of the city's entire budget in 2021.

In 2012, Maisonneuve reported that the city of Montreal spends about 37 per cent more on snowplowing than other municipalities in Quebec, leading them to raise questions about collusion and bid-rigging. Equipment destruction, specifically "firebombing", the use of Molotov cocktail-like devices on snow removal equipment, is employed by private snow removal firms to dissuade competition.

Upon arrival at dumps, the quantity of snow carried by trucks is verified by camera and GPS to ensure contractors fulfill their obligations. Several snow removal companies have been blacklisted by the city for overcharging for their services.

=== Comparison with other systems ===
Other cities, including Chicago and Boston, have had their snow removal mechanisms criticized as inferior to that of Montreal.

== See also ==
- Snow removal
- Snow blower
- Geography of Montreal
