= Snow removal =

Job of removing snow

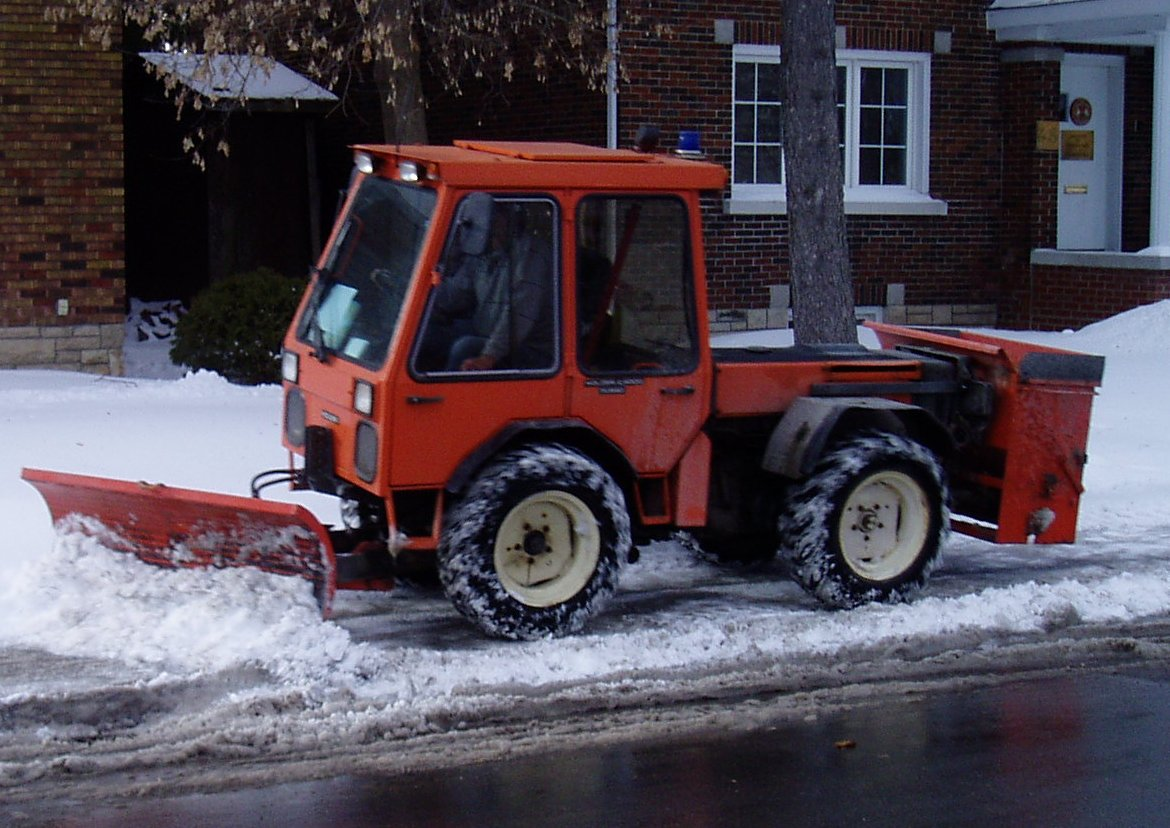
A sidewalk clearing plow in Ottawa, Ontario, Canada

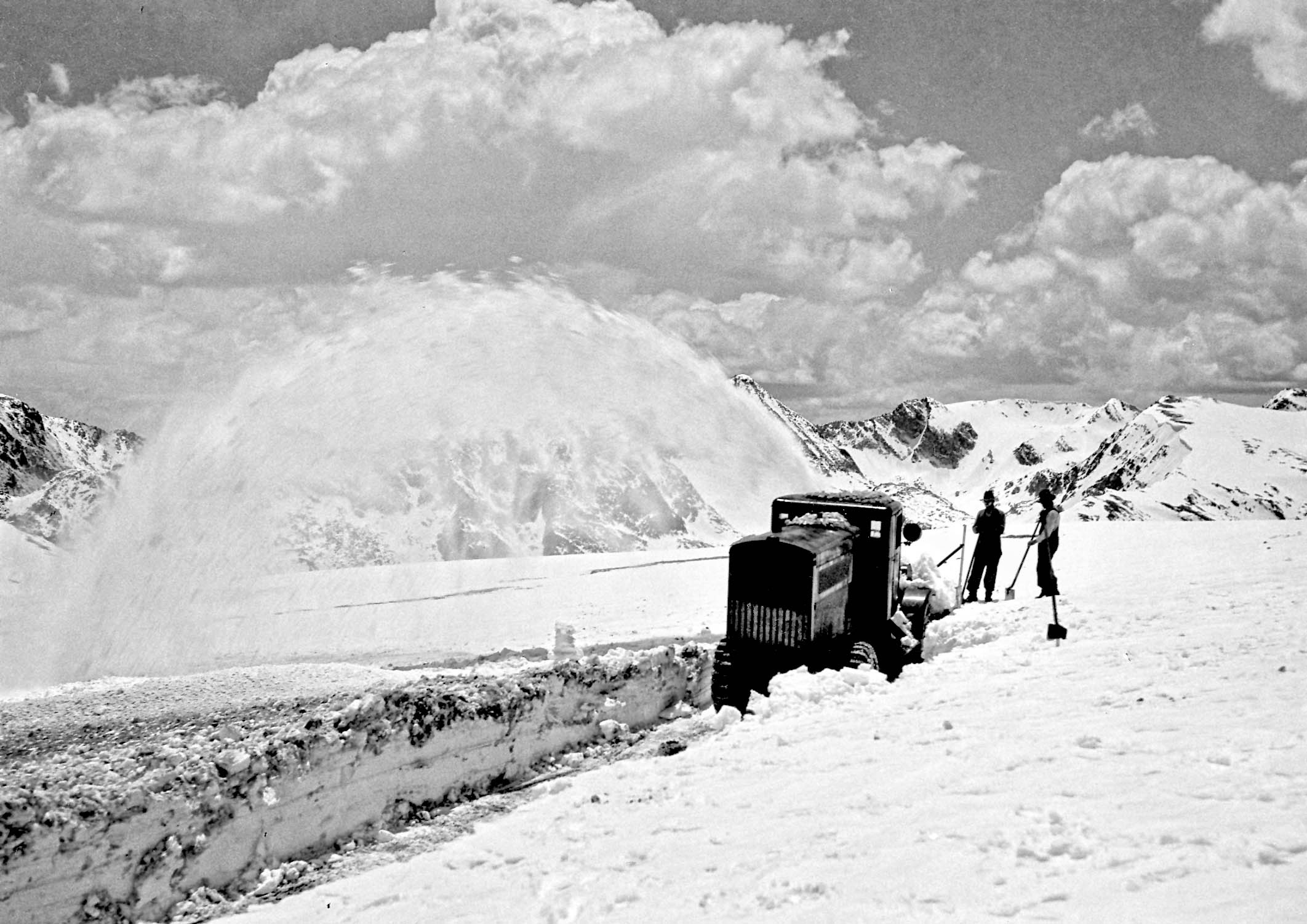
Snowblower in Rocky Mountain National Park, 1933

Snow removal or snow clearing is the job of removing snow after a snowfall to make travel easier and safer. This is done both by individual households and by governments institutions, and commercial businesses.

== De-icing and anti-icing ==
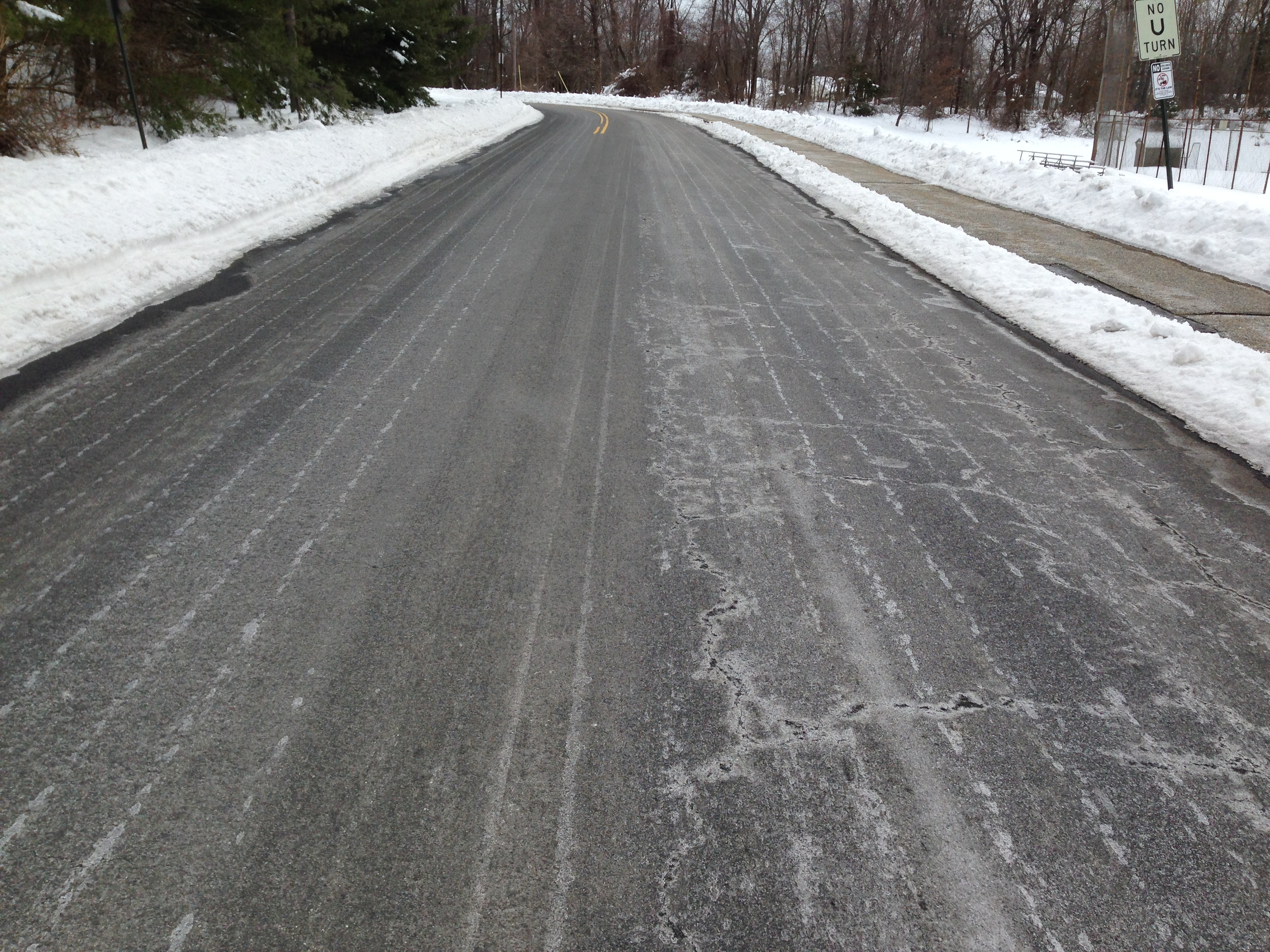
Salt brine sprayed and dried on a road surface for anti-icing before a snow storm

De-icing is defined as removal of existing snow, ice or frost from a roadway, airport runway, roof, or other surface. It includes both mechanical means, such as plowing, vacuuming or scraping, and chemical means, such as application of salt or other ice-melting chemicals. Anti-icing is treatment with ice-melting chemicals before or during the onset of a storm in order to prevent or delay the formation and adhesion of ice and snow to the surface. Brine, or wetted salt, is usually applied shortly before the beginning of a snowstorm. When properly performed, anti-icing can significantly reduce the amount of salt required and allow easier removal by mechanical methods, including plowing.

The de-icing of roads has historically been accomplished by snowplows or specially designed dump trucks that spread salt, often mixed with sand and gravel, onto slick roads. Rock salt is normally used because it is inexpensive and readily available in large quantities. However, brine freezes at −18 °C (0 °F), and so it is ineffective at these low temperatures. It also has a strong tendency to cause corrosion, rusting the steel used in most vehicles and the rebar in concrete bridges. More recent snowmelters use other salts, such as calcium chloride and magnesium chloride, which not only decrease the freezing point of water to a much lower temperature but also produce an exothermic reaction, whose dissipated heat further aids in melting. In addition, they are somewhat safer for concrete sidewalks, but excess should still be removed.

Recently, organic compounds have been developed that reduce the environmental impact associated with salts and that have longer residual effects when spread on roadways, usually in conjunction with salt brines or solids. These compounds are generated as byproducts of agricultural operations, such as sugar beet refining or ethanol distillation. A mixture of some selection of these organic compounds with a combination of salts results in a substance that is both more easily spread and more effective at lower temperatures (−34 °C or −30 °F).

Since the 1990s, use of liquid chemical melters has been increasing, sprayed on roads by nozzles instead of a spinning spreader used with salts. Liquid melters are more effective at preventing the ice from bonding to the surface than melting through existing ice.

Several proprietary products incorporate anti-icing chemicals into the pavement. Verglimit incorporates calcium chloride granules into asphalt pavement. The granules are continually exposed by traffic wear, and release calcium chloride onto the surface. This prevents snow and ice from sticking to the pavement Cargill SafeLane is a proprietary pavement surface treatment that absorbs anti-icing brines, to be released during a storm or other icing event. It also provides a high-friction surface, increasing traction.

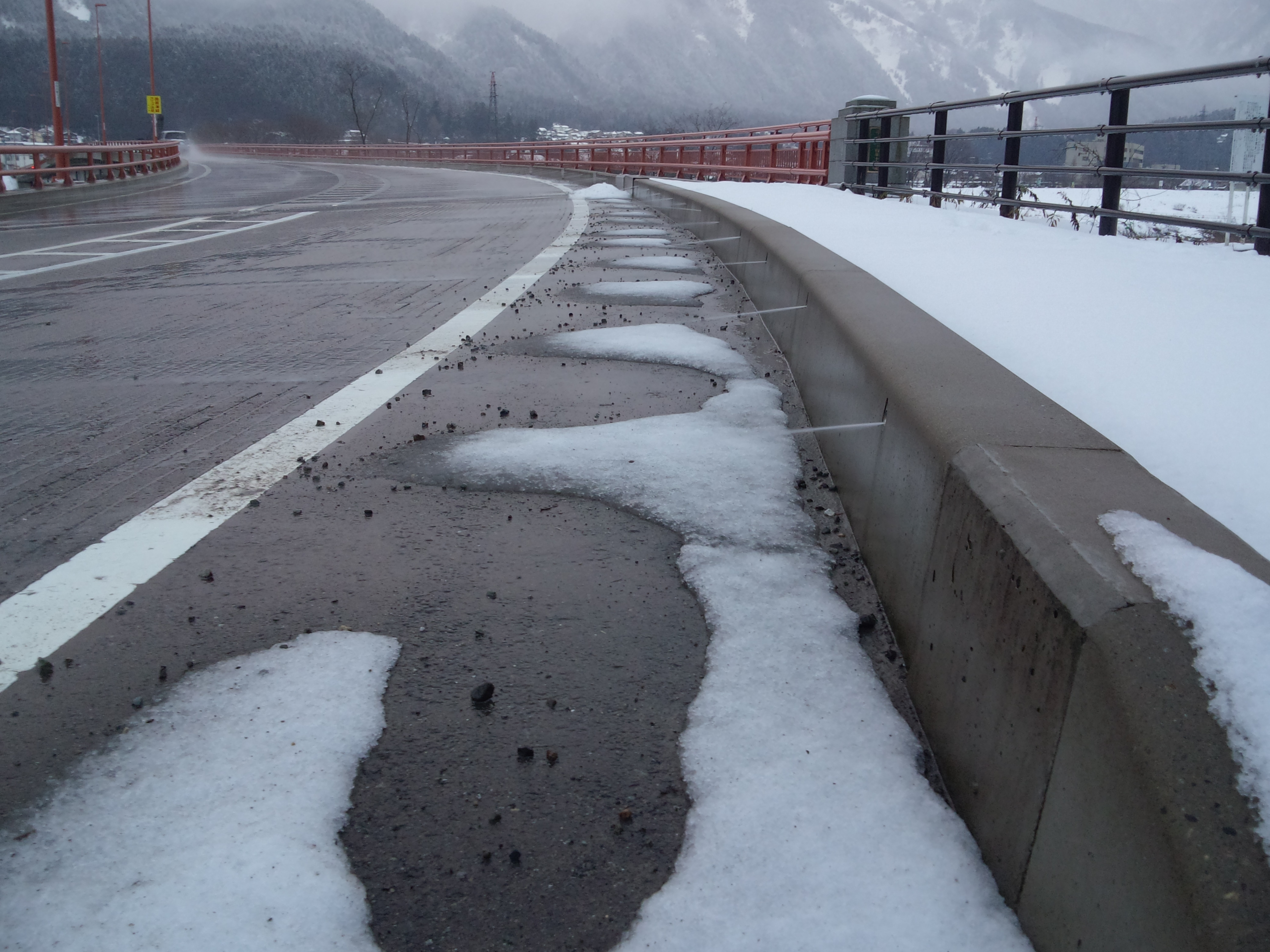
A Japanese road sprinkler system. This system combines the water's mechanical action and temperature to melt the snow. This system can only be used where ground temperatures do not regularly drop below 0 °C; otherwise, sheet ice formation could result (although a continuous water flow would act as an impediment to this).

In Niigata, Japan, relatively inexpensive hot water bubbles up through holes in the pavement to melt snow, though this solution is only practical within a city or town. Some individual buildings may melt snow and ice with electric heating elements buried in the pavement, or even on a roof to prevent ice dams on the shingles, or to keep massive chunks of snow and dangerous icicles from collapsing on anyone below. Small areas of pavement can be kept ice-free by circulating heated liquids in embedded piping systems.

== Clearing by individuals ==
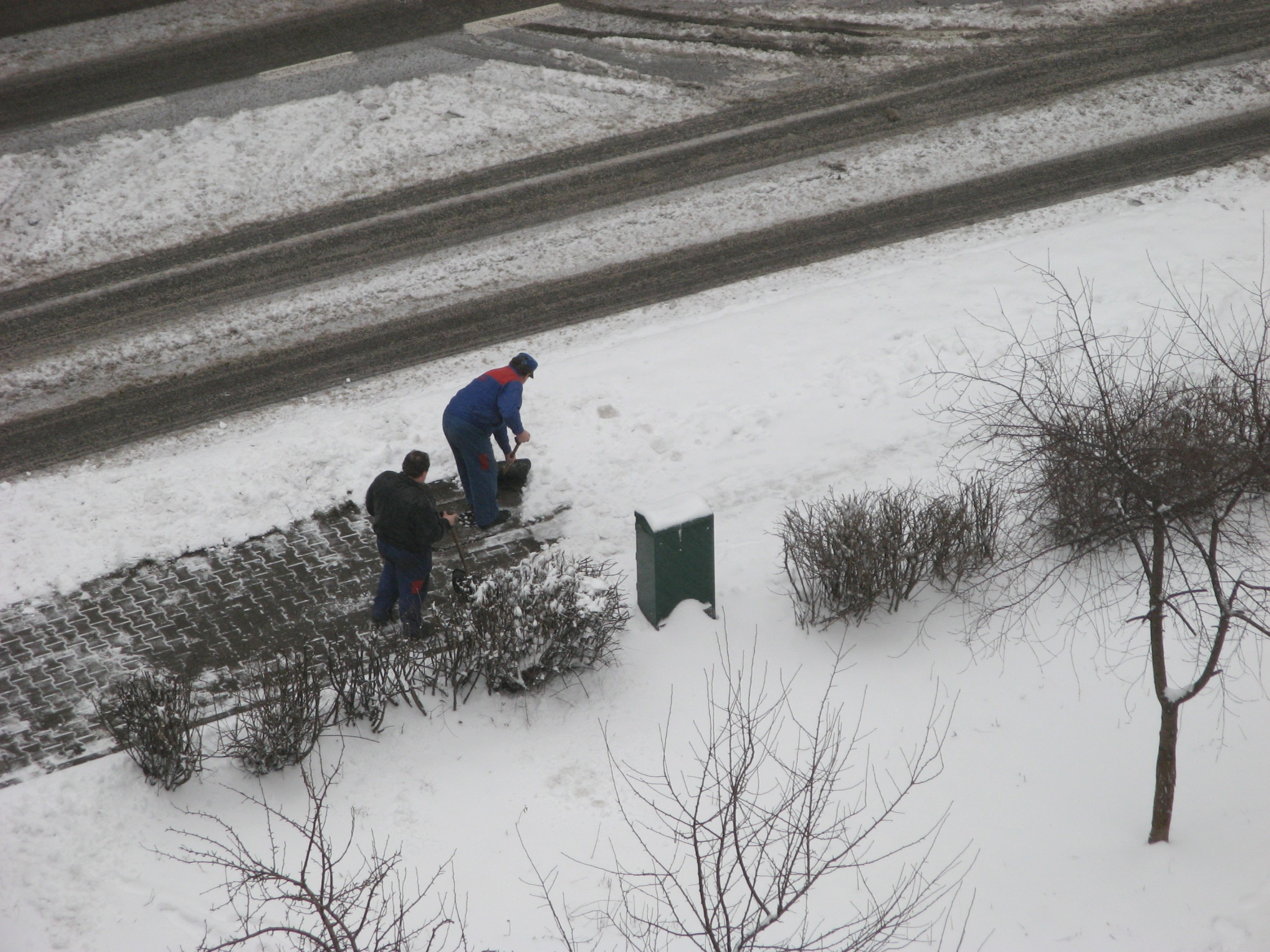
Manual snow removal

Snow removal two days after a record-breaking 45 cm of snow falls in Montreal.

Most snow removal by individuals is clearance of driveways and walkways. After heavy snowfalls, snow may be removed from roofs to reduce the risk of structural damage due to the weight.

In places with light snow, brooms or other light instruments can be used to brush off snow from walks and other surfaces. In regions with more precipitation, snow is commonly removed with snow shovels, a large lightweight shovel used to push snow and lift it, and snow scoops or sleigh shovels, a large and deep hopper-like implement fitted with a wide handle and designed to scoop up a load of snow and slide it on any slippery surface to another location without lifting. Other tools include snow pushers and shovels with one or more wheels.

Compared to other tasks of equal importance, snow removal presents a reverse age dynamic pertaining to overall community safety and efficient cooperation of skills. The relatively simple act of manual snow shoveling is statistically safer for teenagers than for adults, safer for boys than for men, and safer for children than for senior citizens. Shovelling entails a considerable amount of physical effort and can strain the back and the heart for those who lack good physical health, have heart problems, or who are largely sedentary. Each year many seniors and middle aged persons die from heart attacks while shovelling snow.

Snow blowers are often used by people unwilling or unable to perform this labour, people with large driveways or other substantial surfaces and people who live in areas with long lasting winters with large amounts of snowfall. Others may hire a contractor with a plow bearing truck or a shovel. After a large snowfall, businessmen with plow trucks often drive through cities offering to plow for money.

Removing ice is more difficult. Snow blowers are usually ineffective at clearing ice. Picks are sometimes used, but a solid spade can break through most ice. There is always the risk of damaging the pavement with these instruments. Icy areas can be covered with salt or some other substance, bags of which are widely available.

A recent technological advance is the snowmelt system that heats the pavement from below and melts snow and ice after a period of time. Such systems are expensive to install and operate and they are not cost effective in areas with very low winter temperatures and large snowfalls.

Some governments, Boy Scout troops, and adult volunteer agencies offer free snow clearing for the elderly and others in need. In some cities, snow clearing for elder and handicapped residents counts towards community service hours assigned as a punishment for minor offences.

In many places, laws require homeowners to clear snow from the public sidewalk in front of their house, as well as a pathway on their own property to their mailbox. Traditionally, this creates a unique opportunity for neighborhood youth to make legitimate money. Homeowners who fail to clear sidewalks, depending on the jurisdiction's laws, may experience fines and may be civilly liable for injuries suffered by another on a surface that they were required to clear. In some jurisdictions, such as New York, even private home owners who do clear their pathways can be held civilly liable for others' injuries incurred by falling in areas that have been cleared.

Cleaning off and freeing one's vehicle is another matter. Some people who need their vehicles will only do barely what is necessary in order to drive the vehicle and remove it from its space. Failure to clear all the snow and ice from a vehicle causes hazards by impairing the driver's visibility, and ice from the roofs of driven vehicles can cause crashes. In some jurisdictions, motorists who fail to clear snow from their vehicle entirely may be fined. Others may be more thorough in this process.

In some urban residential areas with curbside parking, residents use objects to mark the spaces they dug out so they can reclaim their space upon their return.

A leaf blower is sometimes used to blow light powder snow from vehicles, driveways, walkways, and decks. This only works well for very light powder snow.

== Clearing by the owners of contiguous lands or buildings ==
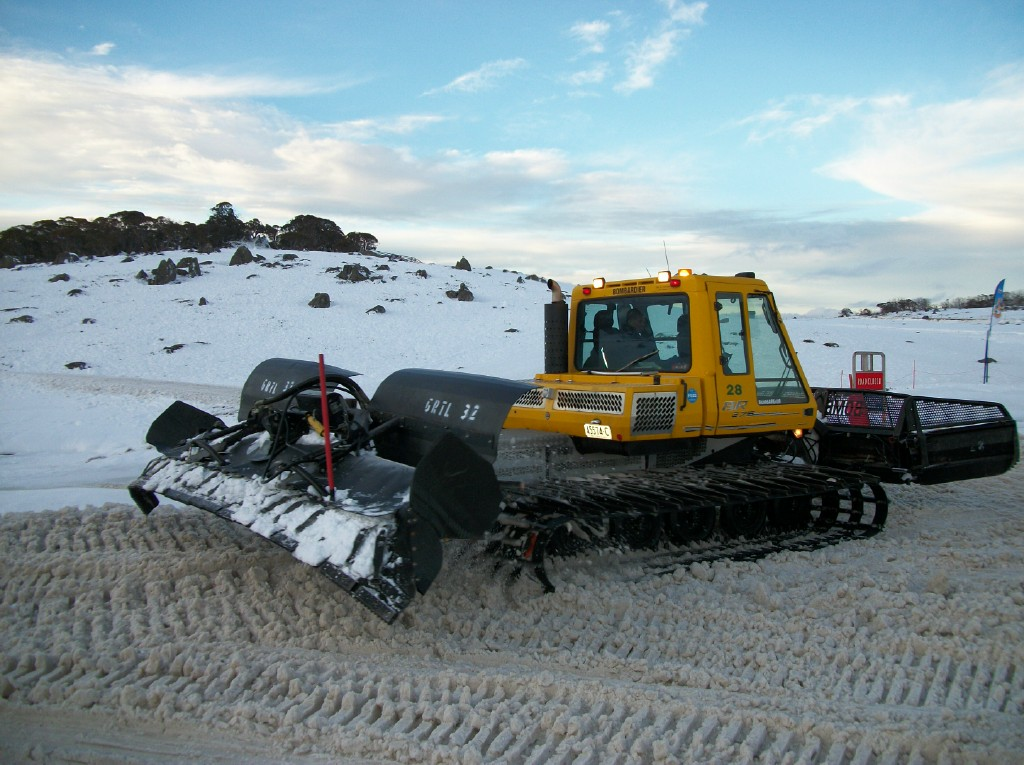
A snow grooming machine at Perisher Ski Resort, Australia

In some countries, keeping sidewalks clear and safe in winter is a duty of the owner of the contiguous land or building. The owner can be an individual inhabitant, in case of a family house, but also the municipality, municipal district or their specific organization or a housing co-operative or some other company (especially if some office or industrial object is concerned). Owners of large buildings or building complexes generally have mechanized snow-removal equipment, but individual house owners mostly clean the sidewalk with hand tools.

One example of the longstanding debate over the obligation of snow removal comes from the Czech Republic. In Prague, evidence of such a duty is documented since 1838. The decree of the government of the Protectorate of Bohemia and Moravia No. 1/1943 Sb. said that sidewalk cleaning in residential areas of municipalities with more than 5000 inhabitants, of district cities and of other specified municipalities is a duty of the owner or user of the contiguous land. The municipality was empowered to undertake this duty at the expense of the contiguous land owner. The Czechoslovak Road Act No. 135/1961 Sb. (§23) adopted such legal regulations for all municipalities, but municipality offices could modify them. The new Road Act of the Czech Republic, No. 13/1997 Sb. (§9 art. 4) left this enactment in place and stated that maintenance of a road, path, track etc. is an obligation of its owner without any exception. Despite this, §27 art. 4 attached to the owner of contiguous land the liability for harm caused by defects of cleaning. In its 2002 and 2003 annual reports, the Czech Public Defender of Rights made a claim for there being a discrepancy between the theoretical and the practical interpretations of the act and recommended that an unequivocal formulation be enacted. This discrepancy was repeatedly handled by the courts, and the Supreme Administrative Court on 27 June 2005 and the Constitutional Court on 3 January 2007 each stated that the cleaning duty results indirectly from the stated liability for harm. Those who impugn the duty argued that it is a residue of feudal corvée or of the totalitarian Nazi and communist regimes, that nowadays, compulsory labour mandated by law is in conflict with the Charter of Fundamental Rights and Basic Freedoms and that systematic municipal cleaning is more effective than cleaning by individuals. On 6 December 2007, the Senate of the Czech Republic proposed at the instance of its Constitutional Committee to remove the controversial article from §27 of the Road Act of 1997. The Czech Government gave support to it by a narrow majority. In a previous vote and after heated debate, the Chamber of Deputies of the Czech Republic had sanctioned this change by a margin of 116 to 31 amongst the 190 members present. Since 16 April 2009, the changes made by Act No. 97/2009 Sb. mandate that sidewalk cleaning is an obligation only of the owner of the walkway or road, i.e. generally the municipality. Despite the abolition of the duty, many people, including its opponents, declared that they will continue the winter cleaning of municipal sidewalks and paths, but instead will do so voluntarily and on their own behalf.

As was mentioned during the discussion in the Czech Parliament in a statement by the Czech Association of Cities and Municipalities, a similar duty belongs to owners of contiguous land exists in many other modern countries, e.g. Austria, France, the United States and some cities in Bavaria.

== Clearing by contractors ==
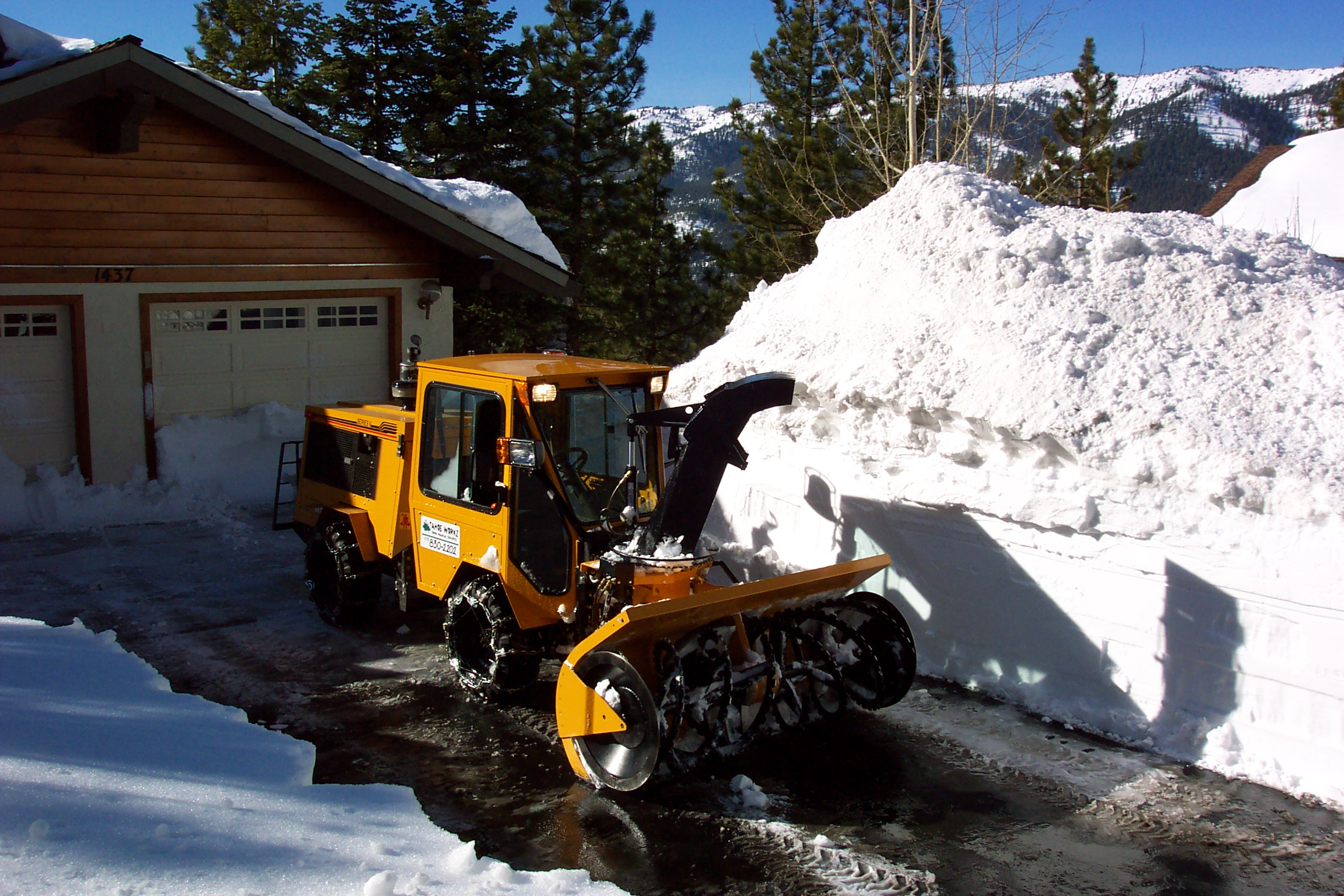
Clearing a residential driveway in Incline Village, Nevada

Video of snow removal on Rüütli street in Tartu, Estonia (December 2021)

Hiring a contractor with a winter service vehicle or a shovel.

In many high elevation or heavy snow accumulating areas, companies with snow removal equipment offer to provide services to remove the snow. Contractors may work on a per-time basis, full season contract, or will-call status. Per-time service (or per-push) is usually invoiced monthly and customers will be charged for each time services are provided. Some companies will charge per-time and per-inch where the depth of the snow is even taken into account. A full season contract is quoted and paid upfront at the start of the season and services will be provided automatically according to the contracted terms. Terms may sometimes differ between companies. For example, some full season contracts will expire after a certain amount of trips where others are unlimited. And finally, will-call service is where the client makes contact with the snow removal company to initiate a single clearing. This is not an automatic service and charges are usually higher for will-call jobs.

Snow removal services may include driveway and parking area snow removal, walkway and deck handwork, and roof clearing. Allowing snow to accumulate - especially on roofs where the weight of the snow may cause the structure to collapse - can be very dangerous. Contractors use hand shovels, walk behind snowblowers (or snow throwers), truck plows, skid-steers, light-weight tractors, and heavy front-end loaders. Many times, these machines will require use of tire chains to perform their tasks. Snow may be pushed by plowing methods or blown to an area of the property by snowblowers. Contractors may apply sand or salt in some locations to help melt ice accumulations.

Many snow removal contractors will require installation of snow poles or snow staking along the driveway. This is to keep equipment out of the landscaping and to help identify the perimeter of an area.

== Clearing by municipalities ==
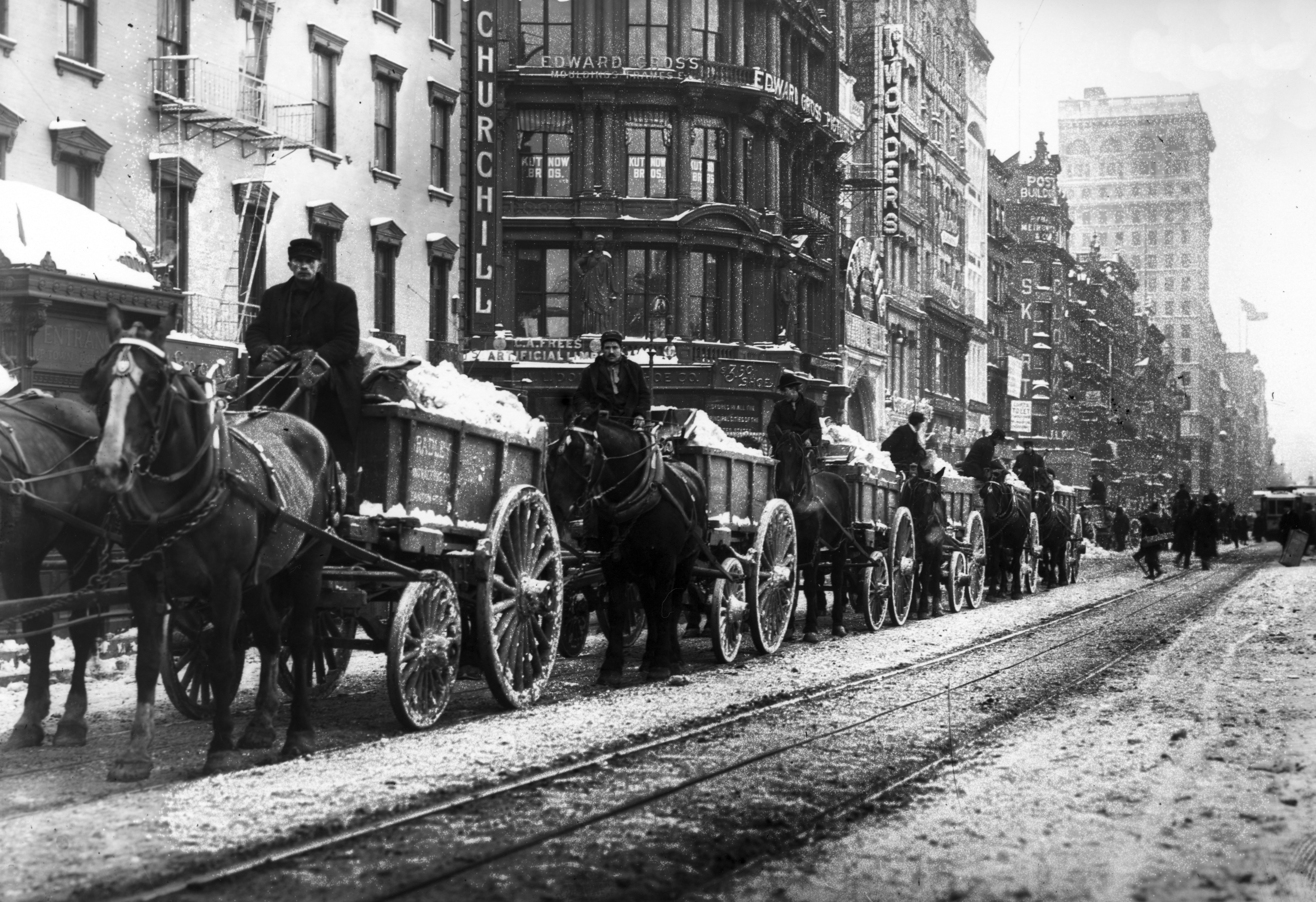
Line of horse-drawn wagons hauling snow in New York City, 1908.

Cities clear snow on a much larger scale than individuals. Most cities in areas that get regular snowfall maintain a fleet of snow clearing vehicles. The first to be dispatched are gritters who do some plowing but also salt the road. The salt, via freezing point depression, helps melt the snow and ice and also gives vehicles more traction. Later, usually when the snow has ceased falling, snow plows, front end loaders with snowplow attachments, and graders cover every street pushing snow to the side of the road. Salt trucks often then return to deal with any remaining ice and snow. The trucks generally travel much faster than the plows, averaging between 30 and 40 kilometers per hour. Most cities thus have at least twice as many plows as trucks. Smaller narrow body plows, with Caterpillar tracks or huge snow tires salt and clear sidewalks in some cities, but in many others with less snowfall and/or less pedestrian traffic individuals are tasked with clearing the sidewalk in front of their homes. Ecological movements often oppose this use of salt because of the damage it does when it eventually washes off the roads and spreads to the environment in general. Credit for the concept that municipalities should remove snow from public roadways usually goes to Edward N. Hines, a celebrated early 20th century transportation thinker who also was the first to put a painted center line stripe on an automobile-era road.

In cities where snow steadily accumulates over the winter it is also necessary to remove the piles of snow that build up on the side of the roads known as windrows or snowbanks. There are a number of methods of doing this. Pulling snow is done when temperatures rise high enough for traffic to melt snow. The windrows are then broken up and spread over the road. Casting is the moving of snow by means of a shovel or plow to nearby public lands. On boulevards or highways winging back is done, which consists of pushing the snow banks further from the road. The most expensive option, but necessary when there are no nearby places to dump the snow, is to haul it away (known as the loading stage). This is most often done by large self-propelled snowblowers that gather the piles of snow at the side of the road and load it into dump trucks. The snow is then dumped on the outskirts of town, or in a nearby lake, river or harbor. (Some jurisdictions have banned dumping snow into local bodies of water for environmental reasons since the collected snow is contaminated with melting salt, motor oil, and other substances from the roads they were removed from.) Snow melting machines may be cheaper than moving snow, depending on the cost of fuel and the ambient temperature.

The windrows created by the plows in residential areas often block driveways and imprison parked cars. The snow pushed there by any plow is a dense, packed version of "normal" fallen snow. When the temperatures are significantly below freezing this packed snow takes some of the characteristics of solid ice. Its removal is nearly impossible without mechanical means. Recently, windrows created in residential neighborhoods by city operated snow plows have resulted in the snow plow operators being assaulted by angry homeowners.

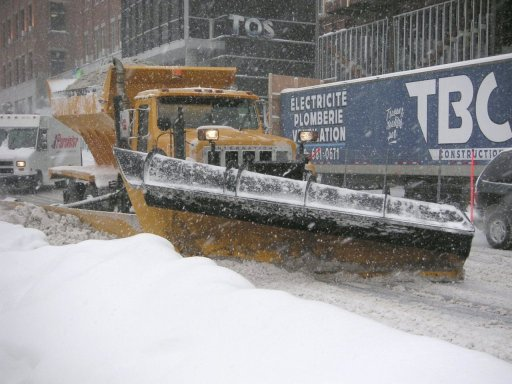
A street plow in Quebec City, Canada

The largest roads and highways are the first to be cleared; roads with steep hills or other dangers are also often a priority. Streets used by buses and other mass transit are also often given higher priorities. It often takes many hours, or even days, to cover every street in a city. In some places, a snow emergency will be declared, where automobile owners are instructed to remove their vehicles from the street (or one side of a street). If cars are in the way when the plows come around, they may be hauled away by tow trucks. Some communities have standing snow emergency rules in winter, in which vehicles may not be parked on streets overnight, whether it snows or not. After smaller snow storms only main roads are cleared while residential ones are left to be melted by passing traffic. Decisions on immediate removal versus "natural melting" can be hard to make because the inconvenience to citizens and the economy in general must be weighed against the immediate effect on the snow removal budget at that particular moment in the season.

It is estimated that Canada spends $1 billion annually on snow removal. In large cities with heavy snowfalls like Montreal and Ottawa, the snow clearing expense for each season is an important part of the seasonal public works budget and each snow storm provokes a major logistical operation involving thousands of employees working in shifts 24 hours a day. The effort can vary greatly depending on the amount of snow. Montreal gets about 225 cm of snow each winter and spends more than $158 million Canadian (2013) each year to remove it. Toronto, with about 50 per cent more population and 28 per cent more road surface, gets only 125 cm of snow a year and spends about half that. The higher cost in Montreal is due to the need to perform "snow removal" (the loading stage where snow is hauled away) consistently, necessitated by both the higher snowfall amounts and fewer melting days there, as opposed to simple "snow clearing" that usually suffices in other cities with less snowfall.

In Helsinki, Finland, the amount of snow transported from streets and properties to snow dump sites during the winter of 2009–2010 was 210,000 truckloads, equaling over 3 million cubic meters.

Snow removal impacts the design of city infrastructure. Where possible, street boulevards are wider to accommodate the windrows and sidewalks are not right next to the street. Fire hydrants will have tall flags to locate them under the windrows. Reflective traffic lane markers embedded in the roadbed is not possible (or much harder) due to risk of damage by plows. Access to snow dumping locations (e.g. ravines) by heavy equipment is also planned.

The employees who take part in snow removal are generally the same workers who do road maintenance work during the summer months, but in some US cities garbage trucks are also equipped with plows and used for snow removal. Many smaller US communities sign contracts with insurance companies, under which the insurance company assumes the risk of a heavy winter. The insurance company of course sets the rates such that averaged over time they will make a profit; the town is willing to overpay for snow removal in mild winters in order to avoid the risk of running dramatically over budget in the occasional severe winter.

Large organizations such as universities and airports also often have their own mechanized snow clearing force. Public transit systems generally clear bus stops while post offices clear around mail boxes. Railroads have their own snow clearing devices such as rotary snowplows.

Airports, with their associated runways, taxiways and ramp areas are an exception to the use of salt, as the metals used in aircraft construction will corrode causing safety issues.

== Snow dump sites ==
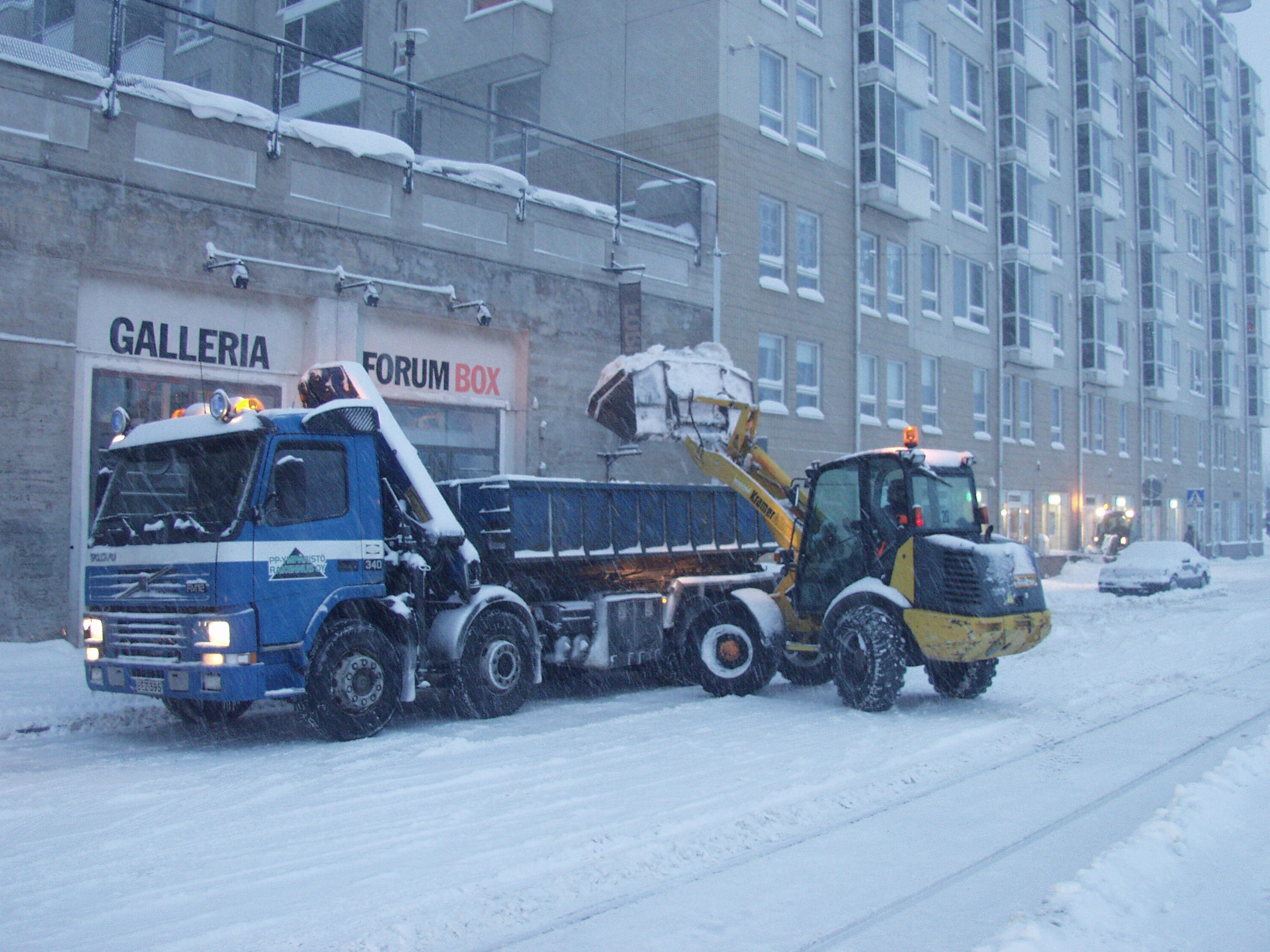
Snow in Helsinki being loaded on truck for transportation to a snow dump site

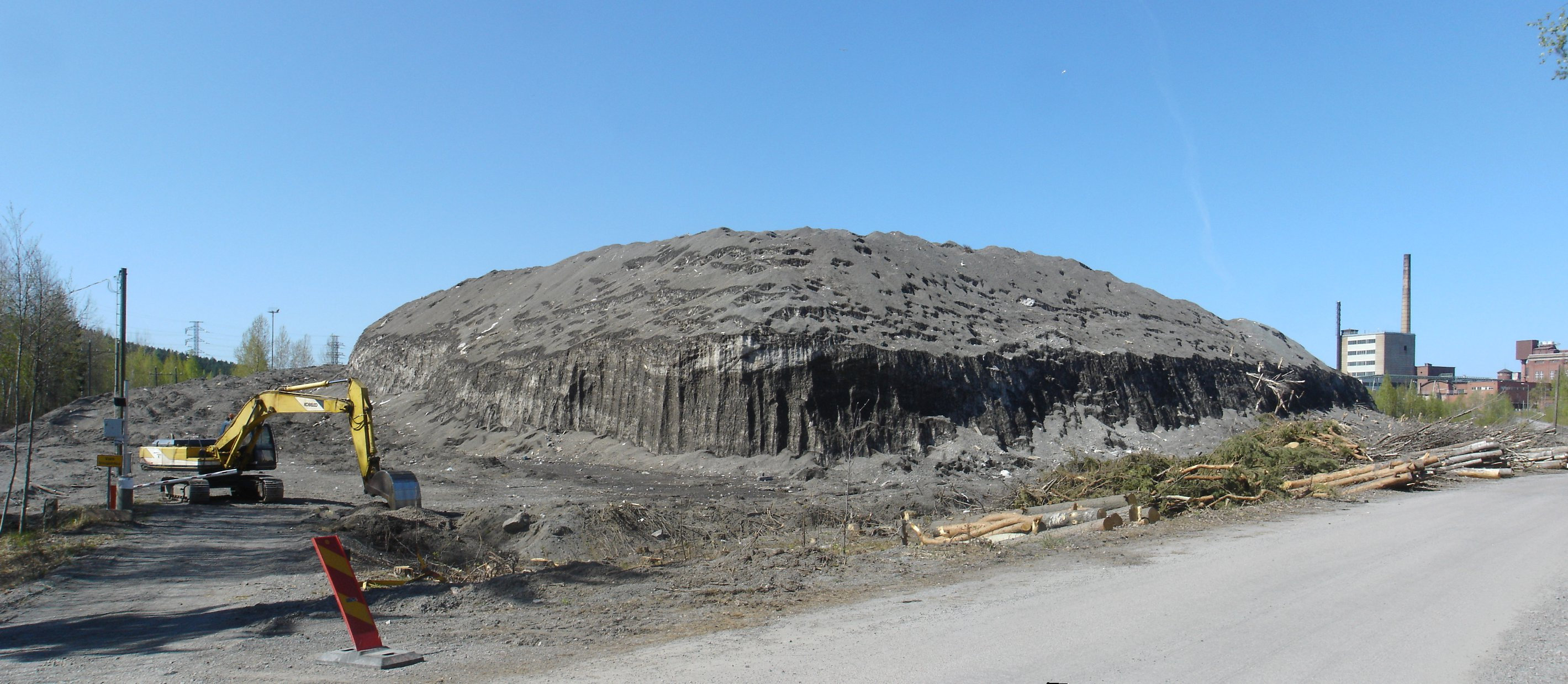
Snow dump site in Tampere. Melting has already begun and mostly sand and dirt is visible.

A snow dump site is a location where snow is dumped as a part of the snow removal process. Designated sites are sometimes required to prevent water and ground pollution because the snow collected on roads typically contain a variety of grit, de-icing chemicals, vehicle fluids, engine emissions, and litter. Some pollutants become diluted and wash away with the melt-water and some concentrate at the dump site. Dumping into fresh water is "...almost universally prohibited due to the serious impact that deicer salts can have on freshwater aquatic life." In the United States dumping snow into water bodies is not specifically prohibited by the Clean Water Act or the Ocean Dumping Act. The states and local governments determine their own dumping policies.

Snow dump site selection is based on the availability of suitable land and pollution prevention factors that may include distances from lakes and streams, installation of silt fences, soil and aquifer type, and other factors. Some sites may use filters and settling ponds to help prevent the pollution from spreading. Occasionally an excessive amount of snow must be dumped and is sometimes allowed to be legally dumped into water bodies on an "emergency only" basis.

== Surface treatments ==
The surface is treated primarily by snow removal. Roads are also treated by spreading various materials on the surface. These materials generally fall into two categories: chemical and inert. Chemical (including salt) distribution induces freezing-point depression, causing ice and snow to melt at a lower temperature. Chemical treatment can be applied as a preventive measure and/or after snowfall. Inert materials (i.e. sand, brash, slag) make the surface irregular to improve traction. Both types can be applied together, but the inert materials tend to lower traction once the snow and ice has melted.

Chemical treatment materials include:

- Sodium chloride (common table salt, NaCl)
- Calcium chloride (CaCl_{2})
- Potassium chloride (KCl)
- Magnesium chloride (MgCl_{2})
- Ammonium nitrate (NH_{4}NO_{3})
- Ammonium sulfate [(NH_{4})_{2}SO_{4}]
- Potassium acetate (CH_{3}COOK)
- Urea [(NH_{2})_{2}CO]
- Propylene glycol (C_{3}H_{8}O_{2})
- Calcium magnesium acetate (C_{4}H_{6}O_{2}Ca and C_{4}H_{6}O_{2}Mg)
- Sodium ferrocyanide (hydrous, Na_{4}Fe(CN)_{6}•10H_{2}O)
- Methyl alpha-D-glucopyranoside (C_{7}H_{14}O_{6})

In the European Union, 98% of chemical treatment materials used in 2000 were sodium chloride in various forms. It is effective down to −5 °C, at the most −7 °C. For colder temperatures, calcium chloride (CaCl_{2}) is added to NaCl in some countries, but deployment is limited as it costs about 6 times as much as sodium chloride. Other substances were used rarely and experimentally. Alternative substances (urea, alcohols, glycols) are often used at airports. In recent years, Geomelt, a combination of salt brine and beet juice that is otherwise considered a waste product has been used for pretreatment. In Wisconsin, USA, surplus brine from cheese making has been used for this purpose.

Inert spreadings can be:

- sand
- brash, rubble, crushed slag, etc.
- slag
- wood ash (for household use only)
- sawdust

The choice of treatment may include consideration of the effect on vegetation, pets and other animals, the local watershed, and effectiveness with regard to speed and temperature. Some chemicals can degrade concrete, metals, and other materials. The resulting meltwater and slush can cause frost heaving if it re-freezes, which can also damage pavement. Inert materials can damage vehicles and create dust.

As an example, in the Czech Republic during the winter season of 2000/2001, net material expenditure for road treatment was: 168 000 tonnes of salt (mostly NaCl), 348 000 tonnes of sand and crushed stone and 91 000 tonnes of other materials like slag. In Ireland, the annual expenditure of salt was 30 000 tonnes. Switzerland reports their annual expenditure as 600 grammes of salt to every square metre of roads on average.

=== Side effects ===
De-icing chemicals and inert materials need to be selected and applied with care.

Chemicals may react with infrastructure, the environment, and vehicles. Chlorides corrode steel and aluminum in reinforced concrete, structures and vehicles. Acetates can cause asphalt stripping, weakening the bond between asphalt binder and aggregate. Sand and grit can clog pavement joints and cracks, preventing pavement from expanding in the summer and increasing stress in the pavement.

Salts can be toxic to plants and aquatic life, including the trees lining the side of the roads. Sand can alter aquatic habitats where roads are near streams and lakes. Acetates can reduce oxygen levels in smaller water bodies, stressing aquatic animal life. Sand can be ground by tires into very fine particulate matter and become airborne, contributing to air pollution.

== Snow removal tools ==
- Snow shovel
- Snow blower
- Snow pusher
- Snow vacuum
- Snowplow
- Ice pick
- Skid-steer loader
- Spade
- Winter service vehicle
- Snowmelter
- Snowmelt system embedded in pavement, also known as radiant heat.

== See also ==
- Deicing
- Grit bin
- Ice road
- Metromelt
- Snow removal in Montreal
- Parking chair
- Road slipperiness
- Snow emergency
- Smart highway
- Snow chains
- Snow filtration
- Snowplow
- Snowmelt system
- Street sweeper
- Winter service vehicle
