= Snow emergency =

Government response to a major snow storm

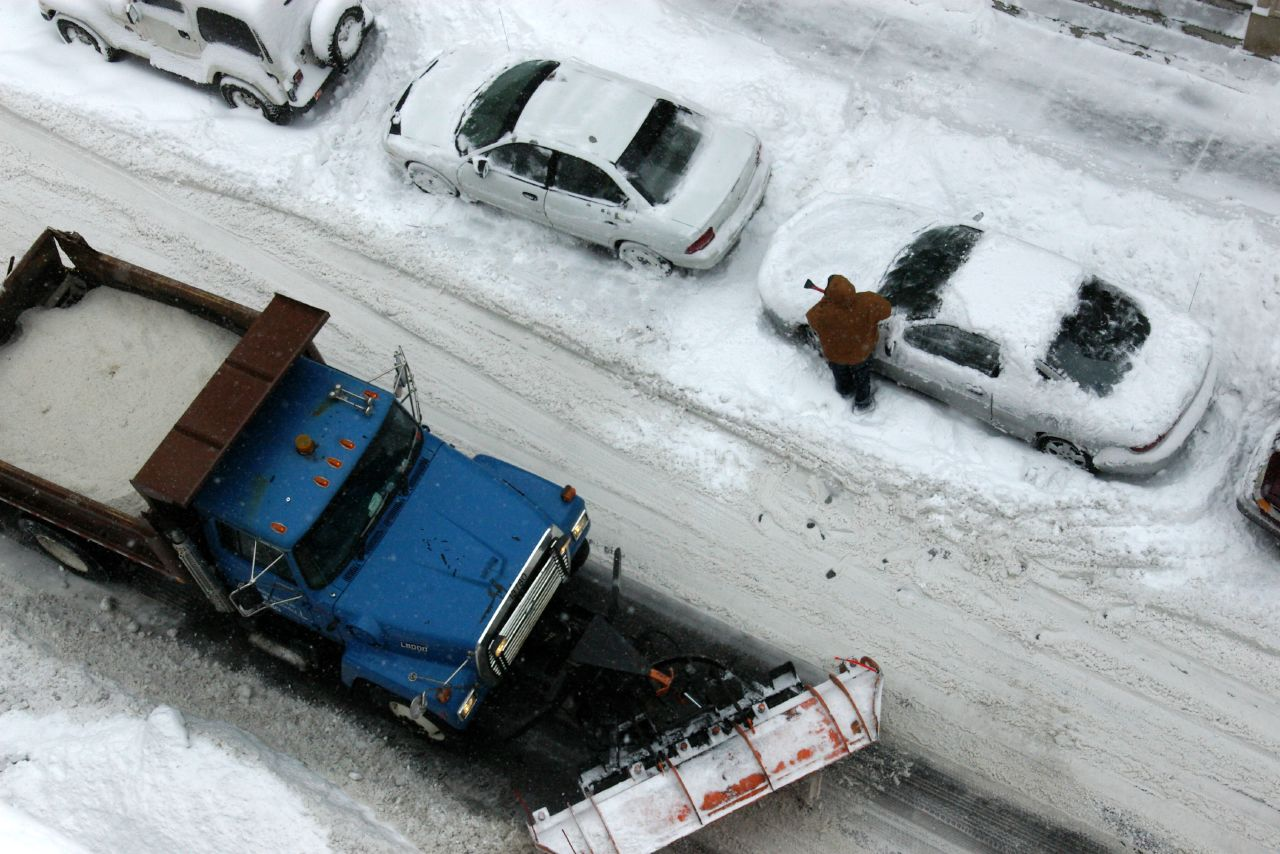
A snow emergency in Minneapolis.

A snow emergency is the active response plan when a snow storm severely impacts a city, county or town in the United States or Canada. Schools, universities, government offices, airports and public buildings may close during a snow emergency to prevent injuries during attempted travel; parking restrictions also usually go into effect to allow snowplows to clear the roads and streets effectively. The precise meaning of "snow emergency" varies depending on the issuing municipality. Snow emergencies are a common occurrence during the winter snowfall season in the Northern United States. The general public is alerted to snow emergency status via local broadcast stations, reverse 911 calls, mass text messaging services, public address systems, or lighted signals.

Typically, a snow emergency is declared by the mayor or other chief executive official of a jurisdiction. The declaration is usually issued after the winter storm has impacted a city or county. Winter Storm Warnings, Lake Effect Snow Warnings, Blizzard Warnings, and Winter Weather Advisories issued by the National Weather Service are taken into account when declaring a snow emergency.

During life-threatening winter storms, a state of emergency may be declared for an entire state. This allows additional measures to be taken by the executive, such as banning driving, enforcing a curfew, and deploying personnel, equipment, shelters, or financial resources that would be otherwise unavailable.

== Examples ==
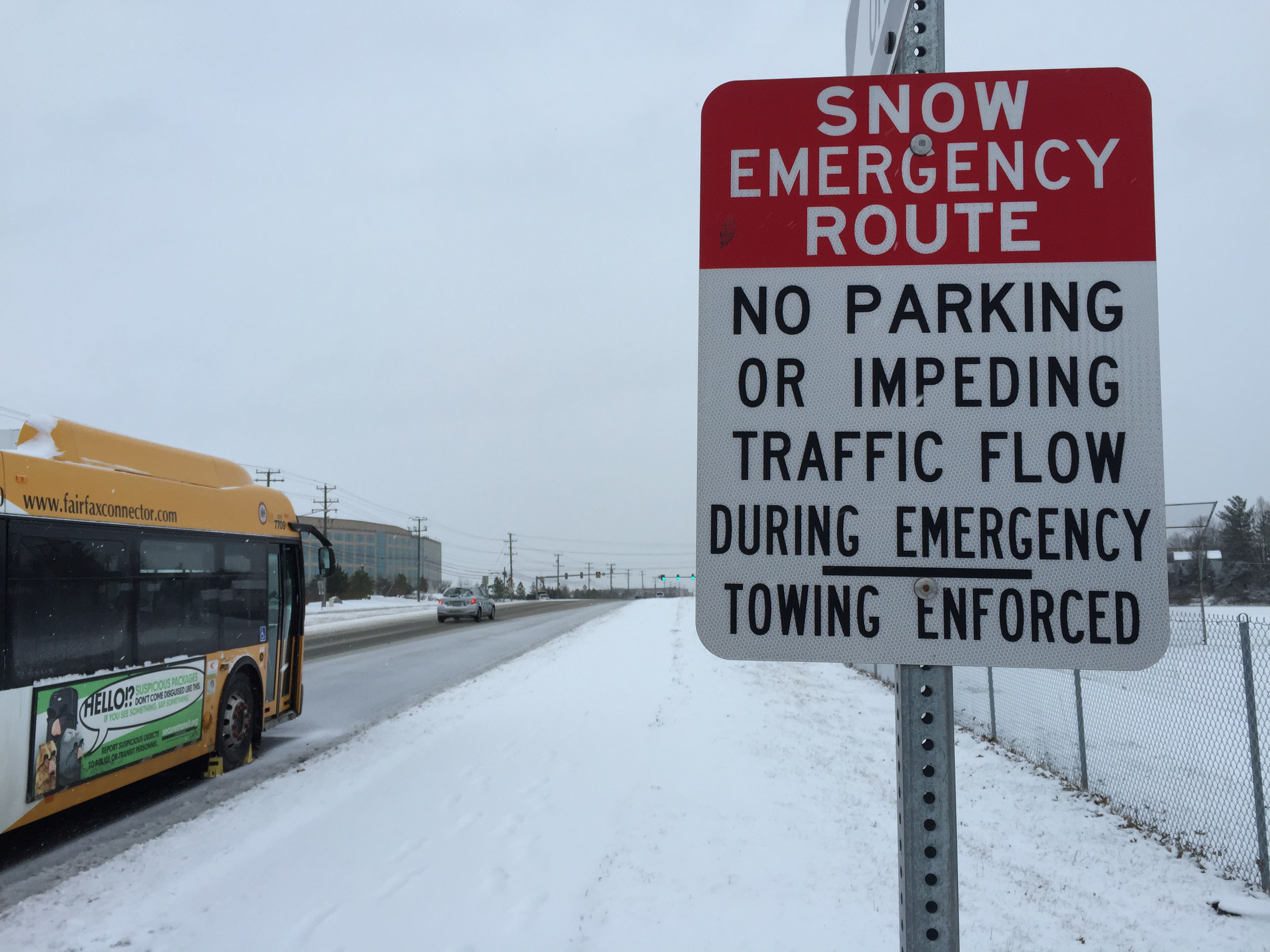
Sign designating a snow emergency route in Virginia

Many cities in the Upper Midwest define a snow emergency as a predefined-duration period of specific parking rules to allow snowplows to move about the entire breadth of every city street.

Cities such as Minneapolis follow a 3-day snow emergency plan, where main routes are plowed on day one. After the main routes are plowed, the even numbered side of the street is plowed on day two, then the odd side of the street is plowed.

Cities such as Saint Paul, Minnesota use the day-night plow protocol. Streets that are declared "night plow" routes are plowed as soon after the snow emergency is declared. Then on the second day, daytime plow routes are plowed.

On the other hand, Ohio snow emergencies are declared by the county sheriff's department on one of three levels; each level defines the recommended or mandated actions of the general public due to severe winter weather.

=== Snow route and winter parking restrictions in Canada ===
In many Canadian municipalities snow routes and snow removal parking restrictions are used during winter months, usually from December to March.

In Toronto snow routes are marked and used to ensure roads are cleared to allow for use by emergency vehicles and others who need to travel during snow emergencies. Signs with a stop sign crossed out with wording Snow Route are attached to poles along the route.

Parking restrictions are initiated to remind homeowners to remove vehicles from the streets to allow for snowplows to clear the roadway. Those vehicles found parked along the route will be ticketed and towed. These tend to be found in downtown areas where roads are usually narrow or residents need to park along the road.

== See also ==
- Parking space reservation in snowstorms
- Snow removal
- Winter service vehicle
