= Snow pusher =

Snow removal vehicle

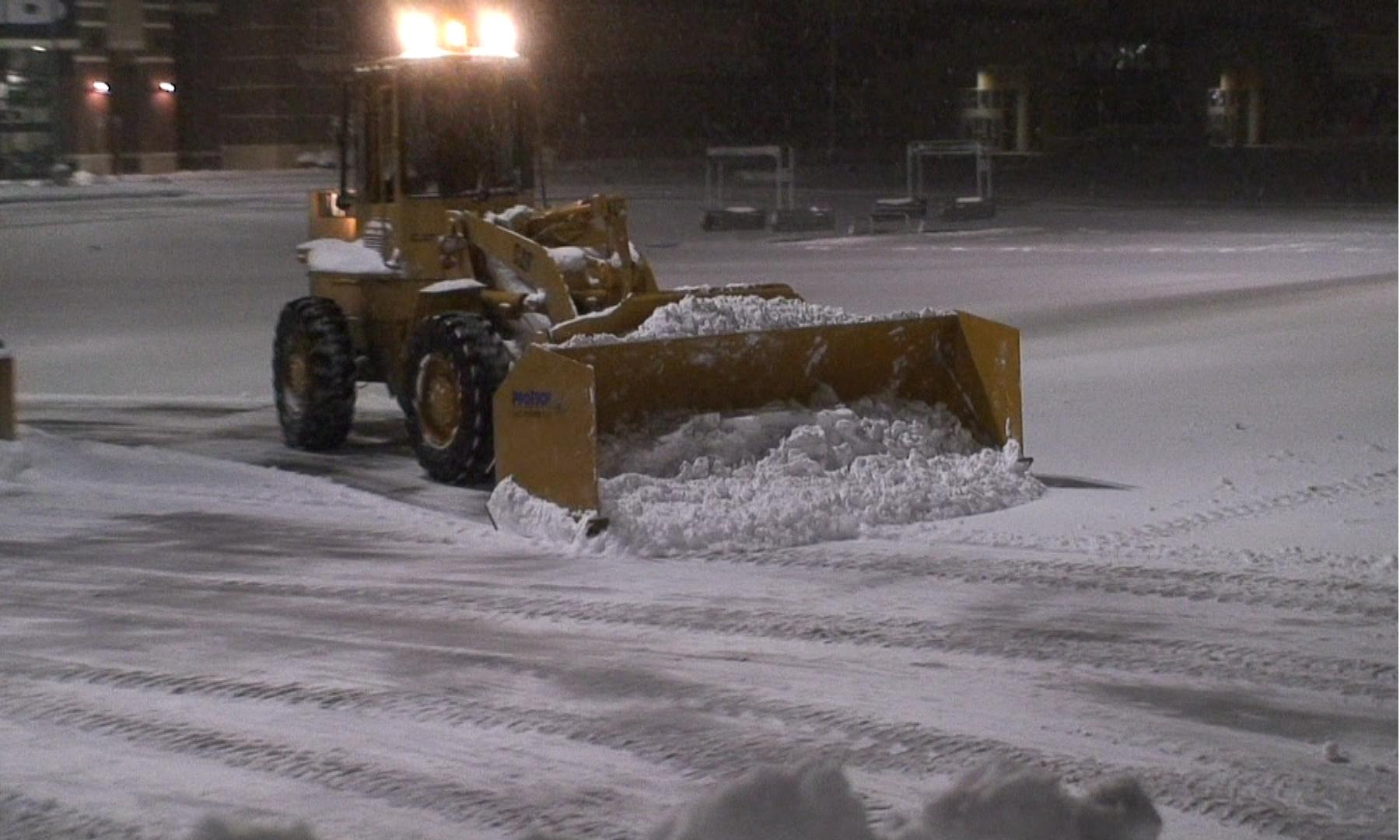
A loader Sno-Pusher in action

Snow pushers (also known as box plows, containment plows, or box style plows) are designed to move snow by pushing it straight ahead. They do this by being constructed with a curved moldboard that lies perpendicular to the direction of travel and a sidewall at either end that keeps the snow contained. For parking lots, runways, laneways, etc. this is an improvement on the traditional windrow plowing, which uses an angled plow to move snow to the side. Snow pushers allow the snow to be moved en masse and completely off site to be piled someplace out of the way.

== History ==
Although snow pushers did not become widely used until the 1980s, they have been around since the 1970s. Initially, they were not produced by manufacturers, but they were recognized as a good idea by snow removal professionals who either welded their own or contracted to have them fabricated. For a long time, the most common snow pusher design was to take a septic tank or other large steel cylinder and cut it in half, then build a mounting system on the back to attach it to a machine. This type of bare bones construction lasted until the 1990s when various manufacturers began producing them commercially.

== Design ==
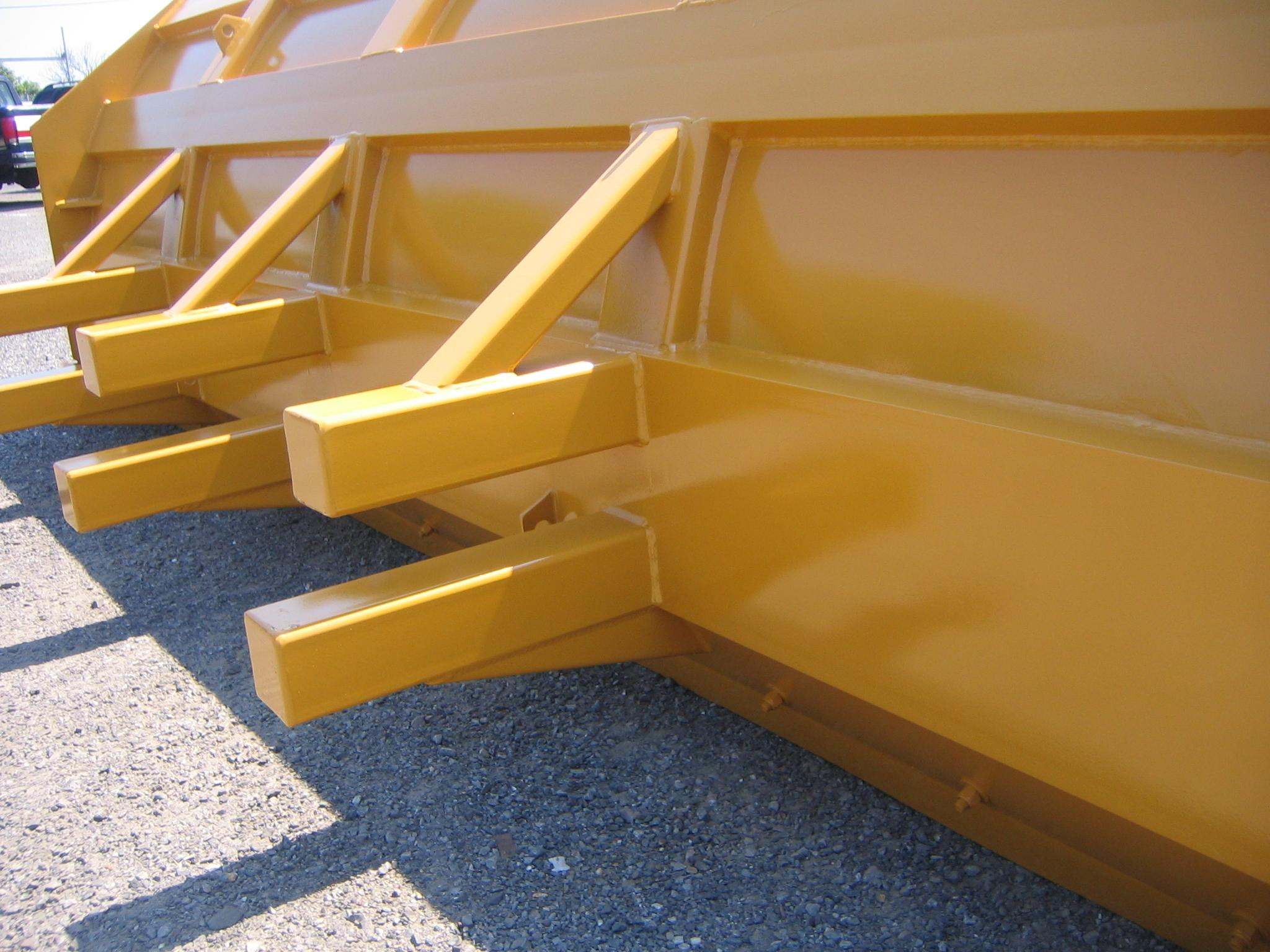
Universal Loader Mounting

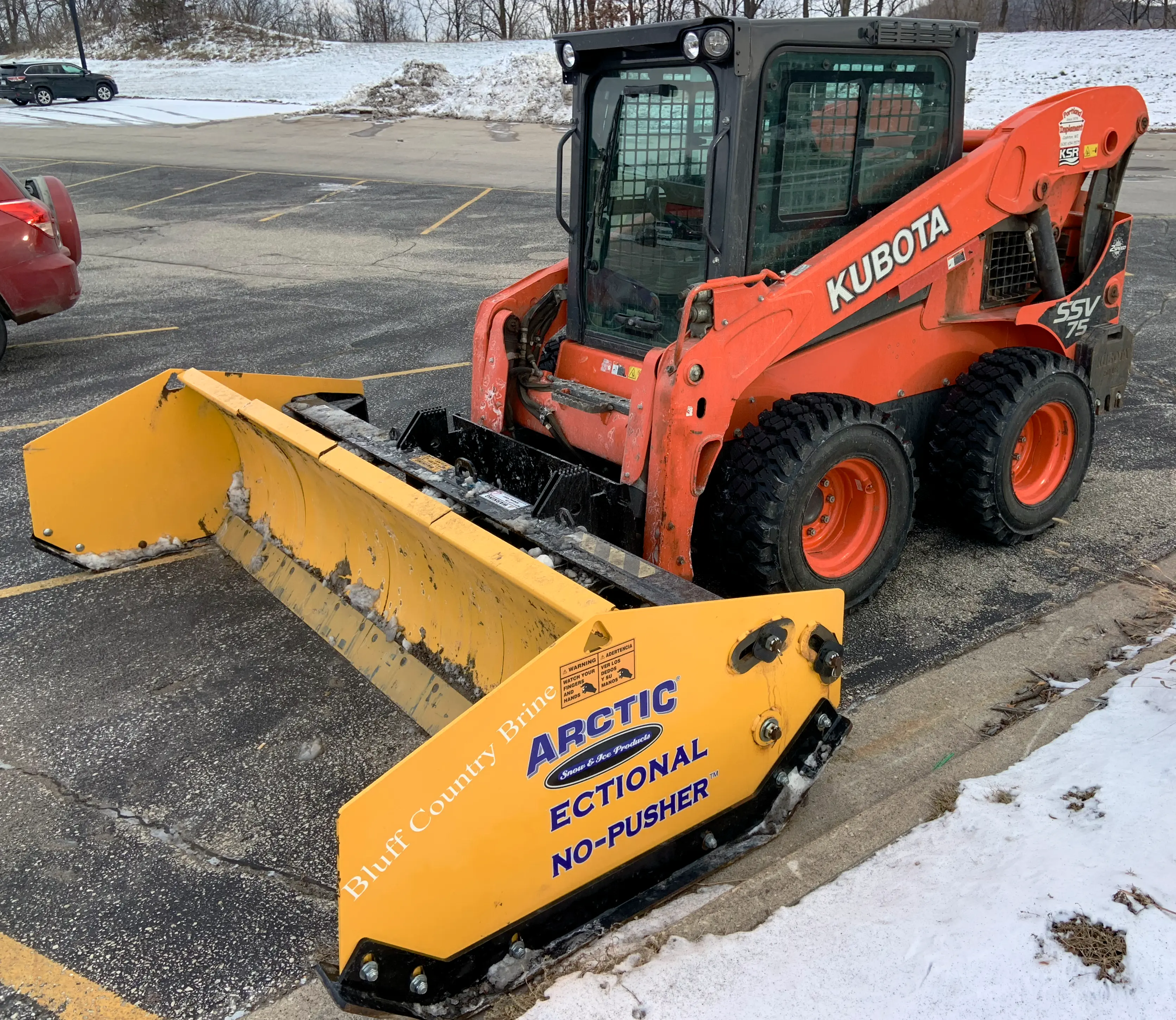
Snow pusher on a skid steer

Snow pusher designs vary across the industry. They are typically between 3 ft [0.9 m] and 5.5 ft [1.6 m] high and range from 6 ft [1.8 m] to 40 ft [12.2 m] wide. Snow pushers are typically mounted on wheel loaders, skid steers, or backhoes. For wheel loaders and backhoes, they are mounted using a universal mounting system that consists of a set of posts (or plates) between which the machine bucket is placed. Chains are attached to the snow pusher and the bucket and tightened using a chain binder. This system allows for snow pushers to be mounted on any machine without regard for brand-specific mounting brackets. Skid steer loaders can use the universal mounting system; however, most manufacturers typically offer skid steer snow pushers with a universally accepted quick-attach system. Though the snow pusher might seem like a simple product, there are many variations across the industry in areas such as moldboard height and angle, sidewall support system (post, wedge, or unsupported), trip edge system, shoe thickness, and rubber cutting edge quality, to name a few.

== Steel trip edge vs. rubber edge pushers ==
Snow pushers can be divided into two separate families: steel trip edge and fixed rubber edge. Both are used in the same fashion to move snow. Rubber edge snow pushers have a composite material mounted on the bottom of the moldboard which lies flush to the ground and keeps snow from passing under the pusher, getting a cleaner push than otherwise. Rubber edges are able to flex and pass over obstructions under most conditions.

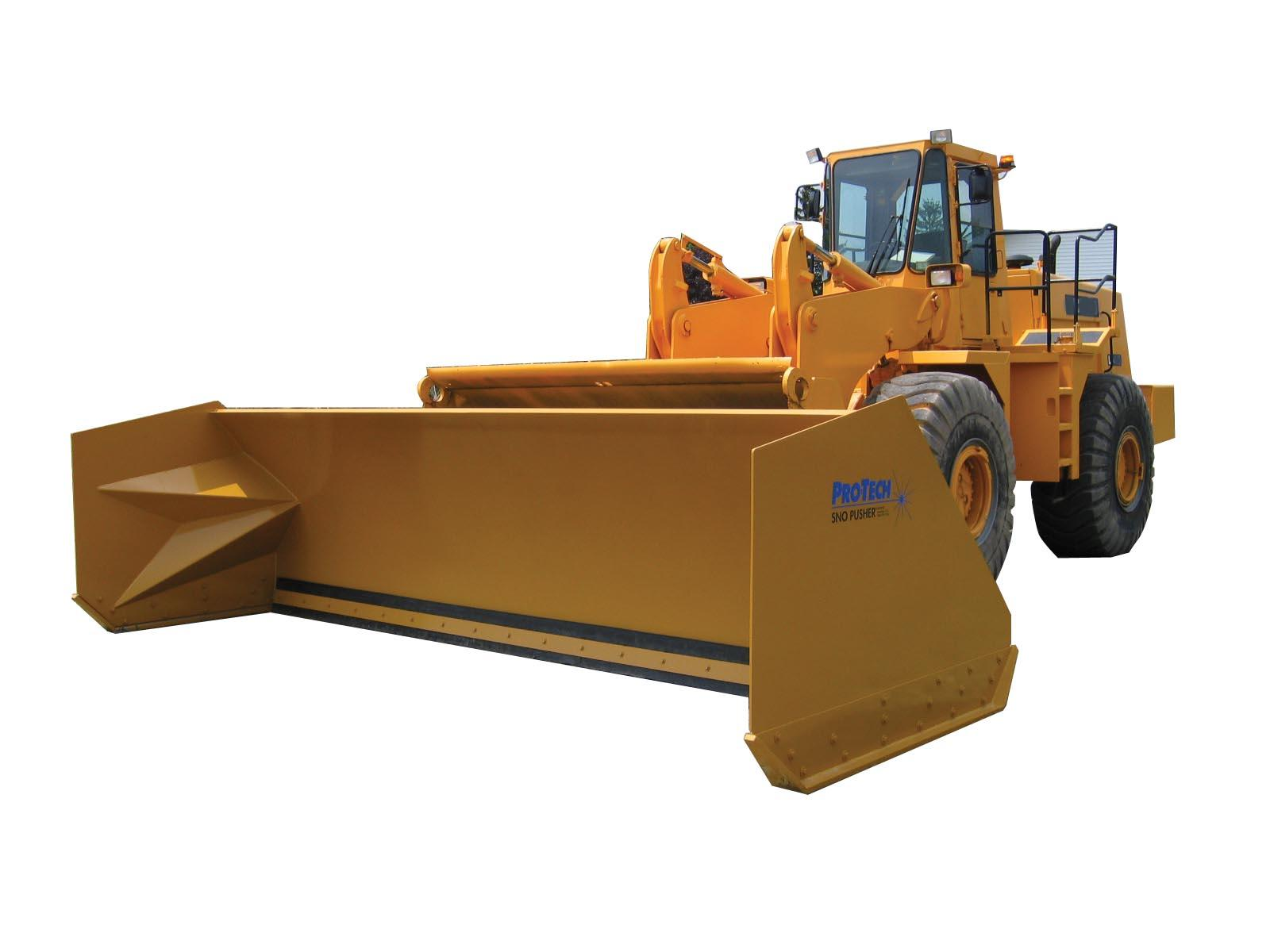
A pusher mounted on a loader

Steel trip edge snow pushers have a spring-loaded steel cutting edge mounted to the bottom of the moldboard that allow them to scrape the pavement. They employ a tripping system to allow them to pass over obstructions such as uneven pavement or raised manhole covers. There are three types of trip edges in use today: compression spring, torsion spring, and composite material springs. Both compression and torsion spring systems work similarly; the steel edge is mounted on a hinge and is held in place by the pressure of the springs; when the edge meets an obstruction the springs compress and allow the edge to flip back and under the pusher and to pass over the obstruction. Composite material trip edges can act like a rubber band when the edge meets an obstruction allowing the steel edge to flip under the pusher and then snap back into place.

During certain conditions where snow may tend to freeze to the ground, a steel edge may tend to clean better than rubber; however, during wet snowfalls a rubber edge will "squeegee" the pavement, leaving it much cleaner than a steel edge can. Also, rubber edges generally contour the ground much more effectively than steel because they flex over humps and into dips. One advantage of steel edges is the reduced drag they create. Rubber edges tend to act like a brake, taking much more power to push than a steel edge when scraping down to bare pavement. Both edges have their advantages and disadvantages, and while some companies have found ways to better contour pavement with a steel edge, their moving components may make them more fragile than continuously welded plows with rubber edges.

== See also ==
- Challenger Tractor
- Grader
- Snowplow
- Snow blower
- Snowmelt system
- Metromelt
- Rotary snowplow
- Wedge Plow
- Winter service vehicle
