= Snowplow =

Device for removing snow

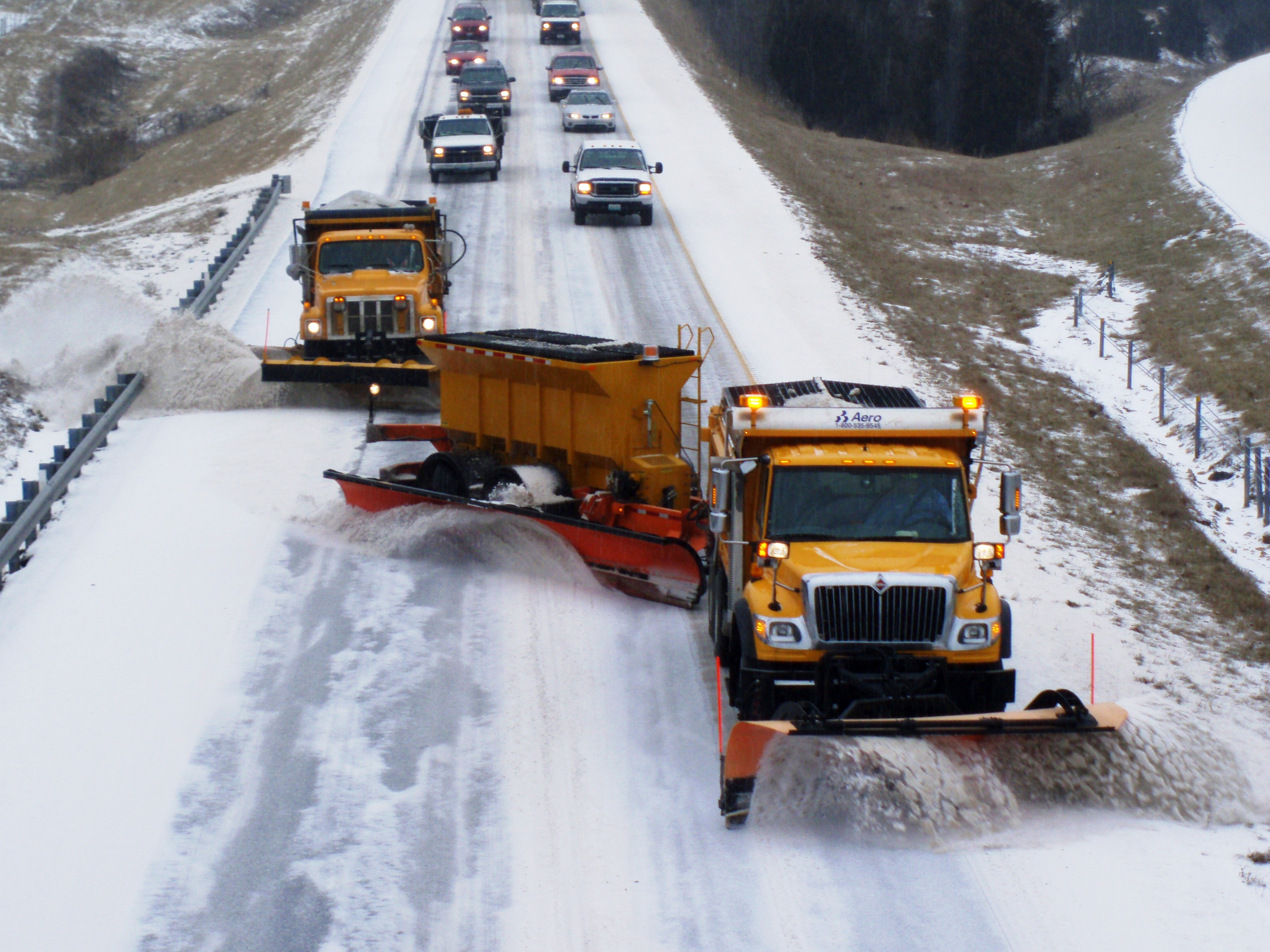
TowPlow truck operating on a Missouri rural Interstate

A snowplow (also snow plow, snowplough or snow plough) is a device intended for mounting on a vehicle, used for removing snow and ice from outdoor surfaces, typically those serving transportation purposes. Although this term is often used to refer to vehicles mounting such devices, more accurately they are known as winter service vehicles, especially in areas that regularly receive large amounts of snow every year, or in specific environments such as airfields. In other cases, pickup trucks and front end loaders are outfitted with attachments to fulfill this purpose. Some regions that do not frequently see snow may use graders to remove compacted snow and ice off the streets. Snowplows can also be mounted on rail cars or locomotives to clear railway tracks.

== Usage ==
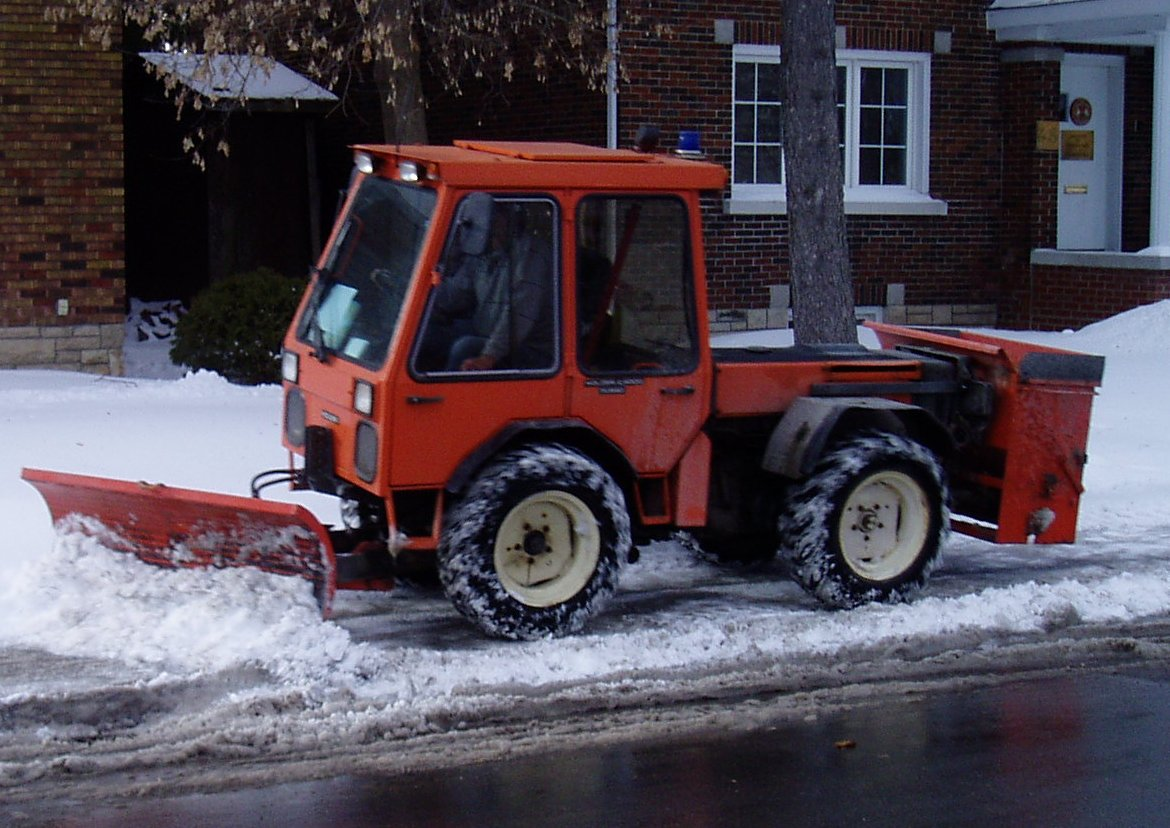
A small sidewalk clearing plow in Ottawa, Ontario, Canada

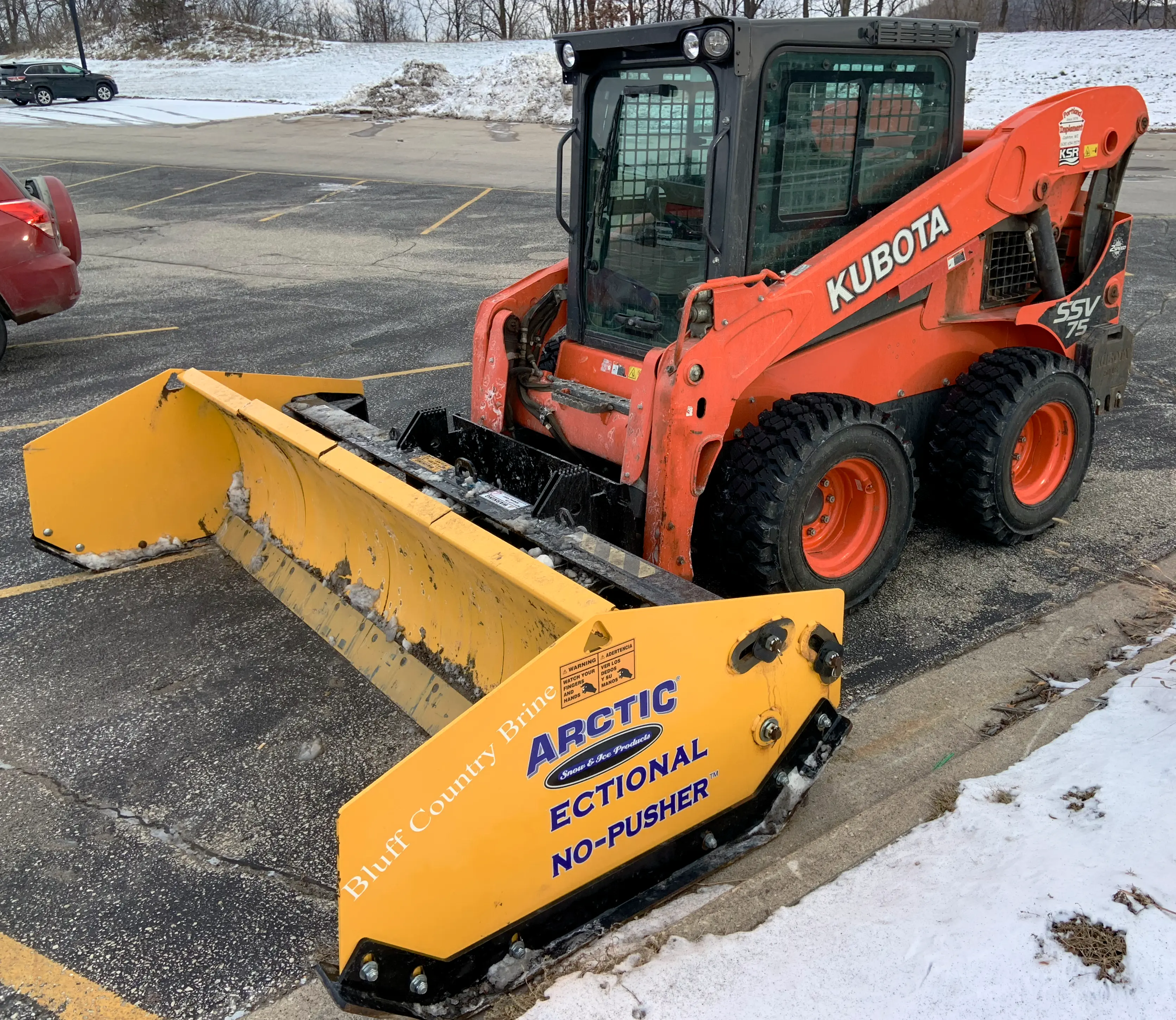
Snow pusher on a skid steer

Newer technology has allowed the use of articulated plow systems which can clear multiple divided highway lanes simultaneously; jurisdictions adopting this technology include the provinces of Alberta, British Columbia, New Brunswick, Ontario and Quebec in Canada, along with 21 states (Colorado, Connecticut, Delaware, Indiana, Kansas, Maine, Maryland, Massachusetts, Michigan, Minnesota, Missouri, Montana, New Hampshire, New York, North Dakota, Ohio, Oregon, Pennsylvania, Tennessee, Utah and Wisconsin) in the US.

== History ==
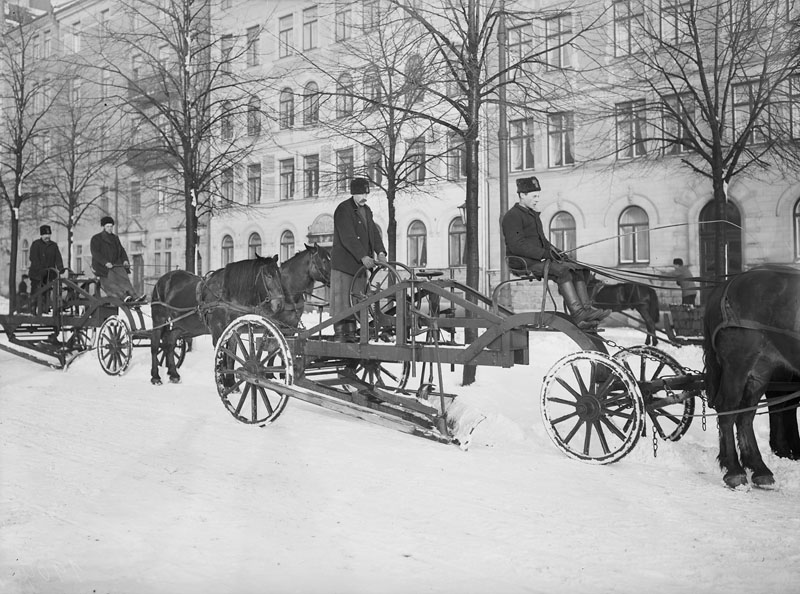
Snowplows in Sweden (1909)

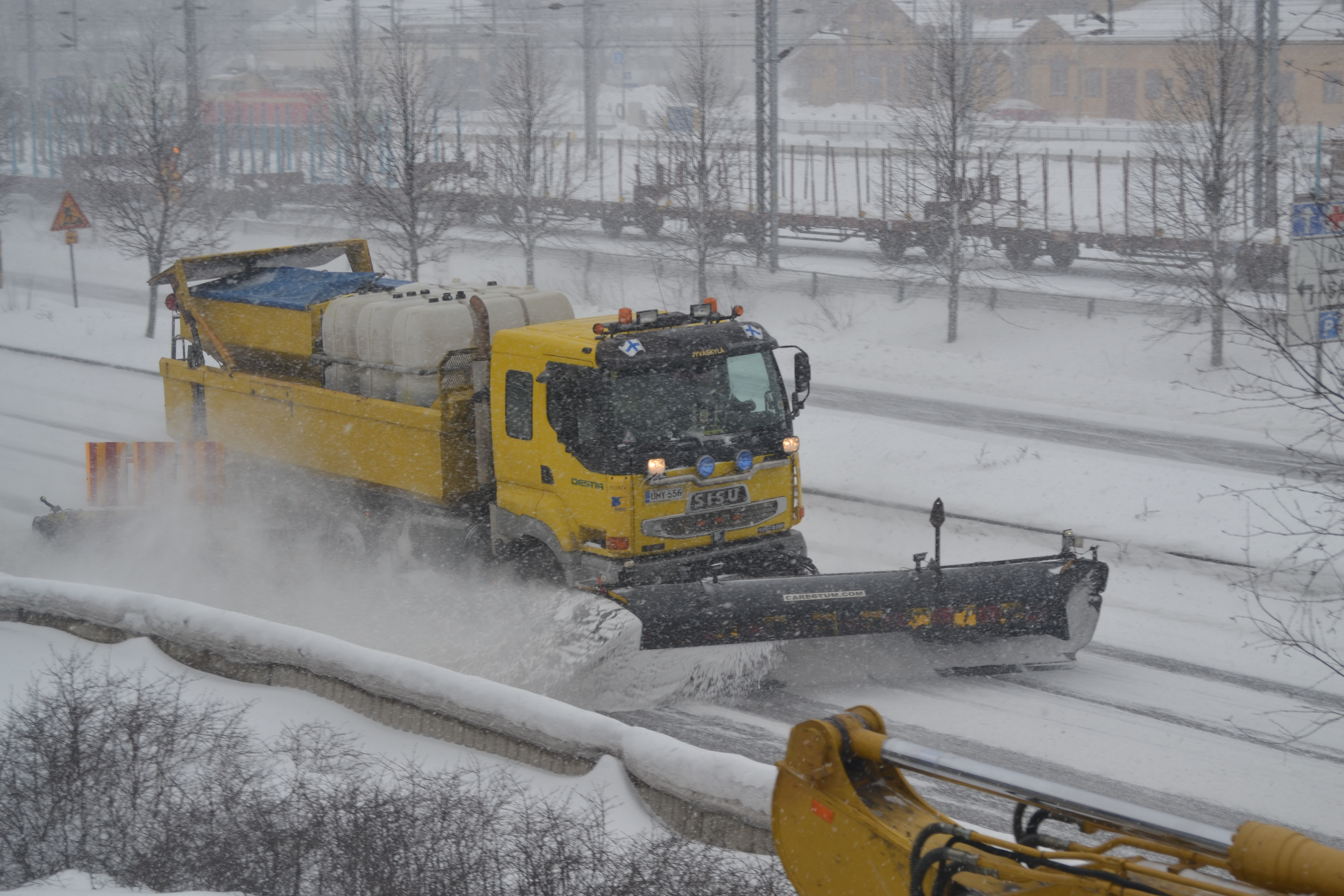
Snowplow plowing in Jyväskylä, Finland (2012)

The first snow plows were horse-drawn wedge-plows made of wood. The earliest reference found by the Oxford English Dictionary was written in 1792 in a description of New Hampshire:

When a deep snow has obstructed the roads, they are in some places opened by an instrument called a snow plough. It is made of planks, in a triangular form, with two side boards to turn the snow out on either hand.

With the advent of rail travel and later, the automobile, a number of inventors set about to improve existing snow plows. In the US, the "snow-clearer" is said to have been patented as early as the 1840s, for railways. The first snow plow ever built specifically for use with motor equipment was in 1913. It was manufactured by Good Roads Machinery in Kennett Square, Pennsylvania, and was designed to meet the requirements outlined by engineers of the New York City Street Cleaning Bureau. Good Roads is therefore unofficially credited as the originator of the modern snow plow, though their horse drawn steel blade road graders were used to clear roads of snow as early as the company's founding in 1878 under their original name American Road Machinery.

Carl Frink of Clayton, New York, was also an early manufacturer of truck-mounted snowplows. His company, Frink Snowplows, now Frink-America, was founded by some accounts as early as 1920. For the winter of 1919, Frink, owner of a tire and machine shop, manufactured and equipped a bus with a steel V-blade snowplow for a Clayton to Watertown bus line. In 1920, Frink equipped a Linn halftrack with a snowplow and side-blades for Black River Bus Lines and started his snowplow business. The Linn Co. immediately started to equip their halftracks with snowplows and heavily promoted their superior traction; they dominated the eastern market until the 1930s when the halftracks were supplanted by the much faster four-wheel drive trucks.

In 1923, the brothers Hans and Even Øveraasen of Norway constructed an early snowplow for use on cars. This proved to be the start of a tradition in snow-clearing equipment for roads, railways and airports, as well as the foundation of the company Øveraasen Snow Removal Systems.

== Railway snowplows ==
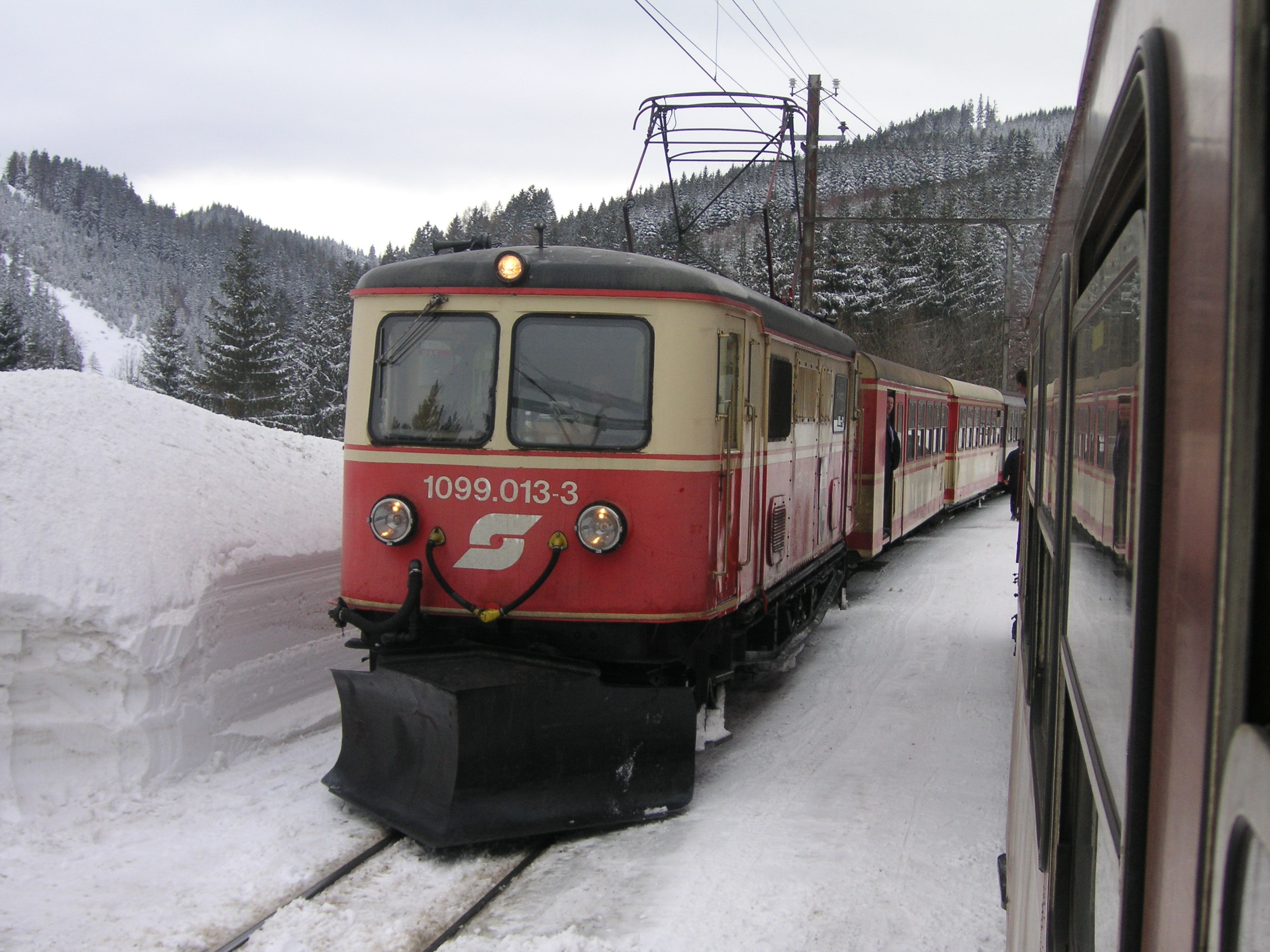
A small wedge plow mounted on a passenger train in Lower Austria

Via Rail, among other railways, has integrated plow blades with the front pilots of their locomotive fleet to clear thinner accumulations of snow as trains run.

== See also ==
- Challenger Tractor
- Grader
- Plow (disambiguation)
- Rotary snowplow
- Snow blower
- Snow emergency
- Snow pusher
- Snowmelt system
- Wedge plow
- Winter service vehicle
