= Snow shovel =

Tool

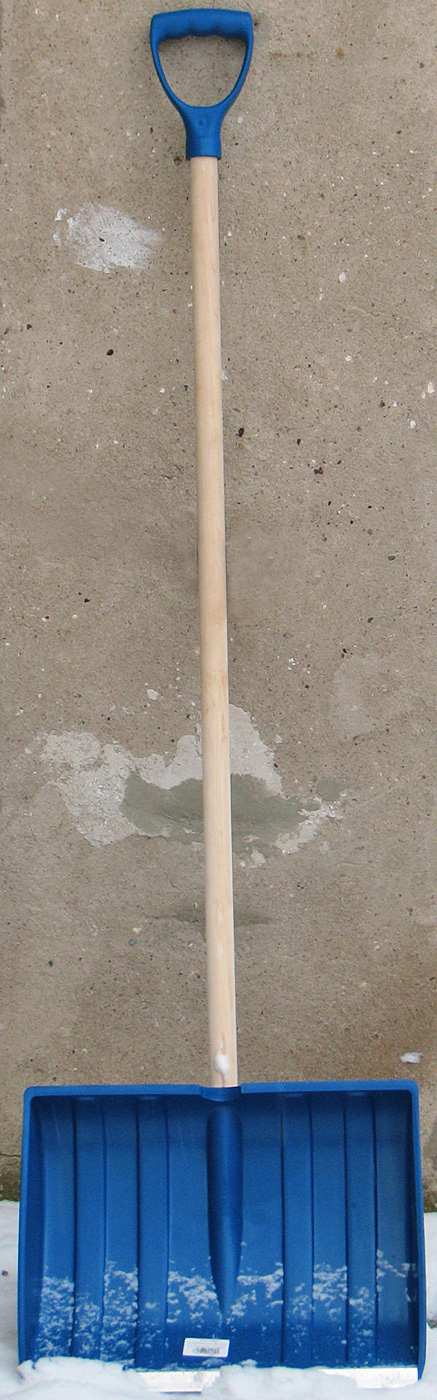
Traditional snow shovel

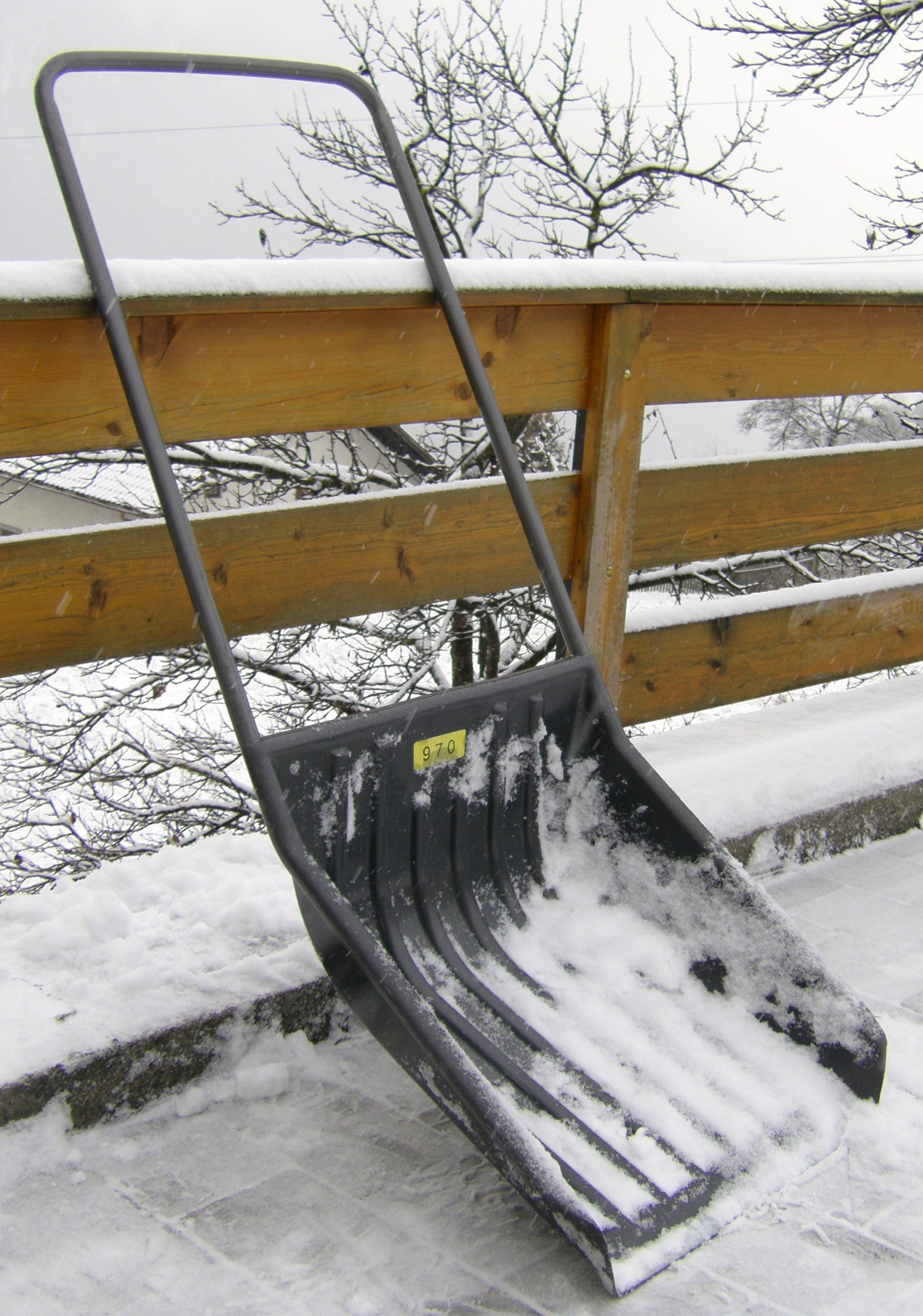
Modern snow sled shovel

A snow shovel is a specialized shovel designed for snow removal. Snow shovels come in several different designs, each of which is designed to move snow in a different way. Removing snow with a snow shovel has health and injury risks, but can also have significant health benefits when the snow shovel is used correctly.

== History ==
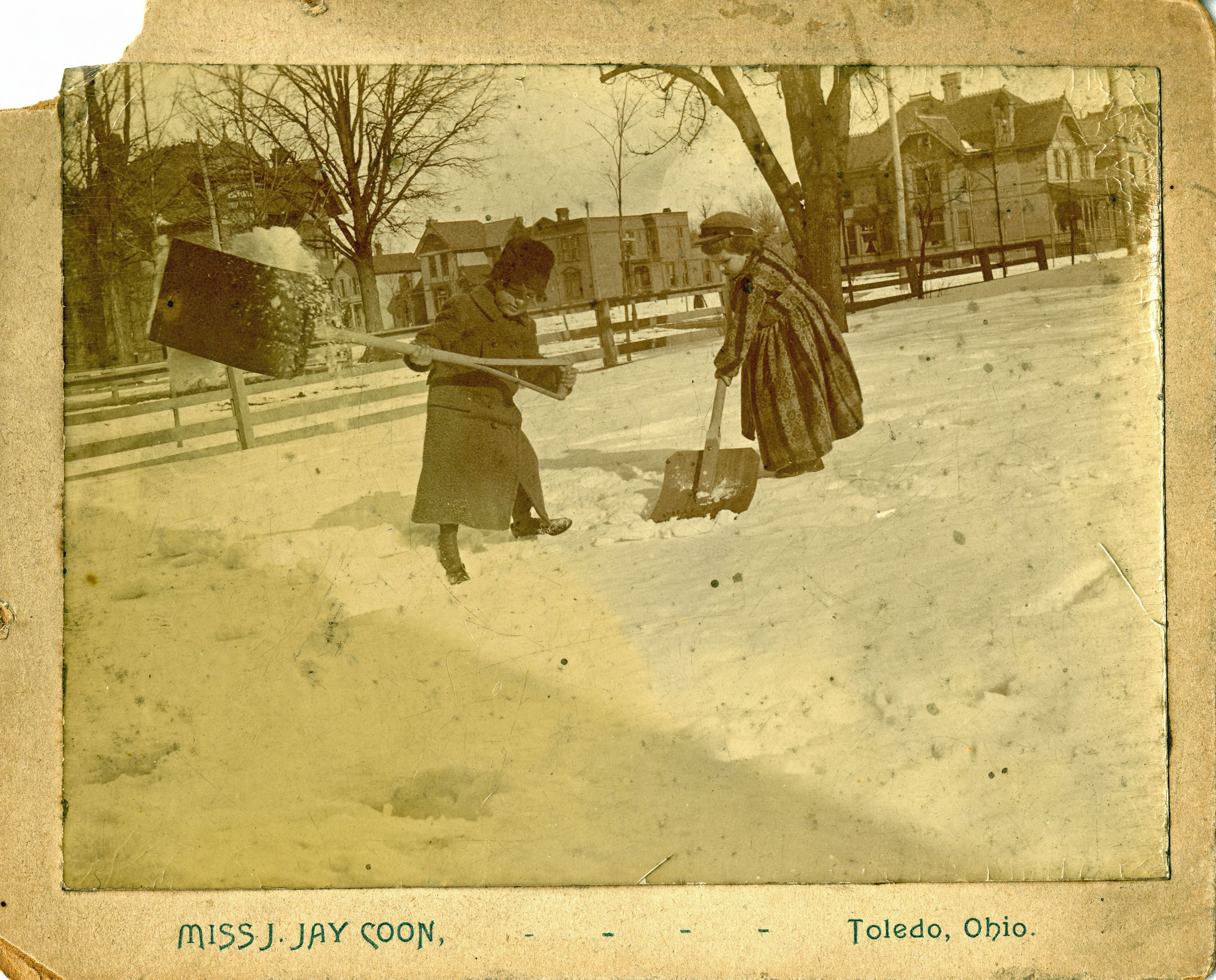
Two adolescent girls shoveling snow after a heavy snowfall (c. 1900)

The earliest known snow shovel was found in a bog in Russia. Estimated to be 6,000 years old, its blade was made from a carved elk antler section. According to archaeologists, the antler piece was tied to a wood or bone handle.

== Features ==
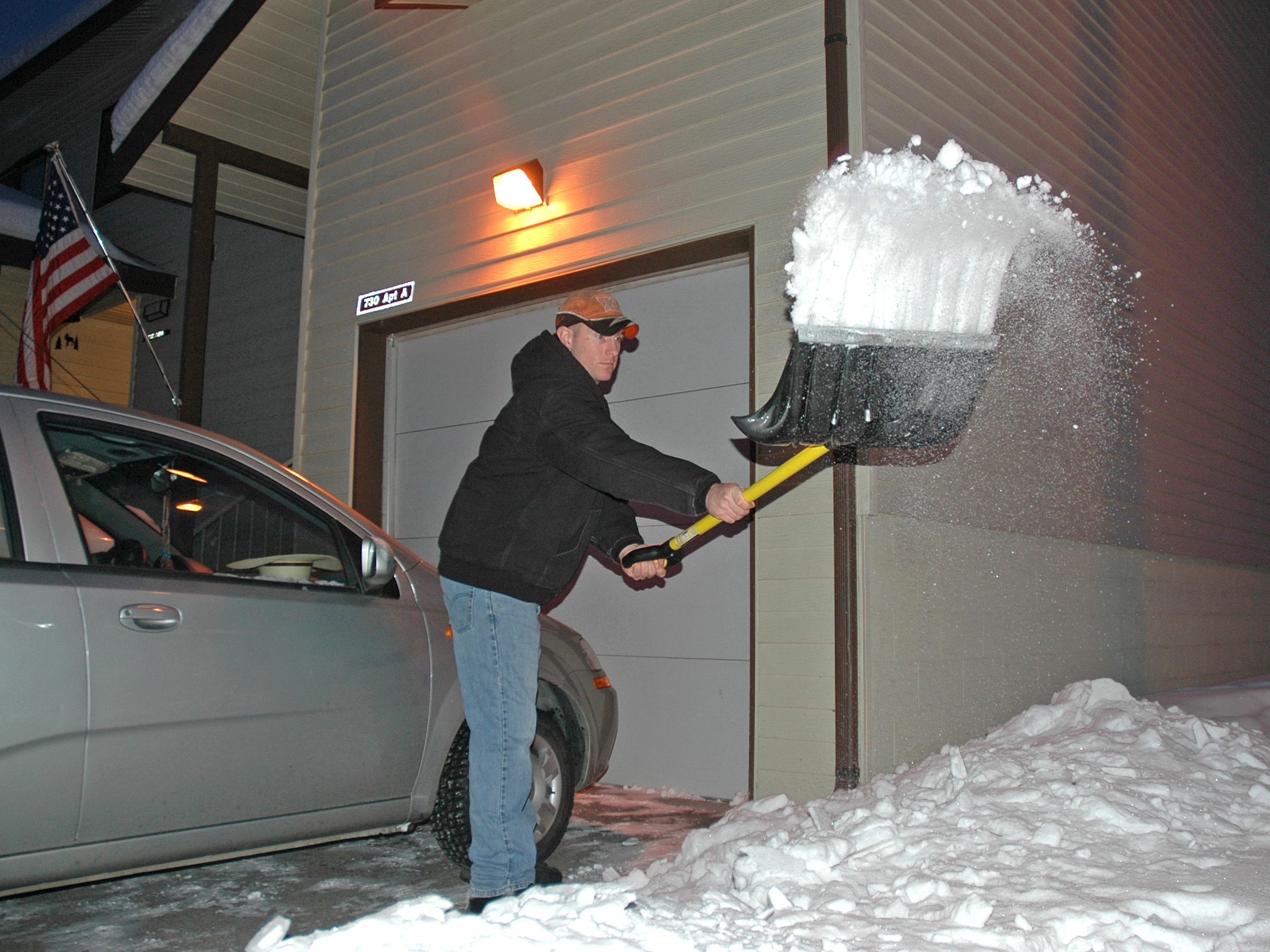
Throwing snow to clear a driveway

All snow shovels consist of a handle and a scoop. Sometimes there may be a shaft connecting handle and scoop, while in other snow shovels, the handle is extended and attaches directly to the scoop.

Most snow shovels are designed for either pushing snow or lifting snow, although some are crossovers which can do either job. Some snow shovel scoops have sharpened blades which can chip away and lever up slabs of ice.

Handles may be straight or bent. Straight handles make the pushing angle easier to adjust and snow throwing easier compared to a bent handle. Long handles enable the user to leverage their weight for pushing snow, but shorter handles make tossing snow easier. Plastic and fiberglass handles are lightweight, while wood handles are heavy. Metal handles conduct heat away from the hands more readily than other kinds of handles, so they feel colder.

Some handles include a D-shaped grip or padded grip at the end of the handle. There may also be extra grips in the middle of the handle to assist with the snow shovel's lever action when lifting snow.

Snow shovels designed for lifting snow generally have smaller scoops than snow shovels designed for throwing snow. A typical push-type shovel scoop would be about 24 inches across with a wide, blunt blade, while a lift-type shovel scoop may be half that size. A narrower scoop makes the removal of deep, wet, or heavy snow easier. Scoops with a large curve can carry more snow, while those with a shallow curve are intended to push snow rather than carry it. Metal scoops are sturdier than plastic but heavier, and they also require more maintenance. Steel and steel-edged scoops are heavier than aluminum or plastic, but are also more durable. Although they are very good for dealing with ice, they can also damage delicate outdoor home surfaces.

Snow shovel designs which let one push aside snow without lifting it are sometimes called snow sled shovels, or snow scoops and sleigh shovels. They are large and deep hopper-like implements fitted with a wide handle and designed to scoop up a load of snow and slide it to another location without lifting.

Many homeowners who deal with large amounts of snow have multiple snow shovels for different types of snow. If lifting is a concern, then they may choose separate shovels for lifting versus pushing. Otherwise, users may wish to have a shovel for fresh light snow and another one to manage icy hard snow.

An electric snow shovel is a compact and lightweight machine designed for clearing snow from walkways, driveways, and other small areas. It is a motorized alternative to manual shoveling, offering convenience and efficiency.

== Safe usage ==
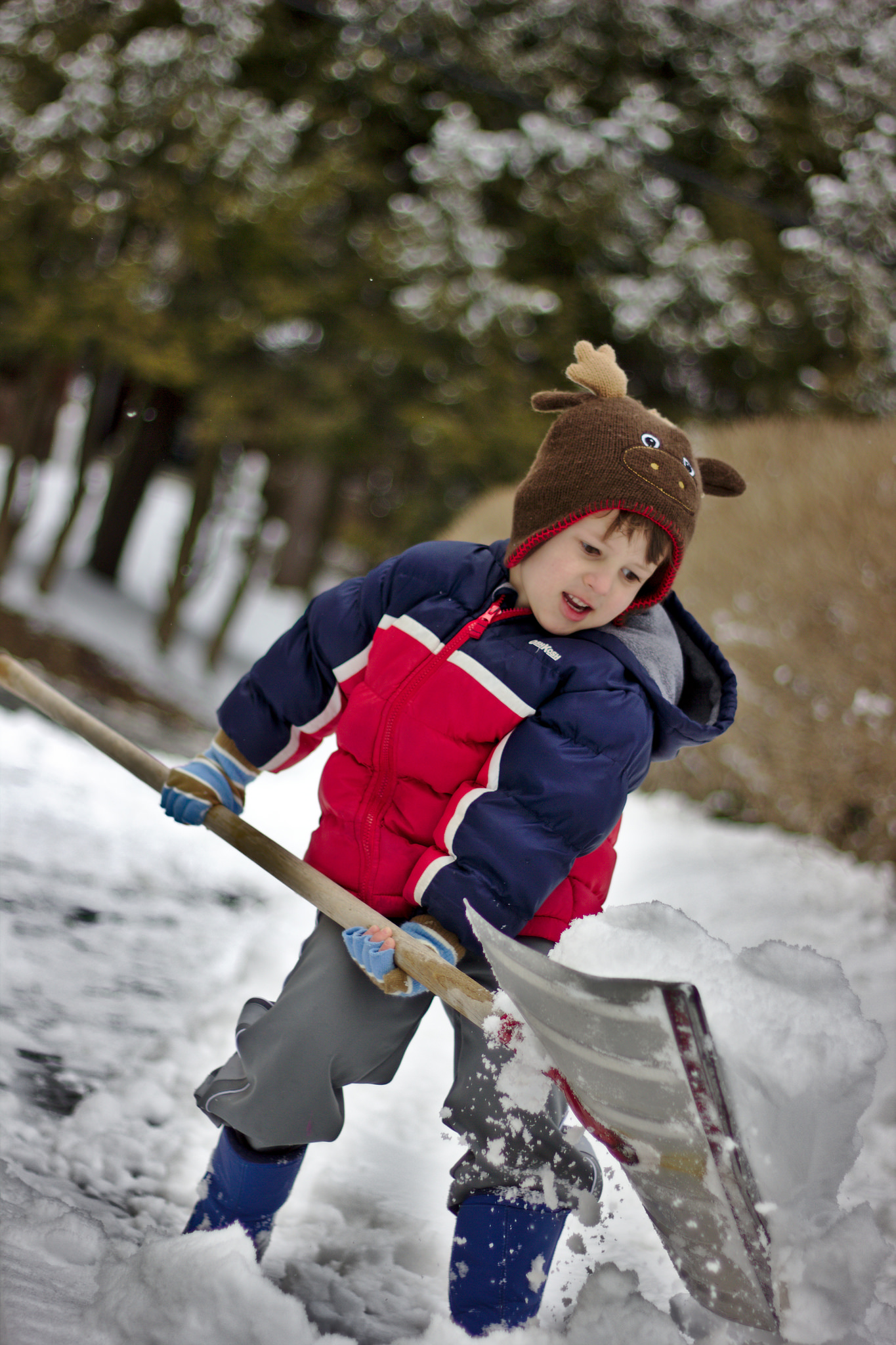
A child in appropriate clothing, moving a shovelful of fresh snow

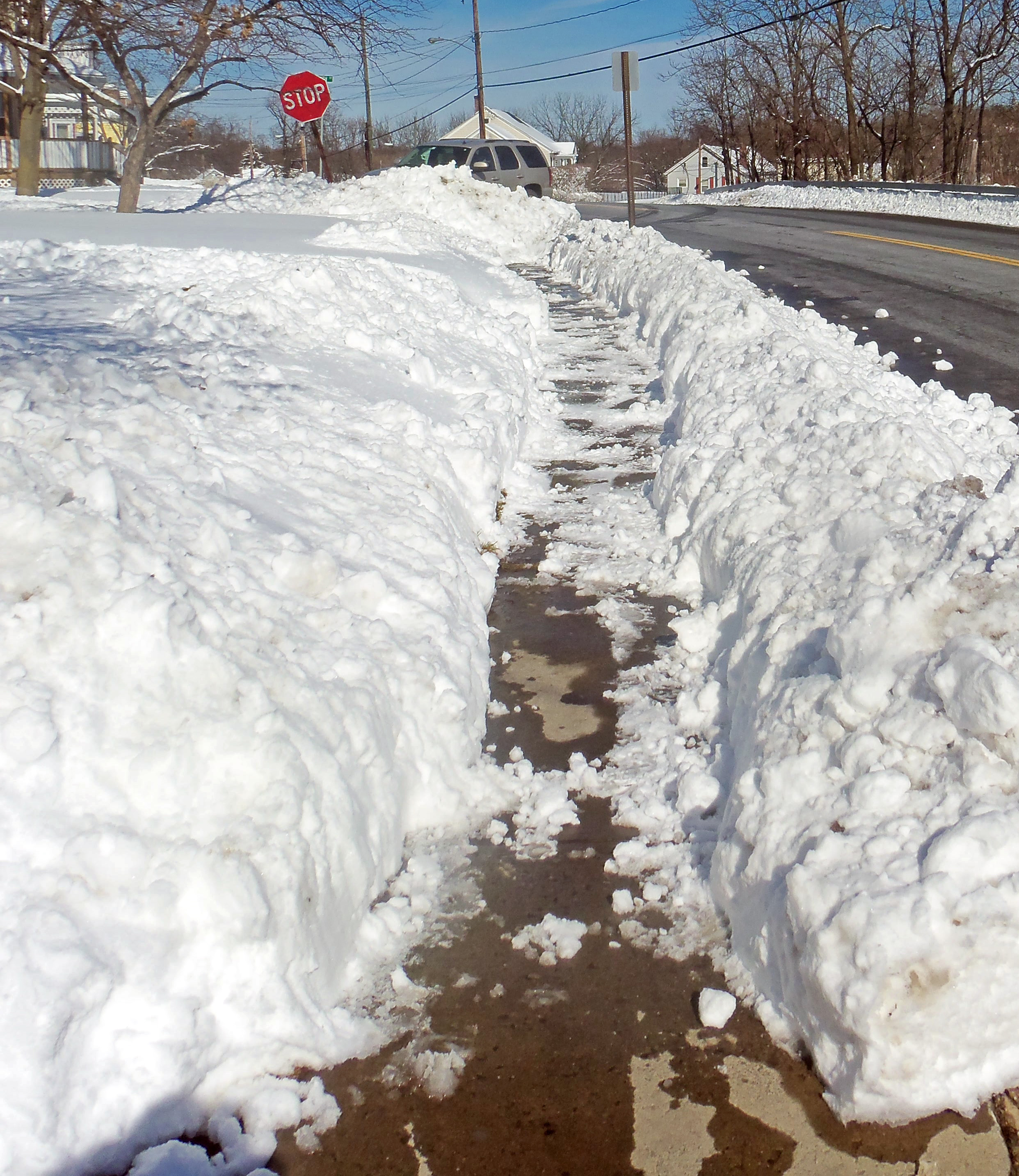
A sidewalk cleared with a shovel after a heavy snowstorm

Shoveling snow is hard work. In a single winter, shoveling a typical driveway can involve moving more than 25 tons of snow. Health risks associated with shoveling snow include heart attacks (myocardial infarction), worsening of existing breathing issues, sprains and strains, slips and falls, back injuries, hypothermia and frostbite, and accidents involving road traffic.

Persons doing snow shoveling can reduce their risk of injury by shoveling snow when it is fresh and light. Slip-resistant boots protect against user falls. Appropriate clothing prevents hypothermia and frostbite. Ideal snow shoveling clothing for the rest of the body is lightweight, layered, and water-repellent to increase ventilation while maintaining insulation.

Proper snow throwing technique minimizes strains and back injuries. Recommended technique is that when lifting snow, the user bends their knees to collect the snow while maintaining a straight upright back, then straightening the legs to stand and lift. It is best to lift snow by using the shovel as a lever. Never lift snow with a side-twisting motion, as that can lead to injury.

Shoveling snow is a known trigger for myocardial infarction among people at risk for heart problems and who do not regularly engage in strenuous physical activity. People who suffer from pre-existing heart or breathing problems should consult their doctor before shoveling snow.

Snow shoveling is overall safer for youth than older adults, especially among males. When done correctly, snow shoveling can provide good exercise. One hour of shoveling snow can burn 600 calories. Shoveling snow also builds bone and muscle mass and is a good form of aerobic exercise.

== In popular culture ==
In Advance of the Broken Arm, a 1915 readymade sculpture from Marcel Duchamp, consisted of a regular snow shovel with "from Marcel Duchamp 1915" painted on the handle. The original artwork which used to hang in Duchamp's studio is now lost, but an authorized replica is in the collection of the Yale University Art Gallery.
