= Snow farm =

Dump for excess snow

A snow farm is a large pile of snow that is formed after dumping large quantities of snow into one place. Its creation is preceded by a large snowfall, and is built when municipalities run out of room to store it, such as street corners or the sides of roads. They are often filled with debris and trash, which are picked up in an attempt to remove the snow. During the 2014-2015 winter in Boston, one snow farm had trash being removed well in July, as the melting snow revealed more debris.
