= Meltwater management =

Meltwater management is a runoff management system designed to deal with runoff caused by the melting of snow in colder climates. They were designed when it became apparent that using the Best management practice (BMP) for rainfall runoff was not working.

Snow filtration is a system to deal with left-over snow in an environmentally friendly way. Removing snow from roads is done to ensure road safety. The conventional method is by removing the snow and emptying it into rivers. However, since salt is used to melt ice on the roads, the salt also enters the rivers with the dumped snow. This increases the salt content of the rivers which can have impacts on aquatic and marine ecosystems. The practice of removing snow from streets and off-loading it into rivers affects the aquatic ecosystems.

== Method ==
In the spring as snow melts, the salt utilized on roads as a deicer are left behind. This can be environmentally damaging as it creates a hypertonic environment for plants.

The snow runoff is collected and brought to a collection center. It is directed through an oil and grit separator which also monitors the consistency of pollutants in the runoff. The oil and grit separator causes electrochemical and biological processes, which bind heavy metals and nutrients to the sediment by means of reduction-oxidation reactions. At the same time, this reduces the amount of chlorine present in the runoff.

The runoff then flows into a catch basin, where plants use the salt ions (e.g. K^{+}, P^{3−}, N^{3−}) for their growth. The runoff is further filtered by the plants, leaving only clean water to go back into streams and rivers.

== See also ==
- Berm
- Bioswale
- Climate change
- Flood control
