= Snowmass =

Snowmass may refer to:

- Snowmass Village, Colorado, a town in Pitkin County, Colorado, U.S.
  - Snowmass (ski area)
  - Snowmastodon site, an archaeological excavation near the town where well-preserved fossils of mammoths, mastodons, and plants were found in an ancient lakebed (subject of a 2012 Nova documentary)
- Snowmass, Colorado, an unincorporated town in Pitkin County, Colorado, U.S.
- Snowmass Creek, a creek in Pitkin County, Colorado, U.S.
- Snowmass Mountain, a mountain in the Elk Mountains in Colorado, U.S.
- Snowmass Process, the name of the Particle Physics Community Planning Exercise organized by the Division of Particles and Fields (DPF) of the American Physical Society about once per decade.

== See also ==
- Aspen/Snowmass, a ski resort complex
