= REMP =

REMP, or Renewable Energy Mitigation Program, is a model of promoting renewable energy through local government building codes that was launched in Colorado in 2000.

== Overview ==
REMP is a system that encourages the installation of renewable energy systems in partnership with local government agencies. It was launched in the City of Aspen and Pitkin County in 2000, the first of its kind in the world. Under a REMP program, homeowners who build very energy-consumptive houses, add on to their existing house to render it very energy-consumptive, or install exterior energy use systems must mitigate their energy use. Proper mitigation methods include installing home renewable energy systems to produce their own power or pay into a fund that is later distributed to fund other energy-efficiency projects.

== Basics ==
REMP programs operate under municipalities and counties that have adopted an efficient building code. Included in the code is a section mandating that new buildings—or additions onto existing buildings—must meet certain efficiency requirements. If buildings do not meet that code, they must then mitigate their energy use. Options for mitigation are to install on-site renewable energy systems, such as photovoltaics, solar hot water, a geothermal heat pump, microhydro, or small scale wind power, or to pay into a REMP fund. An appointed nonprofit or other organization stewards the REMP fund and applies it to financing other local energy efficiency projects.

== Commercial REMP ==
As of January 2010, Aspen and Pitkin County's REMP program now applies to new commercial developments as well as residential construction.

== History ==
=== Aspen, Colorado ===
The first REMP program was established in 2000 by the City of Aspen and Pitkin County, Colorado, U.S.A. In January 2000, the Pitkin County Commissioners and Aspen City Council approved the REMP. The program assesses fees on new homes that exceed the energy budget established by the Aspen/Pitkin Energy Code. REMP fees are collected by the Community Development Department when building permits are issued. The money is held by the City of Aspen's Finance Department until the Board of County Commissioners and City Council approve a REMP spending proposal. These proposals are developed by the Community Office of Resource Efficiency (CORE), a local nonprofit organization. CORE's board of directors includes representatives from throughout the county, from the local utilities, and the local transportation authority. As of 2009, Aspen/Pitkin REMP and CORE have generated over six million dollars to distribute through energy-efficiency grants and rebates.

Generally, in Aspen, houses that exceed 5,000 square feet (460 m^{2}) must pay $5,000 or install on-site renewables, and houses over 10,000 square feet (930 m^{2}) must pay $10,000 or install on-site renewables.

Also, in Aspen, outdoor energy consuming devices are very common. The majority of REMP funding comes from heated snowmelt driveways.

=== Replications ===
The REMP model is very replicable and has been applied to a number of locales: Snowmass Village, Basalt, Colorado, Carbondale, Colorado, Eagle County, Colorado, and Martha's Vineyard.

==== Martha's Vineyard ====
Martha's Vineyard enacted their own energy-efficient building code, VineyardBuild, modeled after Aspen's and Carbondale's.

==== Eagle County, Colorado ====
Eagle County's new energy-efficient building code, ECOBuild is another points-based code checklist, requiring homeowners to build within a certain energy budget.
