= Snowmass Lake =

Lake west of Aspen, Colorado

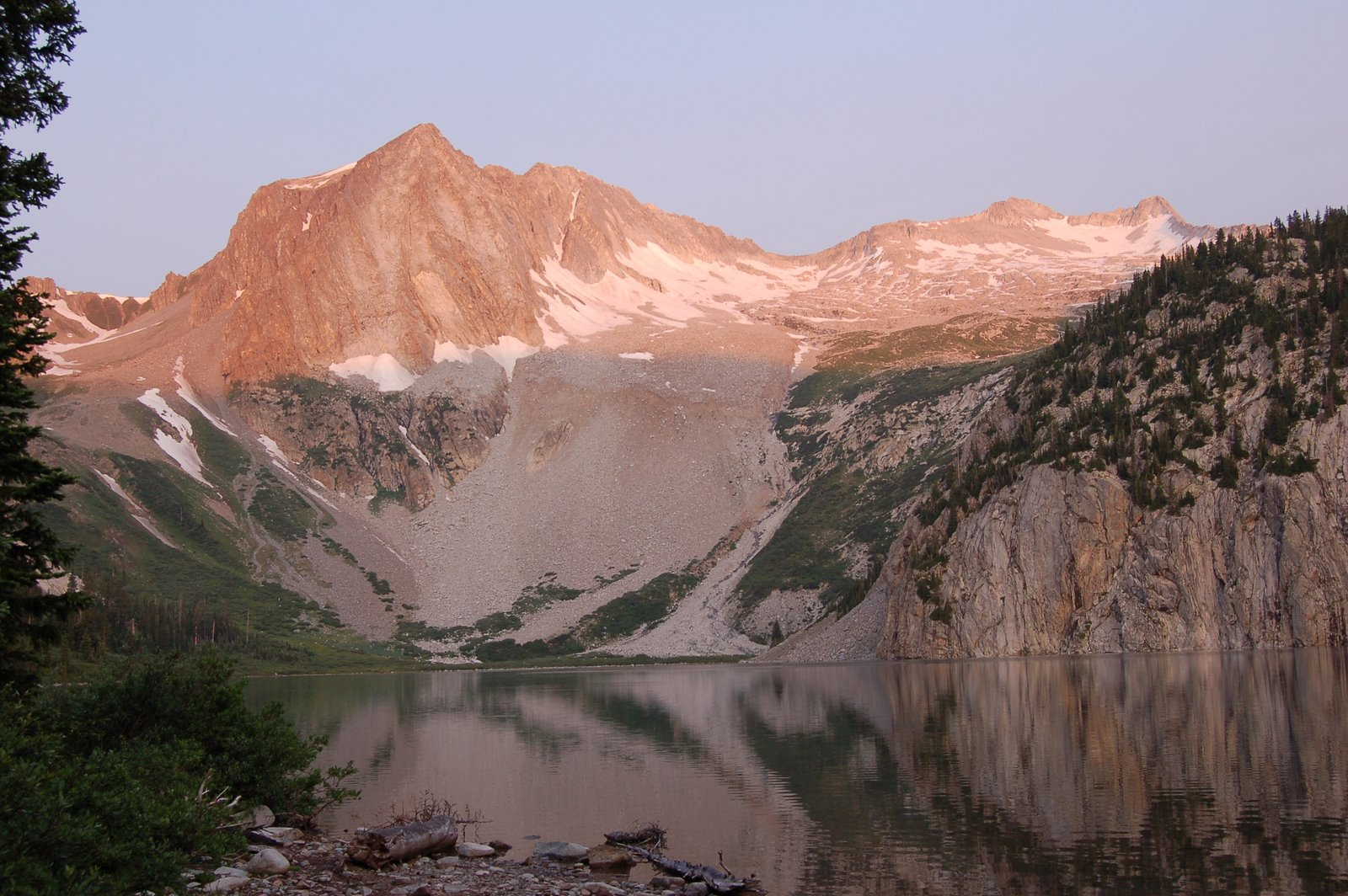
- Hagerman Peak and Snowmass Mountain both stand over Snowmass Lake

- Snowmass Lake Snowmass Lake (the United States)
- Location: Maroon Bells-Snowmass Wilderness
- Coordinates: 39°7′2″N 107°1′59″W,
- Primary outflows: Roaring Fork River
- Ocean/sea sources: Rocky Mountains
- Basin countries: United States
- Surface elevation: 10,980 feet (3,350 m)

Snowmass Lake is in the Maroon Bells-Snowmass Wilderness of the White River National Forest west of Aspen, Colorado.

It is popular, scenic alpine lake. The lake is at 10,980 feet (3,350 m) feet of elevation in Pitkin County, and the only access is by a challenging hiking trail. Fishing is permitted, and while the water is cold, swimming is permitted. To bring your dog is fine, but it must be leashed. It is drained by Snowmass Creek.

Many animal species live in the area, including black bear, deer, marmot, and moose, and visitors should expect to encounter wildlife, Respect that you are in the home of that wildlife.

It is near Hagerman Peak, Snowmass Peak, Capitol Peak, and Clark Peak. It is also close to Buckskin Pass and Maroon Peak and North Maroon Peak.

== External links and references ==
- On the trail to Snowmass Lake
- On the hike, Snowmass Lake via Maroon-Snowmass Trail
- On the hike, Snowmass Lake (10,980 ft)
