= Snowmelt =

Surface runoff produced from melting snow

Timelapse of Snowmelt over Okanagan Lake in British Columbia

In hydrology, snowmelt is surface runoff produced from melting snow. It can also be used to describe the period or season during which such runoff is produced. Water produced by snowmelt is an important part of the annual water cycle in many parts of the world, in some cases contributing high fractions of the annual runoff in a watershed. Predicting snowmelt runoff from a drainage basin may be a part of designing water control projects. Rapid snowmelt can cause flooding. If the snowmelt is then frozen, very dangerous conditions and accidents can occur, introducing the need for salt to melt the ice.

== Energy fluxes ==
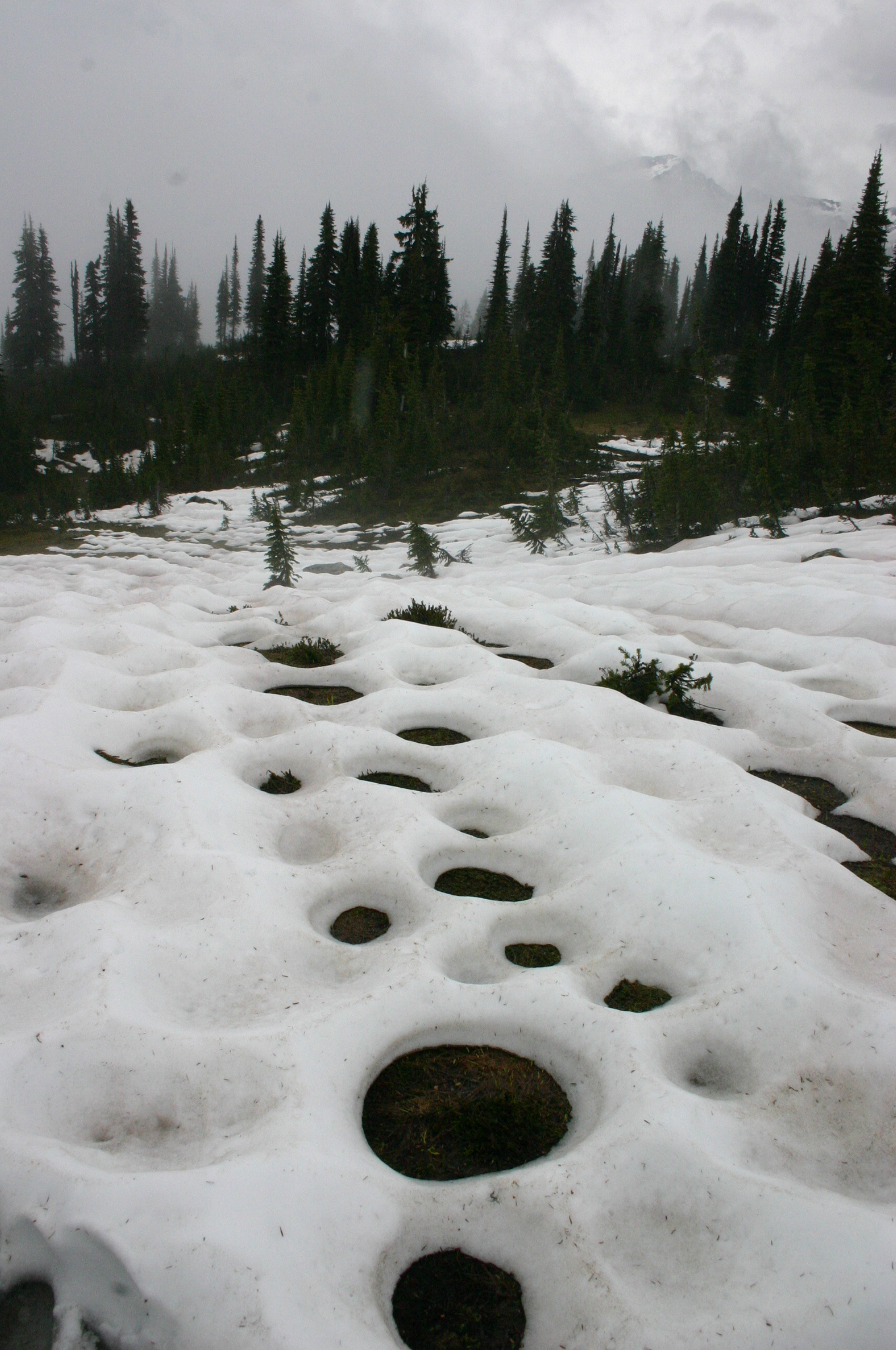
Vegetation gives off heat, resulting in this circular snowmelt pattern.

There are several energy fluxes involved in the melting of snow. These fluxes can act in opposing directions, that is either delivering heat to or removing heat from the snowpack. Ground heat flux is the energy delivered to the snowpack from the soil below by conduction. Radiation inputs to the snowpack include net shortwave (solar radiation including visible and ultraviolet light) and longwave (infrared) radiation. Net shortwave radiation is the difference in energy received from the sun and that reflected by the snowpack because of the snowpack albedo. Longwave radiation is received by the snowpack from many sources, including ozone, carbon dioxide, and water vapor present in all levels of the atmosphere. Longwave radiation is also emitted by the snowpack in the form near–black-body radiation, where snow has an emissivity between 0.97 and 1.0. Generally the net longwave radiation term is negative, meaning a net loss of energy from the snowpack. Latent temperature flux is the energy removed from or delivered to the snowpack which accompanies the mass transfers of evaporation, sublimation, or condensation. Sensible heat flux is the heat flux due to convection between the air and snowpack.

== Thaw circles around tree trunks ==
Tree trunks absorbing sunlight become warmer than the air and cause earlier melting of snow around them. The snow does not melt slower gradually with distance from the trunk, but rather creates a wall surrounding snow-free ground around it. According to some of sources, North American spring ephemeral plants like spring beauty (Claytonia caroliniana), trout lily (Erythronium americanum) and red trillium (Trillium erectum L.) benefit from such thaw circles. They can emerge earlier inside these circles, what gives them more time before development of tree canopy foliage cutting off significant portion of the light. They perform nearly all of their yearly photosynthesis during this period.

Evergreen trees tend to produce larger thaw circles than deciduous trees. This involves largely a different mechanism and spring ephemeral plants don't occur there.

The snow melts earlier in forest also for example on microtopographic mounds (small elevations) or in wet places like edges of creeks or in seeps. These microsites affect distribution of many herbs too.

== Timing ==
The timing of snowmelt in mountainous regions has advanced with climate change.

As of 2002, in northern Alaska, the melt-date had advanced by 8 days since the mid-1960s. Decreased snowfall in winter followed by warmer spring conditions seems to be the cause for the advance. In Europe, the 2012 heat wave has especially been anomalous at higher altitudes. For the first time on record, some of the highest Alpine peaks in Europe were snow-free. Although it would seem that the two were related, the question of how much of this was due to climate change remained a center of debate.

== Historical cases ==
Snowmelt flowing into lake at Okanagan Mountain Provincial Park

Increased water runoff due to snowmelt was a cause of many famous floods. One well-known example is the Red River Flood of 1997, when the Red River of the North in the Red River Valley of the United States and Canada flooded. Flooding in the Red River Valley is augmented by the fact that the river flows north through Winnipeg, Manitoba and into Lake Winnipeg. As snow in Minnesota, North Dakota, and South Dakota begins to melt and flow into the Red River, the presence of downstream ice can act as a dam and force upstream water to rise. Colder temperatures downstream can also potentially lead to freezing of water as it flows north, thus augmenting the ice dam problem. Some areas in British Columbia are also prone to snowmelt flooding as well.

== Scholarly conversation ==
The date of annual melt is of great interest as a potential indicator of climate change. In order to determine whether the earlier disappearance of spring snow cover in northern Alaska is related to global warming versus an appearance of a more natural, continual cycle of the climate, further study and monitoring is necessary.

Large year-to-year variability complicates the picture and furthers the debate. Inter-annual variability of springtime snow pack comes largely from variability of winter month precipitation which is in turn related to the variability of key patterns of atmospheric circulation.

A study of the mountains in the western United States show a region wide decline in spring snow-pack since the mid-1900s, dominated by loss at low elevations where winter temperatures are near freezing. These losses are an indication of increased temperatures which lead to snow loss via some combination of increased regularity of rain versus snow and increased melting during winter months. These natural variations make it challenging to quantify trends with confidence, to deduce observed changes to predict future climate, or to clearly detect changes in snow-pack due to human impact on warming trends.

== See also ==
- Albedo
- Avalanche
- Freshet
- Ice melt
- Snowmelt system
- Snowpack

== Gallery ==
Dust accelerates snow melt in the San Juan Mountains

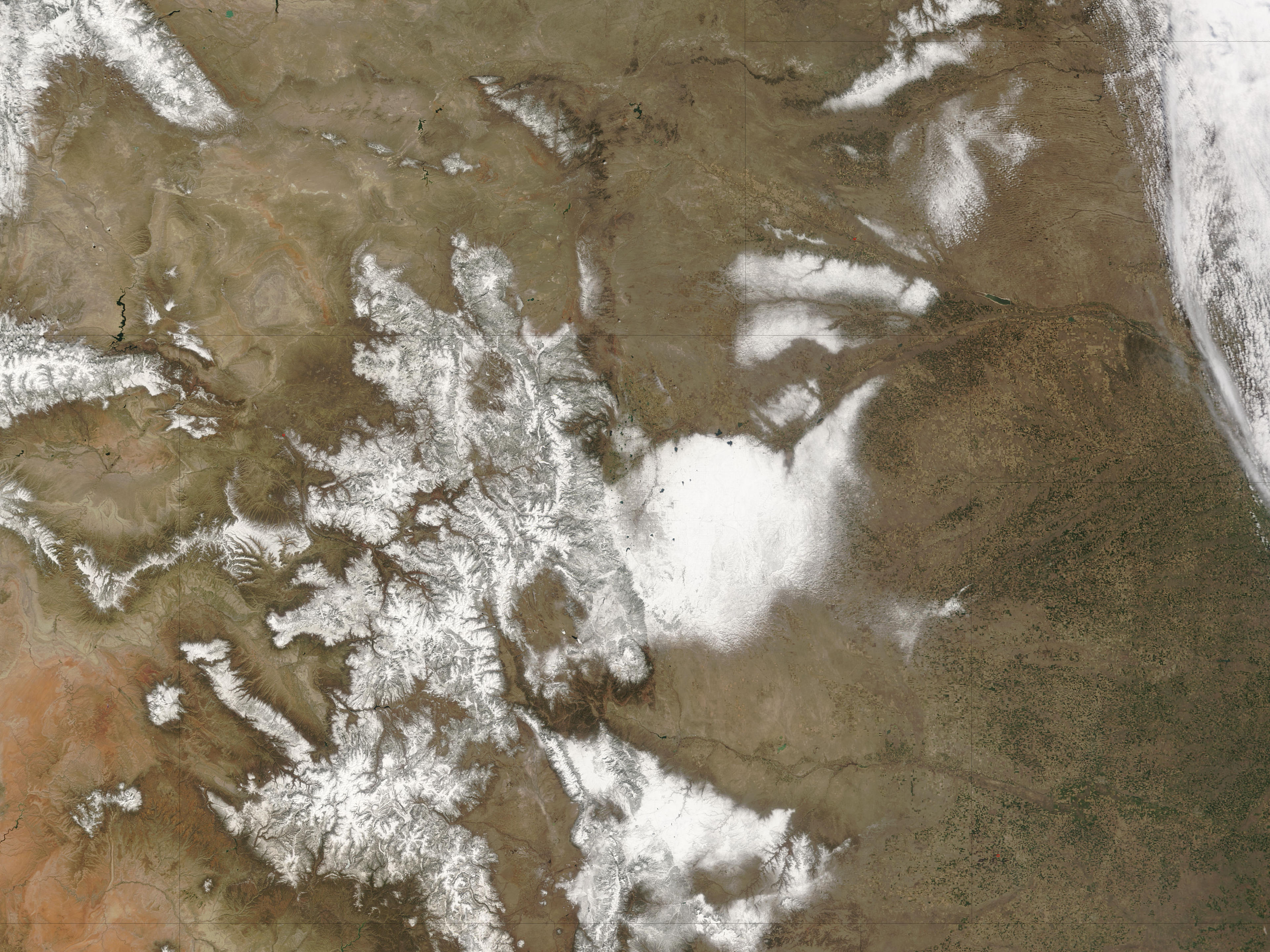
2005 (Less dust)

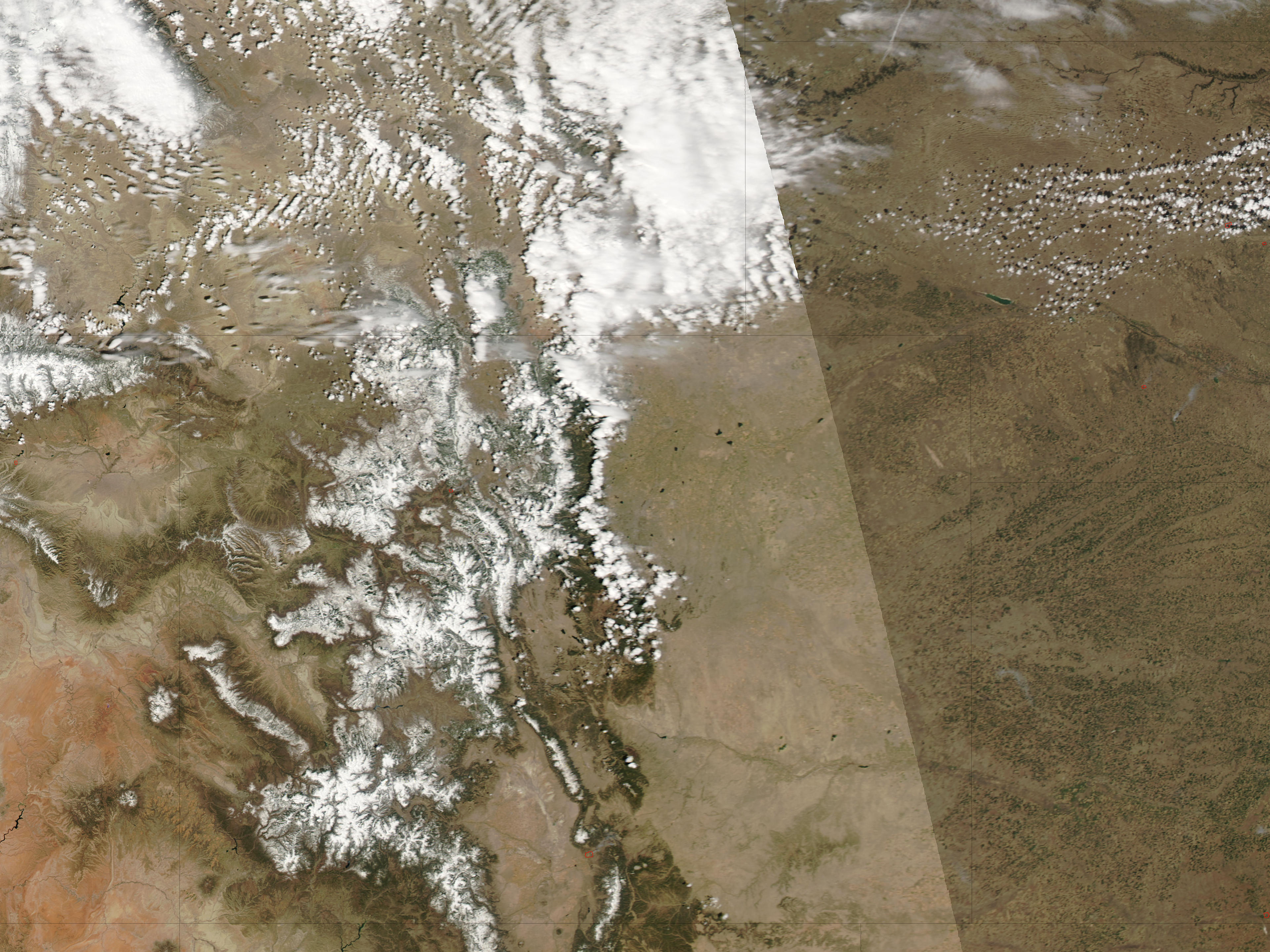
2006 (More dust)

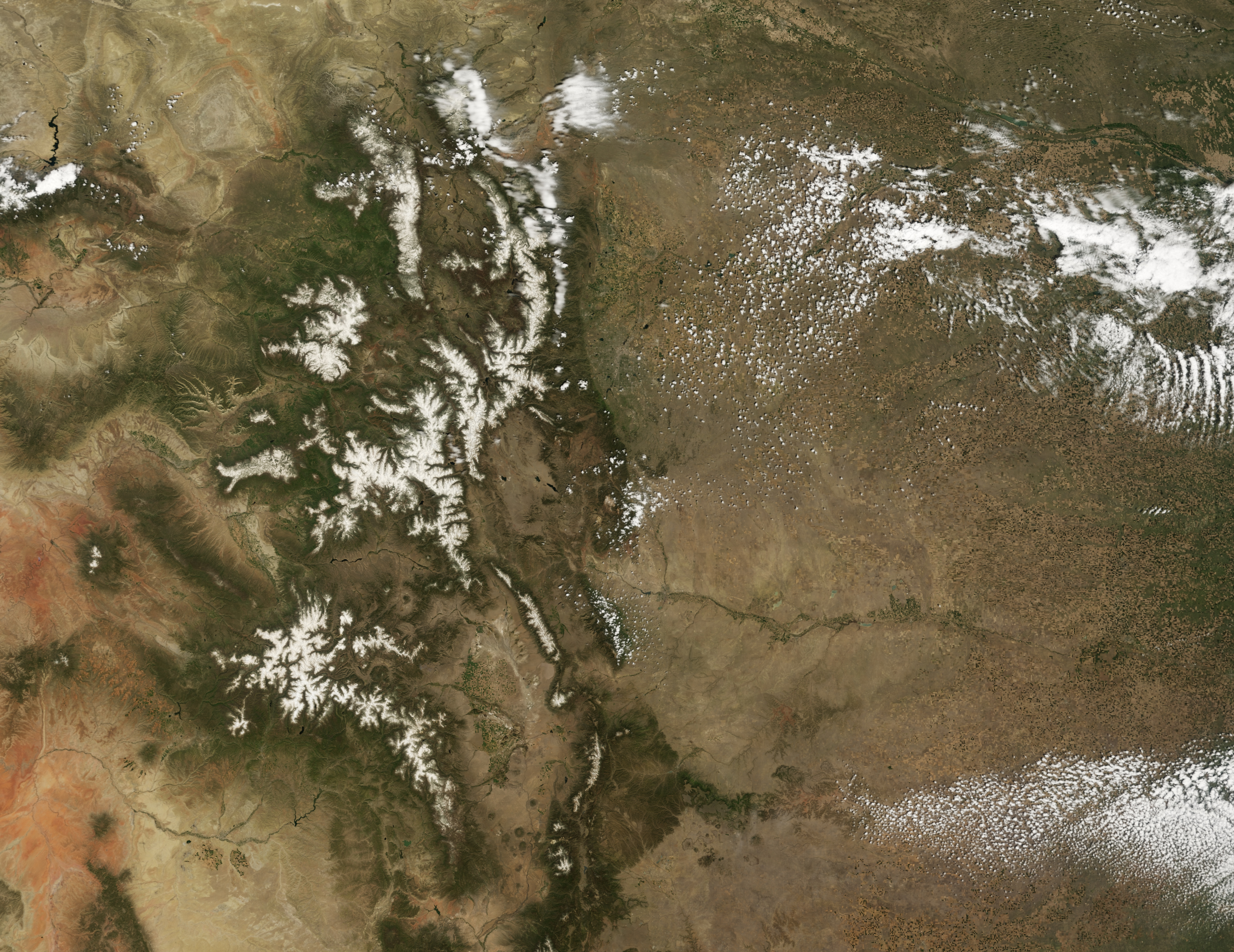
2008 (Less dust)

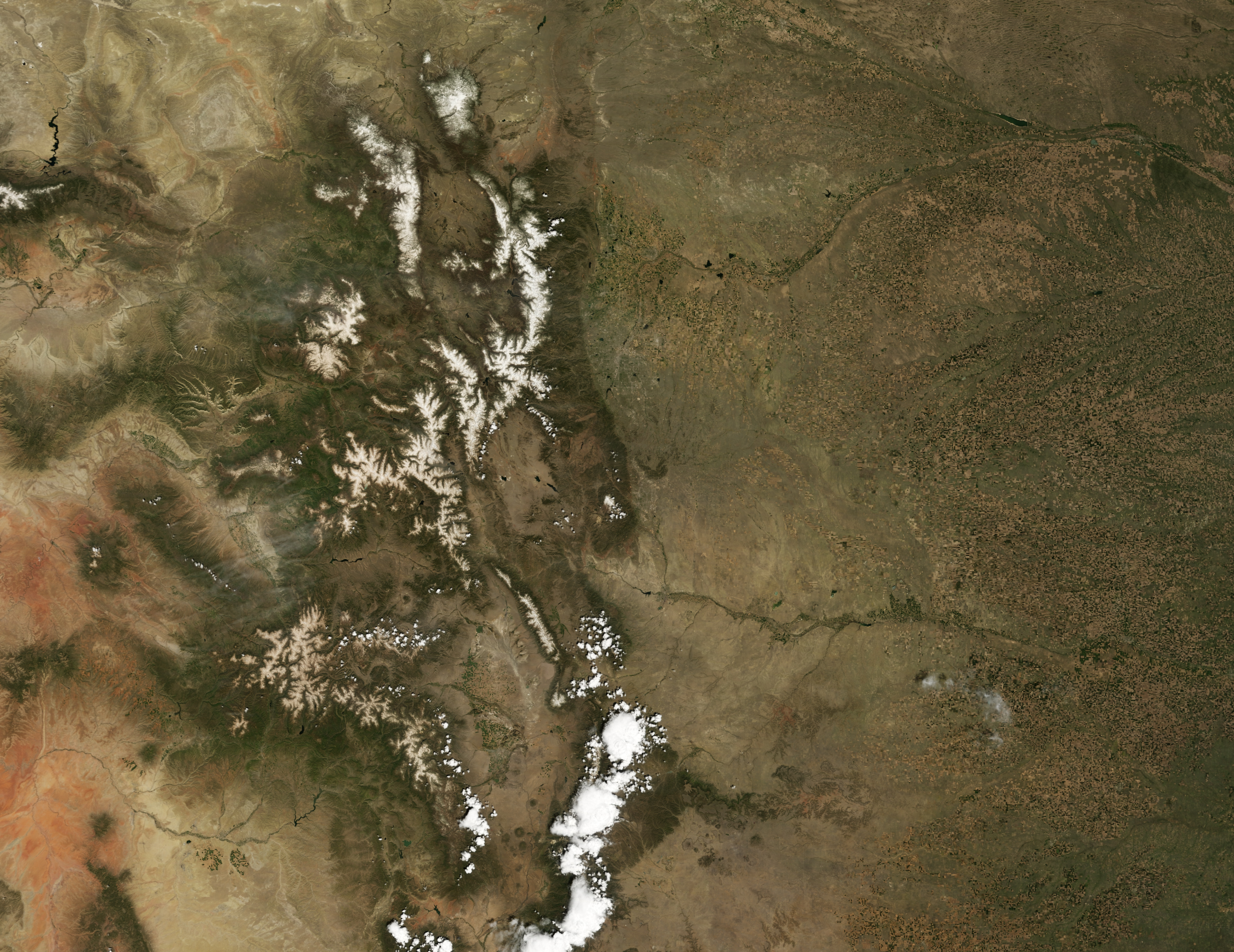
2009 (More dust)
