= Roman Abramovich Wildcat Ridge house =

Mansion near Snowmass Village, Colorado

Coordinates: 39.2167°N 106.9628°W

The Roman Abramovich Wildcat Ridge house is a 14,300-square-foot (1,330 m^{2}) mansion at Wildcat Ridge near Snowmass Village, Colorado. The 11-bedroom, 12-bath mansion, and 200 acres (81 ha) of land it stands on, called a "ranch" by The Wall Street Journal, have an estimated worth of $50 million as of 2022, and was owned by Roman Abramovich. He bought the property for $36.375 million in 2008, at the time the third most expensive residential real estate transaction in Pitkin County, Colorado.

Built in 2004, the architect was Bart Voorsanger, who also designed the Asia Society Museum in Manhattan.

Media reported that the property could be subject to sanctions by the United States government during the 2022 Russian invasion of Ukraine. County commissioner Greg Poschman asked Colorado Deputy Attorney General Kurtis Morrison to investigate why sanctions to date did not target the property, stating to media his question was "if there was illegal activity and the [United States government] overlooked it for some reason".
