= Shosetsu =

Shosetsu can refer to:

- Snowmelt system § Geothermal systems, used in Japan
- Xiaoxue, the 20th solar term in the 24-term Chinese lunisolar calendar
