= Snowmass Peak =

Mountain in Colorado, United States

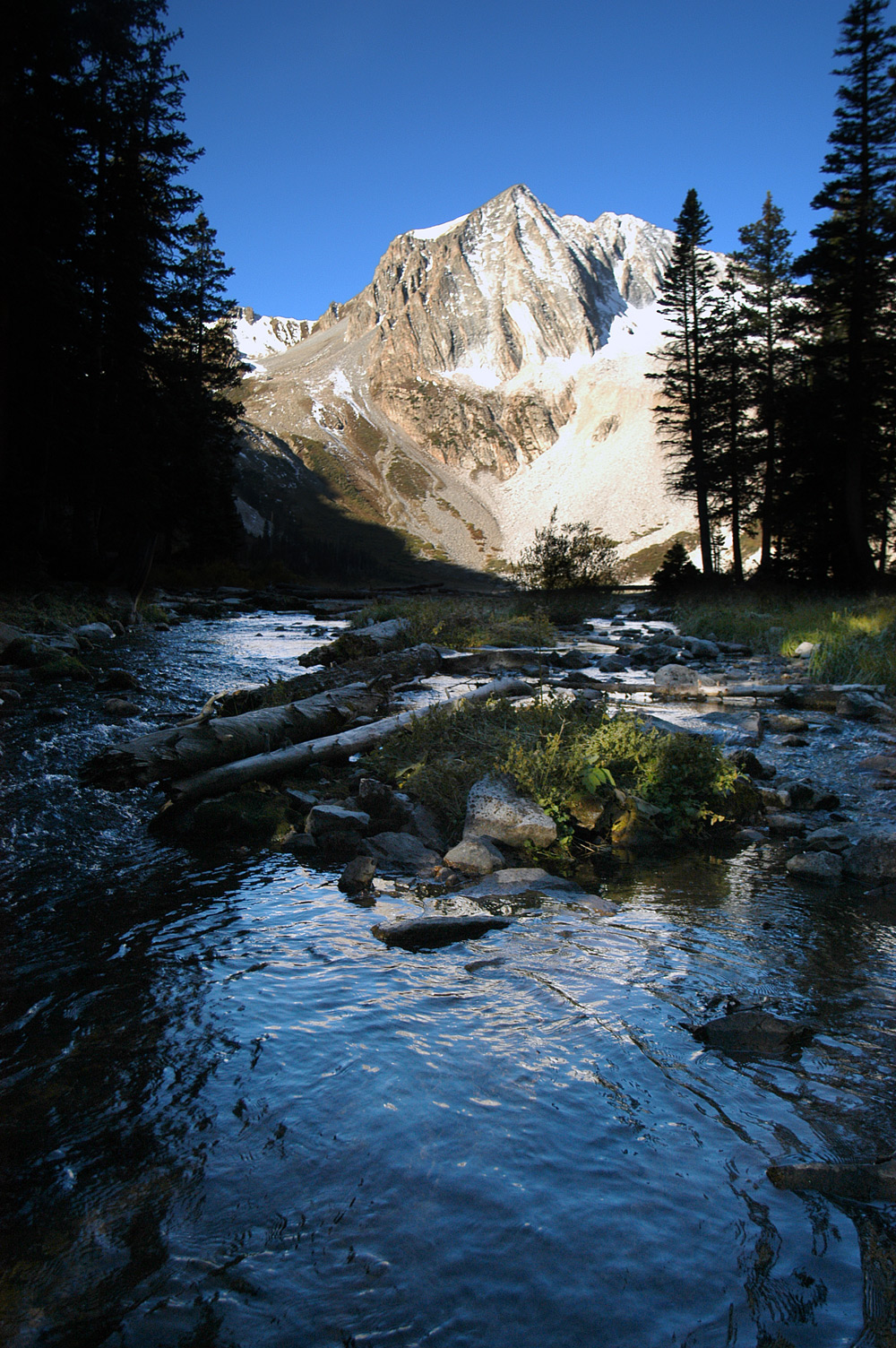
- Snowmass Peak rises up out of Snowmass Lake

Highest point
- Elevation: 13,620 ft (4,150 m)
- Prominence: 120 ft (37 m)
- Parent peak: Hagerman Peak
- Isolation: 0.24 mi (0.39 km)
- Coordinates: 39°06′39″N 107°03′08″W

Geography
- Location within Colorado
- Location: Gunnison and Pitkin counties, Colorado, United States
- Parent range: Elk Mountains
- Topo map(s): USGS 7.5' topographic map Snowmass Mountain, Colorado

Snowmass Peak in the U.S. state of Colorado dominates the view from Snowmass Lake. It is often mistaken for Snowmass Mountain, the thirty-fourth highest mountain peak in the state, as well as for Hagerman Peak. Snowmass Peak is not really a peak but the lower end of Hagerman Peak's east ridge. Natural forced perspective causes the optical illusion that Snowmass Peak is higher than Hagerman Peak though it is actually 221 ft shorter than Hagerman's summit. This illusion combined with its striking rise behind Snowmass Lake justifies it being a named point on USGS topographical maps. It is located in the Elk Mountains, within the Maroon Bells-Snowmass Wilderness of the White River National Forest. It lies along the border between Pitkin and Gunnison counties, west of Aspen and southwest of the town of Snowmass Village.

== Hiking/climbing ==
The route used to climb Snowmass Peak is the Trail Rider Pass trail to Hagerman Peak. This trail can be accessed by Snowmass Creek approach off Divide Road Snowmass Village or the Geneva Lake trail. It is possible to reach the summit between Hagerman Peak and Snowmass Mountain, but is much more difficult.

== See also ==
- False peak
- List of Colorado mountain ranges
- List of Colorado mountain summits
  - List of Colorado fourteeners
  - List of Colorado 4000 meter prominent summits
  - List of the most prominent summits of Colorado
- List of Colorado county high points
