= Toronto Transportation Services =

Division overview
- Formed: 1998
- Preceding Division: Metro Toronto Roads and Transportation
- Type: Division
- Jurisdiction: City of Toronto
- Employees: 1200
- Annual budget: $436.4 million CAD (2022)
- Division executive: Ashley Curtis, Acting General Manager
- Website: City of Toronto webpage

Toronto Transportation Services is the division of the City of Toronto which manages transport infrastructure within public rights of way in Toronto. With an operating budget of approximately $436.4 million in 2022 and 1,400 staff, the division maintains the city's surface streets and sidewalks, cycling infrastructure, the Gardiner Expressway and the Don Valley Parkway.

== History ==
The department was created in the 1998 amalgamation of Toronto from the merger of:

- Metropolitan Toronto Transportation Department (Metro Toronto Roads and Transportation)
- North York Transportation Department
- Scarborough Works Department
- Etobicoke Transportation Department
- City of York Transportation Department
- East York Transportation Department
- City of Toronto Department of Public Works and the Environment

Before amalgamation, Metro Toronto Transportation was responsible for major roads across Metro, while the municipalities were responsible for collector and local roads in their respective areas.

== Responsibilities and operations ==
Transportation Services is responsible for planning, construction, and management of the transportation infrastructure within the public right-of-way, including the public realm, sidewalks and roads. This includes:

- maintenance of around 10,000 different streets totaling 5,397 kilometers
- over 2,400 traffic signals
- 7,100 km of sidewalks
- 530 bridges
- over one million signs
- 4,100 bus shelters

=== Snow removal ===
The division is responsible for snow removal on public roads, sidewalks and other public areas:

- Total kilometers of ploughed sidewalks: 6,000
- Total number of opened driveways: 262,000

A variety of city and contract staff/equipment are used for snow removal:

- 592 snowplows/graders
- 5 Metromelt melting machines
- PD-350 snow melting trailer units
- 296 sidewalk ploughs
- 211 salt trucks
- City staff: 536
- Contracted staff: 1,068

Average snowfall in the city is 130 cm per year with 40 to 50 days of de-icing events per year.

An average of 146,275 tons of salt is used each year (based on a ten-year average). The city's snow removal budget is over $60 million a year.

Transportation Services is also responsible for a wide variety of activities including:

- Road and sidewalk maintenance
- Street cleaning
- Permits for on-street parking, construction and street events
- Traffic signs and pavement markings
- Traffic signals and traffic safety
- Red light camera operations
- Construction planning and policies

=== Traffic Management Centre ===
The Traffic Management Centre consists of the Traffic Safety, Traffic Plant Installations and Maintenance, and Urban Traffic Control Systems units. These units are responsible for:

- Red light cameras
- Central traffic signal systems
- Priority for Toronto Transit Commission and emergency vehicles (Toronto Fire Services, Toronto Paramedic Services, Toronto Police Service)
- Traffic Safety Unit providing traffic data and collision analysis
- Deployment of intelligent transportation systems to manage congestion
- Road Emergency Services Communications Unit expansion
- Pedestrian crossing signals

=== Sections ===
Transportation Services is divided into seven sections:

- Policy & Innovation
- Planning & Capital Programs
- Project Design & Management
- Business Performance
- Operations & Maintenance
- Traffic Management
- Permits & Enforcement
