= Snowmass, Colorado =

Unincorporated community in Pitkin County, CO, USA

Snowmass, Colorado Old Snowmass
- Unincorporated community
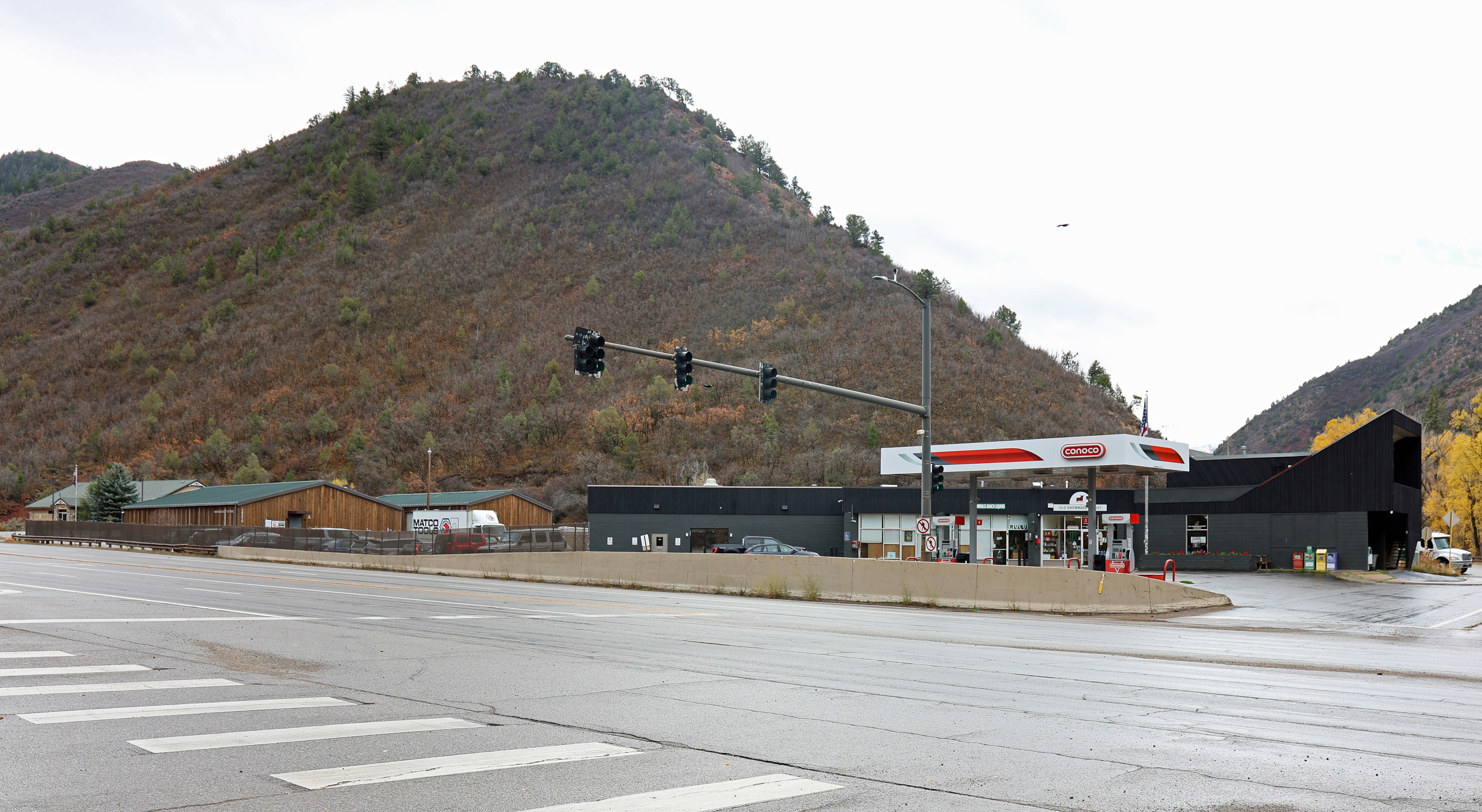
- Snowmass in 2025

- Location in Pitkin County and the state of Colorado Snowmass, Colorado (the United States)
- Coordinates: 39°12′47″N 106°56′16″W
- Country: United States
- State: Colorado
- County: Pitkin County
- Elevation: 8,399 ft (2,560 m)
- Time zone: UTC−07:00 (MST)
  - Summer (DST): UTC−06:00 (MDT)
- ZIP Code: 81654
- GNIS feature ID: 204832

Snowmass (sometimes known locally as Old Snowmass) is an unincorporated community and a U.S. Post Office located in Pitkin County, Colorado, United States. It is situated in the valley of the Roaring Fork River, near the mouth of Snowmass Creek along State Highway 82 between Aspen and Basalt. It consists largely of a post office, several commercial businesses, and surrounding houses and ranches. The Snowmass Post Office has the ZIP Code 81654.

Snowmass should not be confused with the Snowmass Ski Area or with the Town of Snowmass Village, the location of the ski area.

== History ==
Kenneth Lay, the former CEO of Enron, died while vacationing in Snowmass on July 5, 2006.

== Economy ==
The former St. Benedict's Monastery, of the Order of Cistercians of the Strict Observance (Trappist), now privately owned, was located in Snowmass.

== See also ==
- Pitkin County, Colorado
- Protected areas of Colorado
