= Mount Daly (Pitkin County, Colorado) =

Mountain in the state of Colorado

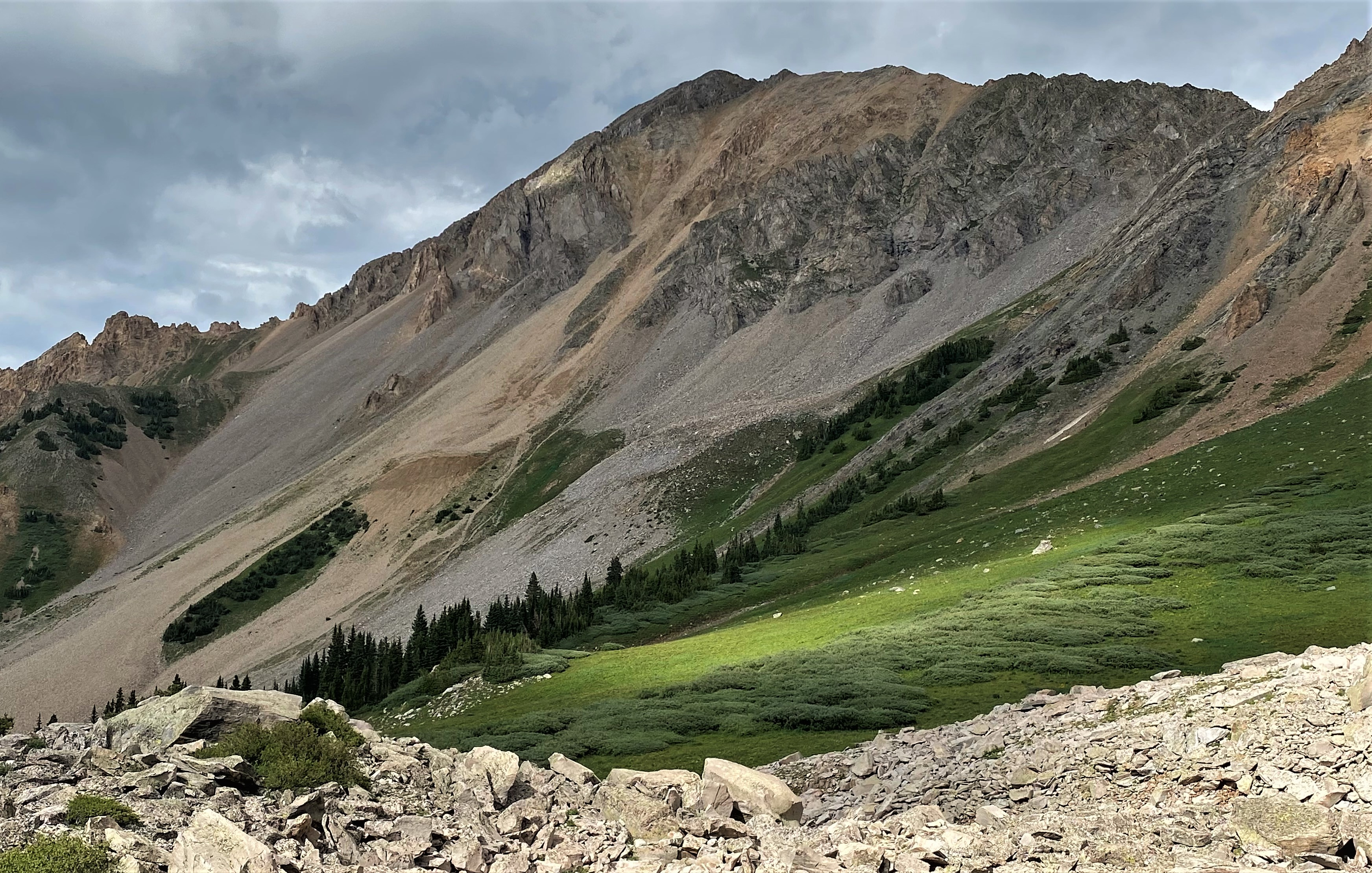
- Southwest aspect

Highest point
- Elevation: 13,323 ft (4,061 m)
- Prominence: 820 ft (250 m)
- Parent peak: Capitol Peak (14,137 ft)
- Isolation: 1.41 mi (2.27 km)
- Coordinates: 39°10′20″N 107°04′07″W

Naming
- Etymology: Charles P. Daly

Geography
- Location within Colorado Location within the United States
- Country: United States
- State: Colorado
- County: Pitkin
- Protected area: Maroon Bells–Snowmass Wilderness
- Parent range: Rocky Mountains; Elk Mountains
- Topo map: USGS Capitol Peak

Climbing
- Easiest route: class 2+

Mount Daly is a mountain summit in Pitkin County, Colorado, United States.

== Description ==
Mount Daly, elevation 13,323-feet (4,061 m), is situated in the Elk Mountains which are a subrange of the Rocky Mountains. The peak is located eight miles (13 km) southwest of the community of Snowmass Village in the Maroon Bells–Snowmass Wilderness, on land managed by White River National Forest. Precipitation runoff from the mountain's slopes drains into Capitol and Snowmass creeks which are tributaries of the Roaring Fork River. Topographic relief is significant as the summit rises 2,900 feet (884 m) above West Snowmass Creek in one mile (1.6 km).

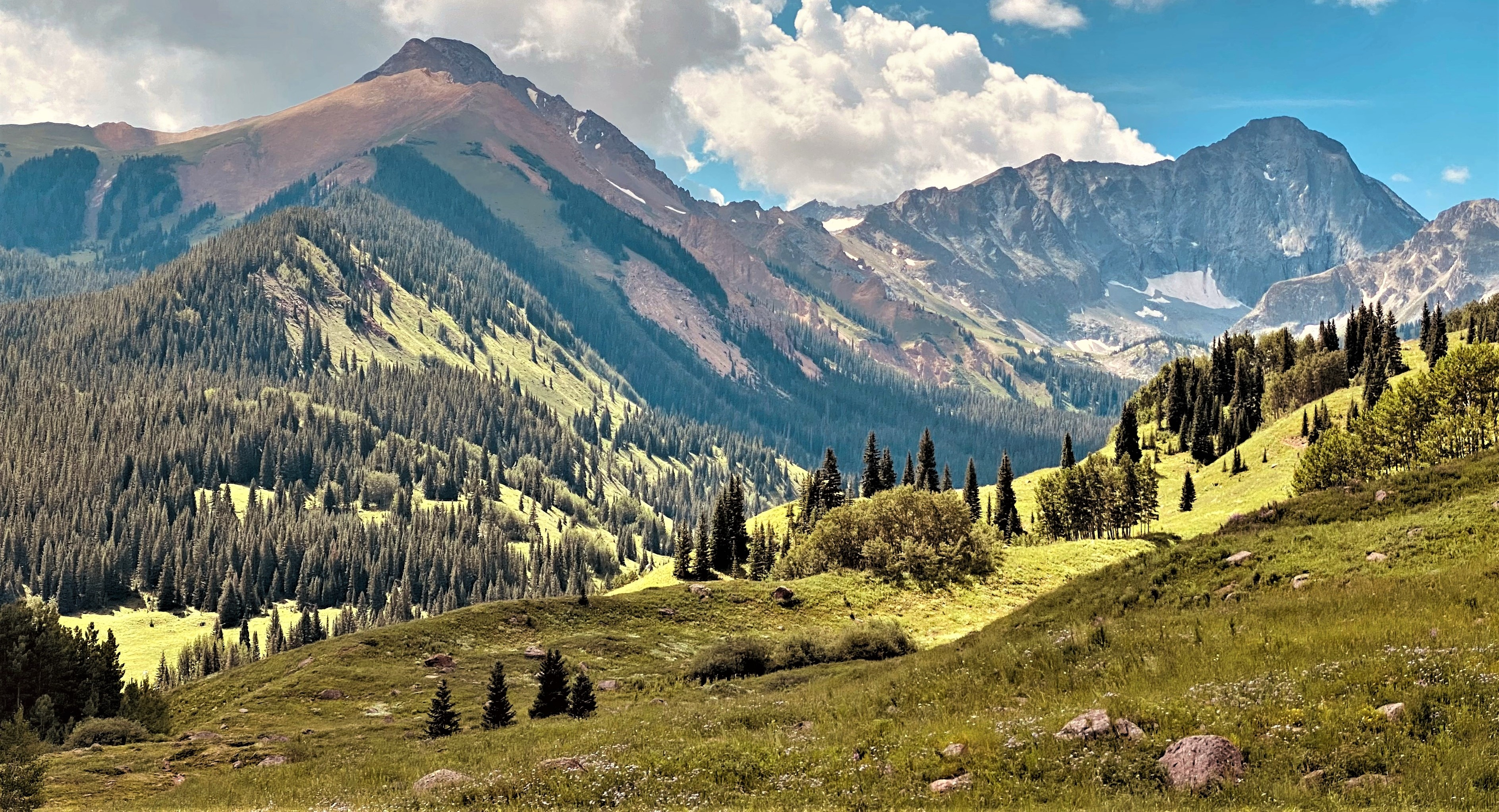
Mt. Daly (left), Capitol Peak (right) from the north

== Etymology ==
The mountain was named in 1874 by Henry Gannett during the Hayden Survey to honor Charles P. Daly (1816–1899), who was then president of the American Geographical Society. The landform's toponym was officially adopted on February 1, 1933, by the United States Board on Geographic Names, although it appeared in publications as early as 1877. There is a Mount Daly in Canada named for this same person. There is also another Mount Daly (12,615 ft) located six miles southwest in Gunnison County which has an unknown name origin.

== Climate ==
According to the Köppen climate classification system, Mount Daly is located in an alpine subarctic climate zone with cold, snowy winters, and cool to warm summers. Due to its altitude, it receives precipitation all year, as snow in winter, and as thunderstorms in summer, with a dry period in late spring.

== See also ==
- Thirteener
- Mountains of Pitkin County, Colorado
