= Metromelt =

Snow-melting machine

A Metromelt is a self-propelled snowmelter machine.

== History ==
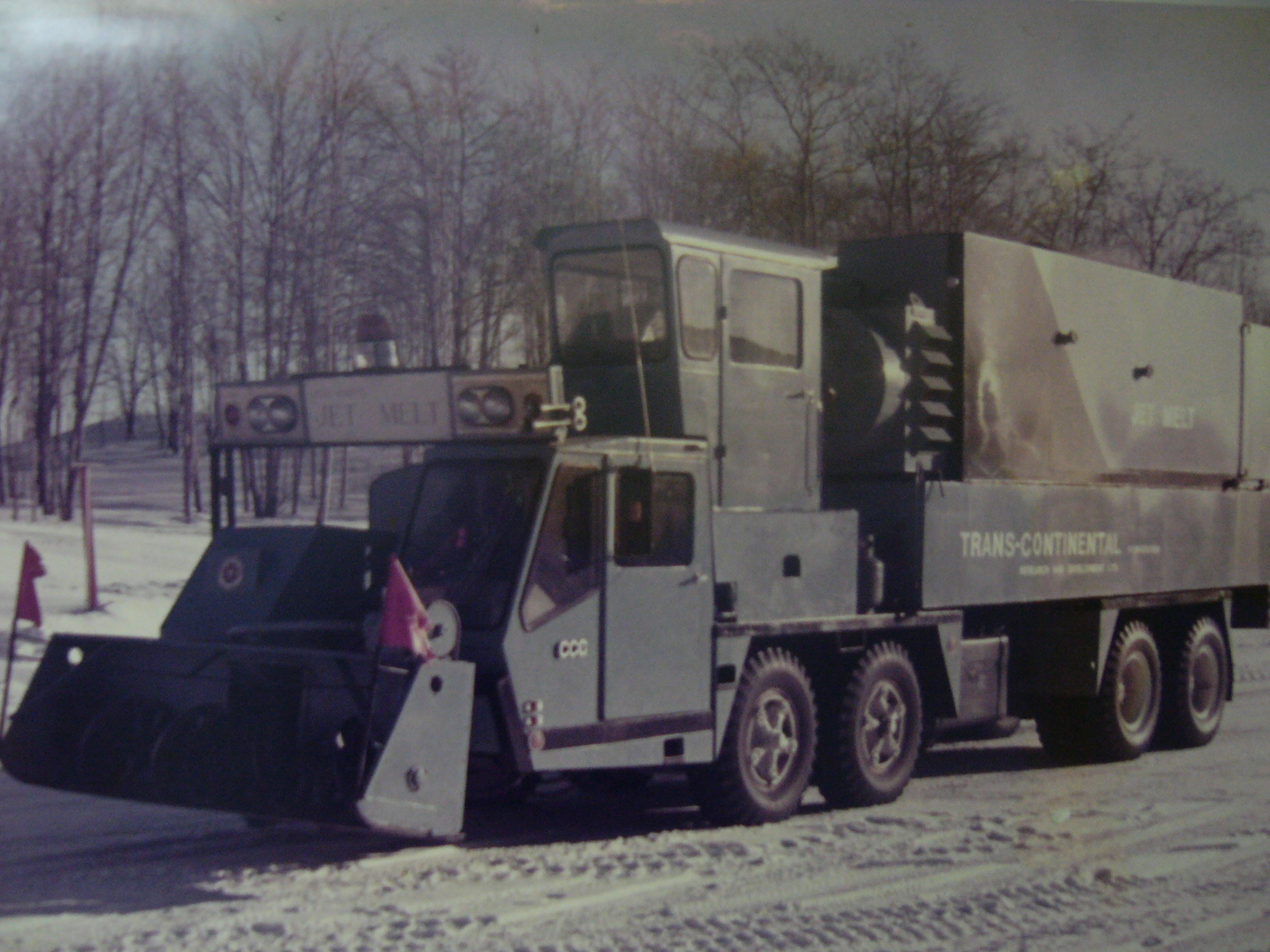

They were first built in 1974 for the then Toronto Metro Roads and Works department to remove major snow accumulations from roads managed by Metro Toronto. Built by Trecan Combustion Limited of Hubley, Nova Scotia, the city operates a fleet of 5 machines (8 wheeled self driven (with driver cab) vehicles are stored at Toronto Works Ellesmere Yard in Scarborough) along with the 350-PD unpowered snowmelter trailer units by Trecan. Trecan Metromelt and snowmelters are used throughout Canada, the United States and Russia. Mobile self-propelled snowmelters were originally invented and patented in Canada, European Union and the US by Albert Z Morin, the original inventor of the Jet Melt and likewise renowned and honored by Canada's highest innovation award for inventing the aerodynamic mudflap.

== Specifications ==
- Power plant: four-cylinder diesel engine
- Top Speed: 24 km/h (15 mph)
- Length: 17.4 m (57 ft 1 in)
- Height: 3.9 m (12 ft 10 in)
- Width: 3.1 m (10 ft 2 in) wide
- Ground clearance: 27 cm (10.6 in)
- Weight: 42.6 to 56 tonnes (41.9 to 55.1 long tons; 47.0 to 61.7 short tons)

The snow machine melts approximately 136 tonnes (134 long tons; 150 short tons) of snow per hour using air/fuel combustion to heat water and mix it with snow in a melting tank. The melted snow continuously drains from the tank, as it overflows, out of the melter and into storm drains or sewers along the road. The machine is self-propelled and self-loading, and resembles a large truck-mounted furnace with a snow-gathering conveyor belt at the front end.

== See also ==
- Trecan Combustion
