= Snowmelter =

Snow removal equipment

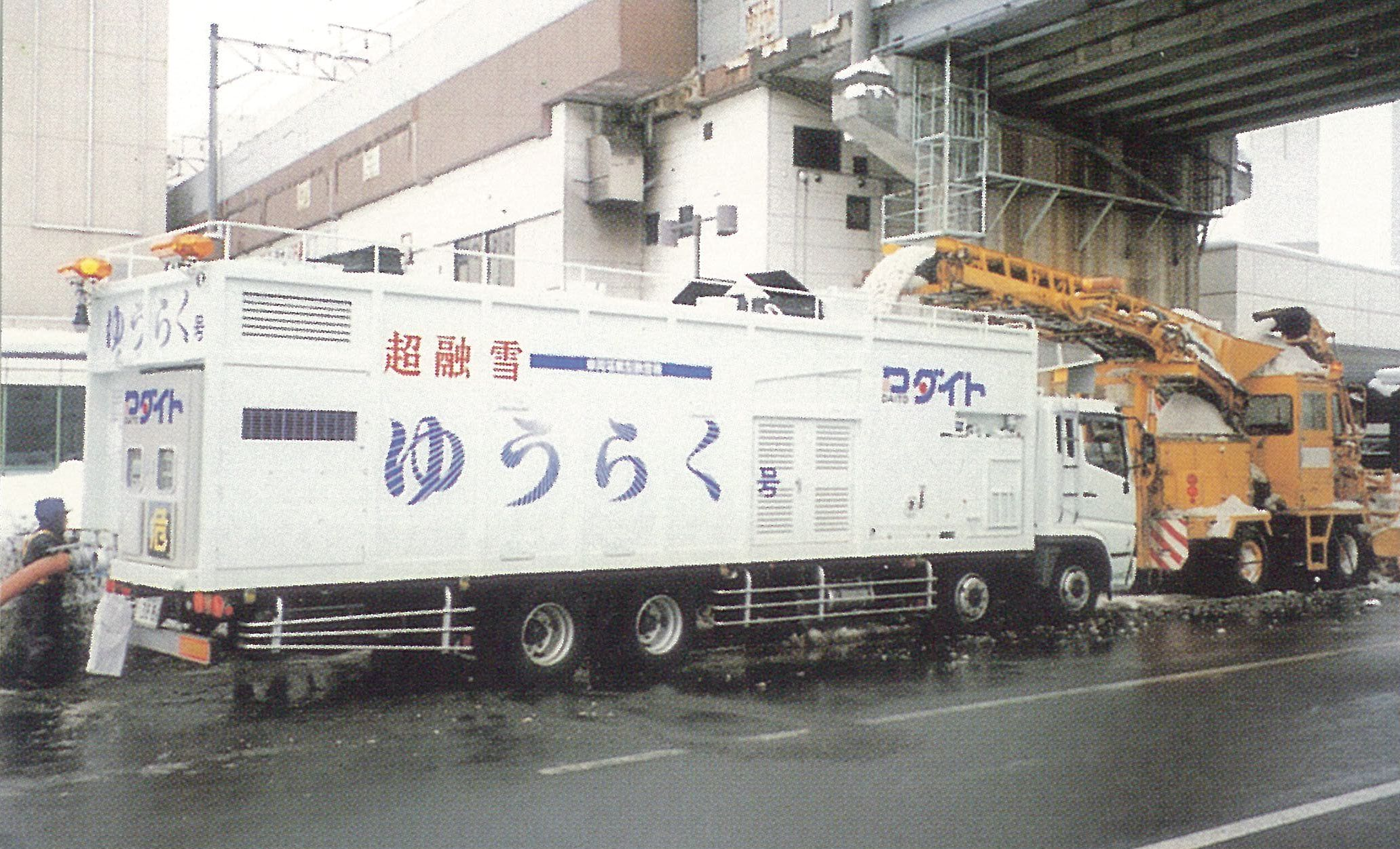
A mobile snow melter in Sapporo, Japan

A snow melter is a piece of snow removal equipment designed to melt snow using flame burners, hot water or both. The melt-water is discharged into a storm drain or onto the ground. Melting snow artificially helps keep roads, airport tarmacs and other surfaces clear and ready to use, and the technology is primarily employed in areas where trucking snow is not geographically or economically feasible. A built-in snowmelt system which melts the snow where it falls is another snow removal alternative.

Snow melters have been used since the 19th century.

== Comparison with dumping snow ==
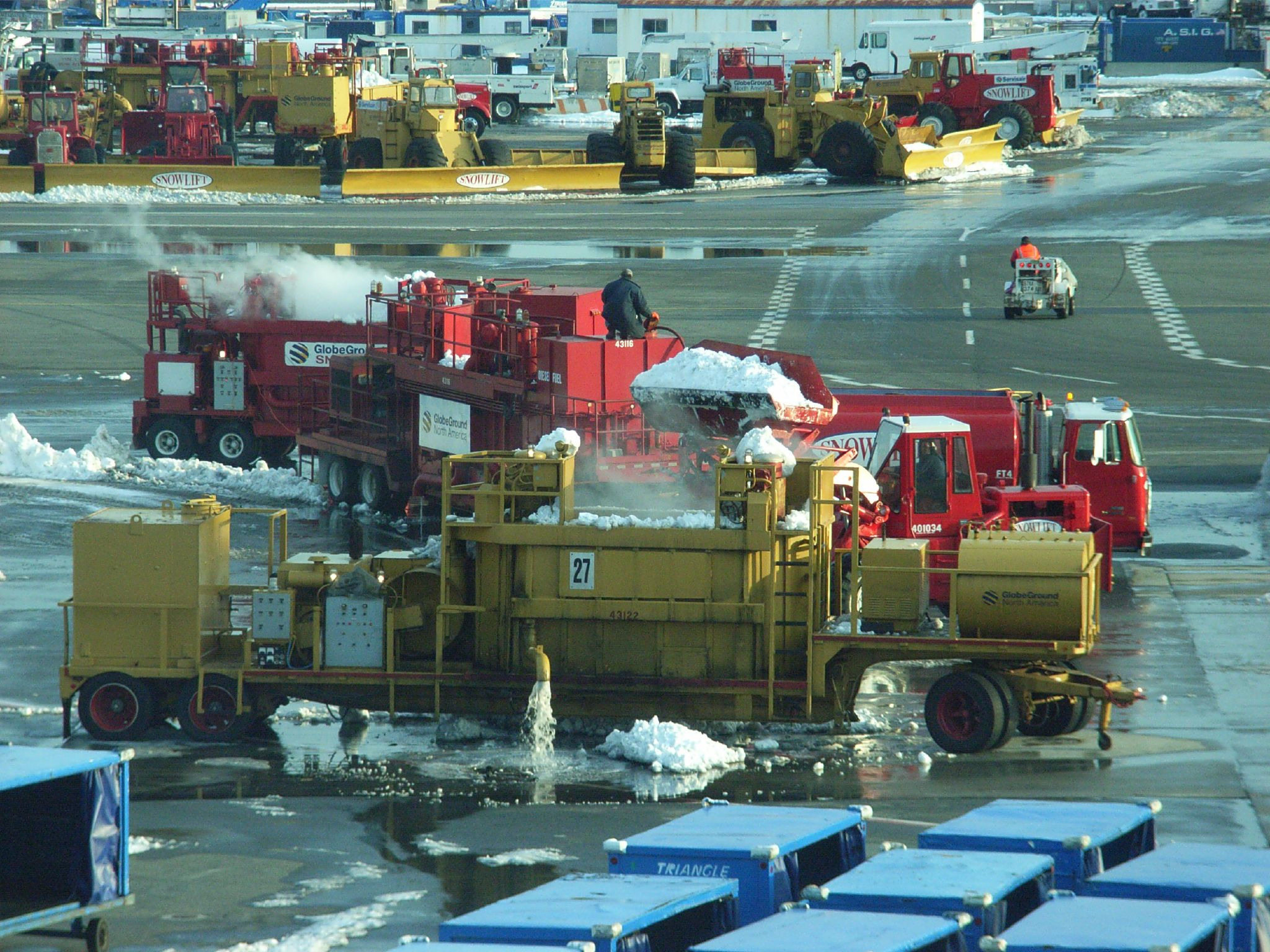
Three semi-mobile snow melters at an airport in New York City, United States

There are two main barriers to dumping snow, the cost and availability of land, and the cost and logistics of trucking snow. The dumping of snow into bodies of water is no longer allowed in many places for pollution reasons which leaves dumping the snow on land or melting the snow. The availability of land suitable for dumping is limited and in most urban areas, the cost of land is significant. Suitable land for a snow dump may be distant requiring trucking the snow to the remote dump sites. Thus, melting snow on site by using an industrial snow melter may be more cost-effective than trucking it to a remote location for disposal.

== Types ==
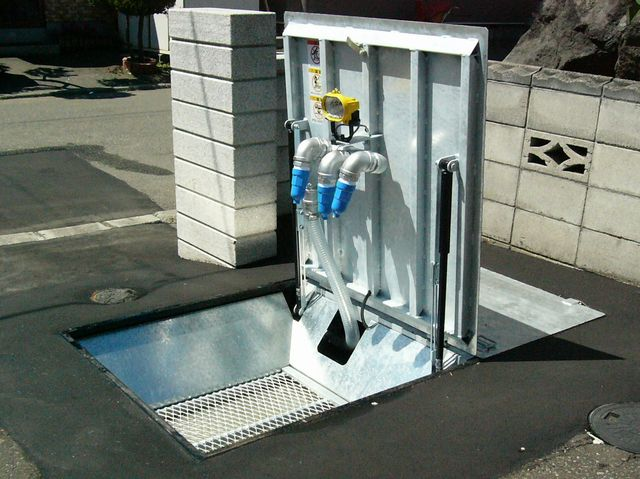
A stationary shower type snow melter

Basic types of snow melters are mobile, semi-mobile and stationary. Mobile snow melters drive down a street or along a rail line collecting snow and melting it. These often have a holding tank so the melt-water can be discharged at a designated location. Semi-mobile units have wheels and are moved into position and then loaded with snow by another machine. Stationary snowmelt systems may be built into the ground.

Submerged combustion snowmelters use a flame that is applied to the snow, or a water bath. The flame causes tiny bubbles to form that transfer their heat almost instantly to the bath. Snow melters are rated by how many tons of snow they can melt in one hour.

== Environmental issues ==
In the past, it was common for organizations that had access to bodies of water to dump snow in lakes, rivers, or oceans. However, much of the snow is contaminated with chemicals and debris that are harmful to the environment if left untreated, and many cities and other government bodies have placed limitations on dumping snow into bodies of water. The Massachusetts Department of Environmental Protection issue guidelines on how to properly remove snow. In it they state, "As snow melts, road salt, sand, litter, and other pollutants are transported into surface water or through the soil where they may eventually reach the groundwater." They recommend, "Avoid dumping of snow into any waterbody, including rivers, the ocean, reservoirs, ponds, or wetlands. In addition to water quality impacts and flooding, snow disposed of in open water can cause navigational hazards when it freezes into ice blocks."

Proponents for snowmelters claim that these essentially speed up the natural snowmelting process. They discharge the melt water into storm drains and sewer systems where the water is treated and released back into the local water systems. However they consume substantial amount of energy and the burning flames produce carbon dioxide, a greenhouse gas.

== See also ==
- Metromelt
- Winter service vehicle
