= Snowmass Mountain =

Mountain in Colorado, United States

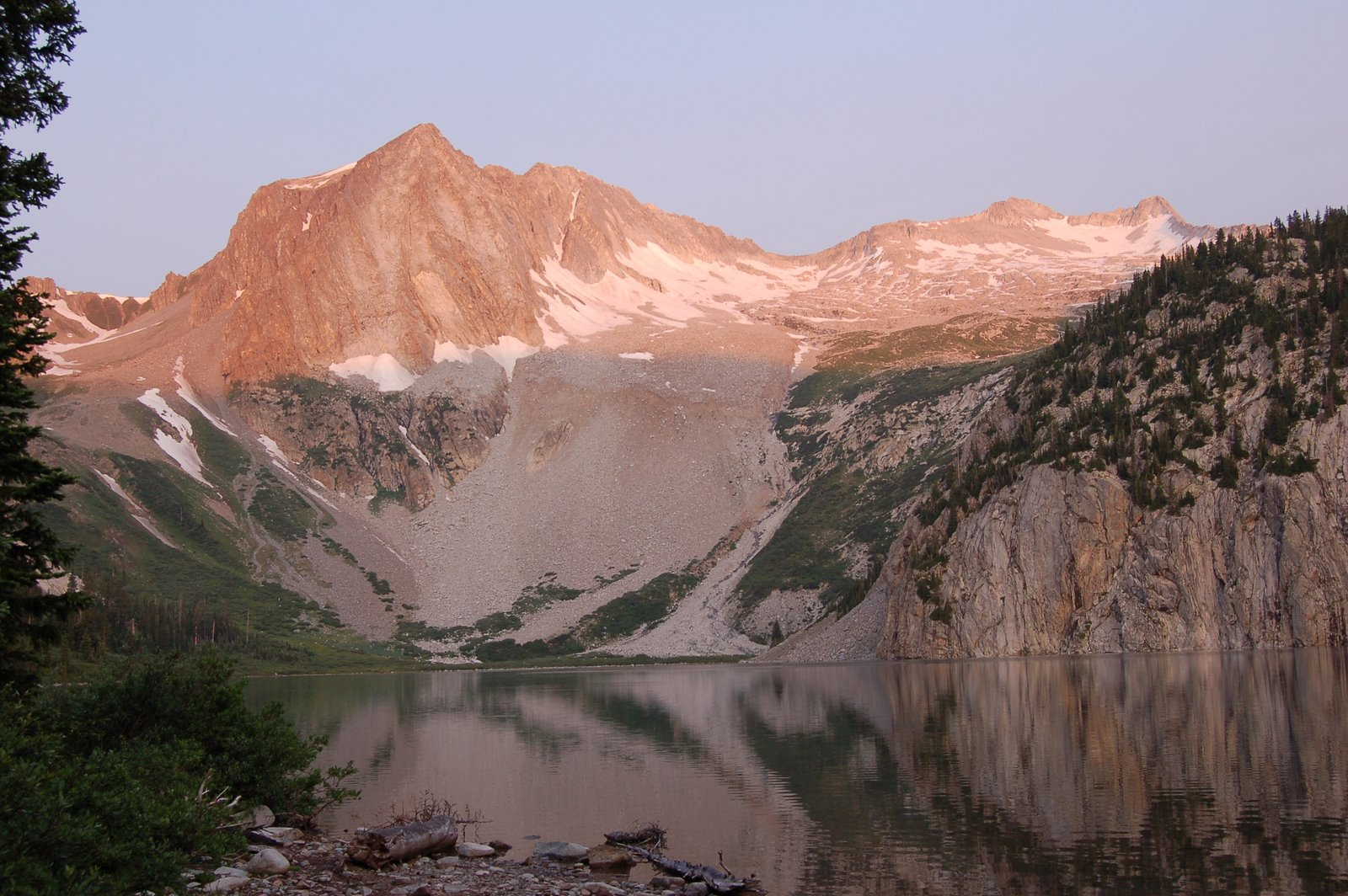
- Snowmass Mountain, July 2007

Highest point
- Elevation: 14,101.7 ft (4,298.2 m); NAPGD2022
- Prominence: 1,152 ft (351 m)
- Isolation: 2.34 mi (3.77 km)
- Listing: Colorado Fourteener 31st
- Coordinates: 39°07′08″N 107°03′59″W

Geography
- Location within Colorado
- Location: Gunnison and Pitkin counties, Colorado, United States
- Parent range: Elk Mountains
- Topo map(s): USGS 7.5' topographic map Snowmass Mountain, Colorado

Climbing
- First ascent: August 7, 1873 by William Byers, James Gardner and W. Rideling
- Easiest route: East Slopes: Scramble, class 3

Snowmass Mountain is a 14,101.7-foot-high (4,298.2 m) mountain in the U.S. state of Colorado, and the thirty-fourth highest mountain peak in the state. Located in the Elk Mountains within the Maroon Bells-Snowmass Wilderness of the White River National Forest, it lies along the border between Pitkin and Gunnison counties, west of Aspen and southwest of the town of Snowmass Village.

Snowmass Mountain is named for the large snowfield that lies on its eastern slopes. Snowmass Mountain should not be confused with the Snowmass ski area, located outside Snowmass Village; nor with nearby Snowmass Peak, a lower but more visually striking peak that towers over Snowmass Lake. Hagerman Peak sits between Snowmass Mountain and Snowmass Peak and is also often mistaken for Snowmass Mountain.

== Hiking/climbing ==
The route most commonly used to climb Snowmass Mountain is the Snowmass Creek approach. The route to the summit starts at Snowmass Lake, which is itself an 8.1-mile (13.0 km) hike up Snowmass Creek from the parking area. Most people hike to the lake, camp the night and then proceed to the top. This route is recommended in the spring and early summer when the snowfield still covers much of the route; however an ice axe and crampons are recommended for travel on the snowfield. Later in the summer there is more travel on talus (scree) and more danger from rockfall. An alternative in snow-free conditions is to hike up to the saddle between the peak and Hagerman Peak. From that point there are climbers' trails which proceed on the opposite (west) side of the ridge to the summit.

A different and much less used route climbs the west side of Snowmass Mountain from Geneva Lake, which is accessed from the North Fork of the Crystal River.

== Climate ==
Climate data for Snowmass Mountain 39.1195 N, 107.0640 W, Elevation: 13,432 ft (4,094 m) (1991–2020 normals)
Month	Jan	Feb	Mar	Apr	May	Jun	Jul	Aug	Sep	Oct	Nov	Dec	Year
Mean daily maximum °F (°C)	22.3 (−5.4)	21.7 (−5.7)	26.7 (−2.9)	31.6 (−0.2)	40.6 (4.8)	52.8 (11.6)	58.6 (14.8)	56.5 (13.6)	49.9 (9.9)	39.3 (4.1)	28.6 (−1.9)	22.4 (−5.3)	37.6 (3.1)
Daily mean °F (°C)	10.7 (−11.8)	9.7 (−12.4)	14.2 (−9.9)	18.9 (−7.3)	27.8 (−2.3)	38.9 (3.8)	44.9 (7.2)	43.3 (6.3)	36.7 (2.6)	26.8 (−2.9)	17.5 (−8.1)	11.1 (−11.6)	25.0 (−3.9)
Mean daily minimum °F (°C)	−1.0 (−18.3)	−2.3 (−19.1)	1.7 (−16.8)	6.1 (−14.4)	15.0 (−9.4)	25.1 (−3.8)	31.2 (−0.4)	30.1 (−1.1)	23.4 (−4.8)	14.4 (−9.8)	6.4 (−14.2)	−0.2 (−17.9)	12.5 (−10.8)
Average precipitation inches (mm)	6.80 (173)	7.07 (180)	6.29 (160)	6.16 (156)	3.89 (99)	1.58 (40)	2.47 (63)	2.59 (66)	3.19 (81)	3.55 (90)	5.56 (141)	6.22 (158)	55.37 (1,407)
Source: PRISM Climate Group

== Historical names ==
- Snowmass Mountain
- Snowmass Peak

== See also ==
- List of mountain peaks of Colorado
  - List of Colorado fourteeners
