= Hagerman Peak (Elk Mountains, Colorado) =

Mountain in Colorado, United States

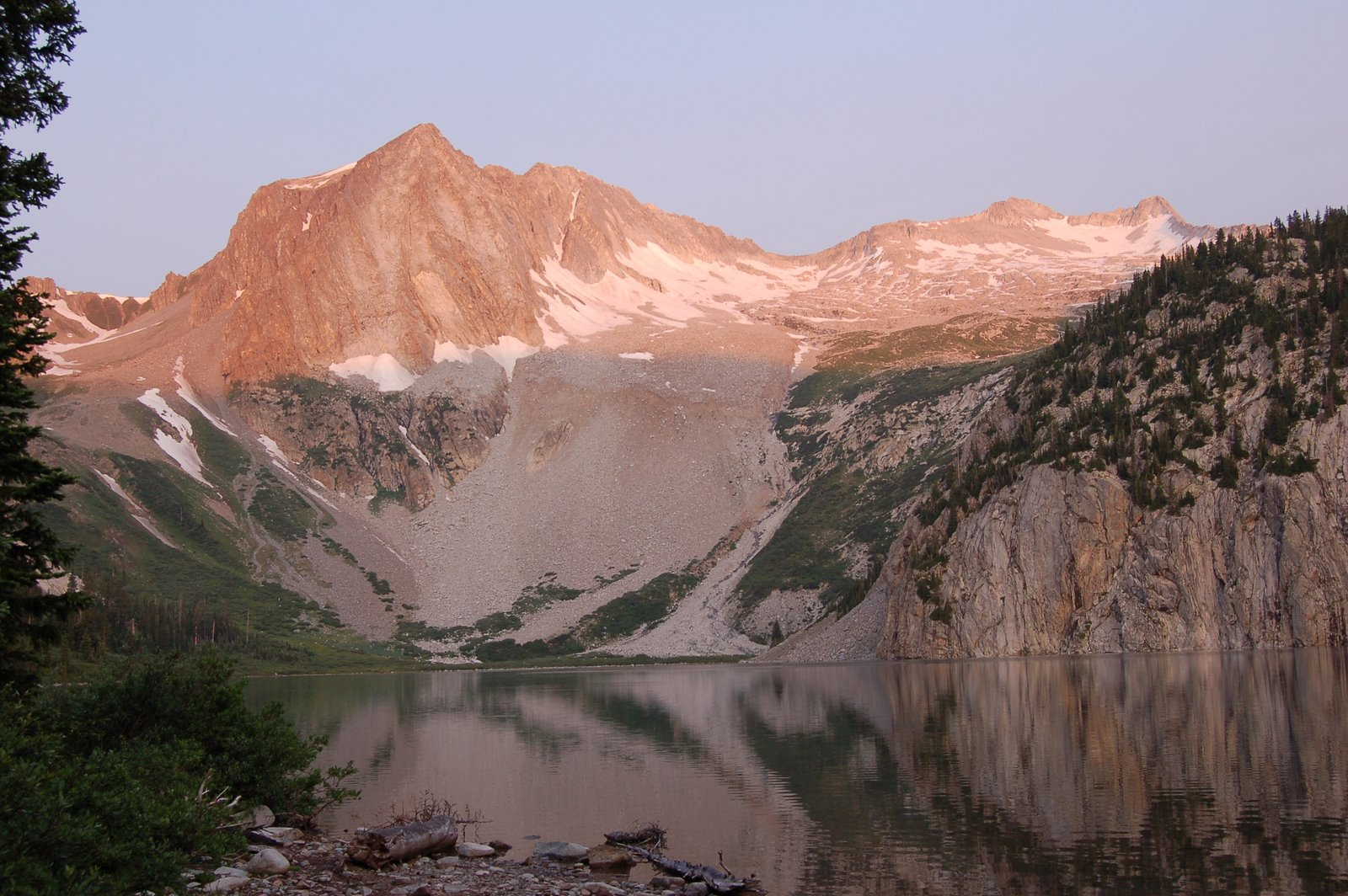
- Hagerman Peak

Highest point
- Elevation: 13,841 feet (4,219 m)
- Prominence: 347 feet (106 m)
- Parent peak: Snowmass Mountain
- Isolation: 0.53 miles (0.85 km)
- Coordinates: 39.112113°N 107.060348°W

Geography
- Location within Colorado Location within the United States
- Location: Gunnison and Pitkin counties, Colorado, U.S.
- Parent range: Elk Mountains
- Topo map(s): USGS 7.5' topographic map Snowmass Peak, Colorado

Hagerman Peak is a Colorado mountain in the Elk Mountains of the American state of Colorado. It was named for Percy Hagerman, who was the first to climb the peak with Henry Clark in 1907.

It is in the elite group of Colorado's 100 highest "centennial" mountains, all of which stand 13,800 feet (4,200 m) or higher.

== Nearby peaks ==
Hagerman stands 0.6 miles (0.97 km) from Snowmass Peak; from Snowmass Lake which is about 1 mile (1.6 km) east, Snowmass Peak appears higher than Hagerman—this is forced perspective. Snowmass Peak is the end of the east ridge of Hagerman as it descends 0.4 miles (0.64 km) below Hagerman's summit.

Also nearby are Capitol Peak, and Clark Peak. It is also close to Buckskin Pass and Maroon Peak and North Maroon Peak.
