= Snowmastodon site =

Paleontological site in Colorado, United States

Coordinates: 39.21°N 106.93°W

Poster for the Snowmastodon Project of the Denver Museum of Nature & Science.

The Snowmastodon site, also known as the Ziegler Reservoir fossil site, is the location of an important Ice Age fossil excavation near Snowmass Village, Colorado. Fossils were first discovered on October 14, 2010, during the construction of a 5 hectares (12 acres) reservoir to supply Snowmass Village with water. Over the subsequent weeks, after an agreement had been reached to allow paleontological excavation, crews from the Denver Museum of Nature & Science and the U.S. Geological Survey worked along with the construction crews as more fossil material was uncovered. The site closed for five months over the winter, reopening May 15, 2011. Between May 15 and July 4, 2011, crews from the Denver Museum of Nature & Science conducted a large scale fossil excavation alongside construction crews building a dam for the reservoir. In total over 36,000 vertebrate fossils (including mammoths, mastodons, ground sloths, horses, camels and deer), more than 100 species of fossil invertebrates and over 100 species of fossil plants were found in sediments deposited by an alpine lake during the last interglacial period.

== Discovery ==
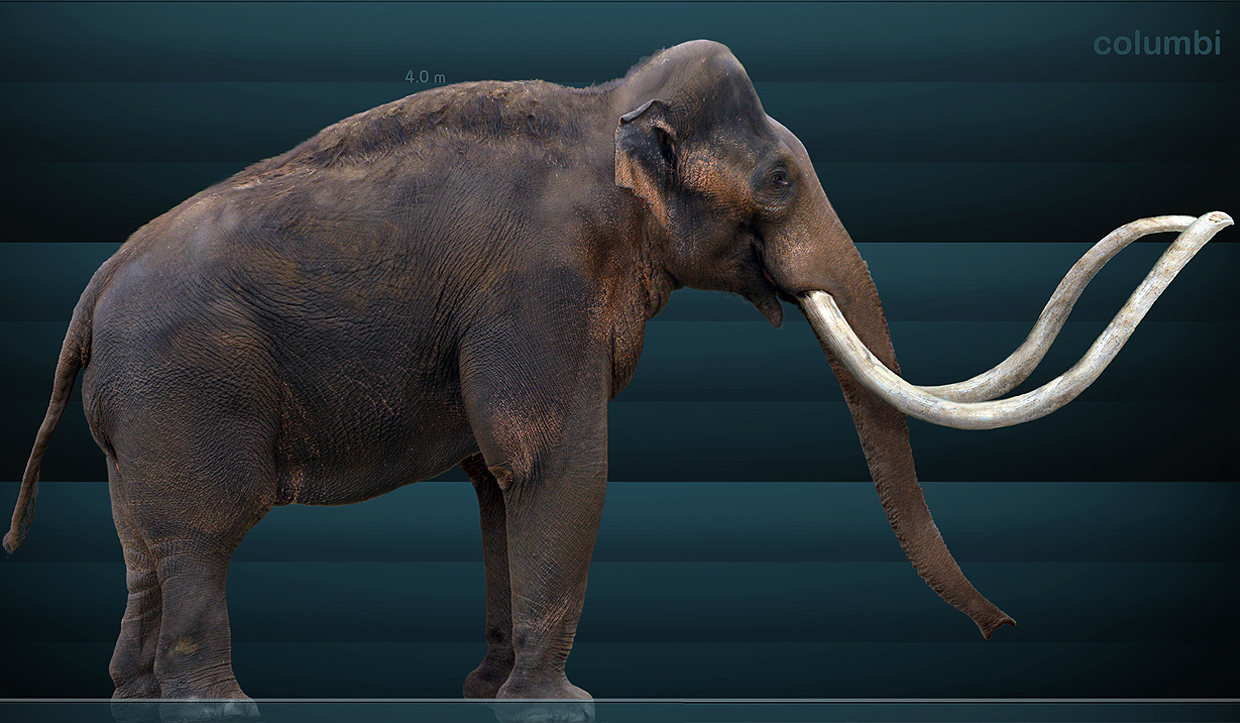
Artist's restoration of a Columbian mammoth (Mammuthus columbi), the first fossil species recovered from the site.

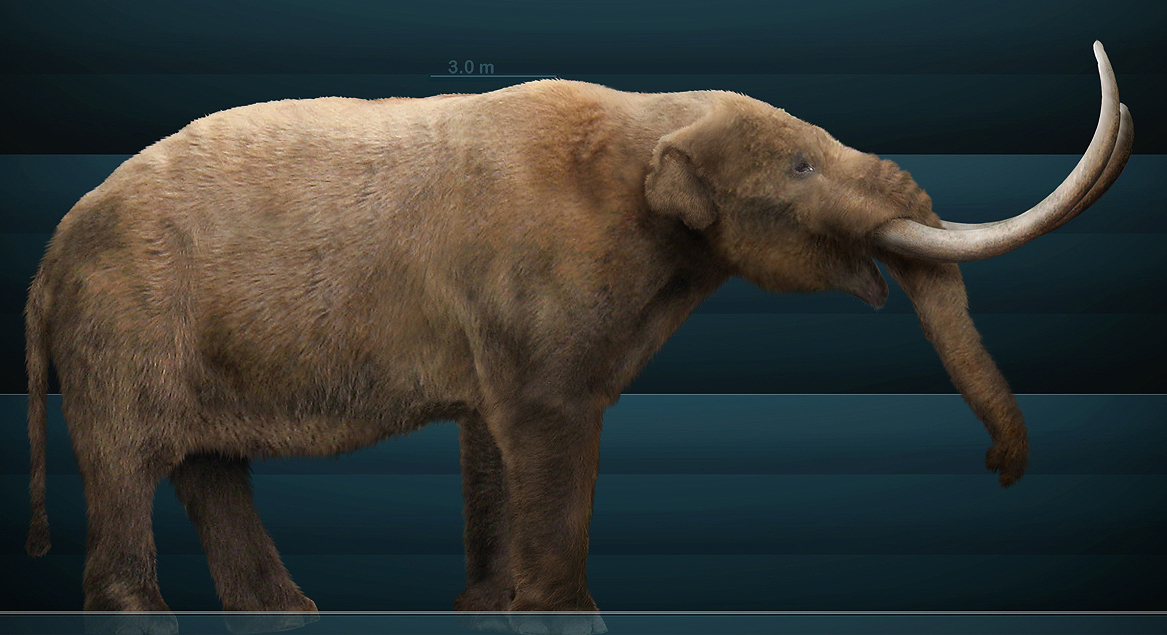
Artist's restoration of an American mastodon (Mammut americanum), the most numerous of the megafauna discovered in the Snowmass Village fossil site.

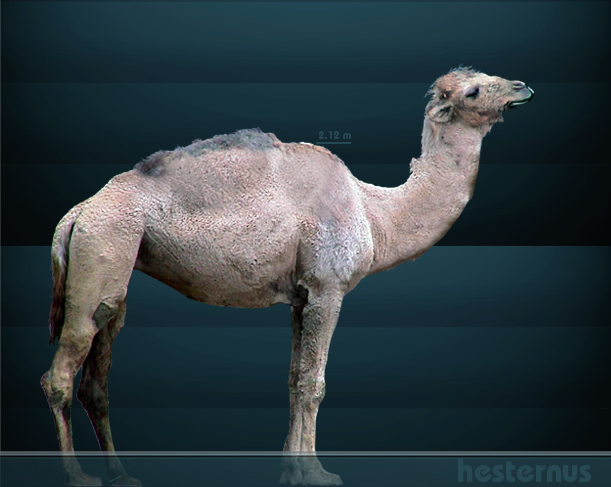
Artist's restoration of Camelops

The fossil site was discovered on October 14, 2010, by Gould Construction Inc. crews who had been employed by the Snowmass Water and Sanitation District (SWSD) to expand the Ziegler Reservoir and provide additional water supplies to the nearby town of Snowmass Village.

While clearing the perimeter of the reservoir, bulldozer operator Jesse Steele unearthed the first animal bones.

Recognizing them as possible fossils, Steele informed project foreman, Kent Olson. Olsen took the bones home and identified them as belonging to a mammoth using sources he found on the internet. The next morning, Kit Hamby, the district manager for the Snowmass Water and Sanitation District (SWSD), contacted a contractor from the Colorado Geological Survey who contacted the Denver Museum of Nature & Science (DMNS). The DMNS reached an agreement with the SWSD to allow the museum to excavate the fossils.

Crews from the Denver Museum, U.S. Geological Survey, and several other institutions work alongside bulldozers for two weeks in order to salvage the increasing number of fossils being unearthed. The onset of winter caused the site to be closed for five months beginning November 15. When the excavation resumed on May 15, 2011, museum crews had 7 weeks to complete the excavation in order for the reservoir project to be completed on time.

By the time excavation had been completed, the team consisting of more than 250 volunteers and 40 project scientists removed approximately 8000 cubic meters of sediment. Thousands of fossils were collected along with stratigraphic, geochronologic, palynologic, paleoentomologic, and paleobotanic data that was subsequently used to reconstruct the paleoecosystem at ancient Lake Ziegler.

== Snowmastodon Project ==
A $10.5 million dam for the reservoir was scheduled to be completed by mid-October 2011, with the site was expected to be underwater by November 2011. For that reason, any paleontological excavation had to be done quickly. The excavations were led by the Denver Museum of Nature & Science, together with the U.S. Geological Survey and scientists from at least 19 institutions. The Snowmastodon Project, as the efforts had been dubbed, cost approximately $1 million, including public outreach programs. Half of the costs were covered by grants and gifts to the museum, while the rest came from donations.

The first scientific excavation officially began on November 2, 2010. It involved 67 workers from the Denver Museum of Nature & Science, and lasted 12 days. Preliminary efforts concluded on November 14, 2010, when the arrival of winter prevented any further excavation. The site and fossils left in situ were protected with frost-free barrier and the recovered fossils taken to the conservation laboratory of the DMNS. More than 600 bones and 130 plant, rock, and invertebrate samples were recovered, including the first mastodon skull ever recovered in Colorado (unearthed a mere day after the beginning of the excavation) and the first remains of a Jefferson's ground sloth to be found in the state. Other megafauna recovered included giant bison, two deer-like animals, and more mammoths.

Excavations resumed during spring of 2011, from May 15 to July 4, with the support and permission of SWSD and the State of Colorado. By the end of July, the total number of bones recovered was around 36,000, from at least 52 different Ice Age vertebrate animals. Approximately 3,000 of them are believed to come from mastodons of both sexes and of varying ages, from infants to full adults. Other new animals recovered included an Ice Age camel, a horse, and various smaller vertebrates.

A small excavation crew from the museum remained at the site, in the event further discoveries were made in the course of the dam construction.

The speed at which the fossils were recovered (more or less seven weeks) is remarkable for a scientific dig of this size. Kirk R. Johnson, leader of the Snowmastodon Project on behalf of the Denver Museum of Nature & Science, told the New York Times, "The speed of this thing is so unlike normal science — from discovery to completion of one of the biggest digs ever in less than nine months."

Scientists are not concerned now that the site is covered by water after completion of the reservoir expansion. Being underwater helps preserve the fossils and the reservoir can be drained if ever the need arises for additional excavations.

== Importance ==
The Ziegler Reservoir fossil site is one of the few localities in North America from the Sangamonian Stage, and the only one at high elevation. This site preserves multiple alpine ecosystems stacked on top of each other within sediments of ancient alpine lake. Among the vertebrate fauna, this site represents highest known elevations of a number of species. Additionally, this site holds the record for the most mastodons preserved in a single location, including the largest mastodon ever found. The fossil flora offer unprecedented insights into plant biogeography of the Rocky Mountains during the last interglacial period.

The site is also important for the exceptional preservation of fossil material. Fossil sedge and willow leaves were still green, conifer cones were still intact, and large driftwood logs were preserved. In addition, the mollusks and gastropods showed color, and beetle parts were still iridescent. Vertebrate fossil material was in excellent condition as well.

The National Geographic Society, which donated a $55,000 grant to the project, featured the site in the National Geographic Magazine . The science television series Nova broadcast an episode about the site in February, 2012.

== Geologic setting and geochronology ==
The Ziegler Reservoir occupies an unusual geologic setting on top of a ridge 8,875 feet (2,705 m) above sea level. The lake basin was formed when a glacier flowing down Snowmass Creek Valley became thick enough to overtop the adjacent ridgeline. As the glacier retreated, a moraine impounded a 5 hectare alpine lake that was initially 10 meters deep. Over time, the lake filled in with wind-blown sediments until it became a marshland and ultimately an alpine meadow. After Doug Ziegler and his family purchased the land that now contains the Ziegler Reservoir, they commissioned the construction of a small earthen dam in 1961 to block the meadow drainage and form a shallow, private lake that persisted until the Snowmass Water and Sanitation District bought the water rights in 2010.

Several dating techniques were employed in order to determine the age of the ancient lake sediments. Attempts at radiocarbon dating of lake organics, bone collagen and shell carbonate, revealed that the site was radiocarbon dead or greater than 45,000 years old. In situ cosmogenic beryllium and aluminum from a boulder that was part of the bounding moraine yielded an age of approximately 140,000 years old. Uranium-series dating of vertebrate fossils confirmed the age range of 45,000-140,000 years; however, the extremely low uranium concentrations limited the utility of that method. Optically stimulated luminescence (OSL) ages obtained from the fine-grained quartz provided reliable, replicable ages for the sediments within the established 45,000 – 140,000 time frame. The dates obtained via OSL correlate with the end of the Bull Lake glaciation and the Sangamon interglacial stage, spanning marine isotope stages 6 through 4.

== Vertebrate fauna ==
Over 36,000 bones and teeth belonging to 52 taxa of macro- and microvertebrates were uncovered during the construction of Ziegler Reservoir. These taxa represent a diverse assemblage of fauna belonging to the Rancholabrean North American Land Mammal Age. The smaller vertebrate species include: trout, frog, salamander, snake, lizard, duck, goose, pheasant, crane, finch, shrew, river otter, bear, coyote, rabbit, chipmunk, squirrel, beaver, mice and other small rodents. The most abundant species found throughout the site is the tiger salamander.

Also represented in the Ziegler Reservoir are the remains of seven megafauna taxa. These taxa include:

- Columbian mammoth (Mammuthus columbi): Four individuals, including the first fossil recovered from the site (a juvenile nicknamed 'Snowy') were collected.
- American mastodon (Mammut americanum): The Ziegler Reservoir is the largest site for mastodons in the world with at least 35 individuals present. Approximately 60% of the total number of vertebrate elements recovered belong to the American mastodon.
- Jefferson's ground sloth (Megalonyx jeffersonii): Three individuals, one adult and two juveniles, were found at the site. This marks the first time this species has been found in Colorado.
- Giant bison (Bison latifrons): At least 10 individuals were found making the Ziegler Reservoir one of only three sites to produce multiple individuals of B. latifrons and the highest known elevation for this species.
- Deer: At least two individuals of indeterminate species.
- Camelops: A single tooth belonging to the extinct camel genus Camelops was found in lake-center deposits. This is the highest known elevation for this genus.
- Horse: A single foot bone from an indeterminate species of Equus.

== Invertebrate fauna ==
Fossil insects

A total of 99 taxa of insect were identified from samples spanning the interval of 125,000 to 77,000 years ago. These fossils are the oldest known Pleistocene high elevation insect faunas from the Rocky Mountains. The fossil assemblages were dominated by beetles, ants, midges, and caddisflies, which were used to document the climatic oscillations during the time represented by the samples.

Mollusks and ostracodes

Sediments containing terrestrial and aquatic mollusks and ostracods span 130,000 to 87,000 years ago. These sediments produced 12 identifiable taxa of terrestrial gastropods, 5 taxa of aquatic bivalves, 8 taxa of aquatic gastropods, along with 7 taxa of ostracodes. These taxa indicate that the ancient lakeshore was a shallow, well-vegetated, fresh water wetland during the time periods sampled.

== Fossil flora ==
A diverse assemblage of plant macrofossils and pollen was collected during Snowmastodon. Approximately 99 taxa of plant macrofossil, including seeds, leaves, needles, cones, twigs and wood were identified. Over 300 specimens of fossil wood were collected ranging in size from small stems to logs greater than 50 cm in diameter and more than 10 m in length. The majority of wood fossils came from the “beach” horizon at the lake margin. Species of fir, Douglas fir, spruce and pine were represented. The pollen collected includes species of sagebrush, spruce, pine, oak, Douglas fir, fir, juniper, as well as herbaceous and aquatic plants.

== See also ==
- Denver Museum of Nature and Science
- List of fossil sites
- Pitkin County, Colorado
- Pleistocene megafauna
- Snowmass Village, Colorado
- Southern Rocky Mountains
