= Snowmelt system =

System to prevent the build-up of snow and ice

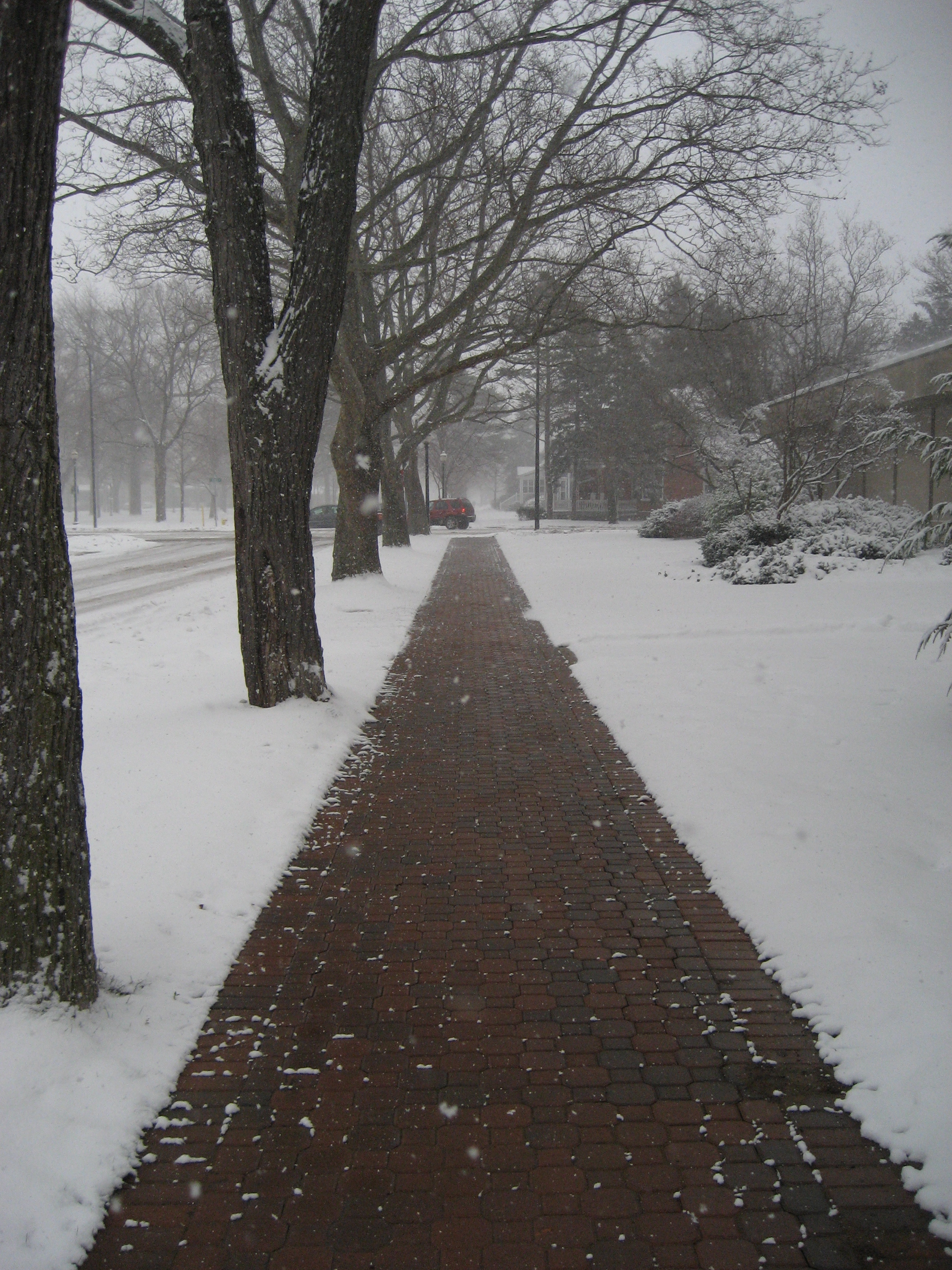
A heated sidewalk in Holland, Michigan

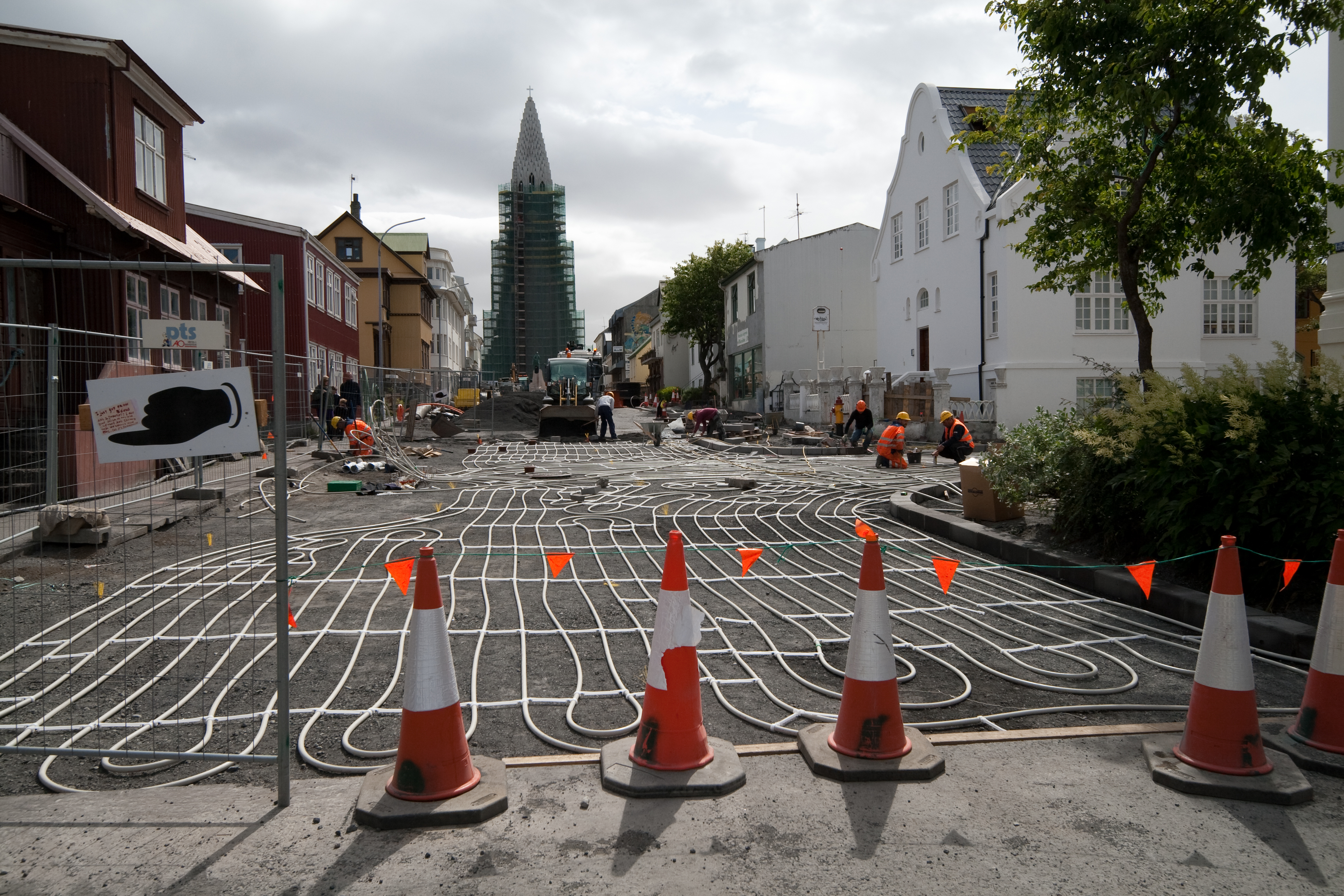
Installation of a geothermal snowmelt system on a street in Reykjavík, Iceland.

A snowmelt system is a system that prevents the build-up of snow and ice on sidewalks, roads, or driveways by using warm fluid to melt it. They are designed to function during a storm to improve safety and eliminate winter maintenance labor including shoveling, plowing snow and spreading de-icing salt or traction grit (sand). A snowmelt system may extend the life of the concrete, asphalt or under pavers by eliminating the use of salts or other de-icing chemicals, and physical damage from winter service vehicles. Many systems are fully automatic and require no human input to maintain a snow/ice-free horizontal surface.

Systems are available in three broad types based on the heat source: electric resistance heat, heat from a conventional boiler (or furnace), or geothermal heat hydronically (in a fluid). Arguably, electric snowmelt systems requires less maintenance than hydronic snowmelt systems because there are minimal moving parts and no corroding agents. However, electric snowmelt systems tend to be much more expensive to operate.

Most new snowmelt systems operate in conjunction with an automatic activation device that will turn the system on when it senses precipitation and freezing temperatures, and turn the system off when temperatures are above freezing. These types of devices ensure the system is only active during useful periods and reduce energy waste. A high-limit thermostat further increases efficiency when installed in conjunction with the automatic snow melt controller to temporarily disable the system once the slab/surface has reached a sufficient snow melting temperature. Some building codes require the high-limit thermostat to prevent energy waste. Total environmental impact depends on the energy source used.

== Electric snowmelt systems ==
Electric snowmelt systems are composed of three basic components: heating cable, a control unit and an activation device.

The heating cable is built to withstand harsh conditions to make it suitable for outdoor usage. The cable should be listed to UL standards by a Nationally Recognized Testing Laboratory and many consist of a single or dual conductor with a protective coating and/or insulation. Many cables are rated at 105 °C (221 °F) and produce 6–50 W/ft. Power per area is determined by heating element spacing.

The control units are typically wall-mounted control panels and can be mounted in a NEMA enclosure. Control units vary by technology by using line and load terminal blocks, relays, activation terminals, transformers, as well as monitoring electronics.

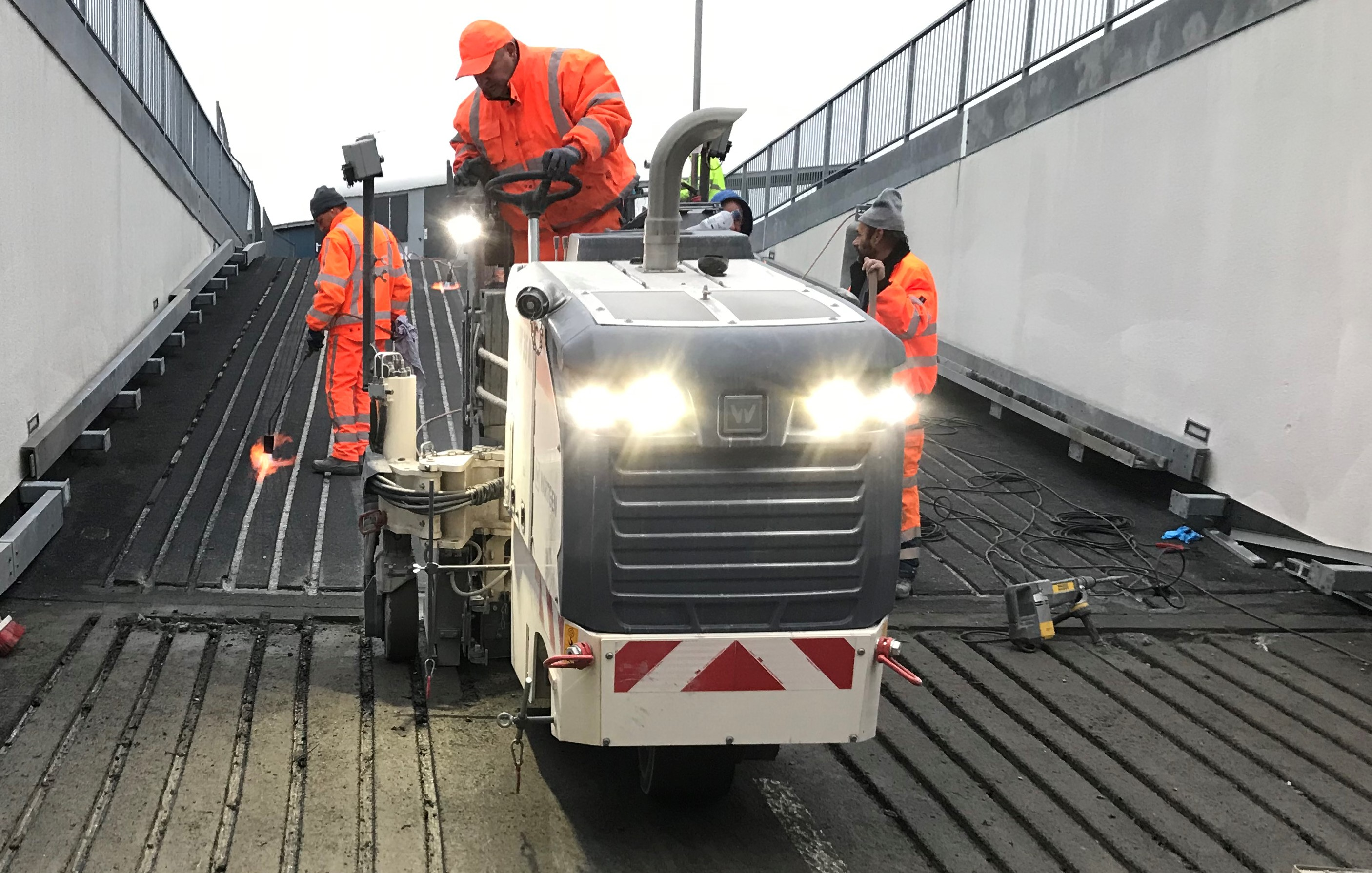
Construction of grooves for snowmelt installation.

In recent years a new technology has been developed to address melting snow on asphalt surfaces. Although asphalt pavements are the most common pavement type worldwide, there is no accepted heating solution for this infrastructure class for melting snow and preventing ice formation at the ride-surface. This novel methodology is utilizing electric ribbon technology as a suitable heating solution. A new method was proposed to introduce ribbon heaters into the typical paving process in a practical manner, causing minimal disruption to the normal paving operations, that is potentially expandable to large areas. The advocated idea was to deploy ribbons after an asphalt concrete lift has been paved and compacted, and before paving and compacting the next asphalt concrete lifts. In this context, a special grooving machine was envisioned to make shallow channels in the asphalt for cradling each ribbon.

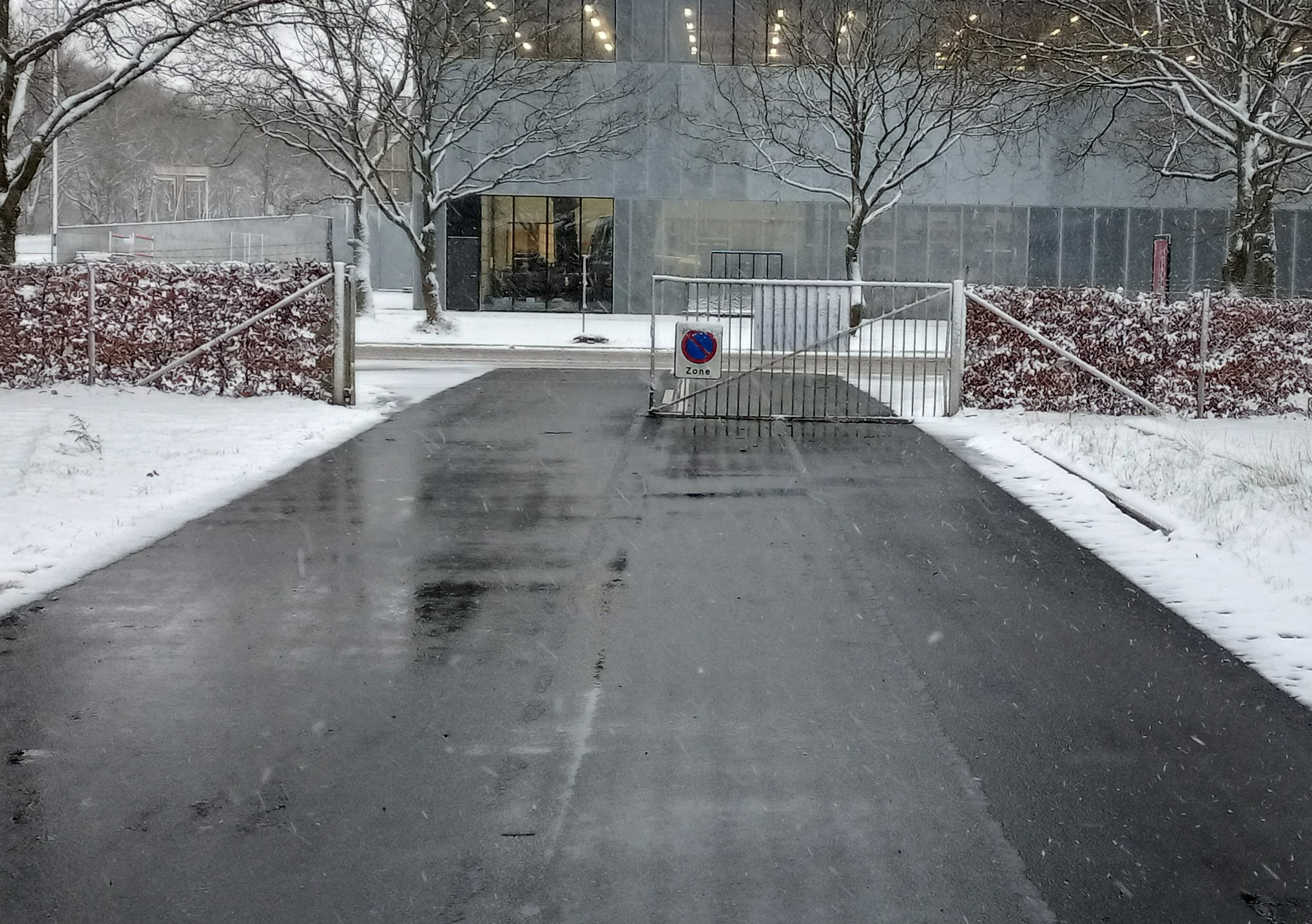
Snowless technology in Brandenburg, Germany

== Hydronic snowmelt systems ==
The heating element in a hydronic system is a closed-loop tubing or modular thermapanel system made of a flexible polymer or synthetic rubber that circulates a mixture of hot water and propylene glycol (antifreeze). The fluid is warmed to temperatures of 16 °C (61 °F) to 60 °C (140 °F) to warm surrounding concrete/asphalt/concrete pavers and melt snow and ice. Mechanical system technology for hydronic snowmelt systems is based on the same technology as radiant heating systems.

Hydronic tubes that are cast into concrete slabs will create an uneven heating pattern in the concrete thus causing uneven stresses to occur within the concrete slab. The use of high temperature fluid entering a very cold slab will create stress cracks and possible spalling of the concrete surface. Close tube spacing and a controlled slow increase in temperature will lessen the negative effects of a tube based system. Another method is to maintain a minimum slab temperature above freezing throughout the winter season.

An alternative to tube based systems is pre-insulated, HDPE modular heat exchange thermal panel units. The HDPE modular panels fit pedestal mounted pavers (typically used on rooftop installations) in a modular grid layout of between 23.5–26 inches on center. They may also be used with any type of ground mounted, cast in place concrete or raised deck mounted pavers, wood or PVC decking.

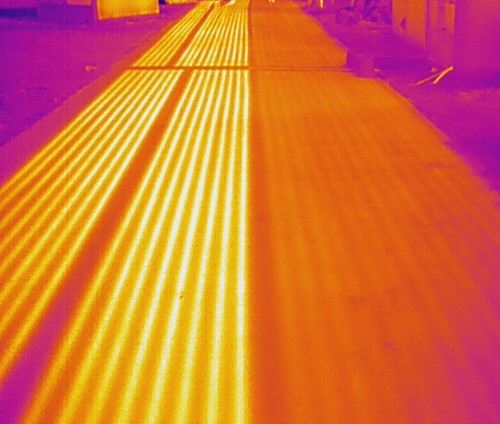
Thermal imaging of a snowmelt system, DTU University, Copenhagen, Denmark

Like electric snowmelt systems, hydronic snowmelt systems may be installed in or beneath the base surface material (sand). The subgrade should be well compacted with an appropriate road base material that meets ICPI (International Concrete Paver Institute) or the paver manufacturer's guidelines before beginning tube or thermapanel installation. Uneven settlement may damage the system and provide a structurally weak pavement. Tubing can be fastened with cable ties to either the re-mesh, rebar or stapled to below slab insulation. Insulated modular thermapanel systems do not require re-mesh or rebar and are laid out in pre-connected rows onto the compacted sub-base. When a modular thermapanel system is set under a concrete slab, re-mesh or rebar within the concrete monolith may be necessary.

Modular, fluid thermal transfer panel systems provide full and even heat exchange with the entire paver or concrete area as opposed to the spacing required by a tube based system. Full coverage allows for the use of lower temperature fluid which lowers the operating cost and lessens the thermal impact to the pavement structure thus reducing the deterioration of the concrete surface. The surface also comes up to temperature and can be cooled quicker.

Modular snowmelt systems can also be used to collect solar thermal energy from the pavement on warm days for the heating of pools and domestic or industrial purposes. They may also be utilized to cool the pavement surface, particularly around swimming pools or on pedestal mounted rooftop paver terraces which get very hot due to the paver being uncoupled from the building thus creating a solar battery which in turn increases the urban heat island effect in the immediate vicinity.

== Geothermal systems ==
In Japan, a widely employed system known as shosetsu or yuusetsu melts snow by spraying geothermally heated groundwater onto the road surface.

== Operation costs ==
Operating costs vary by region, energy source (electric, gas, propane, etc.) used and costs associated. The American Society of Heating, Refrigerating and Air-Conditioning Engineers has standards intended to achieve satisfactory results and to minimize energy consumption from over-sizing or over-designing a system. Systems are typically designed to produce 70–170 BTU per square foot hour using ASHRAE guidelines by region. The time to melt snow from a surface varies by storm and how much power the system is designed to produce.

== Activation devices ==
There are a number of activation devices used for snow melting applications. Some activators are a simple manual timer that activate the system to stay on for a specified time period while others sense temperature and moisture or just temperature conditions to automatically activate the snow melt system. Automatic devices can be aerial-mounted, pavement mounted or gutter mounted. High-end activation devices feature adjustable temperature trigger points, adjustable delay off cycle, and upgradeable remote activation. The activation device enables the snowmelt system to run 100% automated.

Self-regulating trace heating cables automatically regulate the amount of heat supplied so that only those parts with temperatures below the set point are heated.

Careful placement of the sensors is important to have an effective result when using these activators. Activation moisture sensors should be placed in a location where they will effectively collect any moisture from a snow storm and in relatively close proximity to the area to be free of snow and ice. Temperature sensors are installed outside to sense the same temperature conditions that the surface that the snow melting system will experience. Other activators, such as manual timers or switches can be installed in a convenient location.

== Retrofit installations ==
Retrofit installations are possible with electric systems by cutting grooves 1 1/4 to 1 1/2 inches deep and 1/4 to 3/8 inches wide into the asphalt or concrete, inserting the cables and sealing the grooves with backer rod and a special caulking or sealant at the surface of the groove.

== Portable heated snow mats for consumers ==
Within the past few years, heated snow melting mats have become available to retail consumers. These plug into a water-resistant electrical outlet, and can be laid on walkways, driveways, stairways, wheelchair ramps, and loading docks.

These heated mats consist of two layers of slip-resistant rubber with an intervening heating element, and can melt snow and ice in hours or minutes (depending on heat level and snow level). The mats turn on below a preset temperature with an optional inline thermostat.

== See also ==
- Hypocaust
- Smart highway
- Snowmelter
- Trace heating
