= Snowmass Village, Colorado =

Town in Colorado, United States

- Home rule town
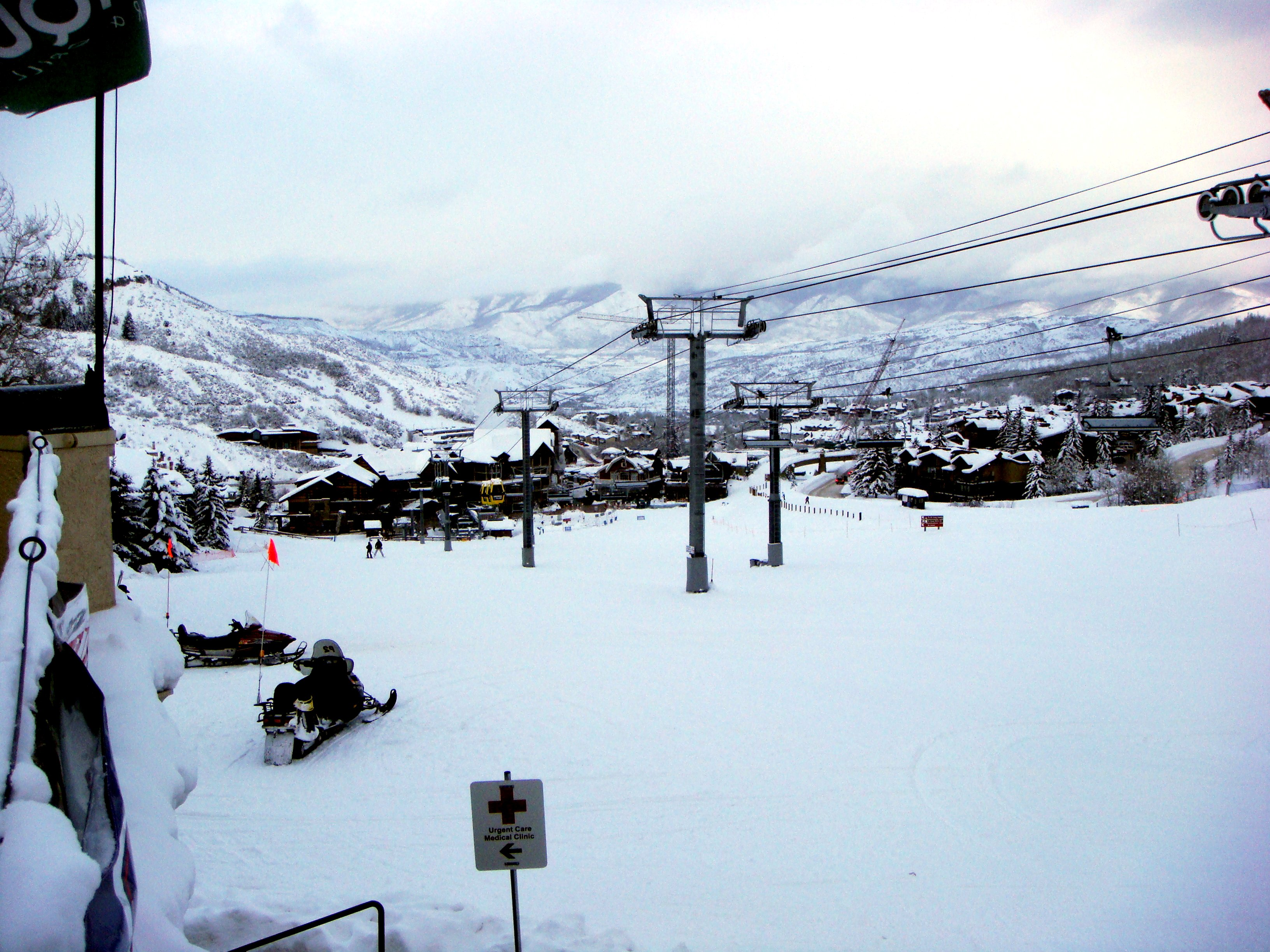

- Location of Snowmass Village in Pitkin County, Colorado.
- Coordinates: 39°14′45″N 106°56′12″W
- Country: United States
- State: Colorado
- County: Pitkin
- Settled: About 1910
- Incorporated: 1977

Government
  - Type: Home rule municipality

Area
  - Total: 27.86 sq mi (72.17 km^{2})
  - Land: 27.78 sq mi (71.95 km^{2})
  - Water: 0.081 sq mi (0.21 km^{2})
- Elevation: 8,309 ft (2,533 m)

Population (2020)
  - Total: 3,096
  - Density: 111.4/sq mi (43.03/km^{2})
- Time zone: UTC-7 (Mountain (MST))
  - Summer (DST): UTC-6 (MDT)
- ZIP code: 81615 (PO Box)
- Area code: 970
- FIPS code: 08-71755
- GNIS feature ID: 2413302
- Website: tosv.com

Snowmass Village is a home rule municipality in Pitkin County, Colorado, United States. The population was 3,096 at the 2020 census. A popular winter resort location for skiing and snowboarding, the town is well known as the location of the Snowmass ski area, the largest of the four nearby ski areas operated collectively as Aspen/Snowmass. In 2010, the accidental discovery by a bulldozer operator of fossilized elements of a Pleistocene ecosystem in the ice age lake bed at the Ziegler Reservoir (commonly referred to as the Snowmastodon site) put Snowmass Village prominently on the paleontological map of North America.

== History ==
The Brush Creek Valley was settled circa 1910 by ranching families including: Sinclair, Melton, Stapleton, and Hoaglund. As a child, Hilder Hoaglund would ride her horse into Aspen to go to school. Her father, Charles Hoaglund, immigrated from Sweden in the 1800s. After a school was built in Brush Creek valley, she attended the Brush Creek Frontier School, now called the Little Red Schoolhouse, located on Owl Creek Road. She became a teacher at that school and then at the Red Brick School in Aspen. At the schoolhouse, she played the accordion or piano for community dances. When she married Bill Anderson, the Hoaglund Ranch became the Anderson Ranch.

Paul Soldner, a ceramic artist noted for developing American Raku, established a studio in the Anderson Ranch buildings in 1966. He founded the Anderson Ranch Arts Center and incorporated it into a non-profit in 1973. The Anderson Ranch Arts Center on Owl Creek Road uses many of the original buildings from the Hoaglund Ranch, although not in their original location, farther down stream on what is now Snowmass Club Circle.

Under the leadership of Bill Janss and DRC Brown, the American Cement Company developed Snowmass Village as a ski resort starting in 1966.* Hayfields were subdivided and the lots sold for houses. Brush Creek is an unappealing name for a ski area, so they named the resort Snowmass after the valley to the west of Brush Creek. Fritz Benidict acted as the architect of the Snowmass ski area. The Campground Chairlift serving the western edge of the ski area, actually does extend into the Snowmass Valley. Five chairlifts were installed: Fanny Hill, Burlingame, and Sam's Knob, the Big Burn, and Campground.

The Snowmass ski area first opened on December 16, 1967. The new ski area hired Olympic medalist Stein Eriksen to direct the ski school. Besides experience as a skier and instructor, Stein Eriksen brought an aura of European glamor to the raw new resort.

Brush Creek Road was paved in 1968. The former hayfields still had mostly alfalfa into the 1970s. The Snowmass Golf Course was first laid out with nine holes in (need date). It was expanded and redesigned several times (need dates), the latest in 2001 by James Engh. The periodic re-landscaping of the golf course led to the relocation of ranch houses and to changes in the valley floor from flat or sloping fields to rolling hills with ponds.

The Snowmass Wildcat Fire Protection District was founded in 1971 and the firehouse built on Owl Creek Road.

Notorious serial killer Ted Bundy abducted and murdered Caryn Campbell in Snowmass Village on January 12, 1975. Her body was later found along the Owl Creek road near what is now the Facilities Maintenance Division. In 1977, the community incorporated as the Town of Snowmass Village.

The Snowmass Chapel was built near the firehouse on Owl Creek Road in 1988. Previous to this time, church services were held in the Opticon Movie Theater or in the open air Aspen Grove Chapel, where benches were set up under aspen trees separating two ski runs. Later the area was cleared for more condominiums off Wood Road.

Today, Snowmass Village has experienced a building boom, as new condominiums, luxury homes, mountainside mansions, and Base Village have recently been constructed. Westin Hotels and the Viceroy Hotel Group have recently built a respective hotel in Snowmass. Snowmass Village is also experiencing a rising influx of wealthy tourists and skiers.

== Geography ==
According to the United States Census Bureau, the town has a total area of 25.6 square miles (66 km^{2}), of which 25.5 square miles (66 km^{2}) is land and 0.1 square miles (0.26 km^{2}) (0.35%) is water.

Snowmass Village is to the north and at the base of the Snowmass Ski Area. It is located on Brush Creek, not Snowmass Creek. Within the area of the town, Owl Creek and Brush Creek join and then flow north into the Roaring Fork River. Visible from the village from east to west are Burnt Mountain Ridge, Burnt Mountain, Baldy Mountain, Chapel Peak, Garret Peak, Clark Peak, Mount Daly, and Capitol Peak. Neither Snowmass Mountain nor Snowmass Peak, at the headwaters of Snowmass Creek, are visible from Snowmass Village.

The geologic unit Mancos Shale underlies most of the area. On slopes too steep for vegetation, this shale is visible as gray expanses of eroding bedrock. On south-facing slopes, the alkaline soil that develops from the shales supports Gambel oak, sagebrush, serviceberry, and chokecherry. The north-facing slopes feature aspen, subalpine fir, Douglas fir, Engelmann spruce, and blue spruce.

The area around Snowmass Village has abundant wildlife including black bears which feed on the acorns and berries of the south-facing slopes.

== Demographics ==
Historical population
Census	Pop.	Note	%±
1980	999		—
1990	1,449		45.0%
2000	1,822		25.7%
2010	2,826		55.1%
2020	3,096		9.6%
U.S. Decennial Census

=== 2020 census ===
As of the 2020 census, Snowmass Village had a population of 3,096. The median age was 41.4 years. 17.7% of residents were under the age of 18 and 17.8% of residents were 65 years of age or older. For every 100 females there were 108.9 males, and for every 100 females age 18 and over there were 114.9 males age 18 and over.

76.7% of residents lived in urban areas, while 23.3% lived in rural areas.

There were 1,388 households in Snowmass Village, of which 25.5% had children under the age of 18 living in them. Of all households, 42.1% were married-couple households, 29.3% were households with a male householder and no spouse or partner present, and 20.1% were households with a female householder and no spouse or partner present. About 30.5% of all households were made up of individuals and 9.4% had someone living alone who was 65 years of age or older.

There were 2,601 housing units, of which 46.6% were vacant. The homeowner vacancy rate was 1.9% and the rental vacancy rate was 8.0%.

Racial composition as of the 2020 census
Race	Number	Percent
White	2,711	87.6%
Black or African American	23	0.7%
American Indian and Alaska Native	5	0.2%
Asian	41	1.3%
Native Hawaiian and Other Pacific Islander	1	0.0%
Some other race	101	3.3%
Two or more races	214	6.9%
Hispanic or Latino (of any race)	261	8.4%

== Education ==
It is divided between the two school districts that have portions of Pitkin County: Aspen School District 1 and Roaring Fork School District RE-1.

The Aspen district's comprehensive high school is Aspen High School.

== See also ==
- Snowmass Ski Area
- Snowmastodon site
