= Snowmass Creek =

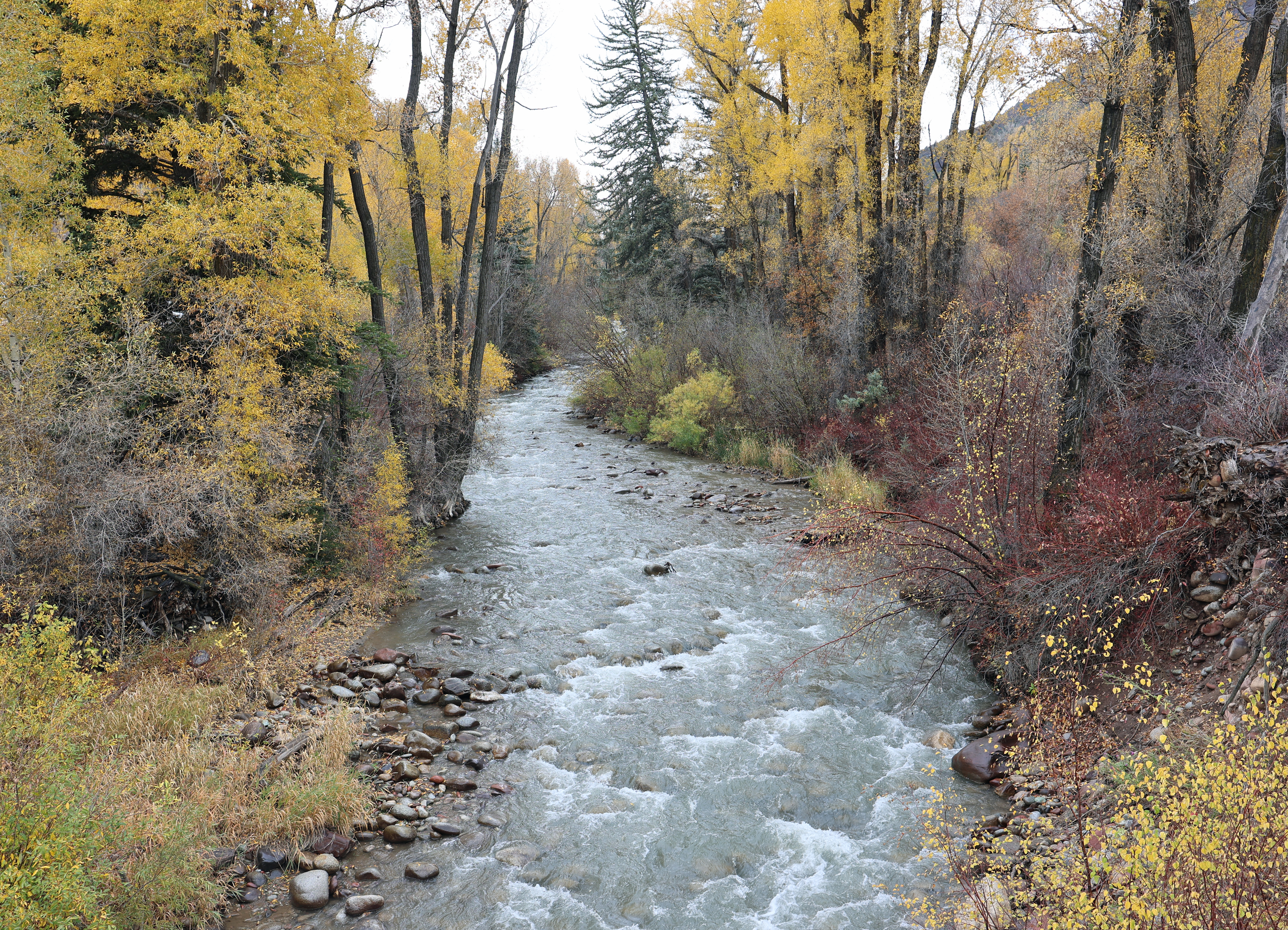
- The creek just before it passes under Highway 82 and its confluence with the Roaring Fork River

- The location of the creek's mouth in Colorado

Physical characteristics
- Source
  - location: Near Maroon Peak
  - coordinates: 39°4′37.96″N 106°59′55.16″W
- Mouth
  - location: Snowmass, Colorado
  - coordinates: 39°19′54.94″N 106°59′10.16″W
  - elevation: 6,841 feet (2,085 meters)
- Length: 23 miles (37 kilometers).

Basin features
- Progression: Roaring Fork → Colorado
- Tributaries
  - left: Bear Creek; Copper Creek; West Snowmass Creek; Hunter Creek; Wildcat Creek; Capitol Creek
  - right: East Snowmass Creek; Wildcat Creek

Snowmass Creek is a tributary of the Roaring Fork River in Pitkin County, Colorado.

== Course ==
The creek rises north of the Maroon Bells in the White River National Forest. From there, it travels generally north, losing some of its flow to ditch diversions, and finally passing under State Highway 82 to its confluence with the Roaring Fork River just north of the highway at the community of Snowmass, Colorado.

== See also ==
- List of rivers of Colorado
