= Tidal flooding =

Temporary inundation of low-lying areas during exceptionally high tide events

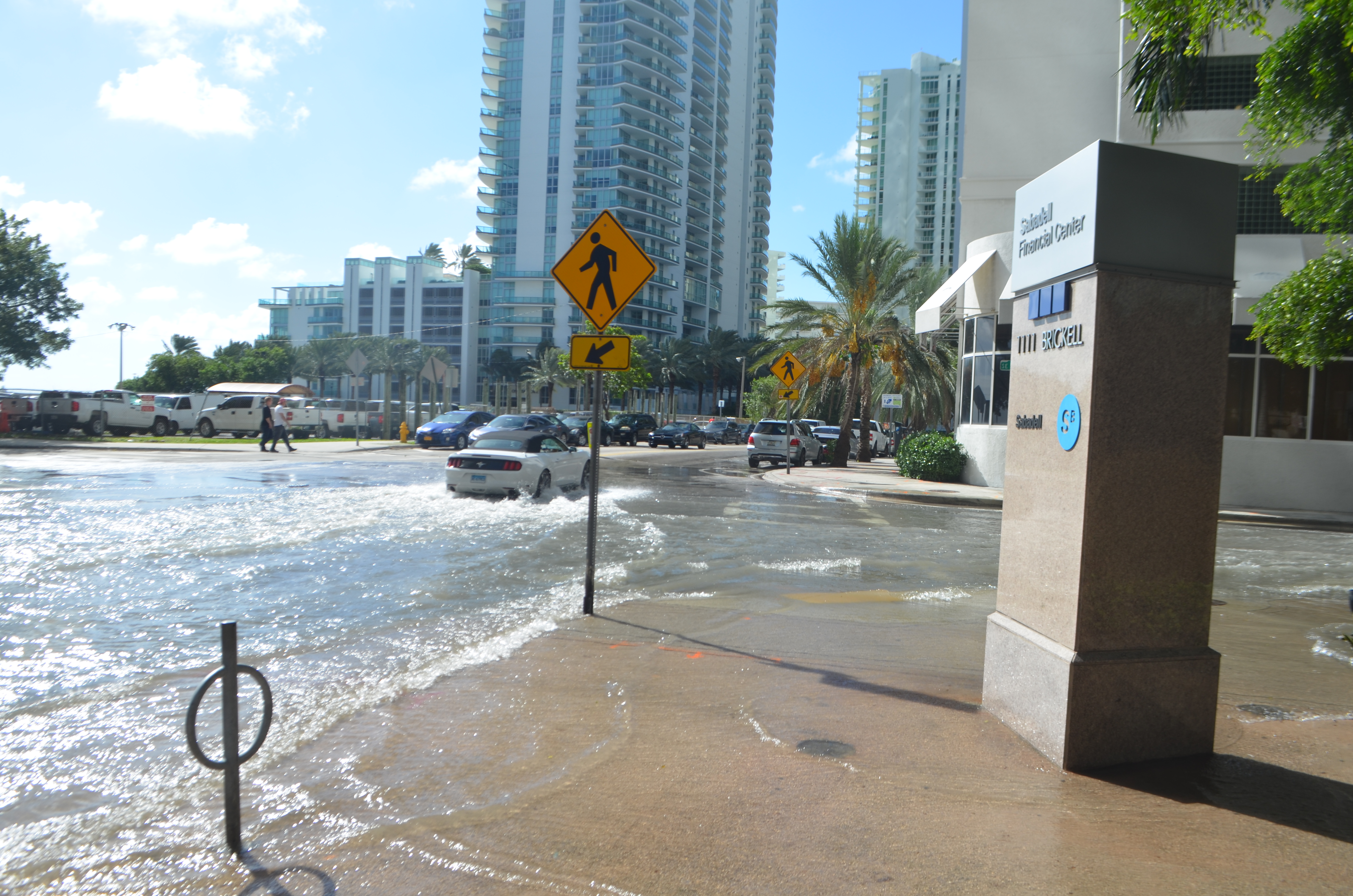
October 17, 2016 tidal flooding on a sunny day, during the "king tides" in Brickell, Miami that peaked at 4 ft MLLW.

Tidal flooding, also known as sunny day flooding or nuisance flooding, is the temporary inundation of low-lying areas, especially streets, during exceptionally high tide events, such as at full and new moons. The highest tides of the year may be known as the king tide, with the month varying by location. These kinds of floods tend not to be a high risk to property or human safety, but further stress coastal infrastructure in low-lying areas.

This kind of flooding is becoming more common in cities and other human-occupied coastal areas as sea level rise associated with climate change and other human-related environmental impacts such as coastal erosion and land subsidence increase the vulnerability of infrastructure. Geographies faced with these issues can utilize coastal management practices to mitigate the effects in some areas, but increasingly these kinds of floods may develop into coastal flooding that requires managed retreat or other more extensive climate change adaptation practices are needed for vulnerable areas.

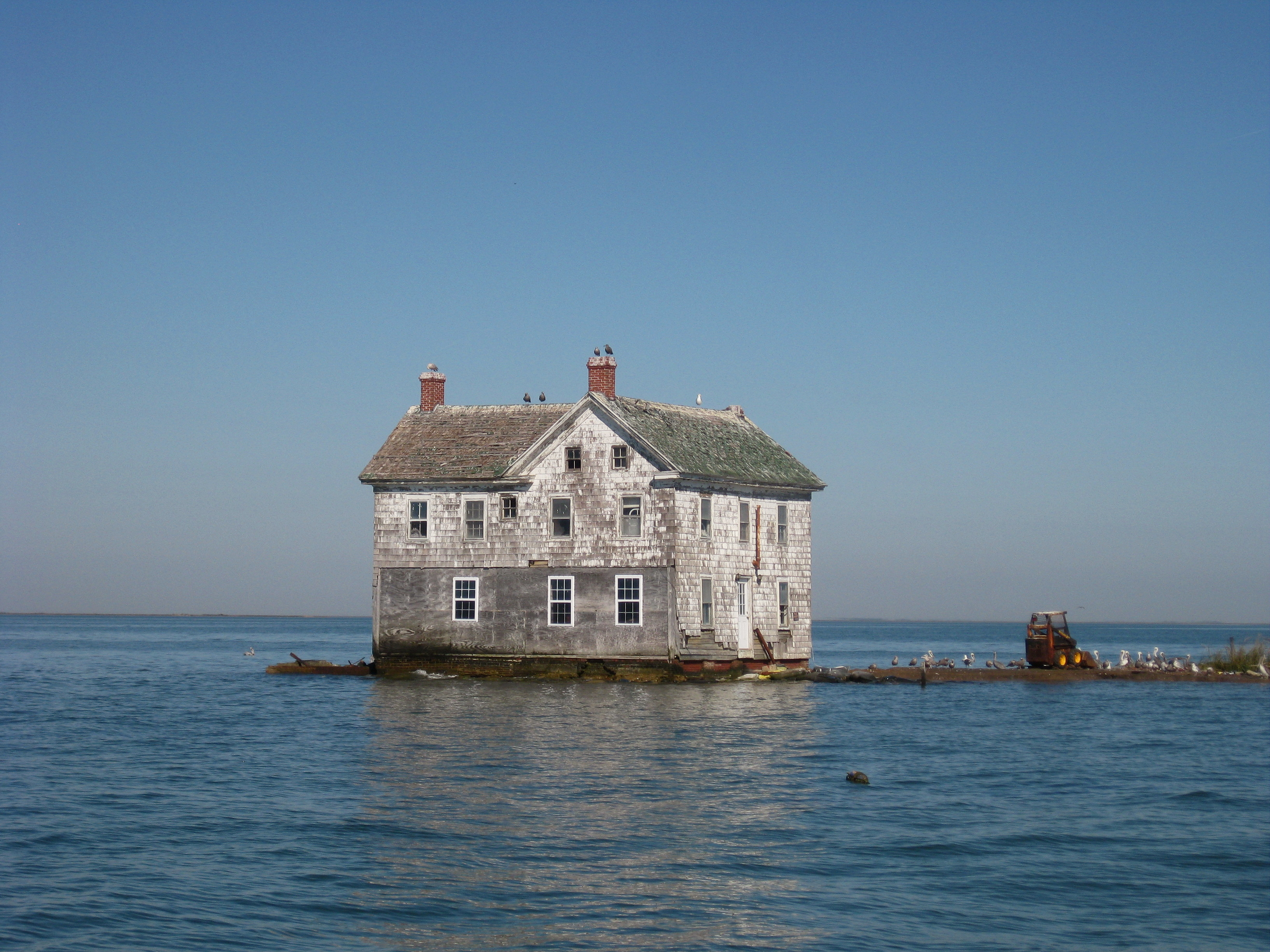
The last remaining house on Holland Island that collapsed and was torn down in the 2010s as erosion and tides reached the foundation.

== Effects on infrastructure ==
Tidal flooding is capable of greatly inhibiting natural gravity-based drainage systems in low-lying areas when it reaches levels that are below visible inundation of the surface, but which are high enough to incapacitate the lower drainage or sewer system. Thus, even normal rainfall or storm surge events can cause greatly amplified flooding effects. One passive solution to intrusion through drainage systems are one way back-flow valves in drainage ways. However, while this may prevent a majority of the tidal intrusion, it also inhibits drainage during exceptionally high tides that shut the valves. In Miami Beach, where resilience work is underway, the pump systems replace insufficient gravity-based systems.

== Relation to climate change ==
Sunny day flooding is often associated with coastal regions, where sea level rise attributed to global warming can send water into the streets on days with elevated high tides. Further, regions with glaciers also experience sunny day flooding as climate change alters the dynamics of glacier meltwater. Abnormally hot temperatures not only swell rivers and creeks directly through accelerated snowmelt, but can burst ice dams and cause water from glacial lakes to swell waterways less predictably.

A warming climate causes physical changes to the types of ice on a glacier. As glaciers retreat, there is less firn (water-retaining snow) so that more meltwater runs directly into the watershed over deeper, impervious glacial ice.

== Affected geographies ==
=== United States ===
High tide flooding, also called tidal flooding, has become much more common in the past seven decades.

Adaptation measures for tidal flooding, such as sea walls and building up roadway heights, are predicted to last only a few decades.

The number of floods declared to be disasters by the Federal Emergency Management Agency (FEMA) has increased, especially since 2010.

Most of the coastal communities in the Eastern Seaboard of the United States are vulnerable to this kind of flooding as sea level rise increases.

Due to changing geography such as subsidence, and poorly planned development, tidal flooding may exist separate from modern nuisance flooding associated with sea level rise and anthropocentric climate change. The widely publicized Holland Island in Maryland for example has disappeared over the years mainly due to subsidence and coastal erosion. In the New Orleans area on the Gulf Coast of Louisiana, land subsidence results in the Grand Isle tide gauge showing an extreme upward sea level trend.

==== Florida ====
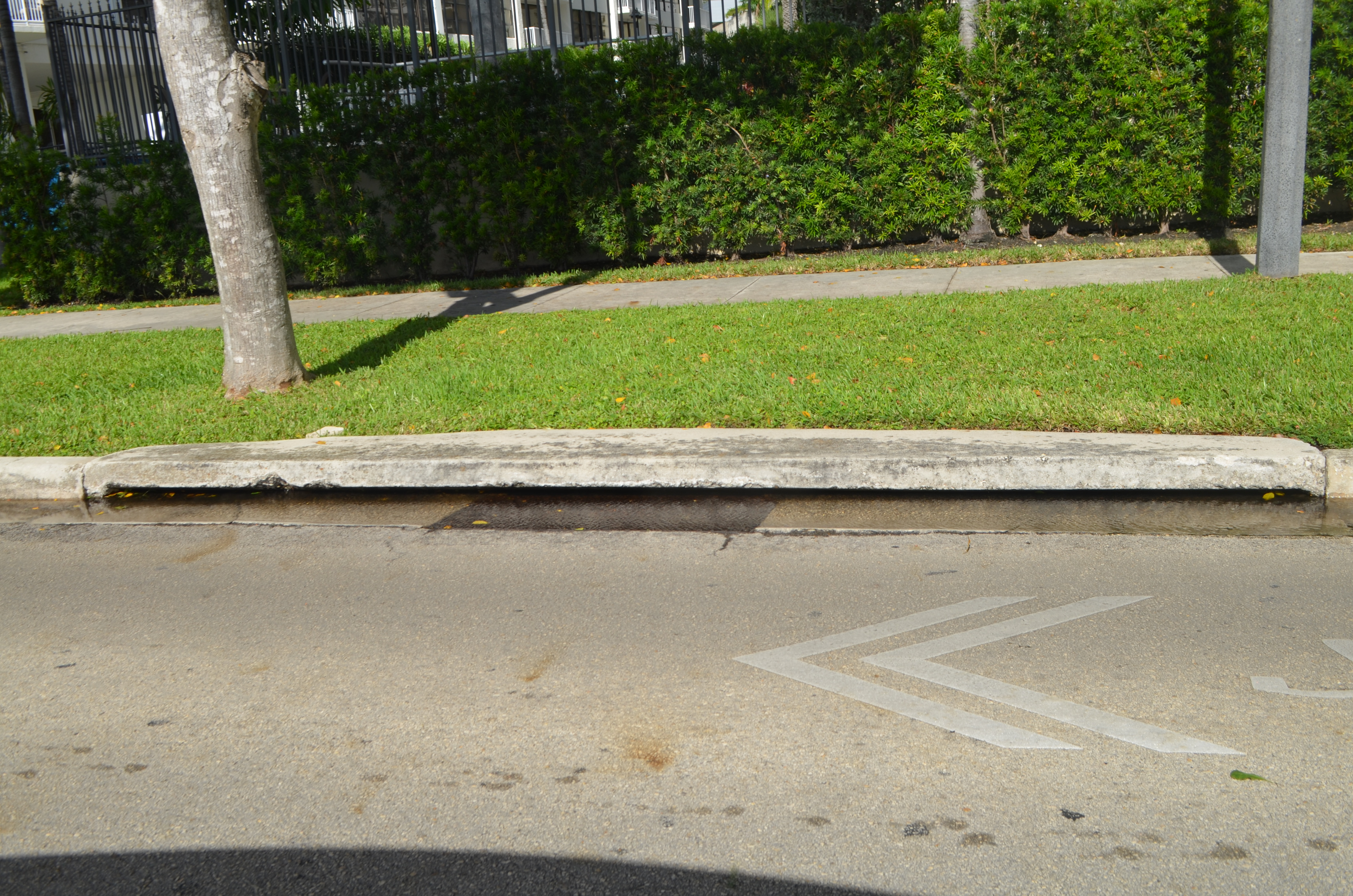
Saltwater in drain on a bayfront street (Brickell Bay Drive) in Miami just up to street level; while not a direct flood, this inhibits normal passive, gravity-based drainage.

In Florida, controversy arose when state-level government mandated that the term "nuisance flooding" and other terms be used in place of terms such as sea level rise, climate change and global warming, prompting allegations of climate change denial, specifically against Governor Rick Scott. This amid Florida, specifically South Florida and the Miami metropolitan area being one of the most at risk areas in the world for the potential effects of sea level rise, and where the frequency and severity of tidal flooding events increased in the 21st century. The issue is more bipartisan in South Florida, particularly in places like Miami Beach, where a several hundred million dollar project is underway to install more than 50 pumps and physically raise roads to combat the flooding, mainly along the west side of South Beach, formerly a mangrove wetland where the average elevation is less than one meter (3.3 feet).

In the Miami metropolitan area, where the vast majority of the land is below 10 ft (3.0 m), even a one-foot increase over the average high tide can cause widespread flooding. The 2015 and 2016 king tide event levels reached about 4 feet (1.2 m) MLLW, 3 feet (0.9 m) above mean sea level, or about 2 ft (0.61 m) NAVD88, and nearly the same above MHHW. While the tide range is very small in Miami, averaging about 2 ft (0.61 m), with the greatest range being less than 2 m (6.6 ft), the area is very acute to minute differences down to single inches due to the vast area at low elevation. NOAA tide gauge data for most stations shows current water level graphs relative to a fixed vertical datum, as well as mean sea level trends for some stations. During the king tides, the local Miami area tide gauge at Virginia Key shows levels running at times 1 foot (0.30 m) or more over datum.

Fort Lauderdale has installed over one hundred tidal valves since 2013 to combat flooding. Fort Lauderdale is nicknamed the "Venice of America" due to its roughly 165 miles (266 km) of canals.

A recent University of Florida study correlated the increased tidal flooding in south Florida, at least from 2011–2015 to episodic atmospheric conditions. The rate was about three-quarters of an inch (19 mm) per year, versus the global rate of just over one-tenth of an inch (2.5 mm) per year.

== See also ==
- Acqua alta, tidal peaks in the northern Adriatic Sea which cause flooding in the Venetian Lagoon
