= Ulman Owens =

American lighthouse keeper

Ulman Owens (1878 - March 11, 1931) was an American lighthouse keeper. He is chiefly remembered today for the mysterious circumstances surrounding his death. Owens became a lighthouse keeper in 1911, and served much of his career at the Holland Island Bar Light; little else is known of his life.

== Early life ==
Ulman Owens was born as "Royal Ulman Owens" in Somerset County, Maryland on April 24, 1878. He was the oldest son of Samuel J. & Priscilla (née White) Owens. He married twice, both in Somerset County:

1) Ella Harding in 1899. They had two children: Mildred G. Owens (b. 1901) and Sicci G. Owens (b. 1904). Ella died on May 10, 1908.

2) Lucy H. Bounds on May 19, 1909. They had two children: Murdice L. Owens (b. 1914) and Ella O. Owens (b. 1916). Lucy died on June 29, 1923.

He was raised as a waterman until joining the U.S. Lighthouse Service in 1911.

== Death ==
On March 11, 1931, Henry Sterling, keeper of the Solomons Lump Light, noticed that the light at Holland Island Bar was not lit. Having no radio, he had to wait until he was able to flag down a passing ship for help. Sterling eventually attracted the attention of the crew of the Winnie and Estelle, whose first mate, H. J. Garner, agreed to go out to the lighthouse and investigate. Garner was soon joined by oyster boat captain John Tawes Tyler; together, the two men soon reached the lighthouse. They were met with a horrible scene.

Owens lay dead in the kitchen, which was in disarray; it appeared that there had been some sort of fight. Blood stains were in evidence all around the room, and there was a bloody butcher's knife near the body. The dead man, however, bore evidence only of scraping and bruising, with no gunshot or stab wounds visible.

== Investigation ==
Investigators found that Owens had been unwell in the days before his death. The inquest ruled that the keeper had suffered some sort of fit, which killed him. However, on the night of the murder, a local captain saw a vessel cruising without running lights; presumably, this was some sort of rum runner. The boat's wake led directly back to the lighthouse. A later autopsy complicated matters still further, revealing that Owens had suffered a cracked skull. And a federal agent would later testify that he overheard a suspected rum runner, Guy Parkhurst, say, "There go the rats that turned us in. Well, the lighthouse keeper got in the headlines. We did that. What these rats get will be worse."

Owens was also a known womanizer, who counted among his lovers two women who had left their husbands. Some felt that one of these jilted men may have killed the keeper. In the event, the autopsy revealed an enlarged heart, suggesting that Owens had suffered from heart disease. The verdict of natural causes stood, and the case was closed.
