= Long Island (Maryland) =

Former American island

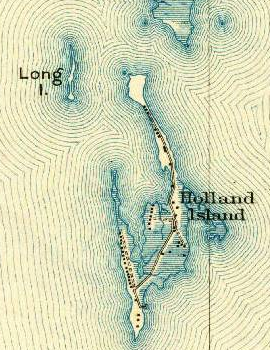
- Map of Long Island and Holland Island from a 1927 Topographic Map
- Interactive map of Long Island

Geography
- Location: Chesapeake Bay
- Coordinates: 38.136°N 76.099°W

Administration
- United States
- State: Maryland

Demographics
- Population: 0

Long Island was an island located in Chesapeake Bay, northwest of another former island, Holland Island. The island was shown on maps up until near 1934, when erosion of nearby islands combined with the rising sea levels caused it to be submerged.
