= Holland Island Bar Light =

Lighthouse in Maryland, United States

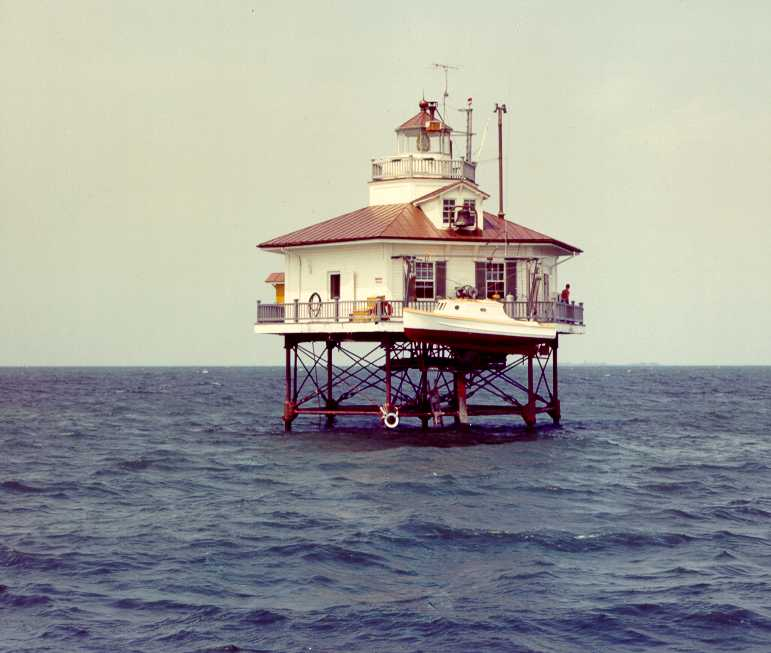
- undated photograph of Holland Island Bar Light (USCG)
- Location: South of Holland Island in the Chesapeake Bay
- Coordinates: 38.0687°N 76.0959°W

Tower
- Constructed: 1889
- Foundation: screw-pile
- Construction: cast-iron/wood
- Shape: square house

Light
- First lit: 1889
- Deactivated: 1960
- Focal height: 11 m (36 ft)
- Lens: fourth-order Fresnel lens
- Range: 12 mi
- Characteristic: 10 sec white flashing

The Holland Island Bar Light was a screw-pile lighthouse in the Chesapeake Bay which existed from 1889 to 1960. It is remembered for the unexplained death of one of its keepers, and for being "attacked" by United States Navy pilots during a training exercise.

== History ==
The lighthouse was built in 1889 south of Holland Island, Maryland, a small fishing community. It was completed for $35,000, and was outfitted with a fourth-order Fresnel lens. In 1905 the Lighthouse Board considered turning the station into one of a pair of range lights, but this plan eventually fell through.

The house was dismantled in 1960; it was replaced by an automated beacon mounted on the original foundation.

=== Death of Ulman Owens ===
On March 31, 1931, keeper Ulman Owens was found dead at the station under mysterious circumstances. Though there was blood and evidence of a struggle, no wounds were found on his body and the death was ruled natural.

=== Friendly-fire incident ===
The lighthouse stood near the hulk of an old ship, the Hannibal, which was frequently used for target practice by Navy fighters. On February 19, 1957, three ADSN Skyraiders from the Naval Air Station at Atlantic City, New Jersey bombed the light; their pilots had mistaken the structure for the hulk of the Hannibal. Three practice rockets hit the light. Although they carried no explosives, they still managed to tear holes in the roof and walls, and damaged several of the iron pilings as well. The keepers called the United States Coast Guard, which sent aid. Although the four men were evacuated, they returned the next day to begin repairs.
