= Hard infrastructure =

Physical components of roads etc

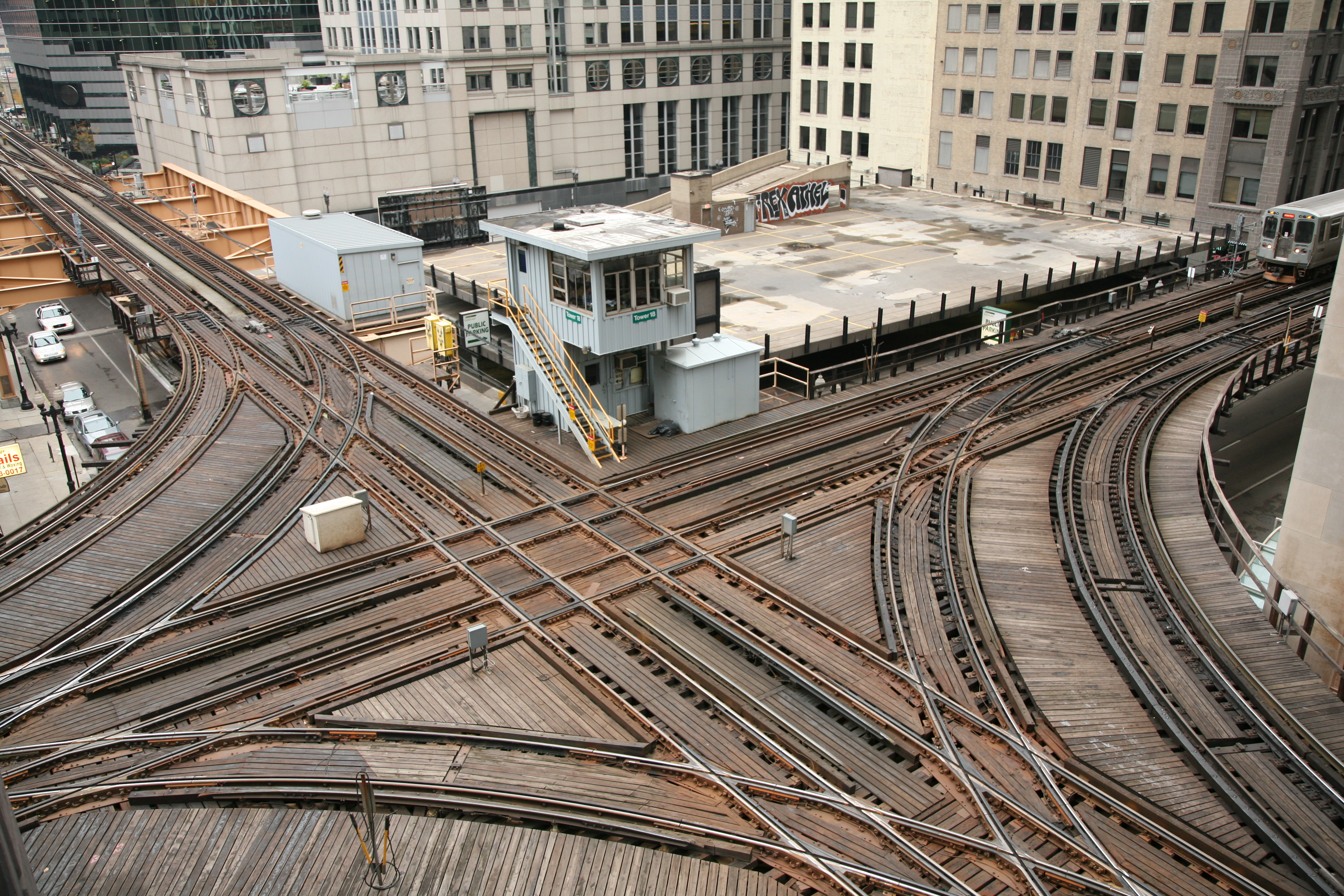
Chicago Transit Authority signal tower 18 on the Chicago 'L'

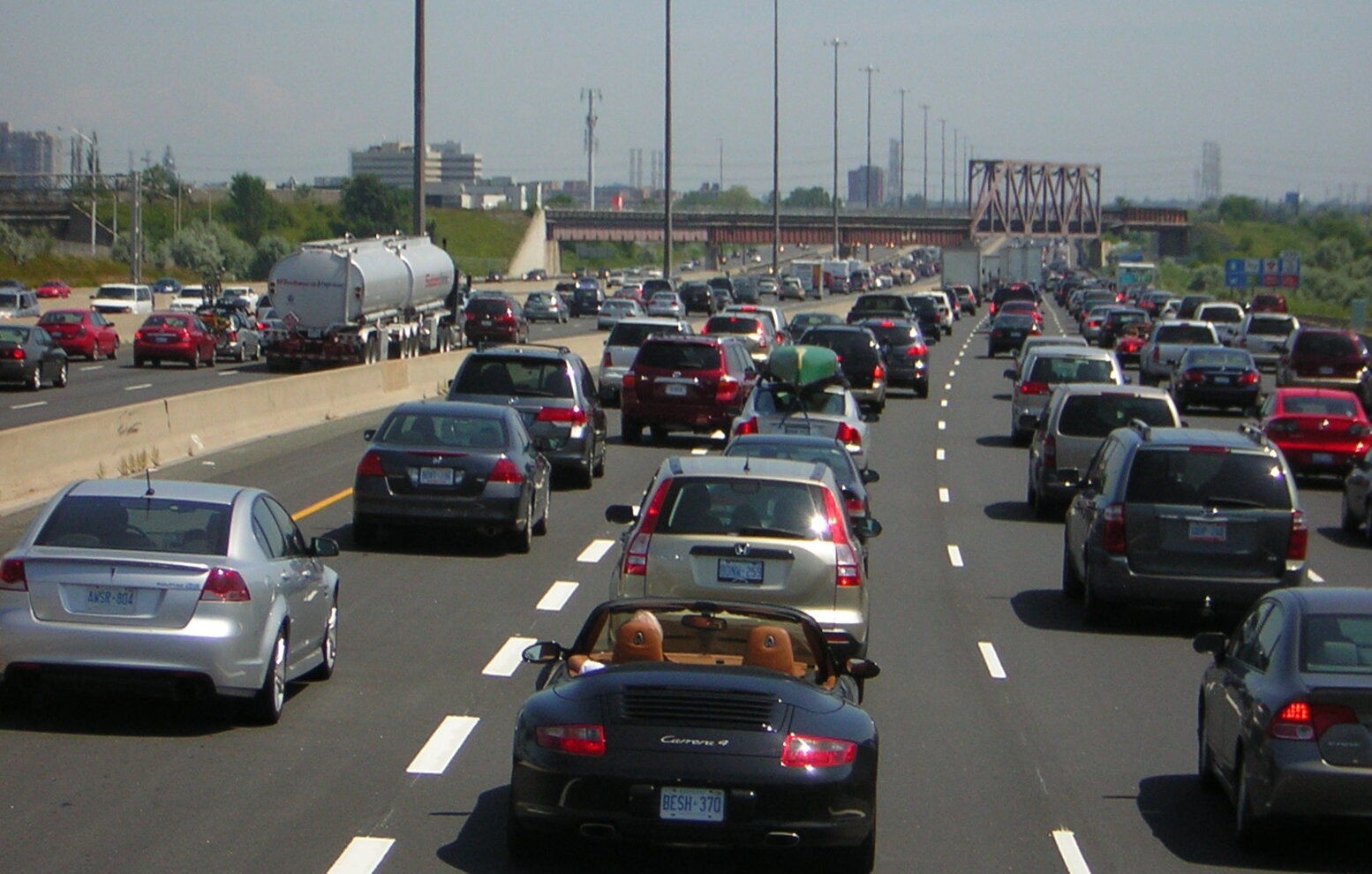
Highway 401 in Toronto, the busiest highway in North America

Hard infrastructure, also known as tangible or built infrastructure, is the physical infrastructure of roads, bridges, tunnels, railways, airports, ports, and harbors, among others, as opposed to the soft infrastructure or "intangible infrastructure of human capital in the form of education, research, health and social services and "institutional infrastructure" in the form of legal, economic and social systems.

This article delineates both the capital goods, or fixed assets, and the control systems, software required to operate, manage and monitor the systems, as well as any accessory buildings - such as airports, plants, or vehicles that are an essential part of the system. Also included are fleets of vehicles operating according to schedules such as public transit buses and garbage collection, as well as basic energy or communications facilities that are not usually part of a physical network, such as oil refineries, radio, and television broadcasting facilities.

== Attributes ==
Hard infrastructure in general usually has the following attributes:

=== Capital assets that provide services ===
These are physical assets that provide services. The people employed in the hard infrastructure sector generally maintain, monitor, and operate the assets, but do not offer services to the clients or users of the infrastructure. Interactions between workers and clients are generally limited to administrative tasks concerning ordering, scheduling, or billing of services.

=== Large networks ===
These are large networks constructed over generations and are not often replaced as a whole system. The network provides services to a geographically defined area, and has a long life because its service capacity is maintained by continual refurbishment or replacement of components as they wear out.

=== Historicity and interdependence ===
The system or network tends to evolve over time as it is continuously modified, improved, enlarged, and as various components are rebuilt, decommissioned or adapted to other uses. The system components are interdependent and not usually capable of subdivision or separate disposal, and consequently are not readily disposable within the commercial marketplace. The system interdependency may limit a component life to a lesser period than the expected life of the component itself.

=== Natural monopoly ===
The systems tend to be natural monopolies, insofar that economies of scale means that multiple agencies providing a service are less efficient than would be the case if a single agency provided the service. This is because the assets have a high initial cost and a value that is difficult to determine. Once most of the system is built, the marginal cost of servicing additional clients or users tends to be relatively inexpensive, and may be negligible if there is no need to increase the peak capacity or the geographical extent of the network.

In public economics theory, infrastructure assets such as highways and railways tend to be public goods, in that they carry a high degree of non-excludability, where no household can be excluded from using it, and non-rivalry, where no household can reduce another from enjoying it. These properties lead to externality, free ridership, and spillover effects that distort perfect competition and market efficiency. Hence, government becomes the best actor to supply the public goods.

== Transportation ==
Transportation infrastructures such as canals, railways, highways, airways and pipelines include the following:

- road and highway networks, including structures (bridges, tunnels, culverts, retaining walls), signage and markings, electrical systems (street lighting and traffic lights), edge treatments (kerbs, footpaths, landscaping) and specialised facilities such as road maintenance depots and rest areas
- mass transit systems (commuter rail systems, subways, light rail, ferries, trams, city bicycle sharing systems, city car sharing systems and bus transportation)
- railways, including track, structures, terminal facilities (rail yards, railway stations), bridges, level crossings, signalling, and communications systems
- canals and navigable waterways requiring continuous maintenance (dredging, etc.)
- seaports and lighthouses
- airports, including air navigational systems
- bicycle paths and pedestrian walkways, including pedestrian bridges, pedestrian underpasses and other specialised structures for cyclists and pedestrians.

== Energy ==
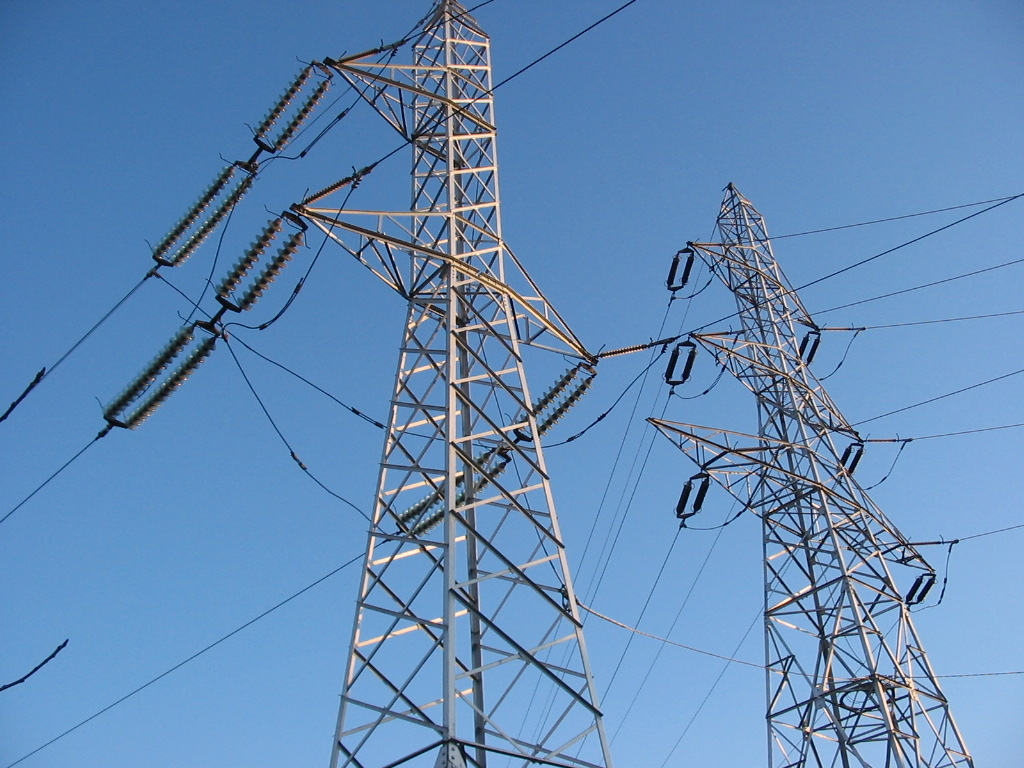
Transmission lines in Romania.

The OECD classifies coal mines, oil wells and natural gas wells as part of the mining sector, and power generation as part of the industrial sector of the economy, not part of infrastructure.

- Electrical power network, including generation plants, electrical grid, substations, and local distribution.
- Natural gas pipelines, storage and distribution terminals, as well as the local distribution network. Some definitions may include the gas wells, as well as the fleets of ships and trucks transporting liquefied gas.
- Petroleum pipelines, including associated storage and distribution terminals. Some definitions may include the oil wells, refineries, as well as the fleets of tanker ships and trucks.
- Specialised coal handling facilities for washing, storing, and transporting coal. Some definitions may include Coal mines.
- Steam or hot water production and distribution networks for district heating systems.
- Electric vehicle networks for charging electric vehicles.

== Water management ==
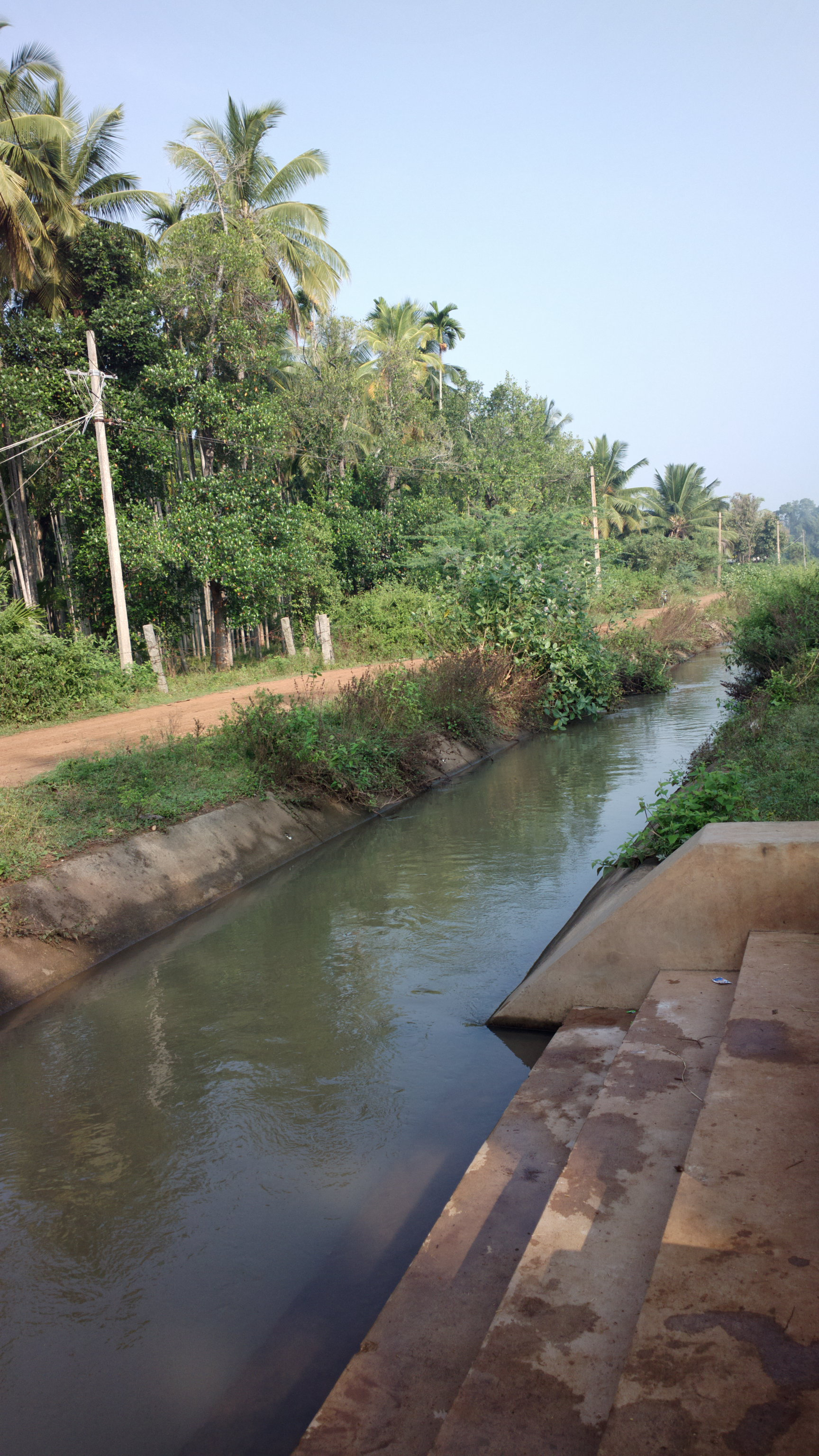
Irrigation canal near Channagiri, Davangere District, India

- Drinking water supply, including the system of pipes, storage reservoirs, pumps, valves, filtration and treatment equipment and meters, including buildings and structures to house the equipment, used for the collection, treatment and distribution of drinking water
- Sewage collection, and disposal of waste water
- Drainage systems (storm sewers, ditches, etc.)
- Major irrigation systems (reservoirs, irrigation canals)
- Major flood control systems (dikes, levees, major pumping stations and floodgates)
- Large-scale snow removal, including fleets of salt spreaders, snow plows, snowblowers, dedicated dump trucks, sidewalk plows, the dispatching and routing systems for these fleets, as well as fixed assets such as snow dumps, snow chutes, snow melters
- Coastal management, including structures such as seawalls, breakwaters, groynes, floodgates, as well as the use of soft engineering techniques such as beach nourishment, sand dune stabilisation and the protection of mangrove forests and coastal wetlands.

== Communications ==
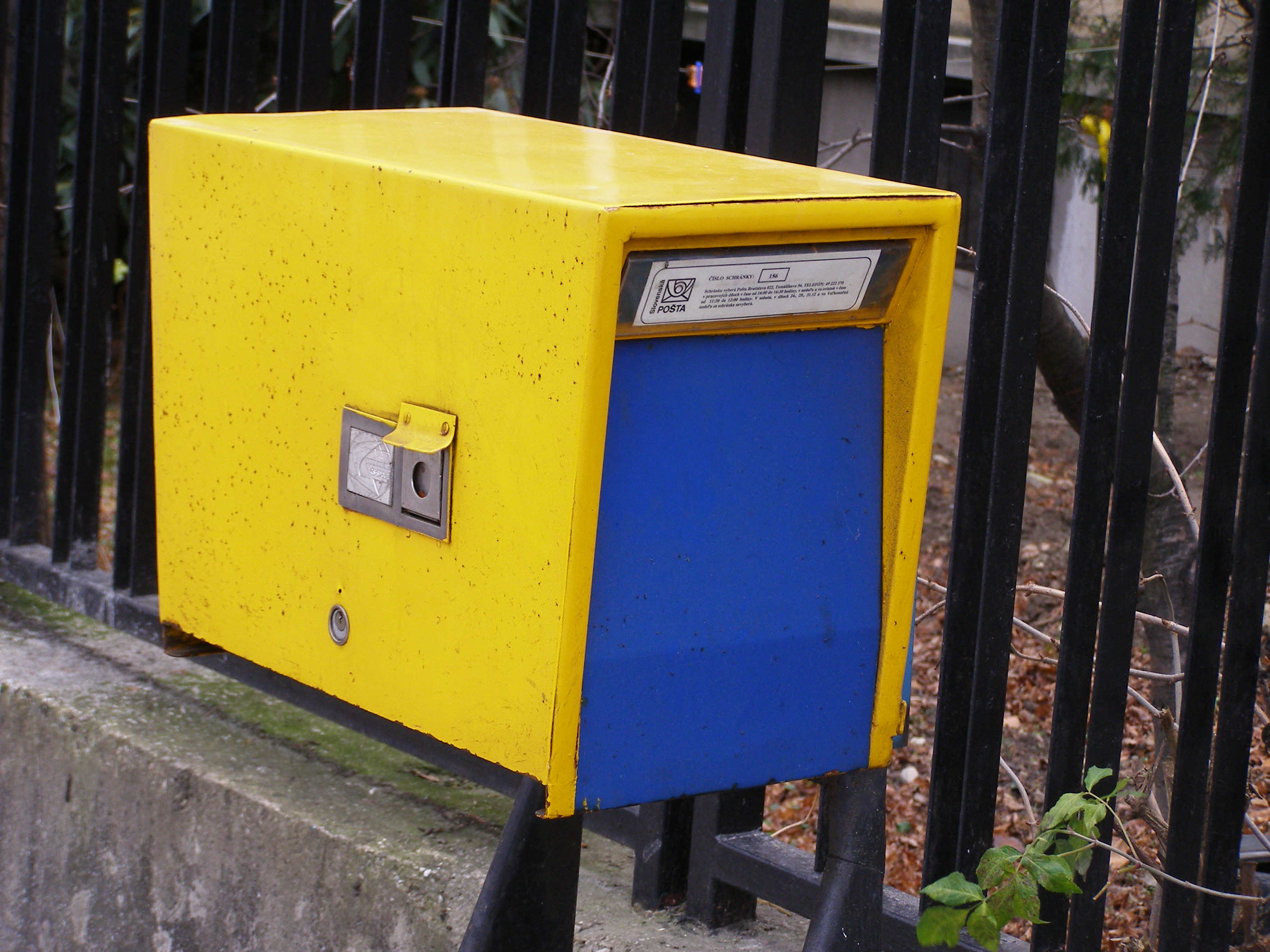
Post box (Slovakia)

OECD lists communications under its economic infrastructure Common Reporting Standard codes.

- Postal service, including sorting facilities
- Telephone networks (land lines) including telephone exchange systems
- Mobile phone networks
- Television and radio transmission stations, including the regulations and standards governing broadcasting
- Cable television physical networks including receiving stations and cable distribution networks (does not include content providers or "cable networks" when used in the sense of a specialised channel such as CNN or MTV)
- The Internet, including the internet backbone, core routers and server farms, local internet service providers as well as the protocols and other basic software required for the system to function (does not include specific websites, although may include some widely used web-based services, such as social network services and web search engines)
- Communications satellites
- Undersea cables
- Major private, government or dedicated telecommunications networks, such as those used for internal communication and monitoring by major infrastructure companies, by governments, by the military or by emergency services, as well as national research and education networks
- Pneumatic tube mail distribution networks

== Solid waste management ==
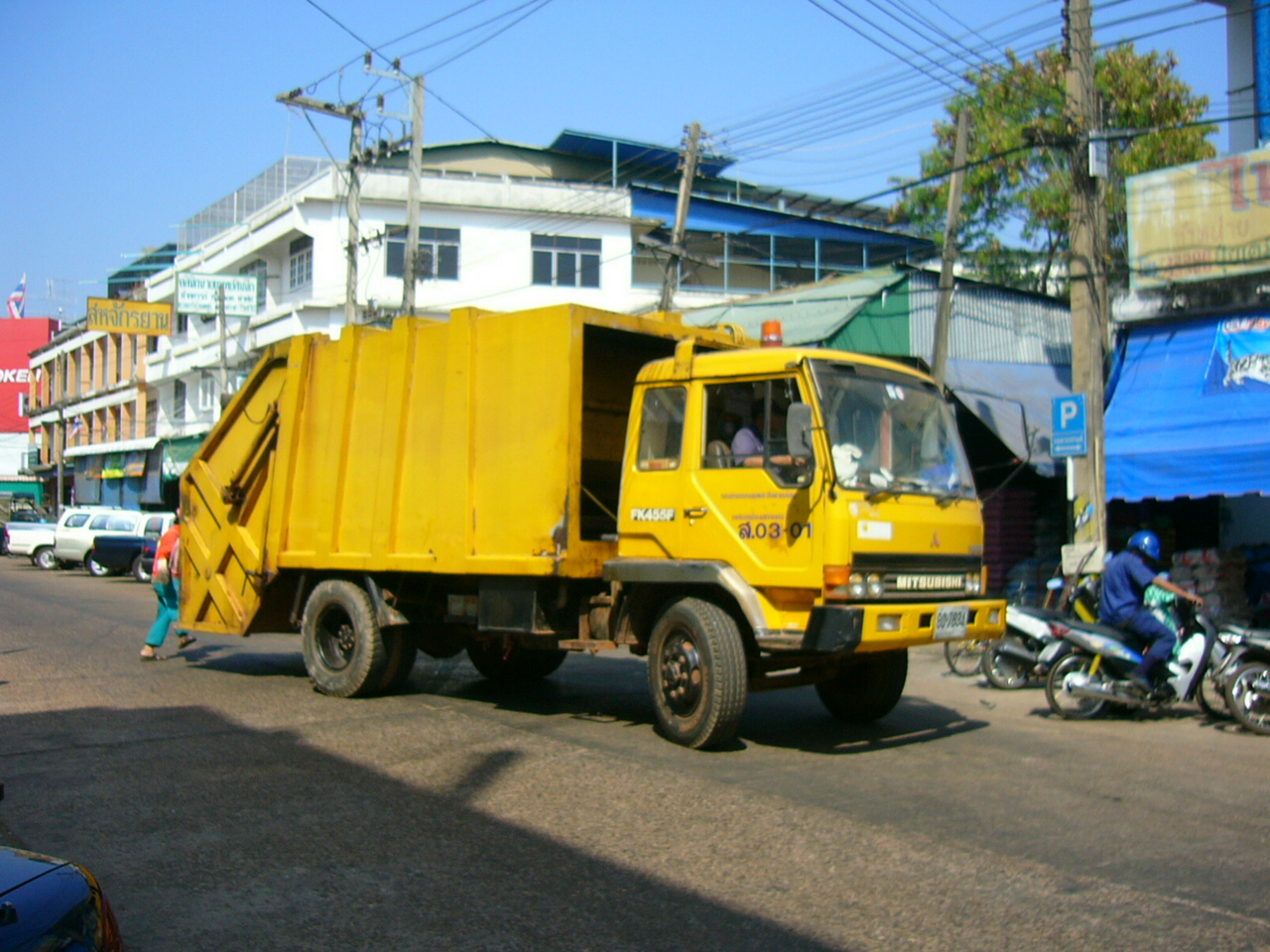
A waste collection vehicle in Sakon Nakhon, Thailand.

- Municipal garbage and recyclables collection
- Solid waste landfills
- Solid waste incinerators and plasma gasification facilities
- Materials recovery facilities
- Hazardous waste disposal facilities

== Earth monitoring and measurement networks ==
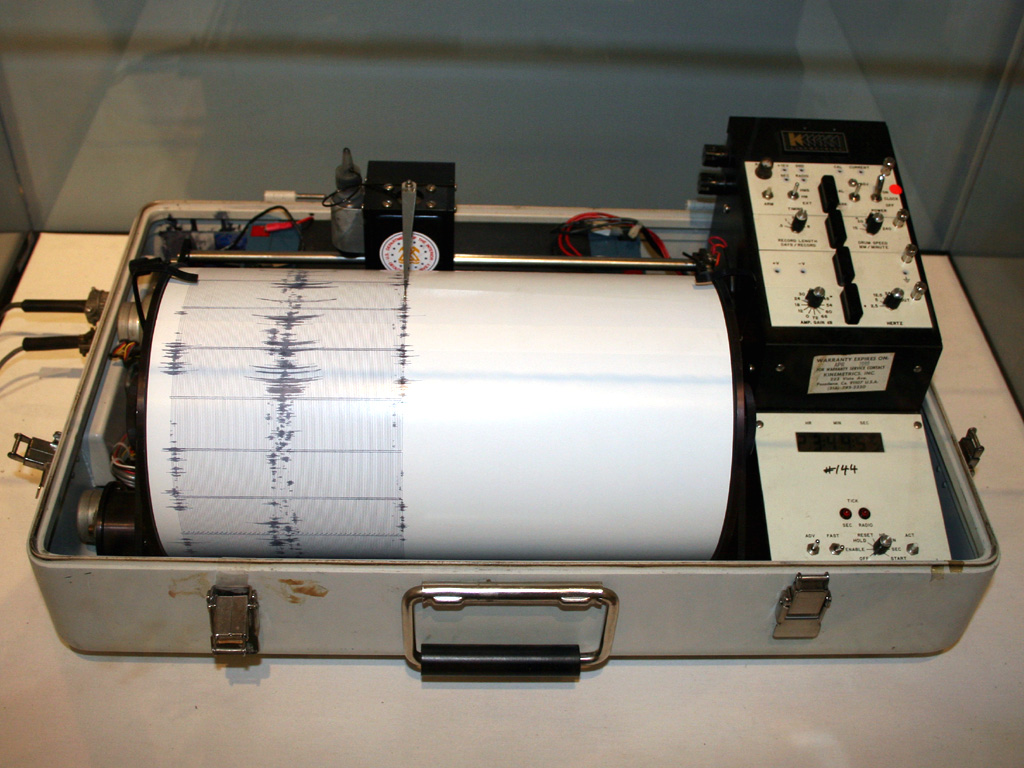
A Kinemetrics seismograph, formerly used by the United States Department of the Interior.

- Meteorological monitoring networks
- Tidal monitoring networks
- Stream gauge or fluviometric monitoring networks
- Seismometer networks
- Earth observation satellites
- Geodetic benchmarks
- Global Positioning System
- Spatial Data Infrastructure

== Bibliography ==
- Larry W. Beeferman, "Pension Fund Investment in Infrastructure: A Resource Paper", Capital Matter (Occasional Paper Series), No.3 December 2008
- A. Eberhard, "Infrastructure Regulation in Developing Countries", PPIAF Working Paper No. 4 (2007) World Bank
- M. Nicolas J. Firzli & Vincent Bazi, “Infrastructure Investments in an Age of Austerity : The Pension and Sovereign Funds Perspective”, published jointly in Revue Analyse Financière, Q4 2011 issue, pp. 34– 37 and USAK/JTW 30 July 2011 (online edition)
- Georg Inderst, "Pension Fund Investment in Infrastructure", OECD Working Papers on Insurance and Private Pensions, No. 32 (2009)
- Ascher, Kate; researched by Wendy Marech (2007). The works: anatomy of a city (Reprint. ed.). New York: Penguin Press. ISBN 978-0143112709.
- Hayes, Brian (2005). Infrastructure: the book of everything for the industrial landscape (1st ed.). New York City: Norton. ISBN 978-0393329599.
- Huler, Scott (2010). On the grid: a plot of land, an average neighborhood, and the systems that make our world work. Emmaus, Penn.: Rodale. ISBN 978-1-60529-647-0.
