= Soft infrastructure =

Services supporting economic and social standards

Soft infrastructure is all the services that are required to maintain the economic, health, cultural and social standards of a population, as opposed to the hard infrastructure, which is the physical infrastructure of roads, bridges etc. It includes both physical assets such as highly specialised buildings and equipment, as well as non-physical assets, such as communication, the body of rules and regulations governing the various systems, the financing of these systems, the systems and organisations by which professionals are trained, advance in their careers by acquiring experience, and are disciplined if required by professional associations. It includes institutions such as the financial and economic systems, the education system, the health care system, the system of government, and law enforcement, and emergency services.

The essence of soft infrastructure is the delivery of specialised services to people. Unlike much of the service sector of the economy, the delivery of those services depends on highly developed systems and large specialised facilities, fleets of specialised vehicles or institutions.

== Governance ==
- The system of government and law enforcement, including the political, legislative, law enforcement, justice and penal systems, as well as specialised facilities (government offices, courthouses, prisons, etc.), and specialised systems for collecting, storing and disseminating data, laws and regulation, such as civil registration, business and company registries, land registration, and maintenance of other government databases.
- Emergency services, such as police, fire protection, and ambulances, including specialised vehicles, buildings, communications and dispatching systems
- Military infrastructure, including military bases, arms depots, training facilities, command centres, communication facilities, major weapons systems, fortifications, specialised arms manufacturing, strategic reserves

== Economic ==
- The financial and economic system, including the banking system, financial institutions, the payment system, international markets, the money supply, financial regulations, as well as accounting standards and regulations
- Major business logistics facilities and systems, including warehouses as well as warehousing and shipping management systems
- Manufacturing infrastructures, including industrial parks and special economic zones, mines and processing plants for basic materials used as inputs in industry, specialised energy, transportation and water infrastructure used by industry, plus the public safety, zoning and environmental laws and regulations that govern and limit industrial activity, and standards organisations
- Agricultural, forestry and fisheries infrastructure, including specialised food and livestock transportation and storage facilities, major feedlots, agricultural price support systems (including agricultural insurance), agricultural health standards, food inspection, experimental farms and agricultural research centres and schools, the system of licensing and quota management, enforcement systems against poaching, forest wardens, and fire fighting

== Social ==
- The health care system, including hospitals, the financing of health care, including health insurance, the systems for regulation and testing of medications and medical procedures, the system for training, inspection and professional discipline of doctors and other medical professionals, public health monitoring and regulations, as well as coordination of measures taken during public health emergencies such as epidemics
- The educational and research system, including elementary and secondary schools, universities, specialised colleges, research institutions, the systems for financing and accrediting educational institutions
- Social welfare systems, including both government support and private charity for the poor, for people in distress or victims of abuse.

== Cultural, sports and recreational ==
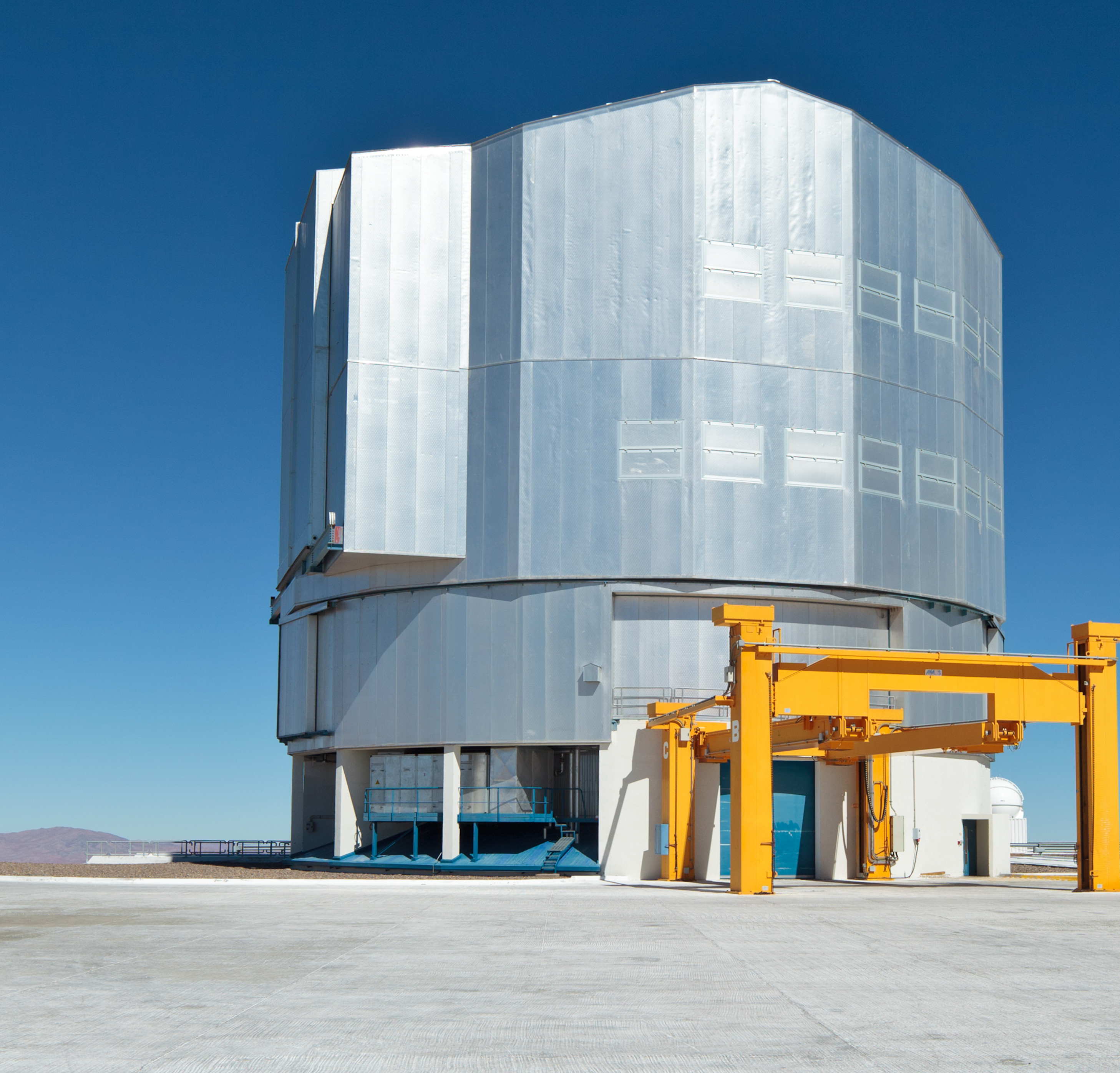
Very Large Telescope.

- Sports and recreational infrastructure, such as parks, sports facilities, the system of sports leagues and associations
- Cultural infrastructure, such as concert halls, museums, libraries, theatres, studios (film studios and recording studios), and specialised training facilities
- Business travel and tourism infrastructure, including both man-made and natural attractions, convention centres, hotels, restaurants, amusement parks, and other services that cater mainly to tourists and business travellers, as well as the systems for informing and attracting tourists, and travel insurance

== Bibliography ==
- Larry W. Beeferman, "Pension Fund Investment in Infrastructure: A Resource Paper", Capital Matter (Occasional Paper Series), No.3 December 2008
- A. Eberhard, "Infrastructure Regulation in Developing Countries", PPIAF Working Paper No. 4 (2007) World Bank
- M. Nicolas J. Firzli & Vincent Bazi, “Infrastructure Investments in an Age of Austerity : The Pension and Sovereign Funds Perspective”, published jointly in Revue Analyse Financière, Q4 2011 issue, pp. 34– 37 and USAK/JTW July 30, 2011 (online edition)
- Georg Inderst, "Pension Fund Investment in Infrastructure", OECD Working Papers on Insurance and Private Pensions, No. 32 (2009)
- Ascher, Kate; researched by Wendy Marech (2007). The works: anatomy of a city (Reprint. ed.). New York: Penguin Press. ISBN 978-0143112709.
- Hayes, Brian (2005). Infrastructure: the book of everything for the industrial landscape (1st ed.). New York City: Norton. ISBN 978-0393329599.
- Huler, Scott (2010). On the grid: a plot of land, an average neighborhood, and the systems that make our world work. Emmaus, Penn.: Rodale. ISBN 978-1-60529-647-0.
