= Holland Island =

Island in the United States of America

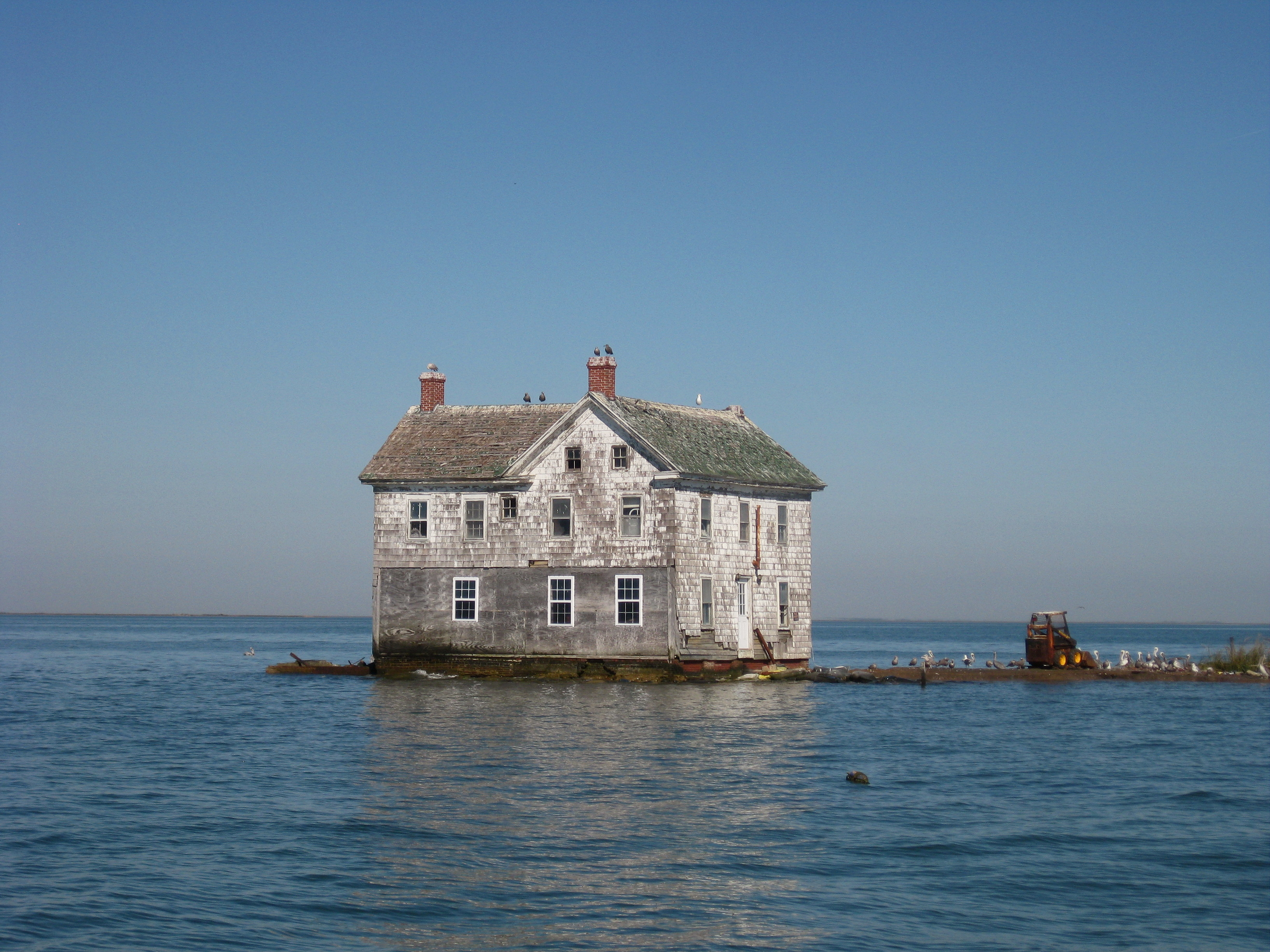
- The last house on Holland Island in October 2009. It fell into the Bay in October 2010.
- Interactive map of Holland Island

Geography
- Location: Chesapeake Bay
- Coordinates: 38°7′12″N 76°5′15″W
- Area: 0.125 sq mi (0.32 km^{2})

Administration
- United States
- State: Maryland

Demographics
- Population: 0

Holland Island is a marshy, rapidly eroding island in the Chesapeake Bay, in Dorchester County, Maryland, west of Salisbury. The island was once inhabited by watermen and farmers but has since been abandoned due to sinking of the land's surface associated with isostatic subsidence and sea level rise. It is located in the Holland Strait, between Bloodsworth Island and Smith Island, six miles west of Wenona, Maryland and Southeast of another former island, Long Island.

== History ==
Holland Island was originally settled in the 1600s, taking its name from early colonist Daniel Holland, the original purchaser of the property from the Dorchester County Sheriff. By 1850, the first community of fishing and farming families developed on the island. By 1910, the island had about 360 residents, making it one of the largest inhabited islands in the Chesapeake Bay. The island community had 70 homes, stores and other buildings. It had its own post office, a two-room school with two teachers, a church, baseball team, community center, and a doctor. The islanders supported themselves mainly by dredging for oysters, fishing for shad and crabbing. Their fleet of workboats included 41 skipjacks, 10 schooners and 36 bugeyes, some of which were built on the island.

In 1914 the wind and tide began to seriously erode the west side of the island, where most of the houses were located. This forced the inhabitants to move to the mainland. Many disassembled their houses and other structures and took them to the mainland, predominantly Crisfield. Attempts to protect the island by building stone walls were unsuccessful. The last family left the island in 1918 when a tropical storm damaged the island's church. A few of the former residents continued living on the island during the fishing season until 1922 when the church was moved to Fairmount, Maryland.

Stephen White, a minister, cared for the island for many years and formed The Holland Island Preservation Foundation. In June 2010, White sold the island to the Concorde Foundation. In October 2010, the last remaining house on Holland Island, built in 1888, collapsed.

=== Lighthouse ===
The Holland Island Bar Light, a lighthouse originally built to the south of Holland Island in 1889, was dismantled and replaced with an automated light in 1960.

== Geology and ecology ==
The land of the island has been submerged as a result of erosion exacerbated by climate-change related sea level rise and associated with the sinking of the land's surface associated with isostatic subsidence. This process has caused a major loss of land on the island. Like other Chesapeake Bay islands, Holland Island is primarily made up of clay and silt. The western ridge of the island is very exposed to waves in the bay, making it prone to erosion as well. The island's size was reduced by half over the course of nine decades, from approximately 160 acres (65 ha; 0.25 mi^{2}; 0.65 km^{2}) in 1915 to 80 acres (32 ha; 0.13 mi^{2}; 0.32 km^{2}) in 2005.

The evolution of the shoreline of Holland Island (1985-2023)

Most of the remaining land on the island is now marsh. Many birds, including terns, herons, songbirds, and pelicans, used to be found on the island. A survey in 1995 counted 609 nesting pairs in a heron rookery on the island. Hurricane Isabel, a tropical storm by the time it reached Maryland in September 2003, destroyed 60 percent of the trees that previously served the rookery.

== See also ==
- Smith Island, Maryland
- Smith Island (Virginia)
