= National Register of Historic Places listings in Mathews County, Virginia =

Location of Mathews County in Virginia

This is a list of the National Register of Historic Places listings in Mathews County, Virginia.

This is intended to be a complete list of the properties and districts on the National Register of Historic Places in Mathews County, Virginia, United States. The locations of National Register properties and districts for which the latitude and longitude coordinates are included below, may be seen in an online map.

There are 16 properties and districts listed on the National Register in the county.

This National Park Service list is complete through NPS recent listings posted March 6, 2026.

== Current listings ==
	Name on the Register	Image	Date listed	Location	City or town	Description
1	Billups House	Billups House	March 26, 1980 (#80004199)	East of Moon; 37°26′31″N 76°17′11″W	Moon	
2	Fort Cricket Hill	Fort Cricket Hill	June 15, 1970 (#70000811)	East of the Gwynn's Island bridge 37°29′15″N 76°18′22″W	Hudgins	Revolutionary War fortifications
3	Gwynn's Island Historic District		May 6, 2024 (#100010202)	Generally including Route 223 (Cricket Hill Rd.), Route 633 (Old Ferry Road, N. Bay Haven Road). Route 740 (Hill Plantation Road); 37°30′20″N 76°17′32″W	Gwynn	
4	Hesse	Hesse	February 12, 1974 (#74002137)	East of Cobbs Creek off Proctor Ln. 37°30′49″N 76°21′37″W	Blakes	
5	The Lane Hotel	The Lane Hotel	March 1, 2011 (#11000065)	68 Church St. 37°26′03″N 76°19′19″W	Mathews	
6	Mathews County Courthouse Square	Mathews County Courthouse Square	August 18, 1977 (#77001491)	Church St. 37°26′00″N 76°19′20″W	Mathews	
7	Mathews Downtown Historic District	Mathews Downtown Historic District	September 18, 2017 (#100001642)	Mathews County Courthouse Square and vicinity 37°26′01″N 76°19′16″W	Mathews	
8	Methodist Tabernacle	Methodist Tabernacle	May 21, 1975 (#75002024)	Southeast of Mathews on Tabernacle Rd. at its junction with Salem Church Rd. 37°25′19″N 76°17′47″W	Mathews	
9	New Point Comfort Lighthouse	New Point Comfort Lighthouse	March 1, 1973 (#73002037)	Junction of Chesapeake Bay and Mobjack Bay; 37°18′04″N 76°16′40″W	New Point	
10	Old Thomas James Store	Old Thomas James Store	March 28, 2008 (#08000244)	Main and Maple Sts. 37°26′01″N 76°19′14″W	Mathews Court House	
11	Poplar Grove Mill and House	Poplar Grove Mill and House	November 12, 1969 (#69000259)	Southwest of the junction of State Route 14 and Poplar Grove Ln. 37°23′54″N 76°20′07″W	Williams	
12	Riverlawn	Riverlawn	August 22, 2012 (#12000543)	134 Williamsdale Lane; 37°24′36″N 76°20′30″W	Mathews	
13	Sibley's and James Store Historic District	Sibley's and James Store Historic District	March 24, 2010 (#10000093)	239 Main St. (Main and Maple Sts.); 37°26′01″N 76°19′15″W	Mathews	
14	Springdale	Springdale	May 23, 2013 (#13000339)	1108 State Route 14; 37°25′20″N 76°19′41″W	Mathews	
15	B. Williams & Co. Store	B. Williams & Co. Store	June 3, 2009 (#09000394)	1030 Williams Wharf Rd. 37°24′15″N 76°20′43″W	Mathews	
16	Wolf Trap Light Station	Wolf Trap Light Station	December 2, 2002 (#02001434)	Southeast of New Point Comfort; 37°13′49″N 76°11′24″W	Poquoson East	

== Former listings ==
	Name on the Register	Image	Date listed	Date removed	Location	City or town	Description
1	Donk's Theatre	Donk's Theatre	January 28, 2011 (#10001185)	February 7, 2017	259 Buckley Hall Rd. 37°28′18″N 76°19′35″W	Hudgins	On January 22, 2016, the roof of Donk's collapsed due to heavy snowfall from a winter storm, as did several of the outside walls. Little survived, and what remained required demolition.

== See also ==
- List of National Historic Landmarks in Virginia
- National Register of Historic Places listings in Virginia
