= Virginia State Route 223 =

State highway in Mathews County, Virginia, US

State Route 223
- Cricket Hill Road

Route information
- Maintained by VDOT
- Length: 2.07 mi (3.33 km)
- Existed: 1933–present

Major junctions
- South end: SR 198 at Hudgins
- North end: SR 633 on Gwynn's Island

Location
- Country: United States
- State: Virginia
- Counties: Mathews

Highway system
- Virginia Routes; Interstate; US; Primary; Secondary; Byways; History; HOT lanes
← SR 222	→ SR 224

State Route 223 (SR 223) is a primary state highway in the U.S. state of Virginia. Known as Cricket Hill Road, the state highway runs 2.07 miles (3.33 km) from SR 198 at Hudgins north to SR 633 on Gwynn's Island, an island at the mouth of the Piankatank River in northeastern Mathews County.

== Route description ==
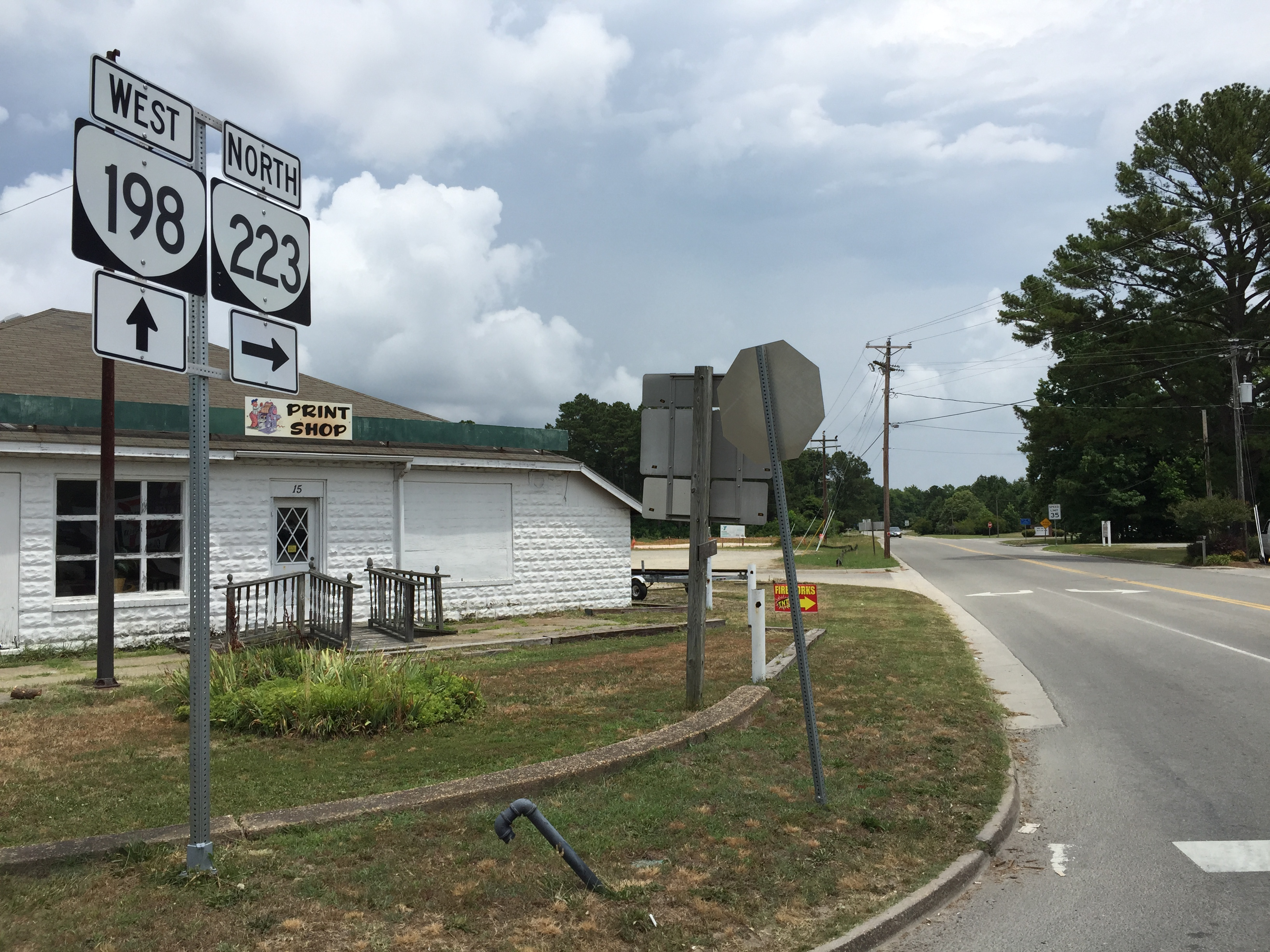
View north along SR 223 at SR 198 in Hudgins

SR 223 begins at an intersection with SR 198 (Buckley Hall Road) at Hudgins. The state highway heads east and curves north through Cricket Hill. North of Cricket Hill, SR 223 crosses Milford Haven, a channel that separates Gwynn's Island from the mainland, and reaches its northern terminus at SR 633 (Old Ferry Road). SR 633 continues northeast through the island's settlements of Grimstead and Gwynn.

== Major intersections ==
The entire route is in Mathews County.

Location	mi	km	Destinations	Notes
Hudgins	0.00	0.00	SR 198 (Buckley Hall Road) – Mathews, Cobbs Creek	Southern terminus
Gwynn's Island	2.07	3.33	SR 633 (Old Ferry Road)	Northern terminus
1.000 mi = 1.609 km; 1.000 km = 0.621 mi

< SR 628	District 6 State Routes; 1928–1933	SR 630 >
