= Fort Cricket Hill =

- U.S. National Register of Historic Places
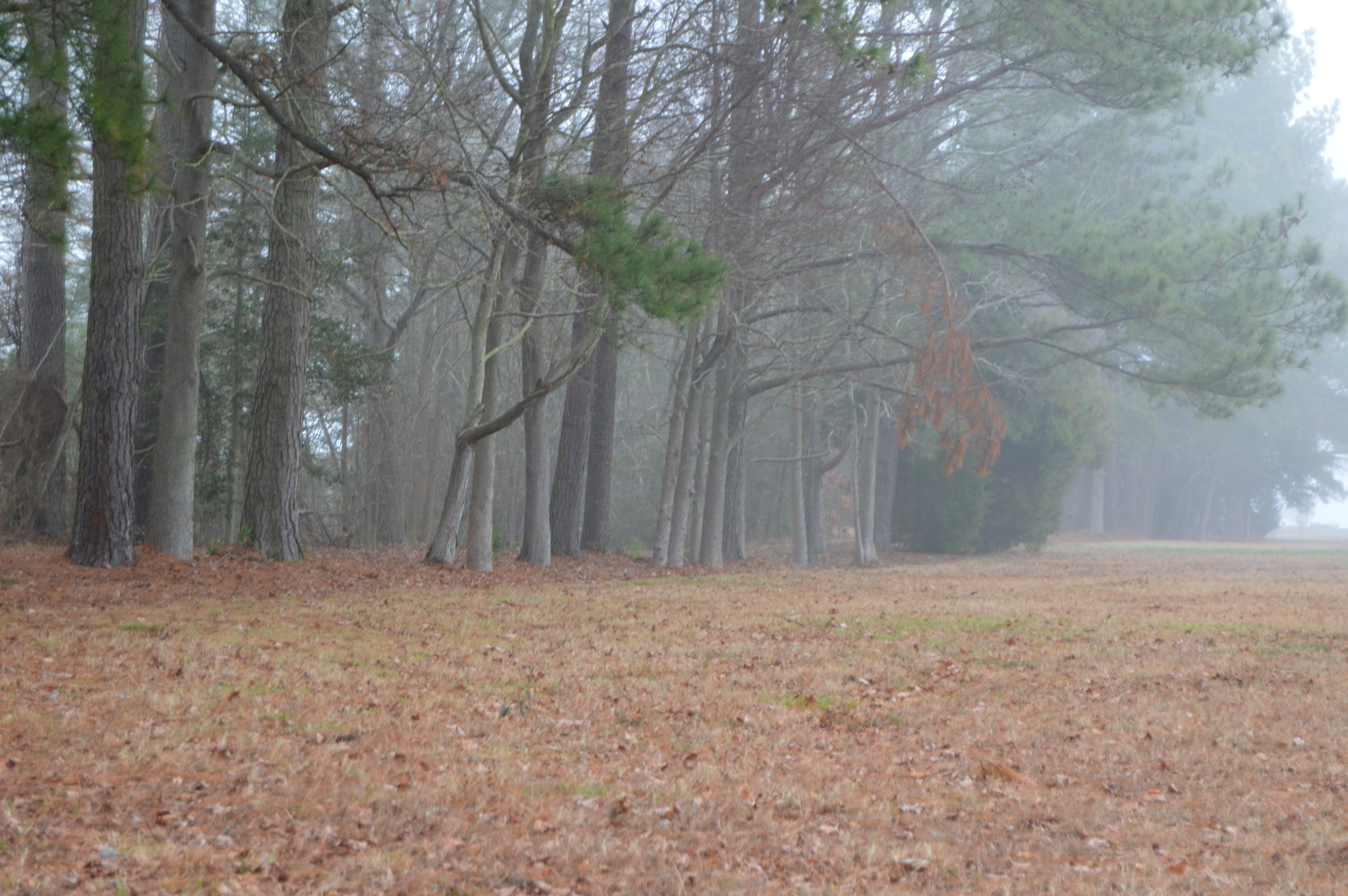
- Overview of the fort site

- Location within Virginia Location within the United States
- Nearest city: Hudgins, Virginia
- Coordinates: 37°29′15″N 76°18′22″W
- Area: 18 acres (7.3 ha)
- Built: 1776
- NRHP reference No.: 70000811
- Added to NRHP: June 15, 1970

Fort Cricket Hill is an historic American Revolutionary War site in Mathews County, Virginia. The site is located near the Gwynn's Island bridge, which carries Cricket Hill Road (Virginia Route 223) to the island from the mainland near the village of Cricket Hill. From fortifications on this site (now marked by a plaque and observation deck), rebel Patriot forces fired on British forces controlled by the royal governor, Lord Dunmore, that had occupied Gwynn's Island.

The site was listed on the National Register of Historic Places in 1970.

== See also ==
- National Register of Historic Places listings in Mathews County, Virginia
