= Hallieford, Virginia =

Unincorporated community in Virginia, United States

- Unincorporated community
- Location within Virginia Location within the United States
- Coordinates: 37°29′37″N 76°20′25″W
- Country: United States
- State: Virginia
- County: Mathews
- Elevation: 13 ft (4.0 m)
- Time zone: UTC-5 (Eastern (EST))
  - Summer (DST): UTC-4 (EDT)
- ZIP code: 23068
- Area code: 804
- GNIS feature ID: 1477387

Hallieford is an unincorporated community in Mathews County, Virginia, United States. Hallieford is 4 miles (6.4 km) north-northwest of Mathews and has a post office with ZIP code 23068.
