= B. Williams & Co. Store =

Historic commercial building in Virginia, United States

- U.S. National Register of Historic Places
- Virginia Landmarks Register
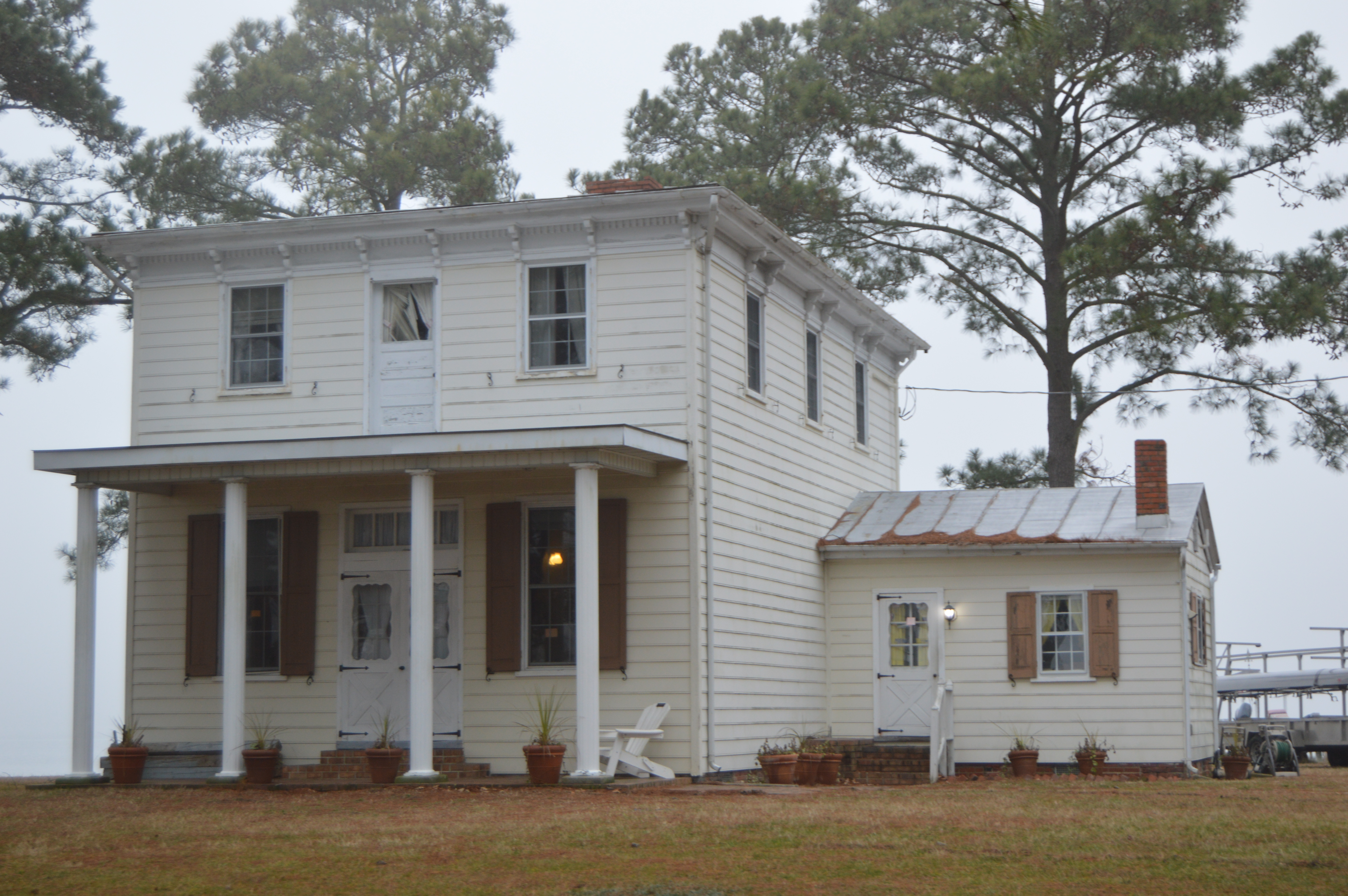
- Front and eastern side

- Location within Virginia Location within the United States
- Location: 1030 Williams Wharf Rd., near Mathews, Virginia
- Coordinates: 37°24′15″N 76°20′43″W
- Area: 1 acre (0.40 ha)
- Built: 1869-1870
- Built by: Williams, Josiah
- Architectural style: Classical Greek Revival
- NRHP reference No.: 09000394
- VLR No.: 057-0035

Significant dates
- Added to NRHP: June 3, 2009
- Designated VLR: March 19, 2009

B. Williams & Co. Store is a historic country store located near Mathews, Mathews County, Virginia. It was built in 1869–1870, and is a two-story frame mercantile building. The building features Classical Greek Revival elements including an original cornice with dentilled molding and curved brackets. The store functioned as a post office, commercial and residential building from its completion until the end of steamboat traffic in Mobjack Bay in 1935.

It was listed on the National Register of Historic Places in 2009.
