= USS Congress (ID-3698) =

Patrol vessel of the United States Navy

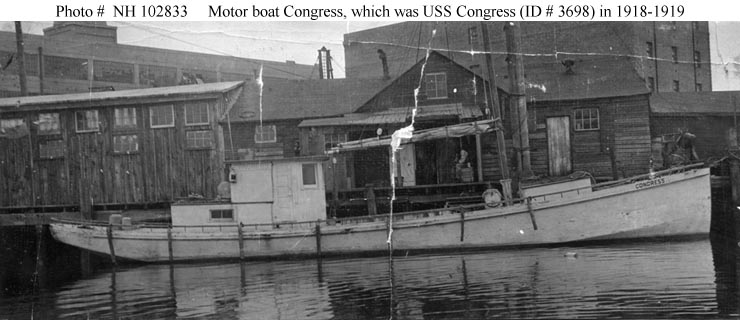
- The fishing vessel Congress prior to her 1918–1919 service as the U.S. Navy patrol vessel USS Congress (ID-3698), perhaps at the time of her inspection for possible naval service by the 5th Naval District on 17 May 1918

History

United States
- Name: USS Congress
- Namesake: The United States Congress (previous name retained)
- Completed: 1914
- Acquired: October 1918
- Commissioned: 25 September 1918 (in advance of official acquisition)
- Stricken: 23 September 1919
- Fate: Sold 23 September 1919; Possibly resold 8 December 1919; Delivered to purchaser 24 December 1919
- Notes: Operated as private fishing vessel Congress 1914–1918

General characteristics
- Type: Motor launch, used as patrol vessel
- Length: 50 ft 8 in (15.44 m)

The sixth USS Congress (ID-3698) was a motor launch in commission in the United States Navy as a patrol vessel from 1918 to 1919.

Congress was built as the private fishing vessel Congress in 1914 at Gwynn, Virginia. The U.S. Navy's 5th Naval District inspected her on 17 May 1918 for possible World War I service. The Navy purchased her from A. Foster of Grimstead, Virginia, in October 1918, having already commissioned her as USS Congress on 25 September 1918. The Navy assigned her Identification Number (Id. No.) 3698 and placed her in service on 18 October 1918.

Congress carried out miscellaneous patrol duties in the 5th Naval District until 23 September 1919, when she was stricken from the Navy Directory. She was sold on 23 September 1919, then possibly resold on 8 December 1919, ultimately being delivered to Sallie S. Thorns of West Norfolk, Virginia, on 24 December 1919.
