= New Point Comfort =

Peninsula in Virginia, US

Coordinates: 37°18′07″N 76°16′39″W

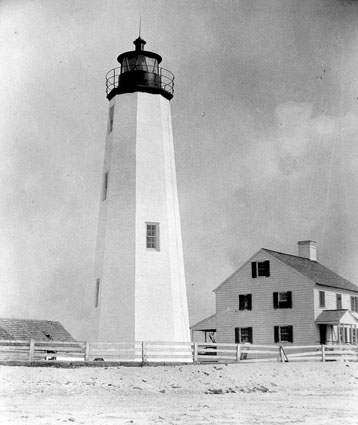
New Point Comfort with lighthouse

New Point Comfort is a point of land located in Mathews County at the tip of Virginia's Middle Peninsula in the lower Chesapeake Bay in the United States. It is the site of the New Point Comfort Natural Area Preserve and the New Point Comfort Light.

== Geography ==
The tip New Point Comfort is now on an island separated from the mainland of Mathews County south of the unincorporated town of Bavon at the mouth of Mobjack Bay. It is 21 miles (34 km) north of Old Point Comfort in Phoebus, Hampton. The peninsula to the north of the point, from Peppers Creek and Horn Harbor southward, is also called New Point Comfort.

== History ==
English explorer John Smith passed by New Point Comfort in 1608 when returning to Jamestown from the northern Chesapeake Bay. The New Point Comfort Light was built from 1802–1805 and by 1852, it was partially cut off by the sea and formed a new island. In 1904, the New Point Comfort Development Company was formed to build a resort on the peninsula by reclaiming the marsh that separated the lighthouse from the mainland and building beaches. However, the prohibitive cost doomed the project and the business went bankrupt. In 1933, the Chesapeake Potomac Hurricane and the Outer Banks Hurricane definitively severed the lighthouse from the mainland and it now is about one and a half miles (2.4 km) from shore on a small riprap island.
