= Mathews Downtown Historic District =

Historic district in Virginia, United States

- Mathews County Courthouse Square
- U.S. National Register of Historic Places
- U.S. Historic district
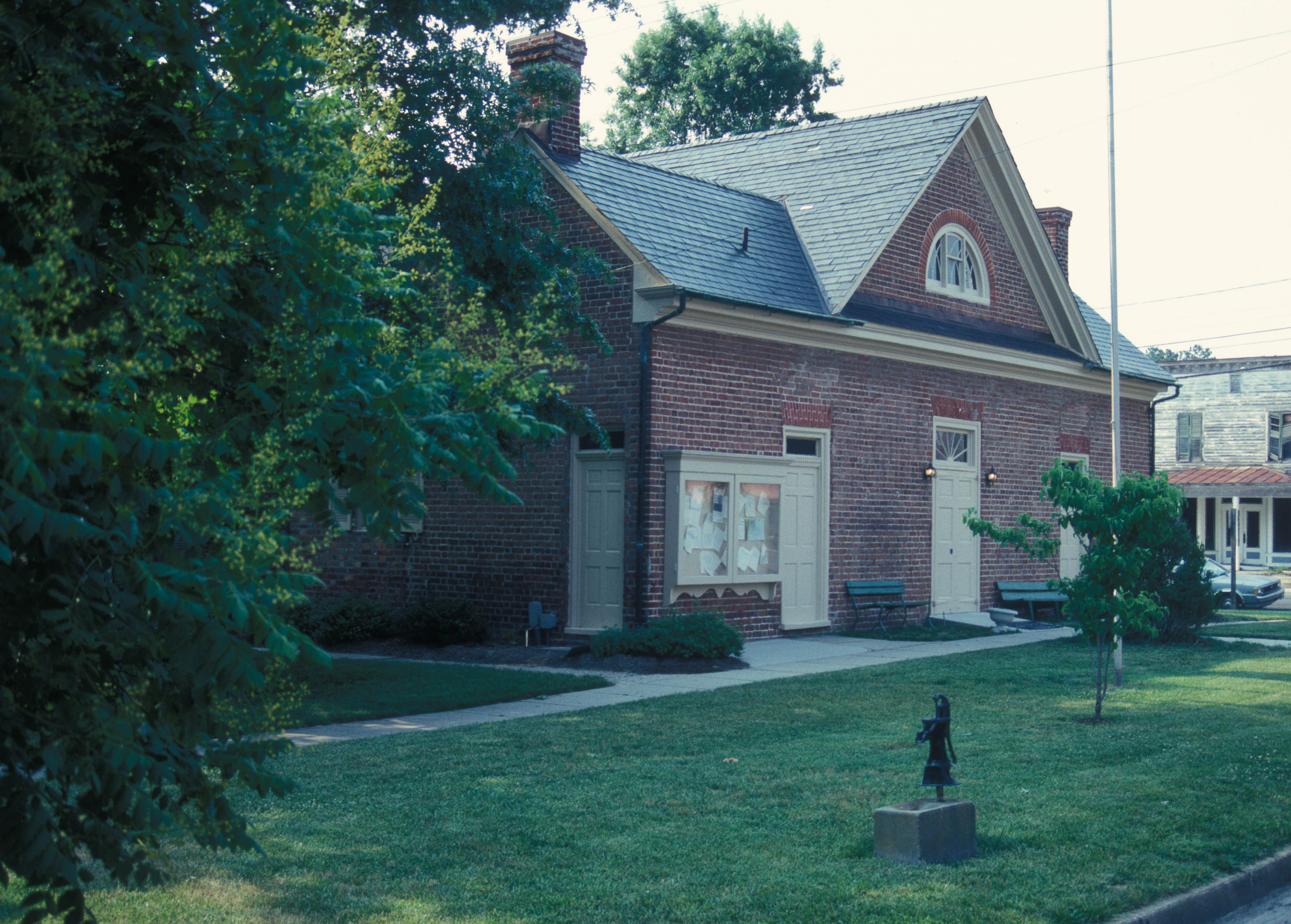
- Mathews County Courthouse, April 1971

- Location within Virginia Location within the United States
- Location: Mathews Courthouse Square and vicinity, Mathews, Virginia
- Coordinates: 37°26′00″N 76°19′21″W
- Area: 177 acres (72 ha)
- Built: 1792-1795
- NRHP reference No.: 100001642
- Added to NRHP: September 18, 2017

Mathews County Courthouse Square is a national historic district located at Mathews, Mathews County, Virginia. It encompasses most of the town center of Mathews, which was originally named Westview before the county was created in 1791. Located centrally in the county, the crossroads community developed as a service center for the surrounding area. It is also archaeologically sensitive, as the area was a Native American settlement from the Early Woodland phase before it became a colonial settlement.

The district was listed on the National Register of Historic Places in 2017.

== See also ==
- National Register of Historic Places listings in Mathews County, Virginia
