= North, Virginia =

Unincorporated community in Virginia, United States

- Unincorporated community
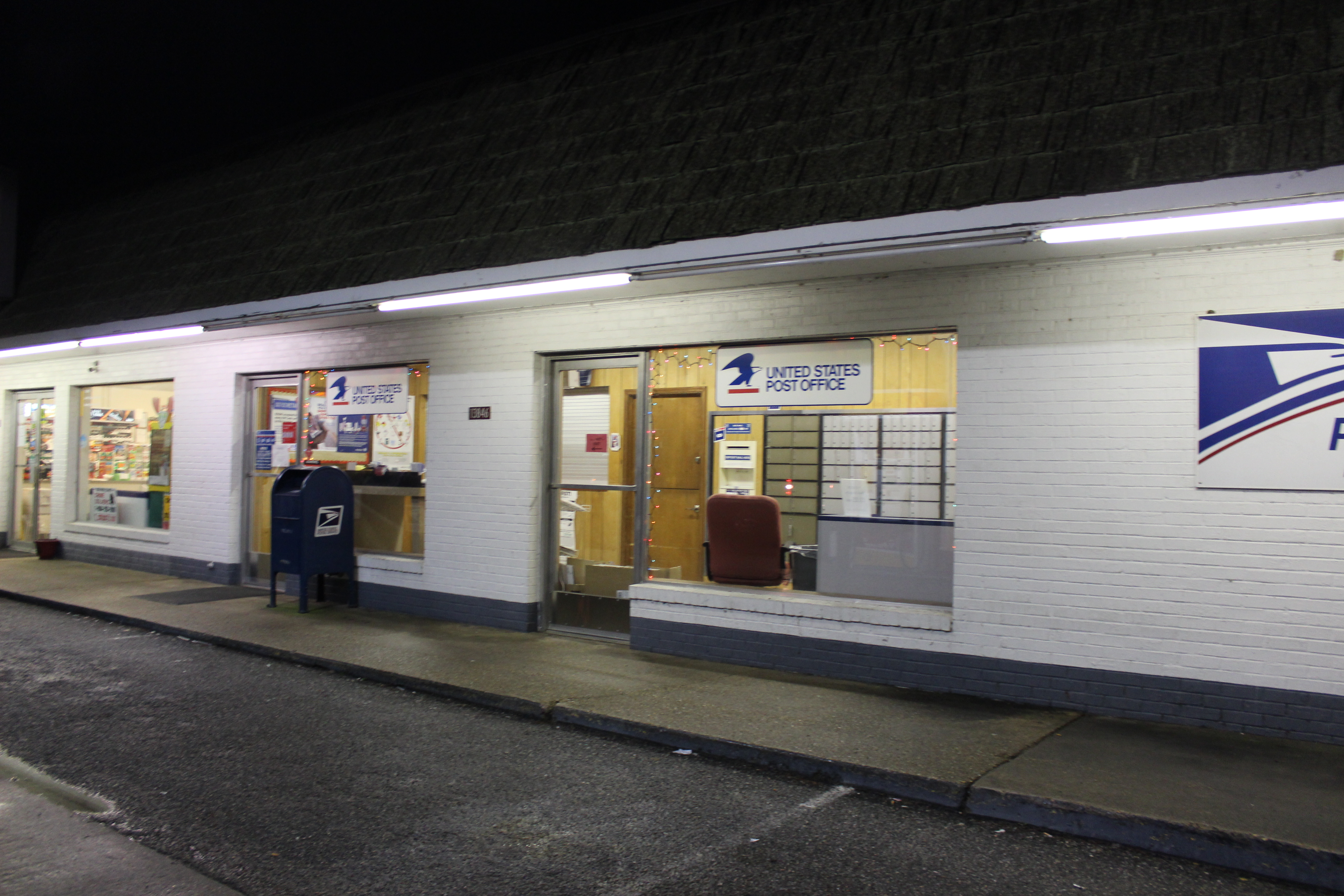
- Post office in North

- Location within Virginia Location within the United States
- Coordinates: 37°26′39″N 76°24′23″W
- Country: United States
- State: Virginia
- County: Mathews
- Elevation: 7 ft (2.1 m)
- Time zone: UTC-5 (Eastern (EST))
  - Summer (DST): UTC-4 (EDT)
- ZIP code: 23128
- Area code: 804
- GNIS feature ID: 1471572

North is an unincorporated community in Mathews County, Virginia, United States. North is located on Virginia State Route 14, 4.75 miles (7.64 km) west of Mathews. North has a post office with ZIP code 23128.

== Folklore ==
North gave rise to the legend of the “Hoochler,” a human-like creature said to inhabit the surrounding woods. Described as a broad figure with a hooked hand, the Hoochler is the subject of longstanding warnings advising residents to remain vigilant over their hooch. In March 2026, the legend resurfaced following multiple supposed sightings, drawing unsuspected tourism to North.
