= Sarah, Virginia =

Unincorporated community in Virginia, US

Coordinates: 37°23′19″N 76°16′55″W

Sarah is an unincorporated community in Mathews County, Virginia, United States.
