= Motorun, Virginia =

Unincorporated community in the U.S. state of Virginia

Coordinates: 37°20′14″N 76°18′02″W

Motorun is an unincorporated community in Mathews County, in the U. S. state of Virginia.
