= Elzy Burroughs =

Elzy Burroughs (1771/77–1825) was an American stonemason, engineer, lighthouse builder and keeper.

Elzy Burroughs was born and raised in Stafford County, Virginia. Elzy Burroughs' family leased and operated a sandstone quarry in the Aquia Creek area of Stafford County. Known as Aquia sandstone, material from quarries in this area was utilized in the construction of Mount Vernon, the United States Capitol building, the White House, and the first lighthouse constructed at Cape Henry in Princess Anne County, Virginia, at the mouth of the Chesapeake Bay.

As a child, Elzy would have grown up playing near sandstone quarries. He would have been surrounded by expert stonemasons and by all of the tools, equipment and skills that are necessary to that profession. So it was no surprise when he, too, grew up to join in the mason's craft.

As a young man, Burroughs worked as a mason and builder across the Tidewater Virginia region. He had a young wife, the former Miss Lightburn, also of Stafford County, and a growing family. During his travels he built stone and brick structures, including the county clerks' offices in York and Middlesex Counties. His oldest son, John Jay Burroughs (who later served as Clerk of Court of Princess Anne County), was born during this period in 1798 in Middlesex County, Virginia.

Under contract with the young United States Government under President Thomas Jefferson, Elzy Burroughs built three lighthouses along the Virginia coast, at Old Point Comfort at Fort Monroe in 1802, at Smith Point in Northumberland County around 1803 (moved further inland and rebuilt by Burroughs in 1807), and at New Point Comfort, in Mathews County in 1804. Only the towers at Old Point and New Point have survived until the present, and both of these are known to be constructed from Aquia sandstone, likely from the Burroughs family quarry.

Soon after the construction of the New Point Comfort Light, Burroughs settled in Mathews County with his wife and son John, building a private house for his family on New Point Comfort Island (which he owned). Elzy was also appointed keeper of that lighthouse, where he served officially until 1814. In fact, the subcontractor Elzy had hired to build the new official keeper's house there had failed to properly supervise the firing of bricks for the house, and they were ruined. Since Elzy had paid the subcontractor in advance, he was financially ruined as well. So Elzy agreed to serve as keeper until he could find a way to finish the keeper's house.

In the first decade of the nineteenth century Elzy's family members served as keepers of every Virginia lighthouse but one. Elzy's younger brother William K. Burroughs was appointed the second keeper of the Smith Point Light in 1806, another brother, Travey Burroughs, was appointed keeper at Cape Henry Light, and a few years later Elzy was succeeded as keeper at New Point Comfort Light by his brother-in-law, Robert Lightburn.

Elzy Burroughs is known to have moved to the Norfolk, Virginia area in 1810, before the end of his keeping service, and sold New Point Comfort Island. By this time he is recorded to have been a widower with a large family. His wife apparently died sometime in late 1810 of unknown causes.

During the War of 1812 Elzy was a Captain in command of the 20th Regiment Local Militia in Princess Anne County, and may have served on the staff of Brigadier General Robert Barraud Taylor, who was in charge of military operations in the Hampton Roads area. In connection with his service, family sources have called Burroughs a "hero of the Battle of Craney Island".

Following the War of 1812, Elzy was again contracted by the Federal Government, this time to repair significant damage to all four Virginia lighthouses caused by British troops in the War.

In 1818 Elzy Burroughs constructed a home and farm for his family, which he named "Cedar Grove", on several hundred acres fronting what was then Holland Swamp Road (now Holland Road), near the new Princess Anne Courthouse that had just recently been moved from the Kempsville area. The house still stands today, was renamed "Buyrningwood Farm" after being sold to the Buyrn family in the early 1930s, and is located near the modern Floyd E. Kellam High School.

Later, Elzy's son, John Jay Burroughs, took residence at Cedar Grove and Elzy moved to and lived the rest of his life in a home on Boush Street in downtown Norfolk, running a successful road construction business.

Elzy married his second wife, Ms. Ann Murphy, on December 12, 1820, in Norfolk, but she died less than two years later. Not long after this, on November 8, 1825, Elzy Burroughs himself died at Cedar Grove after a short illness. Elzy's place of burial at Cedar Grove became the Burroughs Family Cemetery, which is now within sight of the modern Virginia Beach Municipal Center.
