= Pribble, Virginia =

Unincorporated community in Virginia, US

Coordinates: 37°23′46″N 76°22′32″W

Pribble is an unincorporated community in Mathews County, in the U. S. state of Virginia.
