= Springdale (Mathews, Virginia) =

Historic house in Virginia, United States

- U.S. National Register of Historic Places
- Virginia Landmarks Register
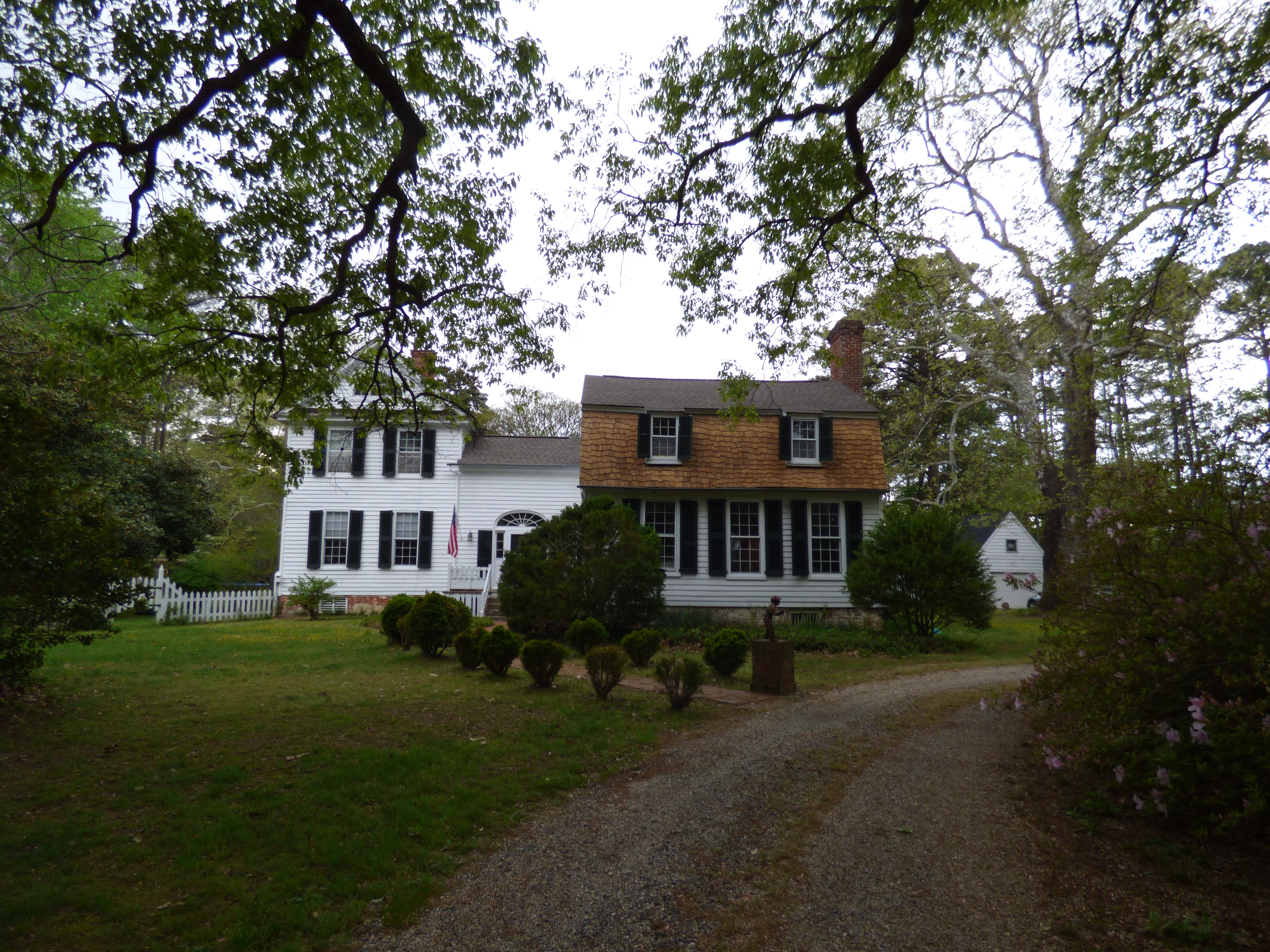

- Location within Virginia Location within the United States
- Location: 1108 New Point Comfort Hwy., near Mathews, Virginia
- Coordinates: 37°25′20″N 76°19′41″W
- Area: 6.4 acres (2.6 ha)
- Built: c. 1750, 1774-1824, c. 1840
- Built by: Respess, William, Shultice, Dr. William
- Architectural style: Georgian, Federal
- NRHP reference No.: 13000339
- VLR No.: 057-0018

Significant dates
- Added to NRHP: May 23, 2013
- Designated VLR: March 21, 2013

Springdale is a historic plantation house located near Mathews, Mathews County, Virginia. The original section of the house may date to about 1750. Originally the house was a frame Georgian style two-story, side-passage gambrel roof dwelling with a brick cellar. A one-story shed addition was added in the late-18th or early-19th century. This section of the house was renovated between about 1774 and 1824. The house was expanded by 1840, with a 2 1/2-story, Federal style south wing and 1 1/2-story hyphen connecting the two wings. Also on the property is a contributing smokehouse (c. 1774–1825) and archaeological site.

It was listed on the National Register of Historic Places in 2013.
