= Battle of Gwynn's Island =

Battle of the American Revolutionary War

- Part of the American Revolutionary War
Date	July 8–10, 1776
Location	Gwynn, Virginia 37°30′15″N 76°17′19″W
Result	American victory

Belligerents
United States	Great Britain; Loyalists

Commanders and leaders
(United States) Andrew Lewis	(Kingdom of Great Britain) Lord Dunmore

Strength
Infantry brigade 2 × 18-pound cannons 4 × 9-pound cannons	Naval squadron 500 soldiers

Casualties and losses
1 killed	"Sizable" from combat hundreds died of disease

The Battle of Gwynn's Island (July 8–10, 1776) saw Andrew Lewis lead patriot soldiers from Virginia against John Murray, 4th Earl of Dunmore's small naval squadron and British loyalist troops. In this American Revolutionary War action, accurate cannon fire from the nearby Virginia mainland persuaded Dunmore to abandon his base at Gwynn's Island. While camping on the island, the loyalists suffered heavy mortality from smallpox and an unknown fever, particularly among the escaped slaves that Dunmore recruited to fight against the American rebels. Gwynn's Island is located on the western shore of the Chesapeake Bay in what is now Mathews County but was at that time in Gloucester County.

In late 1775, Dunmore and his loyalist forces were defeated and withdrew aboard their ships off Norfolk. Blocked by American troops from securing food near Norfolk, Dunmore sailed north to base his force at Gwynn's Island for six weeks. The ill-fed loyalists were cooped up aboard Dunmore's ships too long and smallpox broke out. After being driven away from Gwynn's Island, Dunmore's ships lingered in the Chesapeake Bay before his vessels departed for New York and other locations. Dunmore's absence allowed Virginia's troops to join General George Washington's main army.

== Background ==
Even before the news of the Battles of Lexington and Concord reached Virginia, Governor Dunmore clashed with the local patriots in the Gunpowder Incident at Williamsburg on 20–21 April 1775. Already on May 2, Dunmore uttered a threat to free the slaves and burn Williamsburg. Relations between the governor and the colonists continued to deteriorate that summer. On 24–25 October, Dunmore sent ships to destroy Hampton but this effort miscarried. He repeated his threat to free slaves belonging to patriots and began actively recruiting loyalist forces. On December 9, William Woodford's patriot militia defeated Dunmore's forces in the Battle of Great Bridge and occupied Norfolk five days later.

Robert Howe arrived with a North Carolina regiment one day later and assumed command. Dunmore withdrew loyalist forces and refugees aboard his ships in Norfolk harbor. The patriots refused the governor's demands to supply his followers with food. They also prevented the loyalists from foraging ashore and sniped at the ships. On January 1, 1776, Dunmore ordered his warships to bombard Norfolk (population 6,000), wrecking the waterfront district. The patriots countered by burning down homes belonging to loyalists. This led to the Burning of Norfolk when a great fire that lasted two days reduced most of the town to ashes. The patriots razed the remaining buildings after the fire burned itself out. Dunmore landed his followers and built barracks for them, but the patriots stopped them from gathering food.

In late May 1776, Dunmore left Norfolk with his fleet of nearly 100 vessels and sailed 30 miles (48 km) north to Gwynn's Island. Dunmore's loyalists were crowded in unhealthy conditions aboard ships and the governor hoped the 4 square mile island would be a secure place for them to recover. On May 26, Dunmore's fleet anchored in Hills Bay at the mouth of the Piankatank River on the west side of Gwynn's Island. Royal marines from the warships HMS Roebuck (44), HMS Fowey (24), and HMS Otter (14) and Dunmore's forces landed and secured the island. The portion of the island only 200 yards (183 m) from the mainland was fortified and Fort Hamond was built, named after the Roebuck's captain, Andrew Snape Hamond. Dunmore set up his main camp behind the fortifications. His forces included about 100 British regulars of the 14th Foot, the Queen's Own Loyal Virginians, and the Ethiopian Regiment. As Hamond reported at the time, only about 200 soldiers were able-bodied due to the disease raging aboard the ships. One historian estimated that Dunmore's loyalist forces numbered 500 soldiers, white and black.

A military outpost on Burton Point quickly reported the landing and Captain Thomas Posey arrived with his company of the 7th Virginia Regiment. Soon the balance of the 7th Virginia under Colonel William Daingerfield and local militia assembled on the mainland opposite Gwynn's Island. Subjected to harassing cannon fire, many militiamen deserted, but the Continental Army soldiers became accustomed to being under fire. At Williamsburg, General Lewis realized that only artillery could dislodge Dunmore from Gwynn's Island, so he began collecting cannons. While waiting for the artillery, the Virginians defended the shoreline against a possible raid by the loyalists. They noticed the corpses of loyalists floating in the bay, which encouraged them.

Meanwhile, Dunmore discovered that the island's water supply was not adequate for the several hundred people in camp. Hamond noted that Dunmore had inoculated his African-American troops against smallpox and the expedient was successful. However, a second deadly fever was rapidly killing the blacks so that there were only 150 survivors. Hamond reported that the Royal Marines were forced to guard the camp because the British regulars were still weak from sickness and many of the Queen's Own Loyal Virginians were ill with smallpox. In a letter to Lord George Germain, Dunmore admitted that, because of the fever, each of his ships were throwing one to three dead bodies overboard every night. The governor complained that, except for the fever, he might have had 2,000 black recruits, which would have been enough to stamp out the rebellion.

== Battle ==
On July 8, 1776, Lewis arrived in the American patriot camp with a brigade of Virginia troops. A battery of two 18-pounder cannons was established opposite Fort Hamond and within range of Dunmore's flagship, the Dunmore. Several hundred yards south, was a second battery of four 9-pound cannons, tasked with targeting the British loyalist camp and three small vessels guarding Milford Haven on the south side of Gwynn's Island. At 8:00 am on July 9, the 18-pounders opened fire on the Dunmore at a range of 500 yards (457 m). The first shot smashed through the ship's stern and a splinter wounded the governor in the leg. The Dunmore was armed with 6-pound cannons and fired back without hitting anything. Meanwhile, the Dunmore kept getting hit by 18-pound shot. After the boatswain was killed and several men wounded, the demoralized crew flinched from the guns. Since there was no wind to propel the ship, Dunmore ordered the anchor cable cut and had the flagship towed out of range.

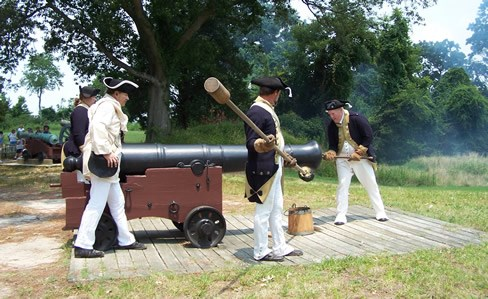
Reenactors dressed in American uniforms load an 18-pounder cannon on a naval carriage.

While the 18-pounders hammered the flagship, the 9-pounders took Fort Hamond and the loyalist camp under accurate fire. At first the fort fired back, but its guns were silenced by the bombardment. Startled by the attack, the loyalist ships within range slipped their anchor cables and had their boats tow them out of range. After about two hours, the commander of the 18-pounders, Captain Dohickey Arundel decided to fire his experimental wooden mortar. The mortar blew up at the first shot, killing Arundel, making him the only patriot casualty of the action. This accident led to a temporary cease fire. By the time firing resumed in the afternoon, there were very few targets. The loyalist ships withdrew out of range farther into the bay, while Fort Hamond and the loyalist camp were abandoned. The patriots claimed that the Dunmore was fatally damaged, but Hamond reported that the ship's injuries were not serious, despite numerous hits. Loyalist losses were said to be "sizable".

Dunmore and Hamond decided that they could no longer stay at Gwynn's Island and ordered the place evacuated that evening. During the night, the loyalists loaded cannons, tents, and other stores aboard their ships. On the morning of July 10, the patriot guns targeted the three vessels guarding Milford Haven. These were seized after their crews abandoned them and the Virginians crossed to the island in canoes. The amphibious attack consisted of 200 men led by Lieutenant Colonel Alexander McClanahan. The remaining loyalists quickly retreated to their ships with few casualties and were gone by 1:00 pm. They left behind many sick and dying African-Americans. There were also many unburied corpses strewn around the island, victims of the fever. Posey estimated that 400–500 blacks and 150 whites succumbed to disease during the six weeks that they were on Gwynn's Island.

== Aftermath ==
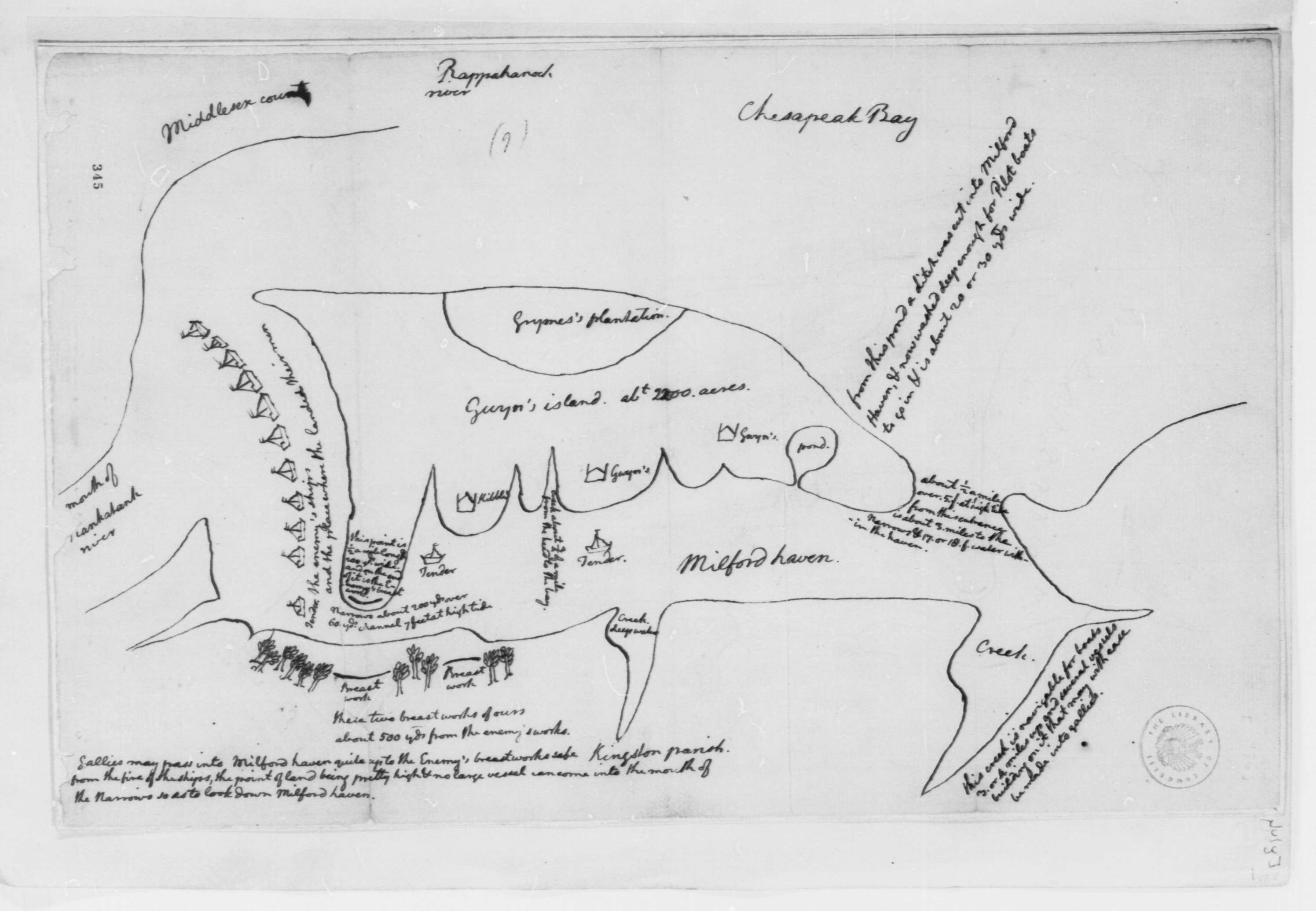
Map of Action at Gwyn's Island, Chesapeake Bay (Thomas Jefferson, June-July 1776)

Dunmore sent several ships to the Potomac River to fill their water casks. While there, they burnt William Brent's plantation in Stafford County, Virginia. The raiding vessels reached as far north as Occoquan Falls before turning back. The patriots feared that the loyalists intended to kidnap Martha Washington at Mount Vernon, but the raiders were turned back by storms and resistance by the local militia. By early August, Dunmore prepared to leave Virginia altogether. His fleet rendezvoused at Lynnhaven Roads and from this place he sent his ships to St. Augustine, Bermuda, and the Caribbean. The ships were loaded with nearly 1,000 slaves captured during the raid. Dunmore sailed to New York, later returning to England and accepting the position of governor of The Bahamas. With Dunmore's fleet no longer a threat to Virginia, the authorities were able to send troops north to join Washington's Continental army in the New York area. The Virginia troops materially helped the American cause in the coming battles.
