= Fitchetts, Virginia =

Unincorporated community in Virginia, US

Coordinates: 37°27′32″N 76°17′24″W

Fitchetts is an unincorporated community in Mathews County, in the U. S. state of Virginia.
