= Emma White =

Emma White may refer to:

- Emma White (cyclist) (born 1997), American racing cyclist
- Emma White (gymnast) (born 1990), British artistic gymnast
- Emma Lee Smith White, member of the Virginia House of Delegates
