= Beaverlett, Virginia =

Unincorporated community in Virginia, US

Coordinates: 37°24′22″N 76°18′32″W

Beaverlett is an unincorporated community in Mathews County, in the U. S. state of Virginia.
