= Winter Harbor Haven, Virginia =

Unincorporated community in Virginia, US

Coordinates: 37°22′33″N 76°15′50″W

Winter Harbor is an unincorporated community in Mathews County, in the U. S. state of Virginia.
