= East River (Virginia) =

River in Virginia, United States

Coordinates: 37°21′56.50″N 76°20′40.80″W

The East River is an 8.8-mile-long (14.2 km), primarily tidal river located in Mathews County in the Middle Peninsula region of Virginia. It flows into Mobjack Bay, which in turn empties into the Chesapeake Bay.

== See also ==
- List of rivers of Virginia
