= Mathews County Courthouse Square =

Historic area in Virginia, US

- U.S. National Register of Historic Places
- U.S. Historic district
- Virginia Landmarks Register
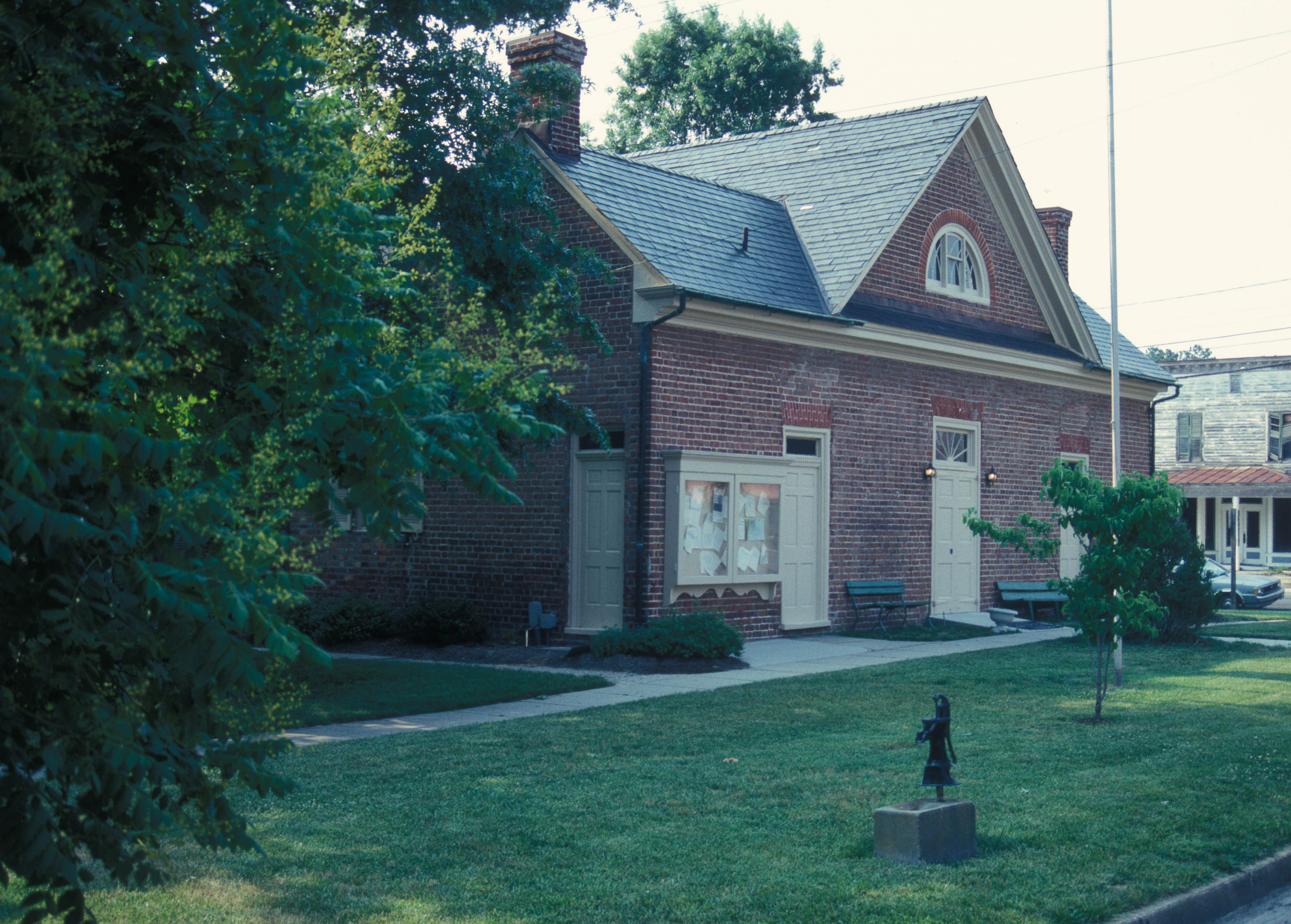
- Mathews County Courthouse, April 1971

- Location within Virginia Location within the United States
- Location: VA 611, Mathews, Virginia
- Coordinates: 37°26′00″N 76°19′21″W
- Area: 1.6 acres (0.65 ha)
- Built: 1792-1795
- Built by: Billups, Richard; Brown, William H.
- Architectural style: Federal, Late 19th And 20th Century Revivals
- NRHP reference No.: 77001491
- VLR No.: 057-0022

Significant dates
- Added to NRHP: August 18, 1977
- Designated VLR: December 21, 1976

Mathews County Courthouse Square is a national historic district located at Mathews, Mathews County, Virginia. It encompasses seven contributing buildings, one contributing site, two contributing structures, and 2 contributing objects on Courthouse Square. The courthouse is a T-shaped, Federal style brick building constructed in 1792–1795. Associated with the courthouse are the clerks office (1859), the former jail and later sheriffs office, "Old Jail," and Mathews County Library (1930). Several monuments occupy the square, notably the Confederate monument, the 1928 Fort Cricket Hill monument, and a World War I cannon.

It was listed on the National Register of Historic Places in 1977.
