= Susan, Virginia =

Unincorporated community in Virginia, US

Coordinates: 37°21′57″N 76°18′49″W

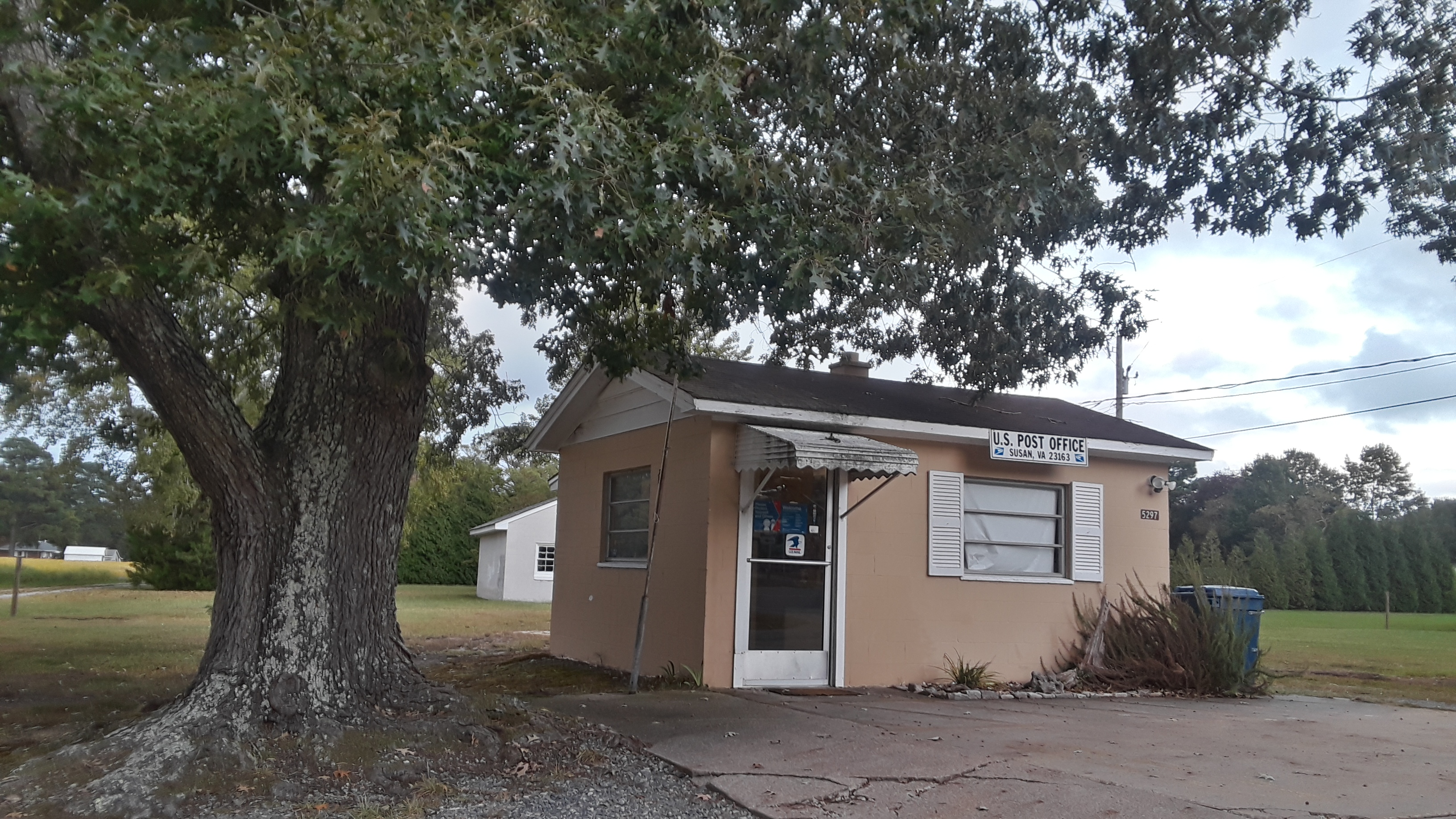
Post office in Susan at dusk

Susan is an unincorporated community in Mathews County, in the U. S. state of Virginia.
