= John J. Burroughs =

American politician

John Jay Burroughs (1798–1872) was an American lawyer and Clerk of the Circuit Court for Princess Anne County, Virginia (now the city of Virginia Beach).

Burroughs was born in either Essex County or Middlesex County, Virginia on October 10, 1798. He was the eldest child of lighthouse builder and keeper Elzy Burroughs.

Burroughs became the longest serving Clerk of the Circuit Court for Princess Anne County, Virginia in its history. During the American Civil War, Burroughs was the only functioning remnant of civil government in the county while it was occupied by Union forces. Burroughs entered his court career at age 17 in 1815 as a writer for the Hustings Court in Norfolk. In 1817 he qualified as Deputy Clerk, and in 1819 qualified as the Deputy Clerk of the Circuit Court of Princess Anne County Virginia. In 1821 he assumed the Clerkship upon the death of the incumbent clerk, remaining in this position until he was removed by the order of Union General Early in May 1869.

Two of Burroughs' sons were John J. ("Jack") Burroughs, Jr. and Judge William Henry Burroughs, both prominent local attorneys and businessmen in Princess Anne County history. Jack Burroughs was educated at the Galt Academy in Norfolk and later at Lynchburg College in Lynchburg Virginia. William H. Burroughs attended The Virginia Military Institute, graduating in 1851 and the Law School of the College of William and Mary in Williamsburg, Virginia, graduating in 1854.

Burroughs' descendants remained prominent in Princess Anne County government and politics until the early 1930s, when a "throw the bums out attitude", rising out of the din of the economic Depression, led to a wholesale change of county leadership. At this same time the old family farm at Cedar Grove on Holland Road in Princess Anne County, Virginia, was sold out of the family.

Burroughs was considered a progressive for his day, and was active in the efforts of the American Colonization Society to assist former slaves from Virginia to voluntarily resettle in the new nation of Liberia, in West Africa. There was little interest from the County's former slaves in this initiative, however.

In recognition of his important role in Princess Anne County history, Mr. Burroughs' portrait hangs on the wall within the modern Virginia Beach Municipal Center.
