= Bavon, Virginia =

Unincorporated community in Virginia, United States

- Unincorporated community
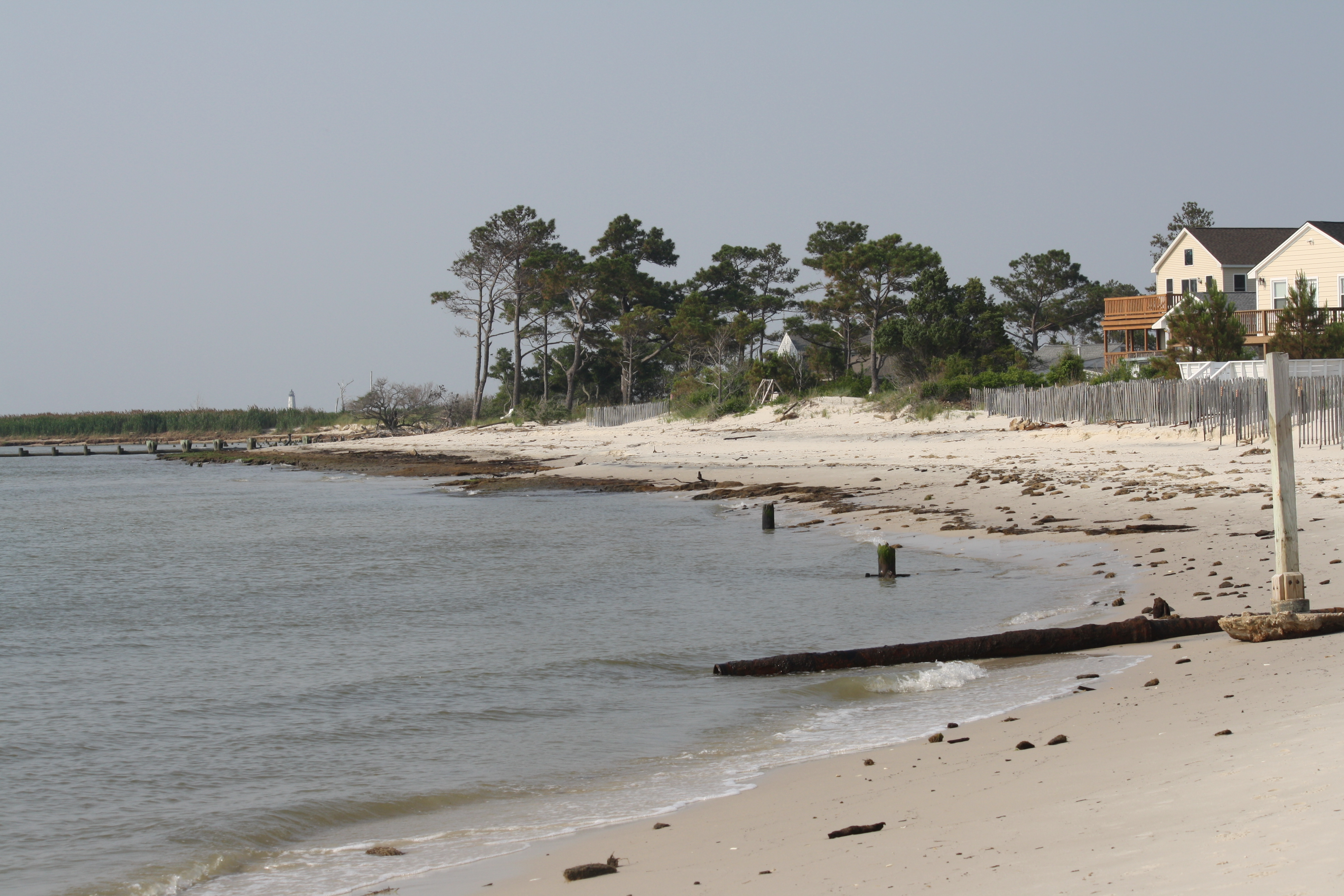
- Bavon beach

- Location within Virginia Location within the United States
- Coordinates: 37°20′00″N 76°17′18″W
- Country: United States
- State: Virginia
- County: Mathews
- Elevation: 3 ft (0.91 m)
- Time zone: UTC-5 (Eastern (EST))
  - Summer (DST): UTC-4 (EDT)
- Area code: 804
- GNIS feature ID: 1462835

Bavon is an unincorporated community in Mathews County, Virginia, United States. Bavon is located on Virginia Route 14, 7.5 miles (12.1 km) south-southeast of Mathews.
