= New Point Comfort Light =

Lighthouse in Virginia, United States

- New Point Comfort Light, Virginia (NPS)
- Location: New Point Comfort at the entrance to MobJack Bay in the Chesapeake Bay
- Coordinates: 37.3006°N 76.2775°W

Tower
- Constructed: 1805
- Construction: sandstone masonry
- Automated: 1930
- Height: 58 feet (18 m)
- Shape: Octagonal tower
- Heritage: National Register of Historic Places listed place, Virginia Historic Landmark

Light
- First lit: 1806
- Deactivated: 1963-1999
- Focal height: 17.5 m (57 ft)
- Lens: fourth-order Fresnel lens (original), 9.8 inches (250 mm) API (current)
- Range: 13 miles (21 km)
- Characteristic: Fixed white
- New Point Comfort Lighthouse
- U.S. National Register of Historic Places
- Virginia Landmarks Register
- Nearest city: New Point, Virginia
- Area: 9 acres (3.6 ha)
- Built by: Elzy Burroughs
- NRHP reference No.: 73002037
- VLR No.: 057-0064

Significant dates
- Added to NRHP: March 1, 1973
- Designated VLR: June 20, 1972

New Point Comfort Light is a lighthouse in the Virginia portion of the Chesapeake Bay, United States, off the tip of the Middle Peninsula. Finished in 1804, it is the third-oldest surviving light in the bay, and the tenth-oldest in the United States.

== History ==
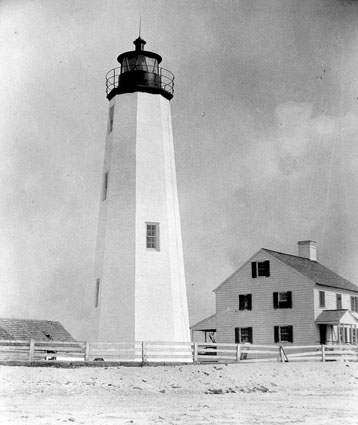
Undated USCG photograph showing keeper's house

New Point Comfort was one of four locations in the Chesapeake Bay designated for a lighthouse by the newly formed federal government, and in 1801 funds were appropriated for its construction along with a light at Smith Point. Both were constructed by Elzy Burroughs, who also constructed the light at Old Point Comfort which is nearly the twin of this light. (Note that Old Point Comfort and New Point Comfort are two different locations, not two different lights on the same spot.) Burroughs's involvement with New Point Comfort, however, extended beyond construction. New Point Comfort at the time was a small island separated from the mainline by a narrow passage named Deep Creek. A dispute with the owner of the island over the portion needed for the light led first to an additional appropriation; but then Burroughs bought the entire island and sold the government the few acres needed for the light. His decision to subcontract out the construction of the keeper's house proved unwise, and the subcontractor took sick and was unable to supervise the firing of the bricks for the house, which were thus ruined. In the end, Burroughs was appointed keeper himself, a position he held for ten years.

In the War of 1812 British forces destroyed the lantern of the light and the keeper's house. Burroughs he was called upon to rebuild the house. It was he who also took the first steps against the erosion which already threatened the light, by putting a pile- and debris-lined ditch around the tower. The light was extinguished again in the Civil War, but the damage at that time was relatively light. By this time a fourth-order Fresnel lens had been installed. The light was upgraded to acetylene in 1919 and was fully automated in 1930; in the intervening years the keeper's house was demolished and the light maintained with occasional visits only.

Erosion was a constant problem. In 1839 it was already necessary to use a boat to reach the light. The Chesapeake-Potomac Hurricane of 1933 finally cut through the island and left the tower standing on a tiny parcel isolated from the rest of the island. At the same time shoaling to the south of the light rendered it useless as a marker, and it was replaced by an offshore beacon in 1963 and deactivated.

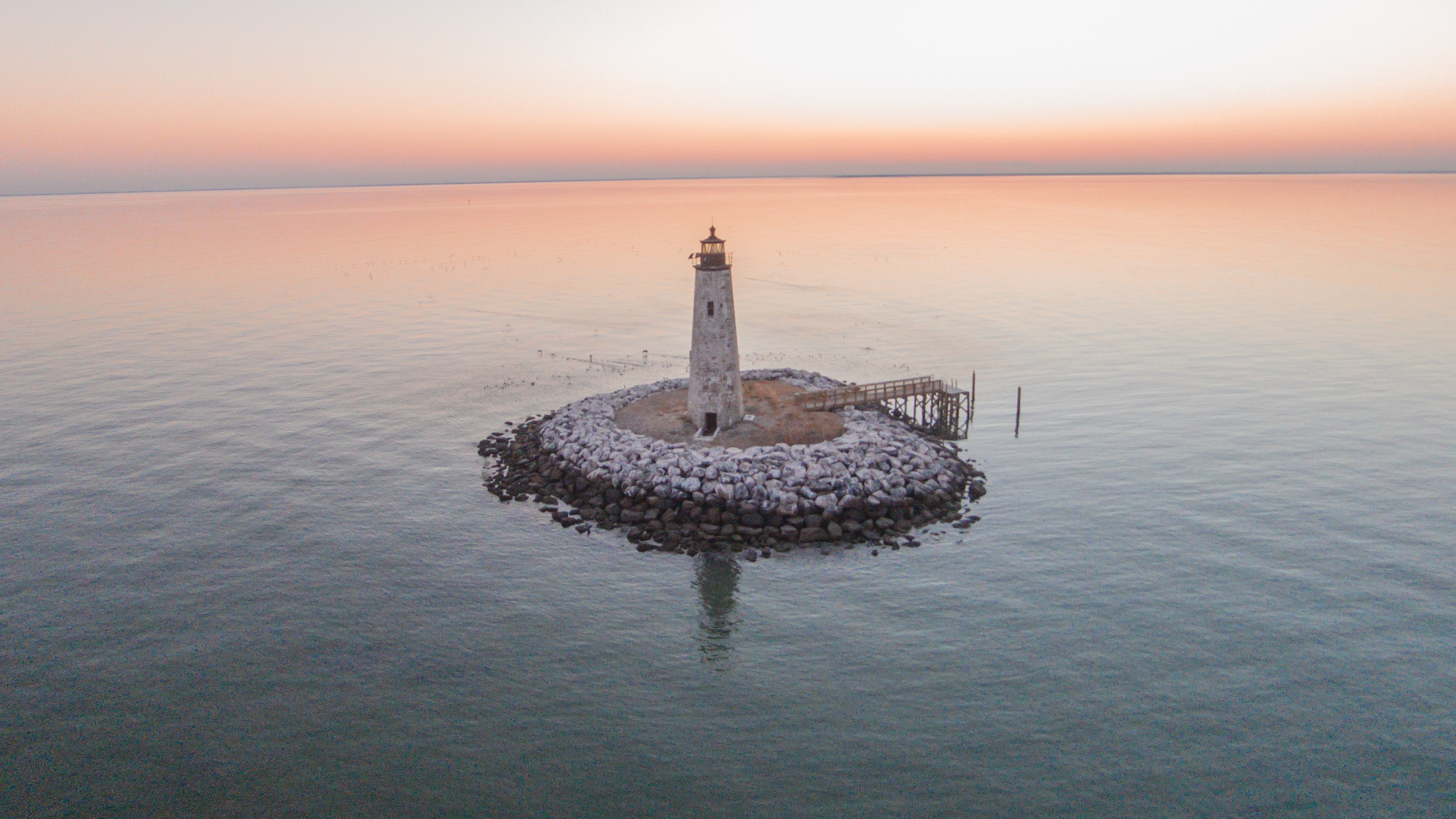
Aerial View of New Point Comfort Lighthouse, October 2016

New Point Comfort Light was an early beneficiary of conservation efforts, being transferred to Mathews County in 1975, three years after being listed in the National Register of Historic Places. The lighthouse was renovated in 1989 and reactivated in 1999. In 2001 a task force was formed by the county to oversee the preservation of the lighthouse. In 2012, a grant funded the construction of an enlarged rock barrier to protect the structure, and in 2016, another grant was used to replace the storm-damaged access pier. The tower still stands, surrounded by water, visible from a walkway constructed at the southern tip of the county. Following a lengthy restoration, the lighthouse was relit in October 2021.
