= Grimstead, Virginia =

Unincorporated community in Virginia, United States

- Unincorporated community
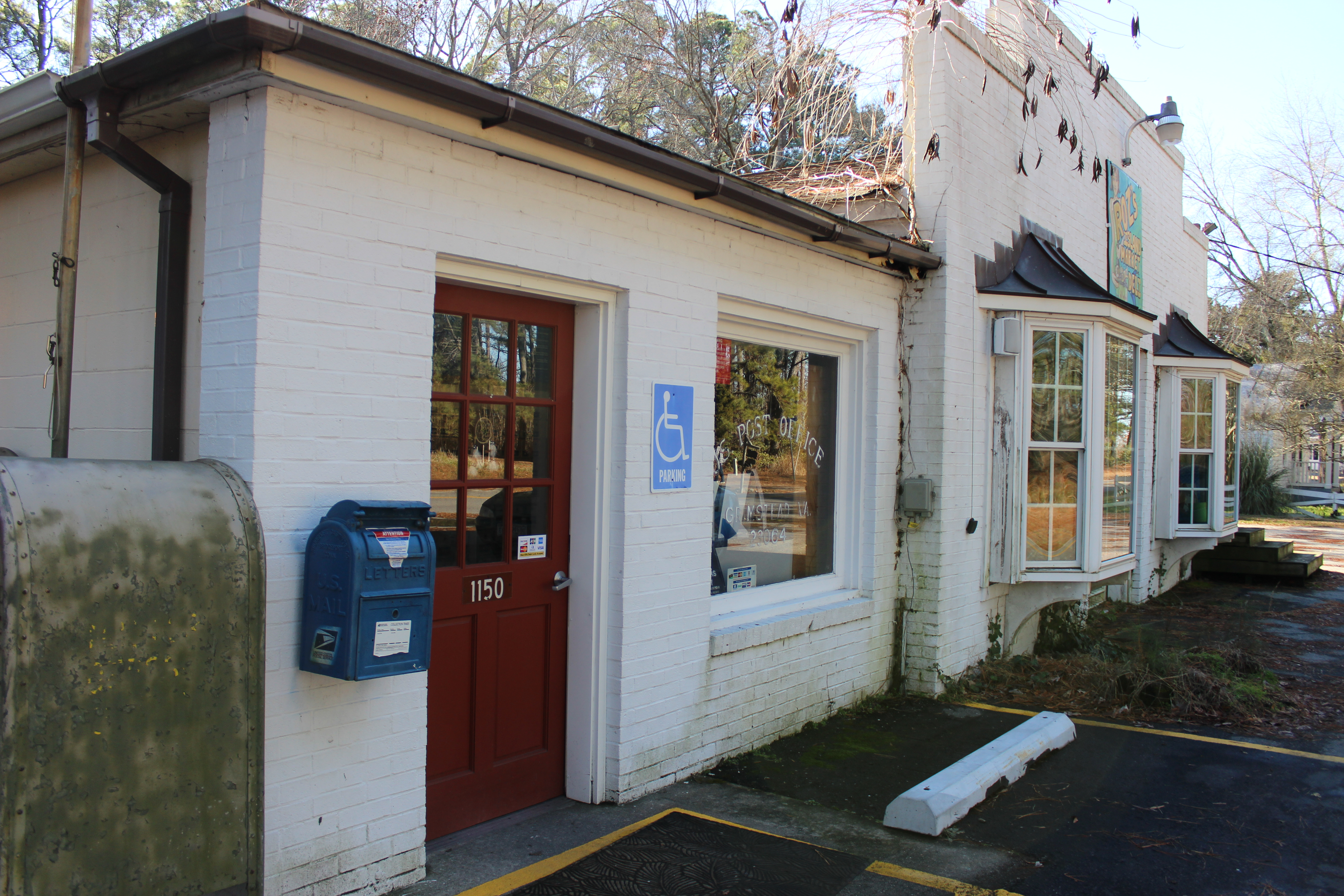
- Post office in Grimstead

- Location within Virginia Location within the United States
- Coordinates: 37°30′01″N 76°18′05″W
- Country: United States
- State: Virginia
- County: Mathews
- Elevation: 7 ft (2.1 m)
- Time zone: UTC-5 (Eastern (EST))
  - Summer (DST): UTC-4 (EDT)
- ZIP code: 23064
- Area code: 804
- GNIS feature ID: 1493042

Grimstead is an unincorporated community in Mathews County, Virginia, United States. Grimstead is located on Gwynn's Island, 4.5 miles (7.2 km) north-northeast of Mathews. Grimstead has a post office with ZIP code 23064.
