= Onemo, Virginia =

Unincorporated community in Virginia, US

Coordinates: 37°23′44″N 76°16′22″W

Onemo is an unincorporated community in Mathews County, in the U. S. state of Virginia.

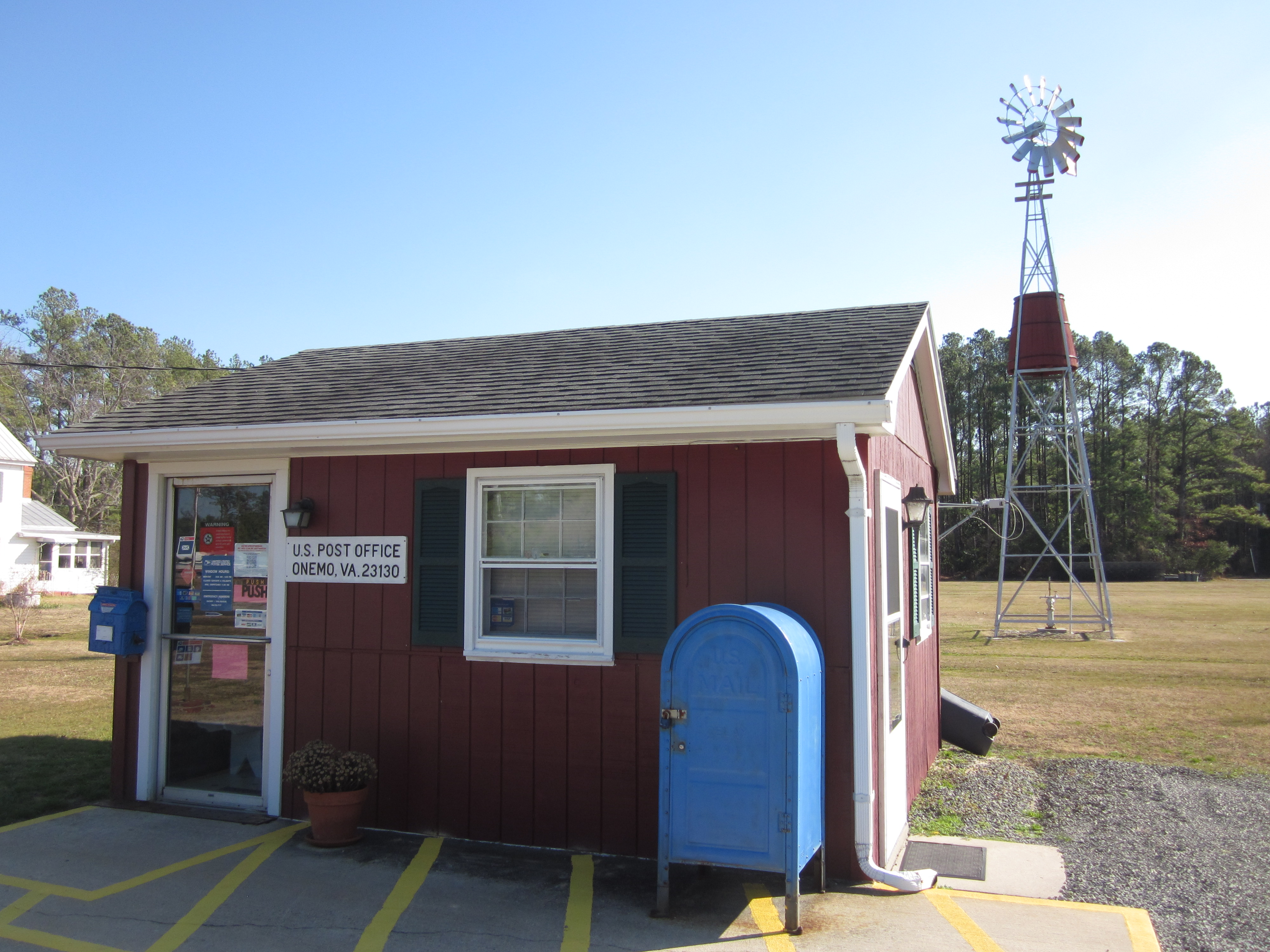
Onemo Post Office, 2012
