= Emma Lee Smith White =

American politician

Emma Lee S. White

Member of the Virginia House of Delegates for Gloucester and Mathews Counties
- In office January 8, 1930 – January 9, 1934
- Preceded by: John Tabb DuVal
- Succeeded by: John Tabb DuVal

Personal details
- Born: Emma Lee Smith; October 23, 1884 Albemarle County, Virginia, United States
- Died: February 17, 1983 (aged 98) Newport News, Virginia, U.S.
- Party: Democratic
- Spouse: Carl Clifford White
- Education: Central Female College; University of Virginia summer school American Correspondence School of Law

Emma Lee Smith White (October 23, 1884 – February 17, 1983) was an American teacher, insurance agent, newspaper reporter and politician who served in the Virginia House of Delegates for two terms, from 1930 until 1934, representing Gloucester and Mathews Counties.

== Early and family life ==
Born in Albemarle County, Virginia to Benjamin F. Smith and his wife the former Willie Ann Dunn, Emma Lee Smith was educated in the local private schools, then the Central Female College. She also took courses from the summer school of the University of Virginia and the American Correspondence School of Law in Chicago, Illinois.

She married Dr. Carl Clifford White in 1905.

== Career ==
Emma Lee Smith taught in public private schools in Virginia. After marrying Dr. Carl Clifford White (1868-1846) in 1905, they moved to his family's residence in Westville (also known as Mathews Court House) in Mathews County, Virginia before 1930. She was active in the local Parent Teacher Association, Kingston Parish and the Tidewater Fox Hunters Association. Mrs. White helped found the American Legion Auxiliary Post 83 (serving as its president from 1921 until 1925) and the Cricket Hill Chapter of the Daughters of the American Revolution, as well as the Young Democrat Club of Gloucester in 1932 and the Roosevelt-Garner-Bland Clubs of Mathews in 1932 and 1936. As of the 1930 census, her mother and a servant lived with the family. She was an insurance agent from 1925 to 1930 and again from 1934 to 1938.

Mrs. White succeeded Democrat John Tabb Du Val in the Virginia House of Delegates, representing Gloucester and Mathews Counties part-time for two terms beginning in 1930. He succeeded her in 1934, after a disastrous hurricane and 100 year flood destroyed much of the county in August 1933.

In her later years Emma Lee White was a newspaper reporter. The Mathews Journal (founded 1904) merged with the Gloucester Gazette in 1937 and maintained an office in Westville until 1954.

== Legacy ==
Emma Lee White survived her husband by several decades. She died, aged 98 after suffering from heart disease and diabetes in her old age, at Patrick Henry Hospital in Newport News, Virginia on February 17, 1983. She was buried at Kingston Parish's Trinity Cemetery in Mathews County. After she stepped down from the Virginia General Assembly in 1934, no woman again sat in the state legislature for 21 years.

Senate of Virginia
Preceded by John Tabb DuVal	Virginia House, Gloucester and Mathews; 1930-34	Succeeded by John Tabb DuVal
