= Cricket Hill, Virginia =

Unincorporated community in Virginia, US

Coordinates: 37°28′59″N 76°18′35″W

Cricket Hill is an unincorporated community in Mathews County, in the U.S. state of Virginia.
