= Old Point Comfort Light =

Lighthouse in Virginia, United States

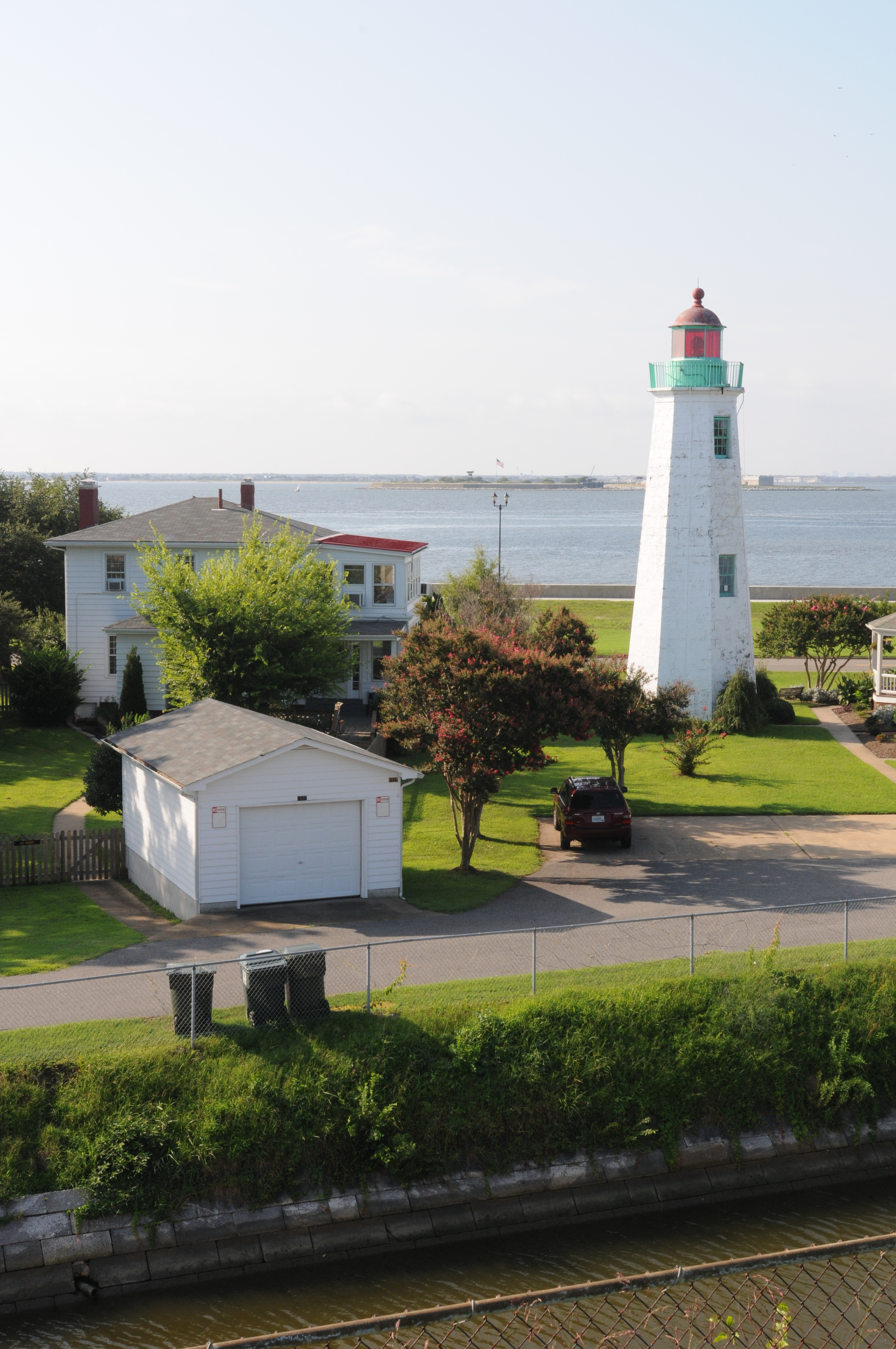
- Old Point Comfort Light (keeper's house out of frame to right)
- Location: Fenwick Rd., SW of E gate of Fort Monroe, Hampton, Virginia
- Coordinates: 37.00178°N 76.30643°W

Tower
- Constructed: 1803
- Construction: sandstone masonry
- Automated: 1972
- Height: 58 feet (18 m)
- Shape: Octagonal tower
- Heritage: National Register of Historic Places listed place, National Register of Historic Places contributing property, Virginia Historic Landmark

Light
- First lit: 1804
- Focal height: 16.5 m (54 ft)
- Lens: fourth order Fresnel lens
- Range: 11 nautical miles; 21 kilometres (13 mi)
- Characteristic: 12 sec double flash red
- Old Point Comfort Lighthouse
- U.S. National Register of Historic Places
- U.S. National Historic Landmark District – Contributing property
- Virginia Landmarks Register
- Area: 9.9 acres (4.0 ha)
- Part of: Fort Monroe Historic District (ID66000912)
- NRHP reference No.: 73002212
- VLR No.: 114-0021

Significant dates
- Added to NRHP: March 1, 1973
- Designated NHLDCP: October 15, 1966
- Designated VLR: June 20, 1972

Old Point Comfort Light is a lighthouse located on the grounds of Fort Monroe in the Virginia portion of the Chesapeake Bay. It is the second oldest light in the bay and the oldest still in use. The lighthouse is owned and maintained by the U.S. Coast Guard and is listed on the National Register of Historic Places.

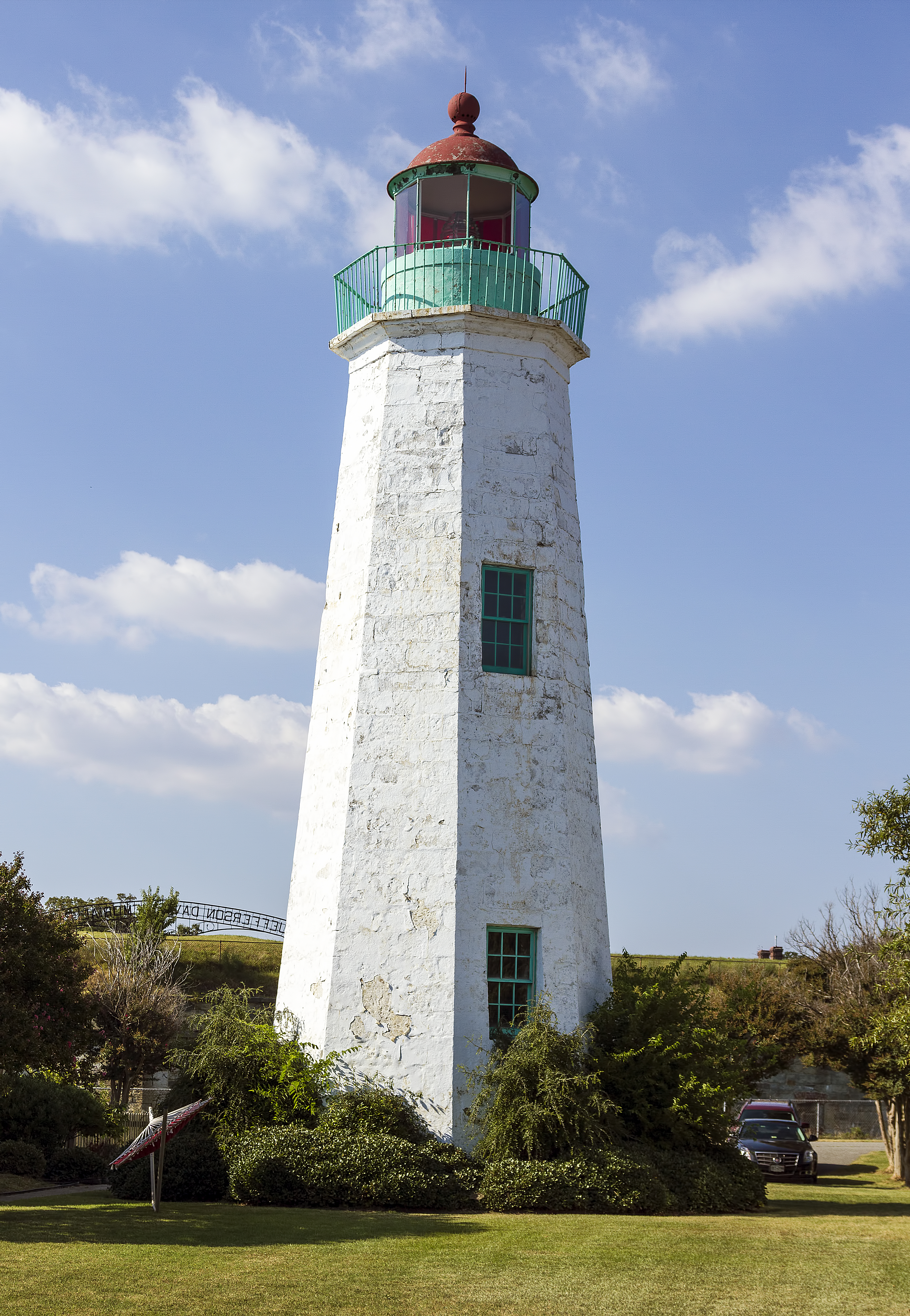
Old Point Comfort Lighthouse

== History ==
Records of aids to navigation at Old Point Comfort date to 1775, when John Dams was paid to maintain a beacon there. Its location at the entrance to Hampton Roads made it one of the first points designated for a light by the new United States federal government, and appropriations were made starting in 1800. The light was constructed by Elzy Burroughs and put into service in 1803, though a keeper's house was not built until 1823.

In the War of 1812 the light was one of several seized by British forces in their advance on Washington, DC. Following the war, Fort Monroe was constructed on the point, situated so that its walls were a short distance from the light. In the Civil War it escaped damage and extinguishing, as Fort Monroe was held by Union forces throughout. By this time the original lamp and reflector arrangement had given way to a Fresnel lens. Following the war consideration was made of deactivating the light, as development around the point had made it less conspicuous. The light was retained, however, and a program of improvements to the grounds and facilities toward the end of the century culminated in the replacement of the keeper's house with a new structure in 1891.

A variety of upgrades and innovations were applied to the light in the early twentieth century, including an experimental photoelectric control for the fog signal installed in 1936. The characteristic was altered several times as well. Red sectors in the lantern glass showed a white sector until the entire signal was made flashing red.

Upon automation in 1972 the keeper's house was transferred to the U.S. Army, which used it as a dwelling for Fort Monroe's Command Sergeant Major until the fort was closed in 2011.

The lantern is painted in an unusual combination of a red roof and green rails, decking, and walls. The light is still active.
