= Smith Point Light =

Lighthouse in Virginia, United States

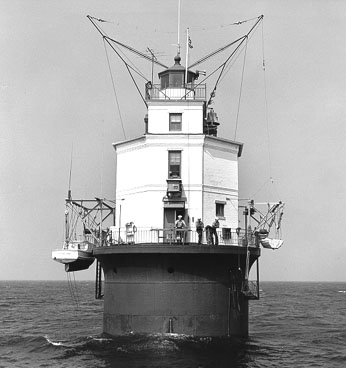
- Undated photograph of Smith Point Light, Virginia (USCG)
- Location: off west shore of the Chesapeake Bay, Virginia at the mouth of the Potomac River
- Coordinates: 37.8800°N 76.1839°W

Tower
- Constructed: 1897
- Foundation: pneumatic wooden caisson
- Construction: cast iron/Brick
- Automated: 1971
- Height: 52 feet (16 m)
- Shape: Octagonal
- Heritage: National Register of Historic Places listed place, Virginia Historic Landmark

Light
- Focal height: 16 m (52 ft)
- Lens: fourth order Fresnel lens (original), DCB-24 (current)
- Range: 16 nautical miles; 29 kilometres (18 mi)
- Characteristic: 10 sec flashing white
- Smith Point Light Station
- U.S. National Register of Historic Places
- Nearest city: Smith Point, Virginia
- Area: less than one acre
- Built by: US Lighthouse Board
- MPS: Light Stations of the United States MPS
- NRHP reference No.: 02001437
- Added to NRHP: December 2, 2002

Smith Point Light is a caisson lighthouse in the Virginia portion of the Chesapeake Bay at the mouth of the Potomac River. It was added to the National Register of Historic Places in 2002.

== History ==
Smith Point, at the mouth of the Potomac River, has been marked by a succession of lights, having been served by three towers, three lightships, a screw-pile lighthouse, and the present caisson structure. The first light, a stone tower, was erected by Elzy Burroughs on Smith Point itself in 1802. Erosion at the point was severe, and the light had to be rebuilt further inland in 1807 by Burroughs and his brother, William K. Burroughs. William had also been named the second keeper of the light in 1806. Again in 1828 the tower was rebuilt, this time by another builder. This last tower was finally abandoned in 1859, having been supplemented in the meantime by a lightship stationed off the point from 1821 onward.

As was the case with many others, the first lightship was destroyed in 1861 by Confederate forces in the Civil War. It was replaced in the following year by a refitted brig which served until 1868. In that year a screw-pile lighthouse was constructed off the point, in line with recommendations made some fifteen years earlier. The location is exposed, and ice damage (the bane of such lights) was inevitable. The light was first damaged by ice in 1893, and the keepers were fired for abandoning their posts. Two years later the house was stripped from the foundation and carried away.

Once again a lightship was stationed off the point, this time staying on station until 1897. In that year the existing caisson light was first illuminated. The plans for Wolf Trap Light were reused, so that the only obvious difference between the two is that Wolf Trap is painted red, while Smith Point is white. With various changes and repairs to the fog warning apparatus, the light was manned until 1971, a late date for a Chesapeake Bay light. A long submarine cable was run to shore to power the light, with a battery backup to handle interruptions. Damage to this cable in the 1980s brought the Coast Guard to consider discontinuing the light, but public outcry led to repairs in 1988.

In 2005 Smith Point Light went up for auction under the National Historic Lighthouse Preservation Act, and was purchased for $170,000 by David McNally, a builder from Winona, Minnesota. The light remains in service as an active aid to navigation.
