= Hudgins, Virginia =

Unincorporated community in Virginia, United States

Hudgins
- Unincorporated community
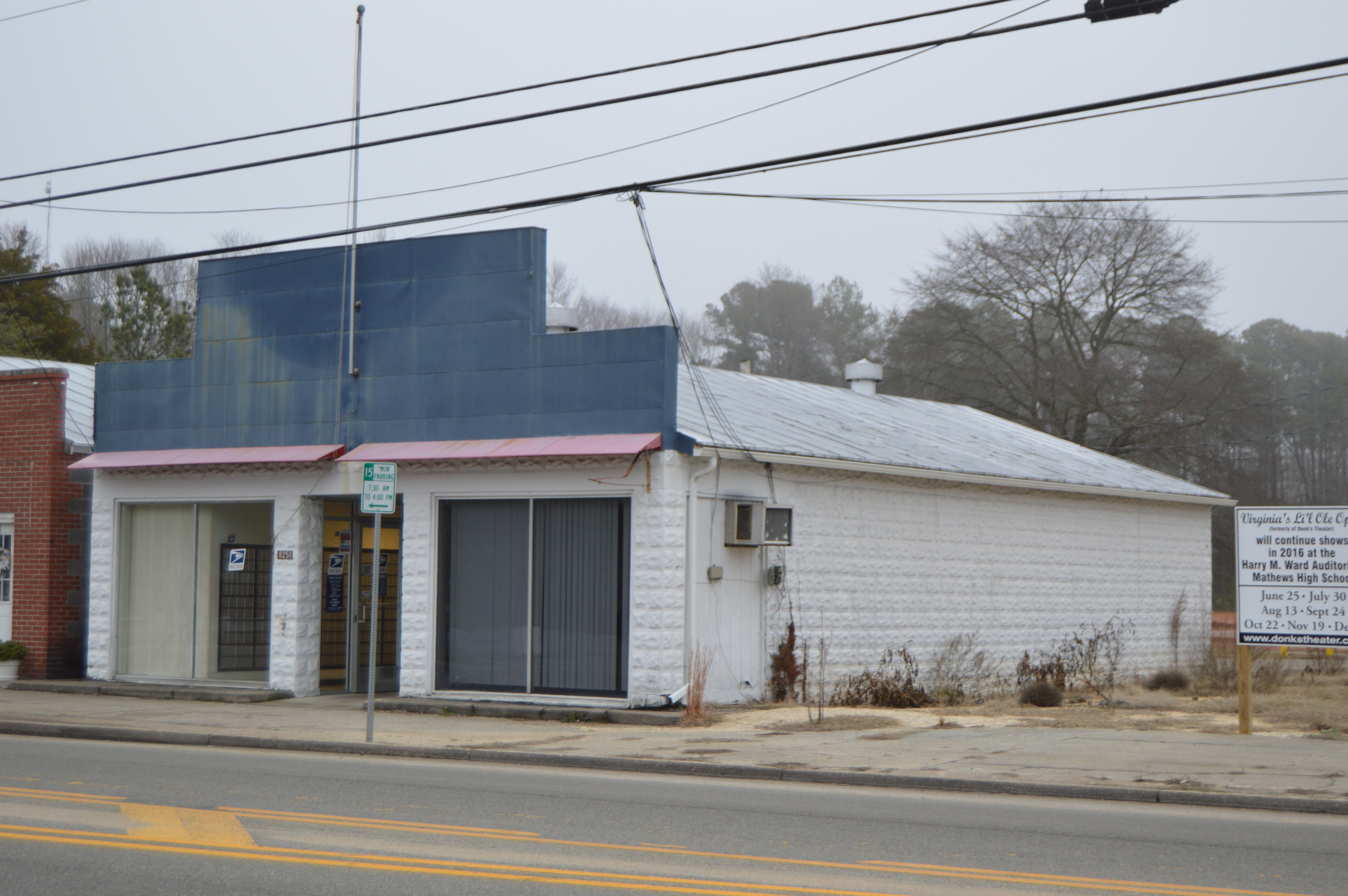
- Post office on State Route 198

- Location within the Commonwealth of Virginia Hudgins (the United States)
- Coordinates: 37°28′15″N 76°19′33″W
- Country: United States
- State: Virginia
- County: Mathews
- Time zone: UTC−5 (Eastern (EST))
  - Summer (DST): UTC−4 (EDT)
- ZIP Code: 23076

Hudgins is an unincorporated community in northern Mathews County, Virginia, United States. It lies north of the community of Mathews, the county seat of Mathews County. Its elevation is 10 feet (3 m). Although Hudgins is unincorporated, it has a post office, with the ZIP Code of 23076.

The community of Hudgins hosts United States Coast Guard Station Milford Haven and United States Coast Guard Aids to Navigation Team Milford Haven.

Donk's Theatre was listed on the National Register of Historic Places in 2011. In early 2016, the roof of the theater collapsed from the weight of snow and ice and the building had to be demolished completely.
