= Gwynn, Virginia =

- Census-designated place (CDP)
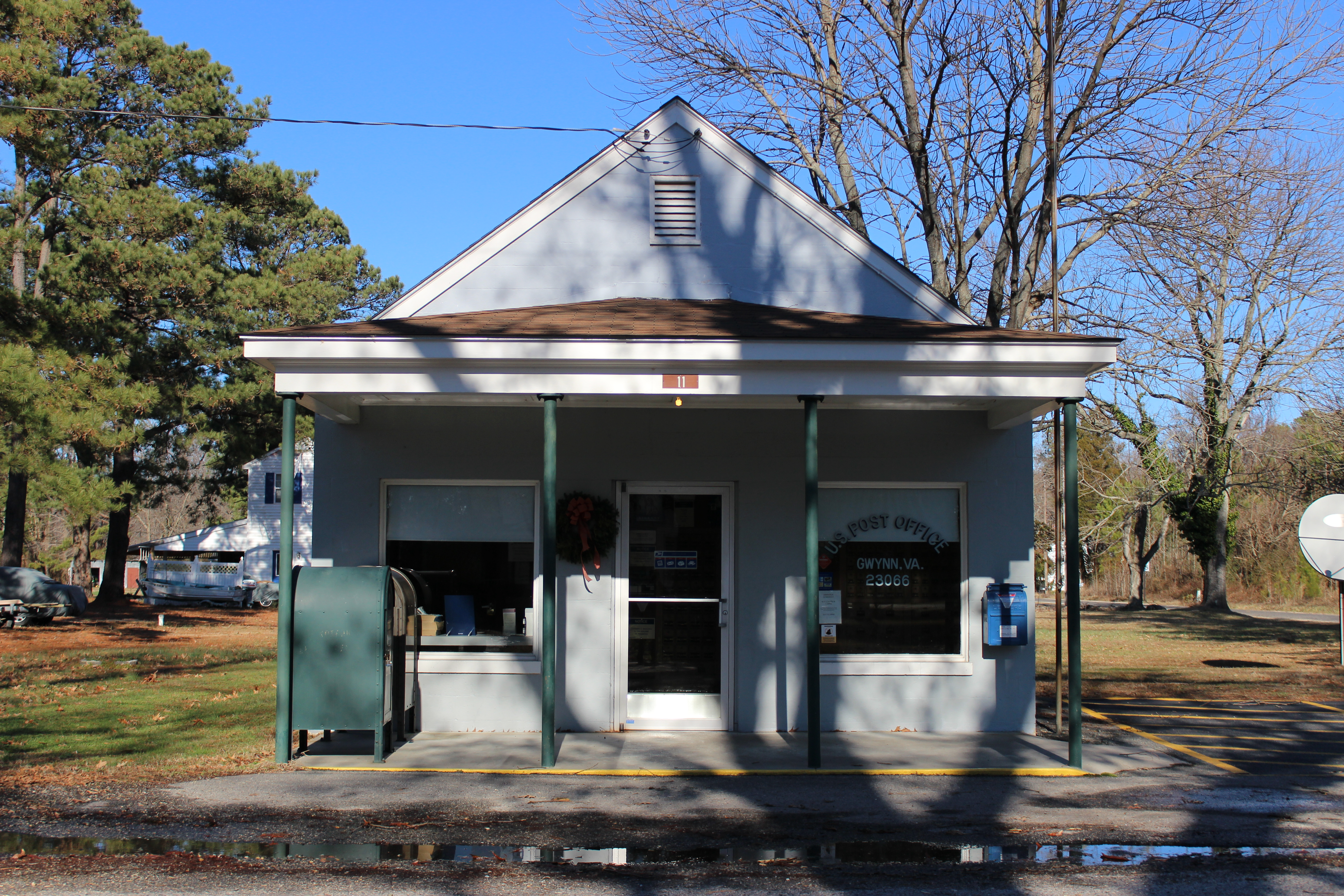
- Post office in Gwynn

- Location within Virginia
- Coordinates: 37°30′15″N 76°17′19″W
- Country: United States
- State: Virginia
- County: Mathews
- Elevation: 7 ft (2.1 m)
- Time zone: UTC-5 (Eastern (EST))
  - Summer (DST): UTC-4 (EDT)
- ZIP code: 23066
- Area code: 804
- GNIS feature ID: 1467619

Gwynn is a census-designated place (CDP) in Mathews County, Virginia, United States. As of the 2020 census, Gwynn had a population of 578. Gwynn is located on Gwynn's Island, 5 miles (8.0 km) north-northeast of Mathews. Gwynn has a post office with ZIP code 23066.

== Demographics ==
Historical population
Census	Pop.	Note	%±
2020	578		—
U.S. Decennial Census; 2010 2020

Gwynn was first listed as a census designated place in the 2010 U.S. census.
