= Gwynn's Island =

Island in the Chesapeake Bay

- Island
- Interactive map of Gwynn's Island
- Coordinates: 37°30′26.48″N 76°17′24.79″W
- Country: United States
- State: Virginia
- County: Mathews County
- Established: 1642

Population (2010)
  - Total: 602+
- Time zone: UTC−5 (EST)
  - Summer (DST): UTC−4 (EDT)

Gwynn's Island is an island in the Chesapeake Bay and the U.S. state of Virginia, lying off of the Middle Peninsula. A summer colony, the island is located in the northeast part of Mathews County, south of the mouth of the Piankatank River. It is connected to the rest of the county by a swing bridge over Milford Haven. The communities of Gwynn and Grimstead are located on the island.

== History ==
Archeological evidence found on Gwynn's Island indicates that the island was inhabited as early as ten thousand years ago. In 1642, Hugh Gwyn of Jamestown purchased the island; he and his family became the first English settlers there. On a 1670 map, the island was labeled "Wings Ile" and also "Guis Ile". In 1776, Gwynn's Island served as a base for Lord Dunmore, the last royal governor of Virginia, after the Burning of Norfolk. Bringing his army along with his Ethiopian Regiment and 2,000 blacks seeking freedom from slavery. They brought with them smallpox and typhus. Attacks by the revolting patriots led Dunmore to leave the island in the summer of 1776 leaving hundreds of blacks behind to die of sickness and starvation.

Map c. 1670 showing "Wings Ile als Guis Ile" [sic]

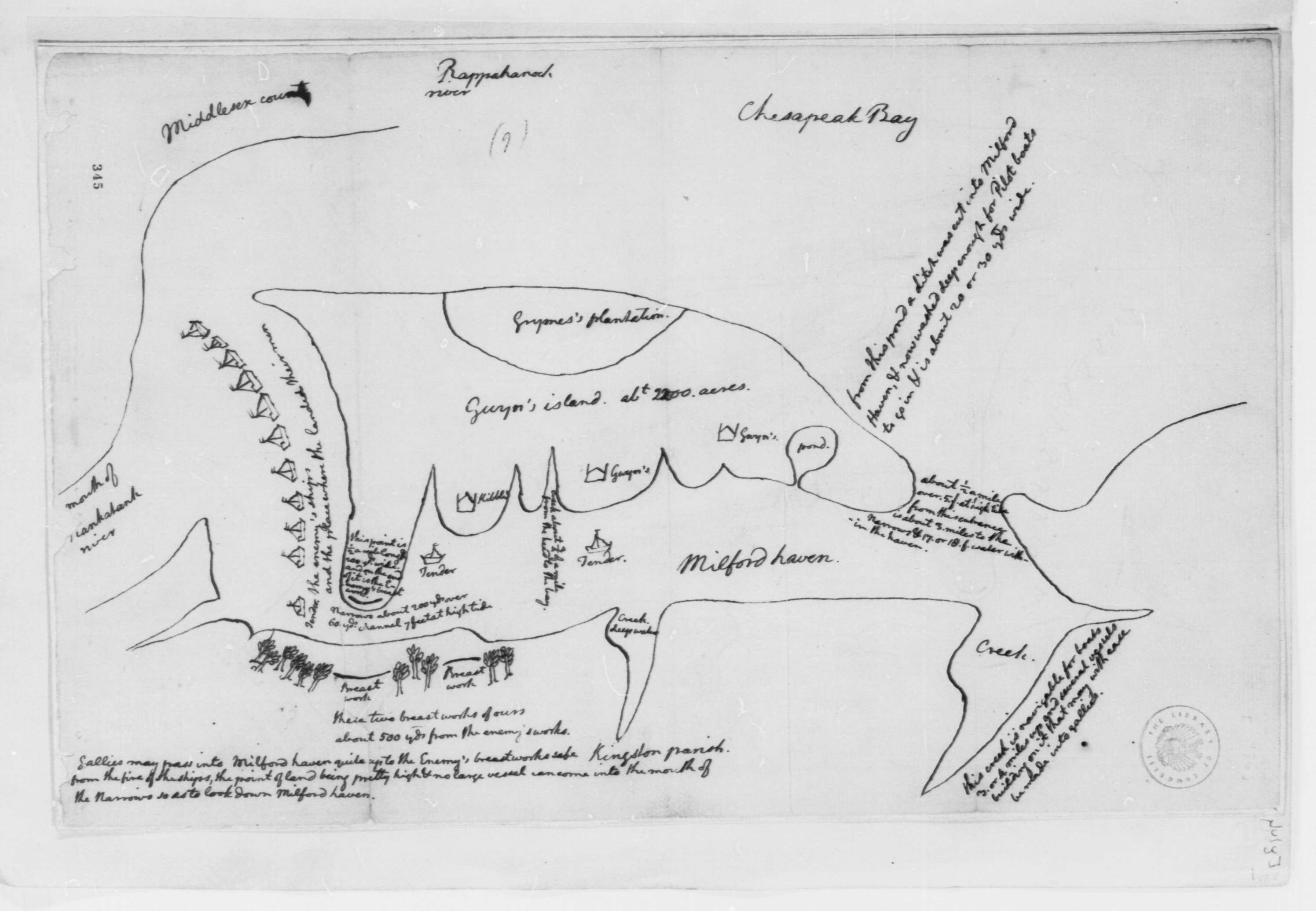
Map of action at Gwynn's Island, Chesapeake Bay 1776

During the attacks on Gwynn's Island in July 1776, the only casualty on the side of the revolutionaries was one Captain Dohickey Arundel, commander of two eighteen-pound cannons, who attempted to fire an experimental wooden mortar of his own invention, "though the general and all the officers were against his firing it". The mortar exploded on its first shot, killing Arundel instantly.

=== Early 20th-century exodus of Black residents ===
In 1910, Gwynn's Island was home to about 135 Black residents, many of them landowners, with their own church and school. Following a December 1915 altercation between Black and White men, threats against Black residents escalated, and by 1921 the island’s Black population had departed. The Virginia Department of Historic Resources attributes the exodus primarily to racial tension and fear for personal safety, while some local residents and officials have contended that economic factors also played a role.

In 2023, the Virginia Department of Historic Resources (DHR) approved a state historical marker titled "Black Exodus from Gwynn’s Island," summarizing the departure of Black residents in the 1910s. The marker was formally approved in 2024. Some Mathews County officials and residents opposed the marker’s language, arguing that economic conditions rather than racial tension caused the departures. In October 2024, the Mathews County Board of Supervisors voted to ask the DHR to rescind its approval of the marker.

== Present day ==
Thomas Edwards, a resident of the Island, is the Director of the Gwynn's Island Museum and has been at the helm since 2015.
