= Mobjack Bay =

Coordinates: 37°17′01″N 76°17′59″W

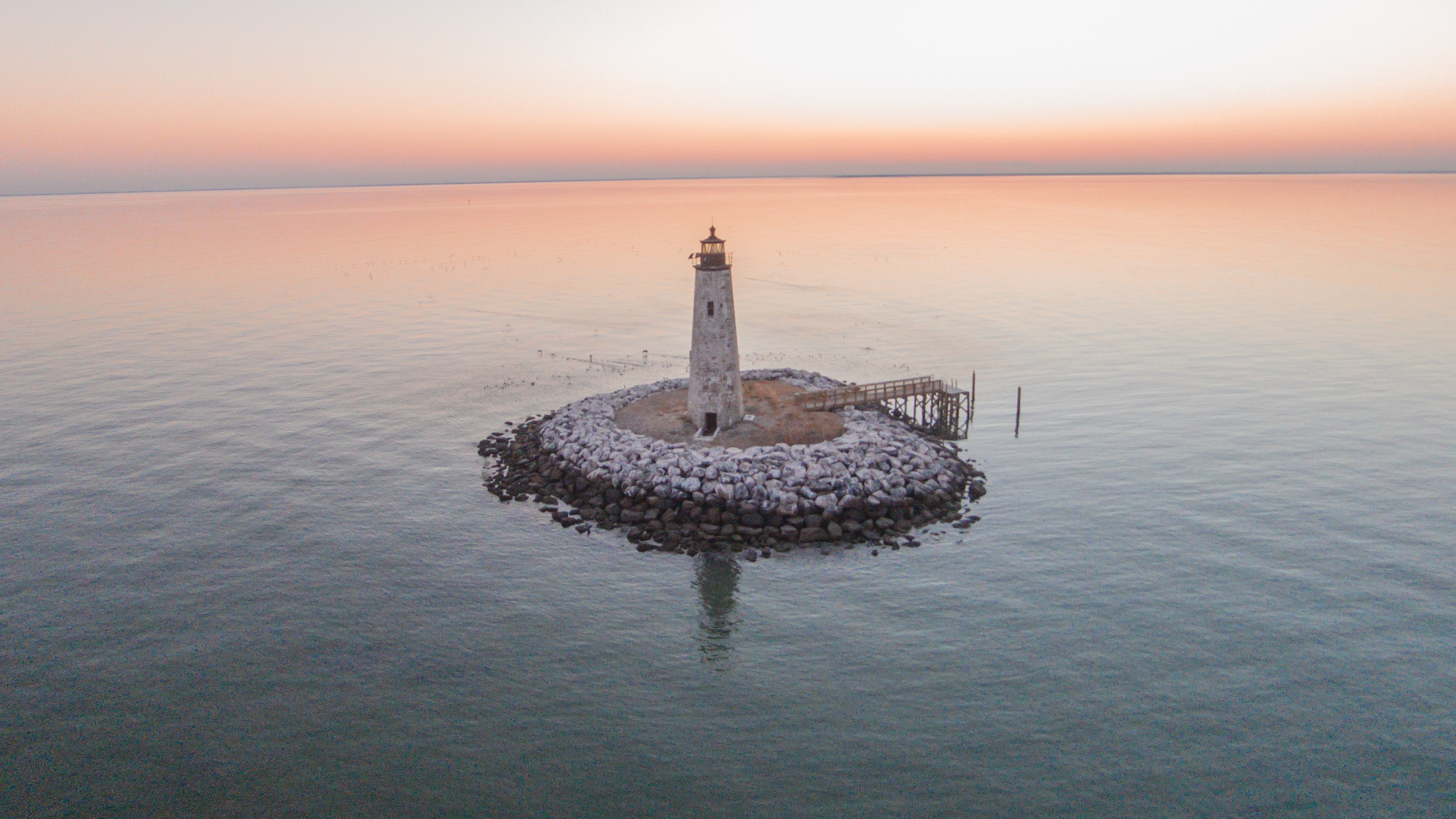
The New Point Comfort Light is located at the entrance of Mobjack Bay

Mobjack Bay is a bay on the western shore of the Chesapeake Bay in Virginia in the United States. It lies between the Rappahannock River on the north and the York River on the south. The bay appears in early documents as "Mockjack Bay"; it was said that echoes on the bay would mock "Jack", a term for a sailor. Captain Thomas Todd of Toddsbury, Gloucester County, a mid seventeenth century emigrant, was recorded as "Thomas Todd of Mockjack Bay".

The World War II United States Navy motor torpedo boat tender USS Mobjack (AGP-7) was named for Mobjack Bay.
