= Mathews County, Virginia =

County in Virginia, United States

- County
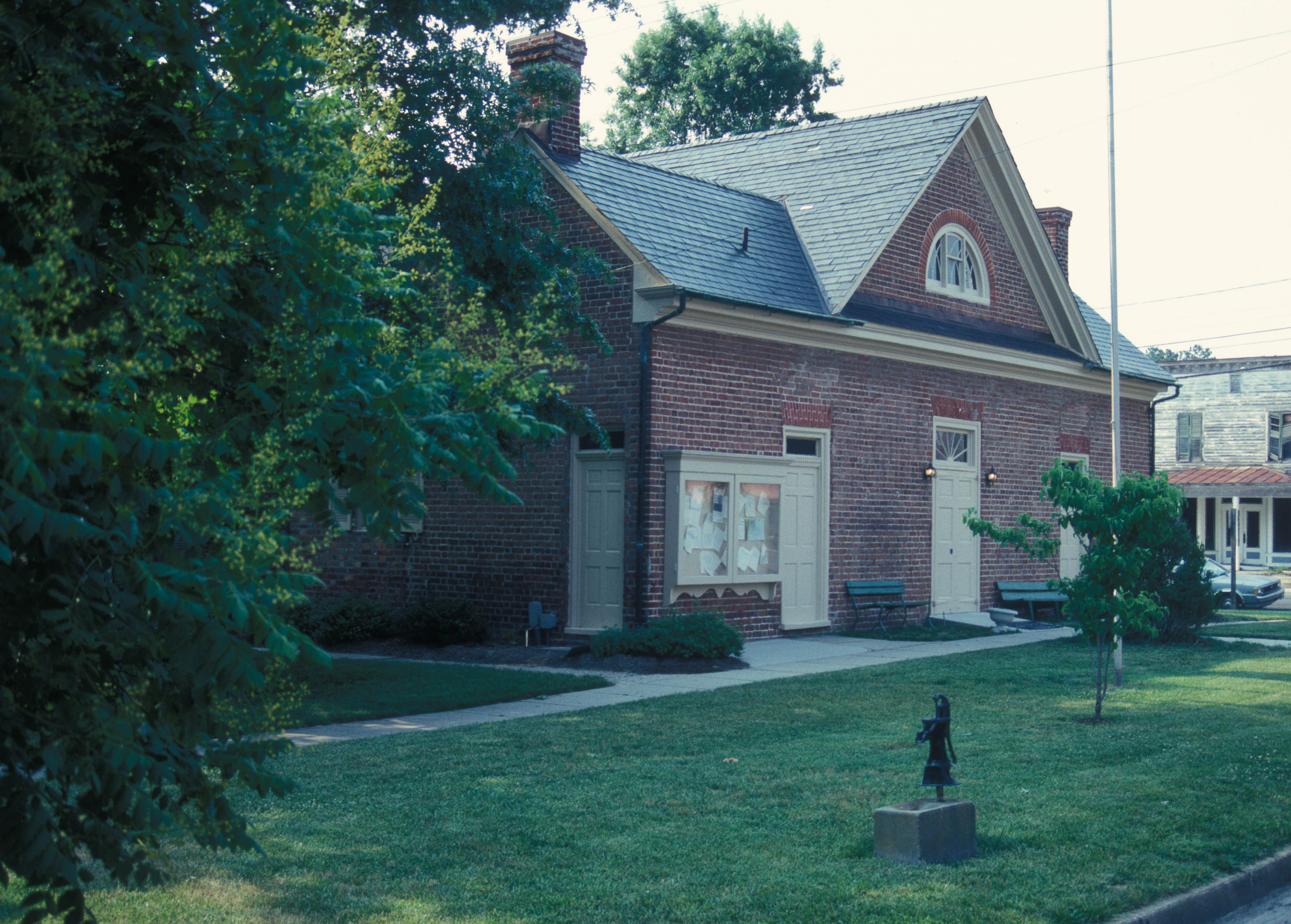
- Mathews County Courthouse Square

- Seal

- Location within the U.S. state of Virginia
- Coordinates: 37°25′N 76°17′W
- Country: United States
- State: Virginia
- Founded: 1791
- Seat: Mathews

Area
  - Total: 252 sq mi (650 km^{2})
  - Land: 86 sq mi (220 km^{2})
  - Water: 166 sq mi (430 km^{2}) 65.9%

Population (2020)
  - Total: 8,533
  - Estimate (2025): 8,529 ▼
  - Density: 99/sq mi (38/km^{2})
- Time zone: UTC−5 (Eastern)
  - Summer (DST): UTC−4 (EDT)
- Congressional district: 1st
- Website: www.mathewscountyva.gov

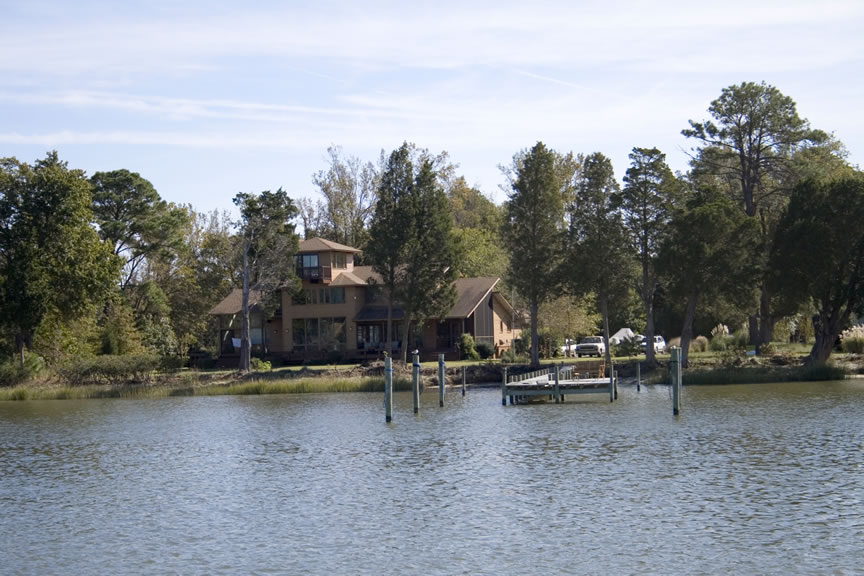
Typical waterside scene in Mathews County

Mathews County is a county located in the U.S. state of Virginia. As of the 2020 census, the population was 8,533. Its county seat is Mathews.

Located on the Middle Peninsula, Mathews County is included in the Virginia Beach-Norfolk-Newport News, VA-NC Metropolitan Statistical Area.

== History ==
During Virginia's colonial era, the area that later became Mathews County was part of Gloucester County. In 1691, the Virginia General Assembly had directed that each county designate an official port-of-entry. Established around 1700, the community of Westville was located along Put-in Creek(sometimes misspelled as Pudding Creek), a tidal tributary of Virginia's East River feeding into Mobjack Bay, which was a tributary of the Chesapeake Bay.

In 1776 during the American Revolutionary War, Virginia's last Royal Governor, Lord Dunmore, left Virginia after being pushed to the southeast to Gwynn's Island by General Andrew Lewis and the Continental Army. On July 8-10, 1776, in the Battle of Gwynn's Island General Lewis' forces bombarded Gwynn's Island from Fort Cricket Hill, and Dunmore's forces evacuated.

In 1791, after Virginia gained its independence from Great Britain, the Virginia General Assembly split Gloucester county and created Mathews County. The county was named for Brigadier General Thomas Mathews, then speaker of the Virginia House of Delegates. Thomas Smith Jr. and boatbuilder, planter and real estate investor Houlder Hudgins were its first two representatives in the Virginia House of Delegates. Westville was designated as the county seat (later it became known variously as Mathews Court House or simply Mathews).

Seaborne commerce, fishing and oyster farming had always been important in the area and Old Point Comfort Lighthouse was built in 1802 to guide vessels into the Hampton Roads seaport (along with the older lighthouse at Cape Henry). Two additional lighthouses were built slightly later: New Point Comfort Light and Smith Point Light. During the War of 1812, British vessels anchored in Hampton Roads and raided adjacent areas.

Farming was important to the 19th century economy, although decades of poor techniques had made growing tobacco unproductive in this area by the 18th century. Early in the 19th century Edmund Ruffin introduced using limestone marl as fertilizer on fields worn out from tobacco crops. Two Mathews County men implicated in Gabriel's Rebellion in 1802 were sentenced to transportation out of the Commonwealth. In a lawsuit begun in 1806, Jackey Wright of Mathews County was granted her freedom from prominent landowner Holder Hudgins due to her grandmother's Native American ancestry in one of the last cases decided by Judge George Wythe, with a Virginia Supreme Court opinion by St. George Tucker.

During the American Civil War, many men from Mathews County enlisted in the Confederate Army. Some Union sympathizers petitioned President Abraham Lincoln for help, alleging that Confederate sympathizers had harassed them. Union forces by 1862 controlled the Hampton Roads area and in July 1862 a detachment of Pennsylvania cavalry arrived at Gloucester Court House, then went to Mathews to arrest Carter B. Hudgins, but were unsuccessful. Several other Union raids occurred beginning in September 1863, initially designed to disrupt Confederate salt works. However, in the October 1863 raid, Union General Wistar later reported some of his troops behaved very badly, and Sands Smith was executed after he shot a Union soldier attempting to confiscate his cow. His son and grandson would become prominent Mathews County officials by century's end.

In 1882–1886, complaints about out-of-state watermen dredging local oyster beds (and destroying young oysters) produced an "oyster war" during the administration of Virginia Governor William E. Cameron. Several offending boats were captured, but all but one of their watermen were from Virginia's Eastern shore (across Chesapeake Bay) rather than from outside the Commonwealth.

During World War I, Mathews County greatly exceeded its quota of volunteers. In addition to fatalities, several men were disabled by gas attacks at the battlefront, and later relayed their stories. Many Mathews county seamen also served in the Merchant Marine. The war also changed economic relations within the county, for farm laborers could get better paying jobs in Hampton Roads or nearby cities.

As the Great Depression began, voters elected Emma Lee Smith White, wife of local physician Dr. Carl Clifford White, to represent them in the Virginia General Assembly. As a local insurance agent, among other jobs, she had other priorities after a hurricane and 100-year level flooding devastated Mathews County in August 1933. No woman again sat in the Virginia General Assembly for 21 years.

In October 2012, Hurricane Sandy also devastated Mathews County, and while rebuilding, officials decided to petition to have the town center declared a historic district. It received nomination from the Virginia Department of Historic Resources in 2016. The Mathews County Courthouse Square has been recognized as a National Historic District since 1977, and the Sibley's and James Store Historic District (consisting of two 19th-century general stores) has been recognized as a National Historic District since 2011.

== Geography ==
According to the U.S. Census Bureau, the county has a total area of 252 square miles (650 km^{2}), of which 86 square miles (220 km^{2}) is land and 166 square miles (430 km^{2}) (65.9%) is water. It is the second-smallest county in Virginia by land area.

Mathews County is perhaps best known for its miles of waterfront sites, as well as its prominent location on the Chesapeake Bay. Surrounded almost completely by water, it is bordered by Middlesex County to the north, separated by the Piankatank River and Gloucester County to the west. The southern side of the county borders Mobjack Bay.

=== Adjacent counties ===
- Middlesex County – north
- Gloucester County – south & west
- York County – south

== Demographics ==
Historical population
| Census | Pop. | Note | %± |
|---|---|---|---|
| 1800 | 5,806 | | — |
| 1810 | 4,227 | | −27.2% |
| 1820 | 6,920 | | 63.7% |
| 1830 | 7,664 | | 10.8% |
| 1840 | 7,442 | | −2.9% |
| 1850 | 6,714 | | −9.8% |
| 1860 | 7,091 | | 5.6% |
| 1870 | 6,200 | | −12.6% |
| 1880 | 7,501 | | 21.0% |
| 1890 | 7,584 | | 1.1% |
| 1900 | 8,239 | | 8.6% |
| 1910 | 8,922 | | 8.3% |
| 1920 | 8,447 | | −5.3% |
| 1930 | 7,884 | | −6.7% |
| 1940 | 7,149 | | −9.3% |
| 1950 | 7,148 | | 0.0% |
| 1960 | 7,121 | | −0.4% |
| 1970 | 7,168 | | 0.7% |
| 1980 | 7,995 | | 11.5% |
| 1990 | 8,348 | | 4.4% |
| 2000 | 9,207 | | 10.3% |
| 2010 | 8,978 | | −2.5% |
| 2020 | 8,533 | | −5.0% |
| 2025 (est.) | 8,529 | ▼ | 0.0% |
U.S. Decennial Census; 1790-1960 1900-1990; 1990-2000 2010-2013

=== Racial and ethnic composition ===
Mathews County, Virginia – Racial and ethnic composition Note: the US Census treats Hispanic/Latino as an ethnic category. This table excludes Latinos from the racial categories and assigns them to a separate category. Hispanics/Latinos may be of any race.
| Race / Ethnicity (NH = Non-Hispanic) | Pop 1980 | Pop 1990 | Pop 2000 | Pop 2010 | Pop 2020 | % 1980 | % 1990 | % 2000 | % 2010 | % 2020 |
|---|---|---|---|---|---|---|---|---|---|---|
| White alone (NH) | 6,537 | 7,112 | 7,995 | 7,835 | 7,250 | 81.76% | 85.19% | 86.84% | 87.27% | 84.96% |
| Black or African American alone (NH) | 1,415 | 1,159 | 1,036 | 822 | 658 | 17.70% | 13.88% | 11.25% | 9.16% | 7.71% |
| Native American or Alaska Native alone (NH) | 1 | 11 | 23 | 18 | 7 | 0.01% | 0.13% | 0.25% | 0.20% | 0.08% |
| Asian alone (NH) | 5 | 15 | 17 | 30 | 49 | 0.06% | 0.18% | 0.18% | 0.33% | 0.57% |
| Native Hawaiian or Pacific Islander alone (NH) | x | x | 0 | 2 | 15 | x | x | 0.00% | 0.02% | 0.18% |
| Other race alone (NH) | 2 | 2 | 9 | 1 | 25 | 0.03% | 0.02% | 0.10% | 0.01% | 0.29% |
| Mixed race or Multiracial (NH) | x | x | 54 | 166 | 332 | x | x | 0.59% | 1.85% | 3.89% |
| Hispanic or Latino (any race) | 35 | 49 | 73 | 104 | 197 | 0.44% | 0.59% | 0.79% | 1.16% | 2.31% |
| Total | 7,995 | 8,348 | 9,207 | 8,978 | 8,533 | 100.00% | 100.00% | 100.00% | 100.00% | 100.00% |

=== 2020 census ===
As of the 2020 census, the county had a population of 8,533. The median age was 54.3 years. 15.5% of residents were under the age of 18 and 31.0% of residents were 65 years of age or older. For every 100 females there were 95.8 males, and for every 100 females age 18 and over there were 94.0 males age 18 and over.

The racial makeup of the county was 85.5% White, 7.7% Black or African American, 0.2% American Indian and Alaska Native, 0.6% Asian, 0.2% Native Hawaiian and Pacific Islander, 0.8% from some other race, and 5.0% from two or more races. Hispanic or Latino residents of any race comprised 2.3% of the population.

0.0% of residents lived in urban areas, while 100.0% lived in rural areas.

There were 3,762 households in the county, of which 20.1% had children under the age of 18 living with them and 23.3% had a female householder with no spouse or partner present. About 28.6% of all households were made up of individuals and 16.8% had someone living alone who was 65 years of age or older.

There were 5,455 housing units, of which 31.0% were vacant. Among occupied housing units, 84.3% were owner-occupied and 15.7% were renter-occupied. The homeowner vacancy rate was 3.0% and the rental vacancy rate was 10.0%.

=== 2010 census ===
As of the census of 2010, there were 8,978 people, 3,932 households, and 2,823 families residing in the county. The population density was 108 inhabitants per square mile (42/km^{2}). There were 5,333 housing units at an average density of 62 units per square mile (24 units/km^{2}). The racial makeup of the county was 88.0% White, 9.2% Black or African American, 0.2% Native American, 0.3% Asian, 0.3% from other races, and 1.9% from two or more races. 1.2% of the population were Hispanic or Latino of any race.

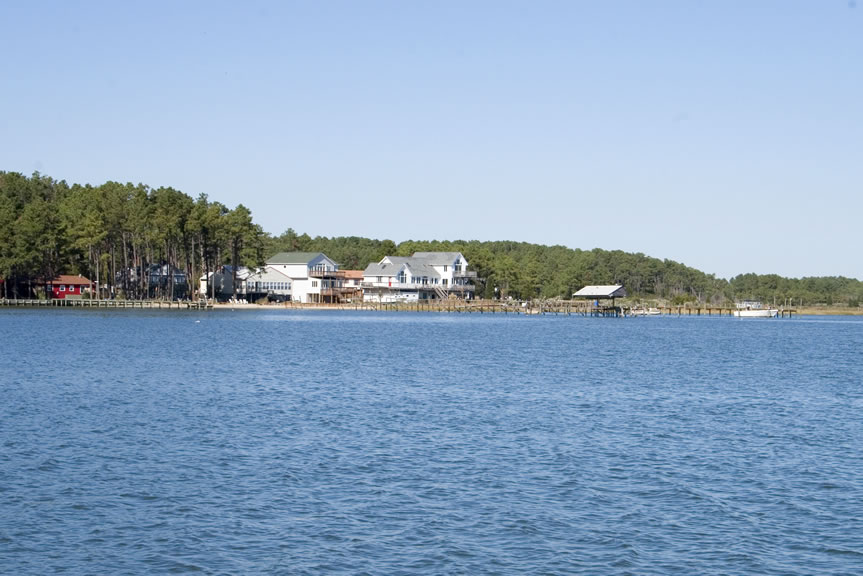
Houses on Horn Harbor in Mathews County

There were 3,932 households, out of which 24.20% had children under the age of 18 living with them, 61.20% were married couples living together, 7.90% had a female householder with no husband present, and 28.20% were non-families. 24.90% of all households were made up of individuals, and 13.50% had someone living alone who was 65 years of age or older. The average household size was 2.32 and the average family size was 2.75.

In the county, the population was spread out, with 19.90% under the age of 18, 5.20% from 18 to 24, 23.10% from 25 to 44, 30.10% from 45 to 64, and 21.60% who were 65 years of age or older. The median age was 46 years. For every 100 females there were 93.20 males. For every 100 females aged 18 and over, there were 91.70 males.

The median income for a household in the county was $43,222, and the median income for a family was $50,653. Males had a median income of $36,294 versus $23,434 for females. The per capita income for the county was $23,610. 6.00% of the population and 4.30% of families were below the poverty line. Out of the total people living in poverty, 7.50% are under the age of 18 and 4.80% are 65 or older.

Tourism, leisure, and fishing industries are the major sources of employment. Mathews County is one of the few counties in Virginia without a traffic signal. (Bath County is another.) Along State Route 223 at Gwynn's Island, there is a small drawbridge which is staffed 24 hours daily.

=== Ethnicity ===
As of 2016 the largest self-identified ancestries/ethnicities in Mathews County are:

- English – 32.3%
- Irish – 14.0%
- German – 12.8%
- American – 10.5%

== Communities ==
=== Census-designated places ===
- Gwynn
- Mathews

=== Other unincorporated communities ===
- Bavon
- Hudgins
- Moon
- North
- Onemo
- Susan

Prominent among Mathews County tourism and leisure locations is Gwynn's Island, a popular spot for recreational boating and sailing. It is located where the Piankatank River feeds into the Chesapeake Bay. Nearby is the offshore location of the historic New Point Comfort Light.

== Sports, events ==
Mathews County hosts the annual Tour De Chesapeake (due to its lack of hills except for the north section of the county near the Mathews-Gloucester border). The bicycling event is a benefit for the Chesapeake Bay Foundation. The community also sponsors Mathews Market Days, featuring local artists such as P. Buckley Moss.

Mathews High School is known for success in several sports including Boy's and Girl's Crew Teams, Boys and Girls Cross Country, Volleyball, Wrestling, Softball, and Track and Field. The Mathews wrestling team won the 1990 and 1991 state championship, boys track won the 1969 and 1986 state championships, the Mathews baseball team won the state championship in 2004, and the volleyball team won two consecutive state championships in 2011 and 2012. The Mathews crew team has also won many championships for Mathews including the Stotesbury Cup.

== Notable people ==
Captain Sally Tompkins was a Mathews County native. Gwynn's Island resident William B. Livermon Sr. appeared throughout the 1970s on television in religion segments as "The Circuit Rider". Mathews is also home to former NFL football player Stuart Anderson of the Washington Redskins and baseball player Keith Atherton of the Minnesota Twins.

Former Beatle John Lennon and his wife Yoko Ono once owned two historic waterfront estates in Mathews.

== Politics ==
United States presidential election results for Mathews County, Virginia
| Year | Republican | | Democratic | | Third party(ies) | |
| Year | No. | % | No. | % | No. | % |
|---|---|---|---|---|---|---|
| 1912 | 45 | 7.48% | 523 | 86.88% | 34 | 5.65% |
| 1916 | 90 | 13.76% | 549 | 83.94% | 15 | 2.29% |
| 1920 | 216 | 25.23% | 624 | 72.90% | 16 | 1.87% |
| 1924 | 195 | 22.08% | 678 | 76.78% | 10 | 1.13% |
| 1928 | 855 | 66.49% | 431 | 33.51% | 0 | 0.00% |
| 1932 | 488 | 42.29% | 652 | 56.50% | 14 | 1.21% |
| 1936 | 452 | 41.89% | 622 | 57.65% | 5 | 0.46% |
| 1940 | 349 | 36.85% | 592 | 62.51% | 6 | 0.63% |
| 1944 | 491 | 44.35% | 615 | 55.56% | 1 | 0.09% |
| 1948 | 490 | 47.53% | 458 | 44.42% | 83 | 8.05% |
| 1952 | 951 | 63.87% | 533 | 35.80% | 5 | 0.34% |
| 1956 | 1,018 | 65.42% | 406 | 26.09% | 132 | 8.48% |
| 1960 | 1,069 | 60.95% | 682 | 38.88% | 3 | 0.17% |
| 1964 | 1,149 | 50.26% | 1,137 | 49.74% | 0 | 0.00% |
| 1968 | 1,309 | 47.14% | 691 | 24.88% | 777 | 27.98% |
| 1972 | 2,164 | 72.45% | 730 | 24.44% | 93 | 3.11% |
| 1976 | 1,908 | 57.77% | 1,309 | 39.63% | 86 | 2.60% |
| 1980 | 2,204 | 59.31% | 1,300 | 34.98% | 212 | 5.71% |
| 1984 | 2,868 | 71.61% | 1,106 | 27.62% | 31 | 0.77% |
| 1988 | 2,752 | 67.52% | 1,235 | 30.30% | 89 | 2.18% |
| 1992 | 2,179 | 48.15% | 1,402 | 30.98% | 944 | 20.86% |
| 1996 | 2,206 | 51.78% | 1,602 | 37.61% | 452 | 10.61% |
| 2000 | 2,951 | 64.03% | 1,499 | 32.52% | 159 | 3.45% |
| 2004 | 3,497 | 68.18% | 1,589 | 30.98% | 43 | 0.84% |
| 2008 | 3,456 | 63.53% | 1,934 | 35.55% | 50 | 0.92% |
| 2012 | 3,488 | 64.91% | 1,807 | 33.62% | 79 | 1.47% |
| 2016 | 3,517 | 66.22% | 1,563 | 29.43% | 231 | 4.35% |
| 2020 | 3,901 | 66.96% | 1,825 | 31.33% | 100 | 1.72% |
| 2024 | 4,106 | 69.07% | 1,774 | 29.84% | 65 | 1.09% |

== See also ==
- National Register of Historic Places listings in Mathews County, Virginia
