= Mathews, Virginia =

Mathews
- Census-designated place (CDP)
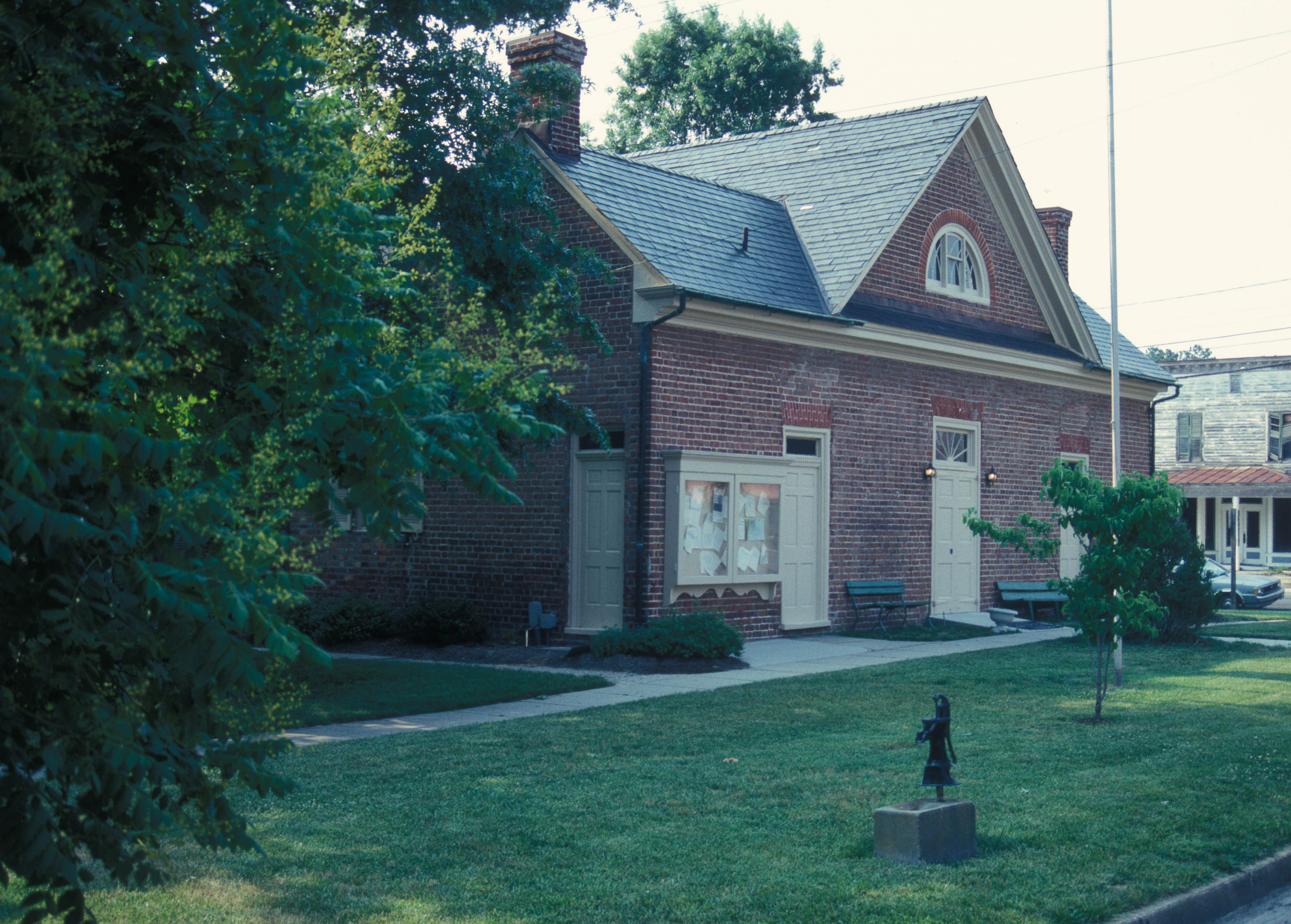
- 1790s courthouse

- Location within the Commonwealth of Virginia
- Coordinates: 37°26′13″N 76°19′12″W
- Country: United States
- State: Virginia
- County: Mathews

Population (2020)
  - Total: 525
- Time zone: UTC−5 (Eastern (EST))
  - Summer (DST): UTC−4 (EDT)
- ZIP Code: 23109

Mathews is a census-designated place (CDP) in and the county seat of Mathews County, Virginia, United States. As of the 2020 census, Mathews had a population of 525. Established around 1700, the small town of Westville was designated as the county seat in 1791. Today, it is variously known as Mathews Court House, as well as simply "Mathews," its official postal name.

== Demographics ==
Historical population
Census	Pop.	Note	%±
2020	525		—
U.S. Decennial Census; 2010 2020

Mathews was first listed as a census designated place in the 2010 U.S. census.
