= Donk's Theatre =

Historic movie theater in Virginia, United States

- Formerly listed on the U.S. National Register of Historic Places
- Virginia Landmarks Register
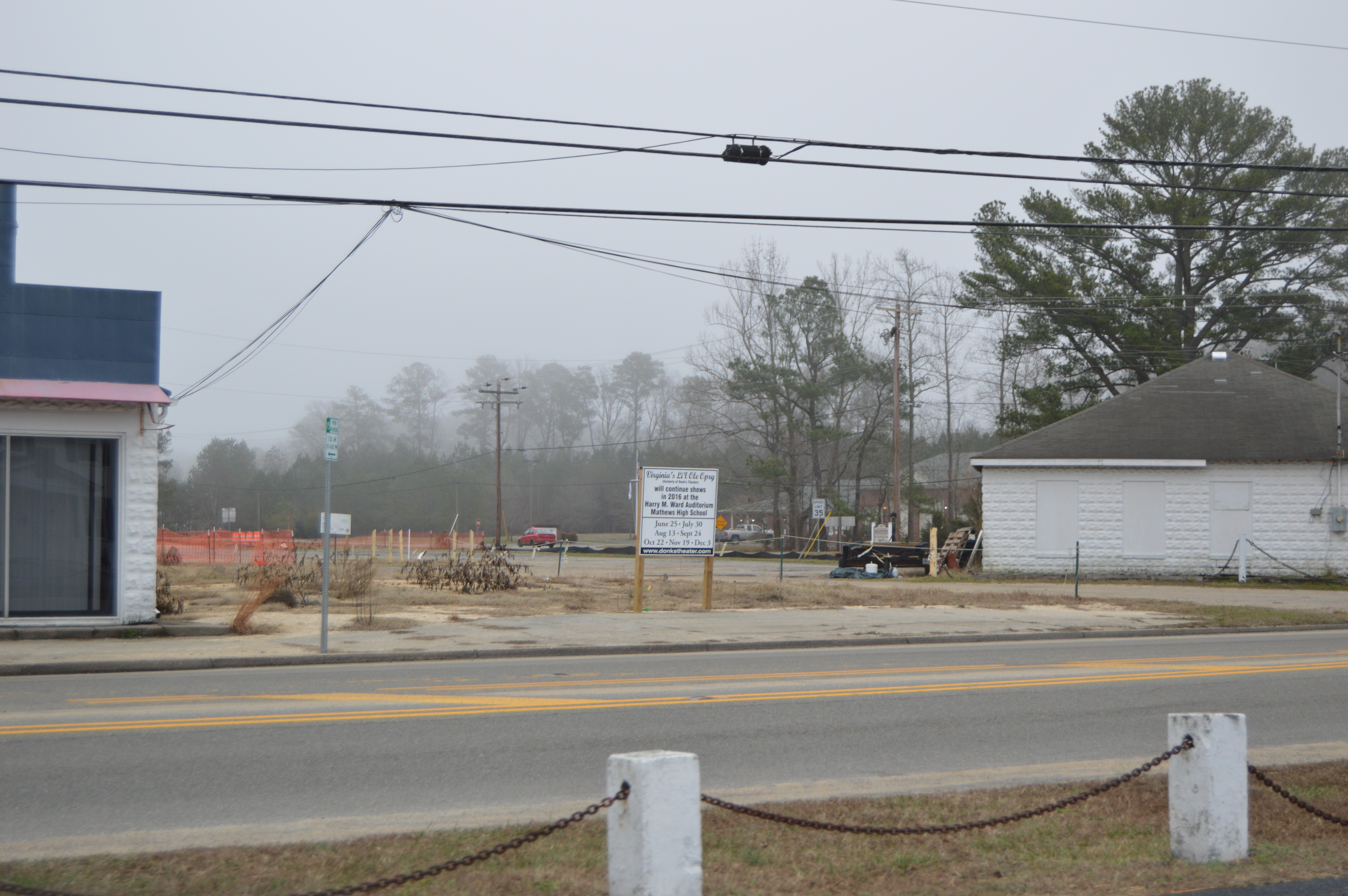
- Site of the former theatre in 2017

- Location within Virginia Location within the United States
- Location: 259 Buckley Hall Rd., Hudgins, Virginia
- Coordinates: 37°28′17″N 76°19′35″W
- Area: less than 1 acre
- Built: c. 1946-1947
- Architectural style: Art Deco
- Demolished: 2016 (collapsed)
- NRHP reference No.: 10001185
- VLR No.: 057-0069

Significant dates
- Added to NRHP: January 28, 2011
- Designated VLR: December 17, 2009
- Removed from NRHP: February 7, 2017

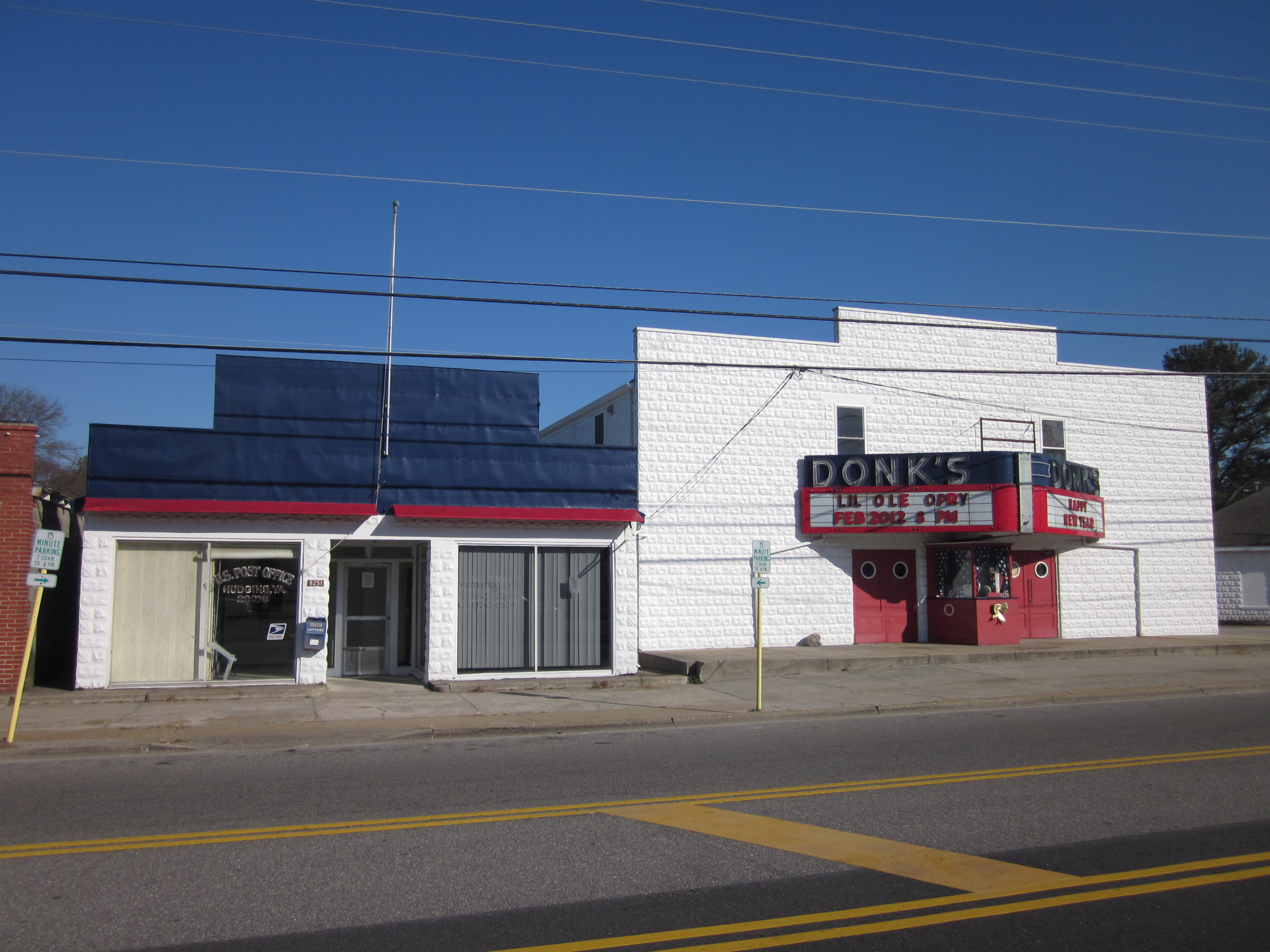
Donk's Theatre, 2012

Donk's Theatre was a historic movie theater located at Hudgins, Mathews County, Virginia.

== History and description ==
Donk's Theatre was built in 1946–1947, and was a vernacular rectangular building constructed of rusticated cinder and concrete block, painted white and cream with Art Deco style details. The building measured 50 feet by 100 feet, and consisted of the central theatre entrance, storefronts, and a 504-seat auditorium. The theater operated as a segregated venue for motion pictures until passage of federal civil rights legislation in 1964. In the following years the movie business was declining and the theater closed in 1970. It reopened in 1975, as a live country music concert hall. On January 22, 2016, the roof of Donk's collapsed due to heavy snowfall from a winter storm, as did several of the outside walls. Little survived, and what remained required demolition; the owners said that they would save the marquee.

The theater was listed on the National Register of Historic Places in 2011, and was removed from the National Register in 2017.
