= January 2016 United States blizzard =

Blizzard affecting the eastern United States

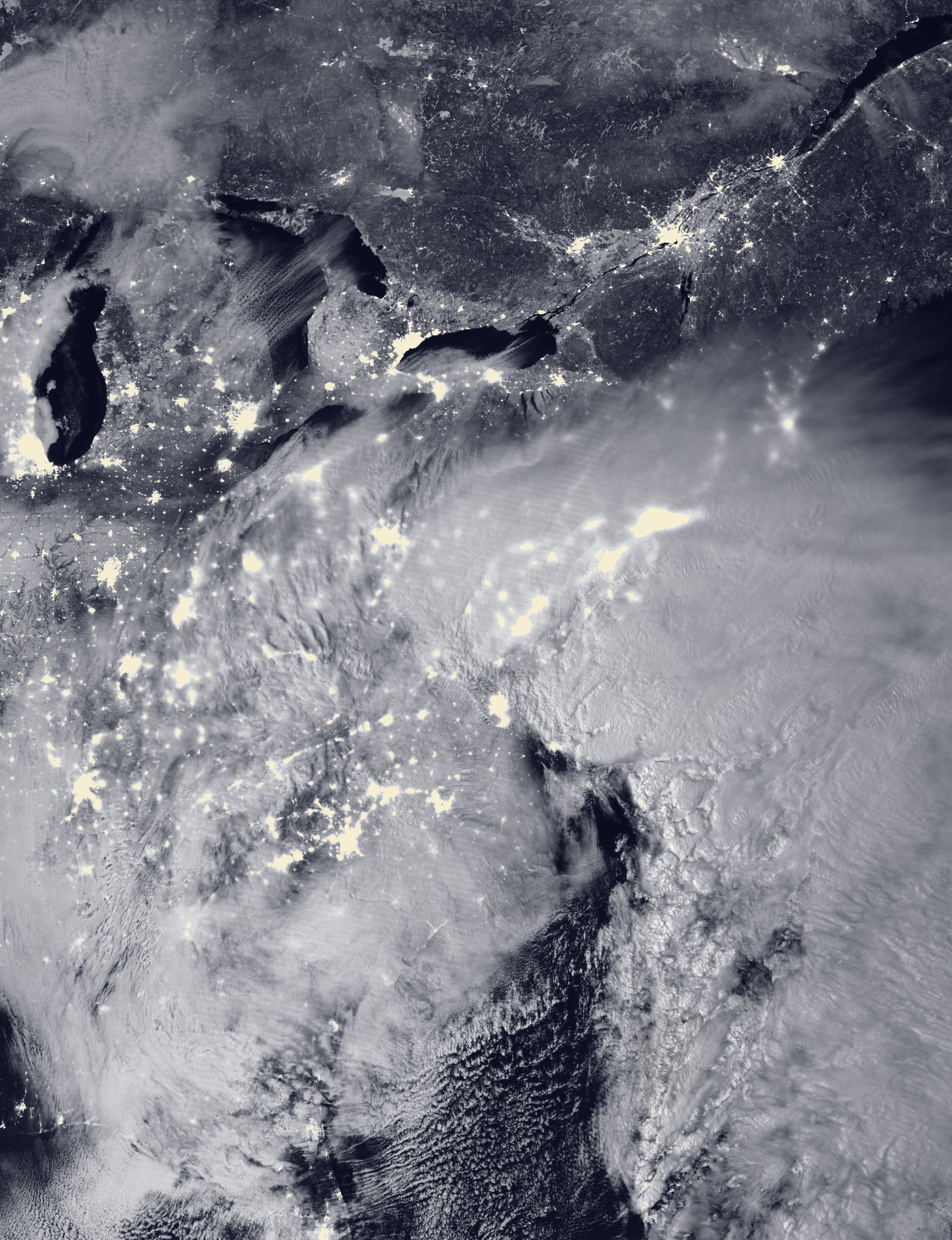
- The intensifying extratropical cyclone responsible for the blizzard over the Northeastern United States, at 2:15 a.m. EST (07:15 UTC) on January 23, 2016

Meteorological history
- Formed: January 19, 2016
- Exited land: January 24, 2016
- Dissipated: January 29, 2016

Category 5 "Extreme" blizzard
- Regional snowfall index: 20.14 (NOAA)
- Highest winds: 65 mph (100 km/h) (1-minute sustained winds)
- Highest gusts: 85 mph (135 km/h)
- Lowest pressure: 983 mbar (hPa); 29.03 inHg
- Max. snowfall: Snow – 42 in (110 cm) on Glengary, West Virginia; Ice – At least 0.75 in (19 mm) in western North Carolina

Tornado outbreak
- Tornadoes: 6 on January 21
- Max. rating: EF2 tornado
- Largest hail: 2.75 in (7.0 cm) in diameter in Wilmer, Louisiana

Overall effects
- Fatalities: 55
- Damage: $3 billion (2016 USD)
- Areas affected: Pacific Northwest, Great Plains, South Central to Eastern United States (especially the Mid-Atlantic states), Atlantic Canada, British Isles, Finland
- Power outages: 631,000+
- Part of the 2015–16 North American winter

From January 22 to 24, 2016, a deadly, historic and crippling blizzard, unofficially referred to as Winter Storm Jonas by the Weather Channel and other media, or more commonly the Blizzard of 2016 and Snowzilla, produced up to 3 ft (91 cm) of snow in parts of the Mid-Atlantic and Northeastern United States. A weather system, evolving from a shortwave trough that formed in the Pacific Northwest on January 19, consolidated into a defined low-pressure area on January 21 over Texas. Meteorologists indicated that a resultant storm could produce more than 2 ft (61 cm) of snow across a wide swath of the Mid-Atlantic region and could "paralyze the eastern third of the nation", and regarded it as a "potentially historic blizzard". Winter weather expert Paul Kocin described the blizzard as "kind of a top-10 snowstorm".

On January 20–22, the governors of eleven states and the mayor of Washington, D.C., declared a state of emergency in anticipation of significant snowfall and blizzard conditions. Approximately 103 million people were affected by the storm, with 33 million people placed under blizzard warnings. More than 13,000 flights were cancelled in relation to the storm, with effects rippling internationally. Thousands of National Guardsmen were placed on standby, and states deployed millions of gallons of brine and thousands of tons of road salt to lessen the storm's effect on roadways. A travel ban was instituted for New York City and Newark, New Jersey, for January 23–24.

Seven states observed snowfall in excess of 30 in (76 cm), with accumulations peaking at 42 in (110 cm) in Glengary, West Virginia. Ice- and snow-covered roads led to hundreds of incidents across the affected region, several of which resulted in deaths and injuries. At least 55 people were killed in storm-related incidents: twelve in Virginia; nine in Pennsylvania; six each in New Jersey, New York, and North Carolina; four in South Carolina; three each in Maryland and Washington, D.C.; and one each in Arkansas, Delaware, Georgia, Kentucky, Massachusetts, and Ohio. Total economic losses are estimated to be up to $3 billion. The storm ranked as a Category 5 "extreme" event for the Northeast on the Regional Snowfall Index, and a Category 4 event for the Southeast. It was the first winter storm to rank as a Category 5 winter storm since the 2011 Groundhog Day blizzard, and was the last to be rated as such until 2026.

== Meteorological history ==
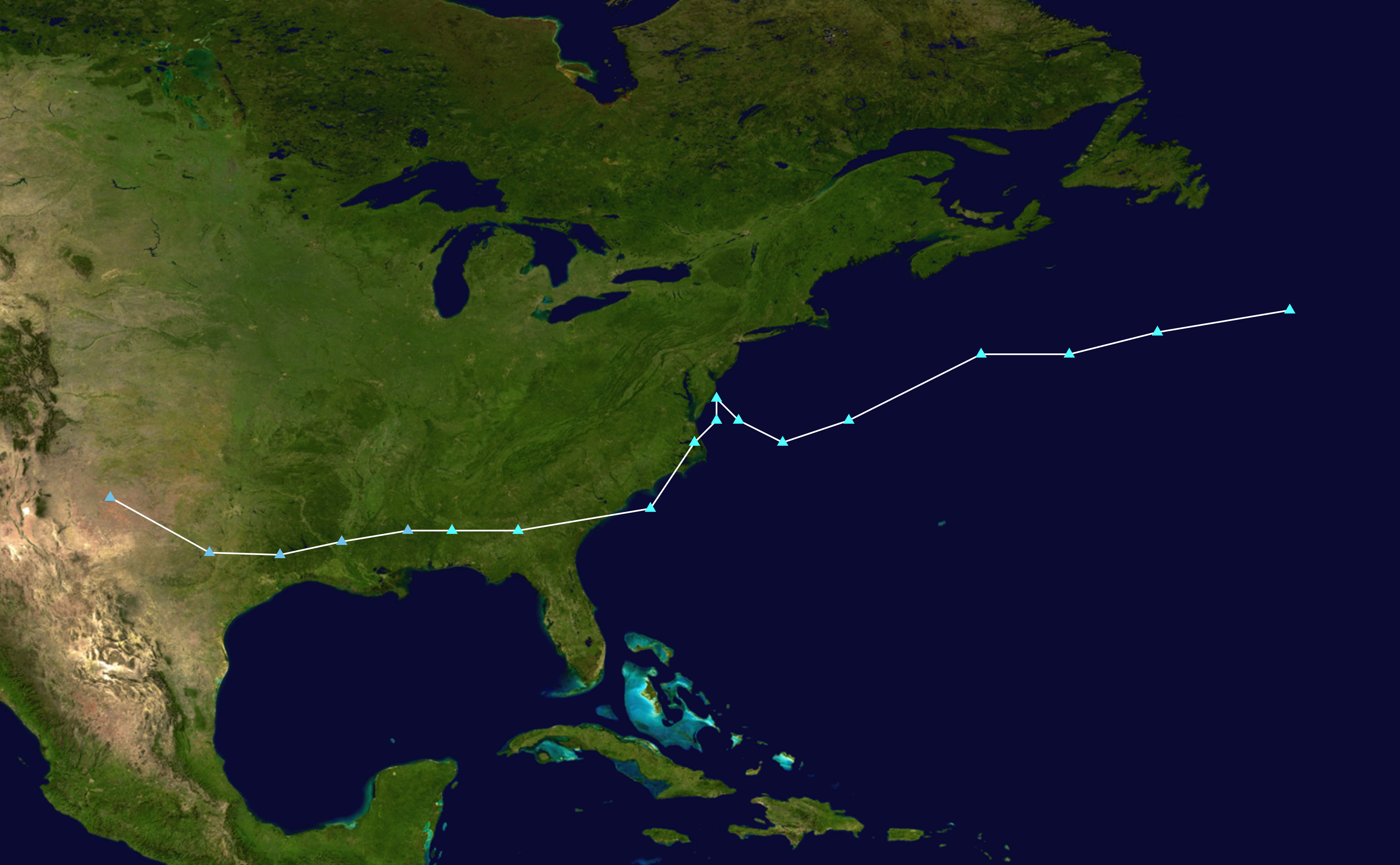
Map plotting the storm's track and intensity, according to the Saffir–Simpson scale Map key Saffir–Simpson scale Tropical depression (≤38 mph, ≤62 km/h) Tropical storm (39–73 mph, 63–118 km/h) Category 1 (74–95 mph, 119–153 km/h) Category 2 (96–110 mph, 154–177 km/h) Category 3 (111–129 mph, 178–208 km/h) Category 4 (130–156 mph, 209–251 km/h) Category 5 (≥157 mph, ≥252 km/h) Unknown Storm type Tropical cyclone Subtropical cyclone Extratropical cyclone, remnant low, tropical disturbance, or monsoon depression

The development of the winter storm was anticipated by forecasters for at least a week. It originated in a shortwave trough—a weather disturbance in the upper atmosphere—that came ashore at the Pacific Northwest on January 19. The trough strengthened as it moved southeastward through the Great Plains, and on January 21 it spawned a weak low-pressure area over central Texas. The incipient storm system began to intensify as it tracked eastward through the Gulf Coast states, triggering a line of strong to severe thunderstorms and multiple tornado warnings.

During the mid-afternoon hours of January 22, a new low-pressure area began to develop over the coast of the Carolinas, as the former storm tracked into central Georgia. Owing to uncertainty in short-range guidance but a high confidence of a sharp northern edge of precipitation, many forecasts were predicting 12 in (30 cm) of snow or less until just hours before snowfall began, from Allentown, Pennsylvania, toward New York City and the southern coast of New England. As the storm moved further north and rapidly strengthened, it became apparent that snowfall would be much higher farther north, and forecasters quickly began upgrading their totals. Early on January 24, as the storm was leaving New England, the system began to become elongated, as a secondary low developed to the southwest of the storm's central low. On January 25, the blizzard left the East Coast of the United States; on the same day, the system was named Karin by the University of Berlin.

Accompanied by a strong jet stream in the Atlantic, the remnants of the storm crossed the British Isles on January 26. The wind and rain associated with the low was forecast to have the potential to cause disruption in the United Kingdom, and indeed there were areas that saw severe weather. During the next few days, the system accelerated towards the northeast. On January 29, the storm system was absorbed by Windstorm Leone, over Finland.

== Preparations ==
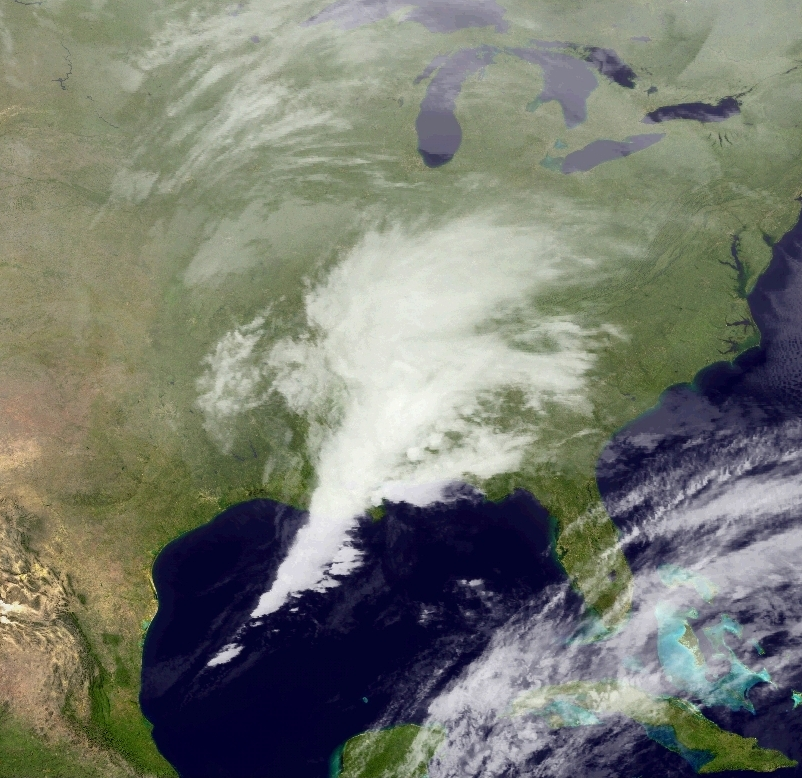
The developing storm system at 9:30 p.m. EST on January 21 (02:30 UTC, January 22), over the southern United States

Multiple offices of the National Weather Service issued various watches and warnings across the storm's projected path. Blizzard warnings covered coastal Connecticut; most of Delaware; most of Maryland; Massachusetts, particularly Martha's Vineyard; most of New Jersey; New York, including New York City; Pennsylvania; Rhode Island, especially Block Island; Virginia; and Washington, D.C. Winter storm warnings were issued from Arkansas to Massachusetts, including parts of Connecticut, northern Georgia, extreme southern Illinois, extreme southern Indiana, the entirety of Kentucky, extreme northeastern Louisiana, southeastern Massachusetts, northeastern Mississippi, extreme southeastern Missouri, extreme southern New York, most of North Carolina, southern Ohio, southern Rhode Island, northern South Carolina, most of Tennessee, most of Virginia, and all of West Virginia. Freezing rain advisories covered parts of North and South Carolina. Further winter weather advisories covered additional portions of the country, including eastern Kansas, southeastern Missouri, and northern Alabama. Offshore, storm warnings covered areas from Georgia to Maine.

On January 21–22, the governors of Delaware, Georgia, Kentucky, Maryland, New York, New Jersey, North Carolina, Virginia, Pennsylvania, Tennessee, West Virginia, and the mayor of Washington, D.C., declared a state of emergency in anticipation of significant snowfall and blizzard conditions.

Airlines cancelled more than 1,000 flights, with hundreds more preemptively grounded, by the afternoon of January 21 for January 22–24. Ripple effect cancellations spread across the entire East Coast. By the afternoon of January 23, more than 10,100 flights were cancelled across the country, affecting well over 100,000 travelers. Nearly 2,000 more flights were delayed. Most airports in the Mid-Atlantic region suspended service altogether, with Baltimore–Washington International, Philadelphia International Airport, Ronald Reagan Washington National, and Washington Dulles International closed through the evening of January 24. Flights to and from LaGuardia, John F. Kennedy International, and Newark Liberty International were largely cancelled as well. American Airlines suspended all flights departing from Charlotte-Douglas International Airport, causing a ripple of flights being cancelled throughout the country. Effects rippled internationally, with more than 100 flights in Canada, Mexico, and the United Kingdom cancelled. Altogether, 13,046 flights were cancelled between January 22 and 26. Amtrak suspended service for many lines, including the Crescent service from New York City to New Orleans; the Cardinal to Chicago; and the Silver Meteor to Miami.

Multiple sporting events, including those held by the Atlantic Coast Conference, National Basketball Association, and the National Hockey League, were postponed by the storm, while the National Football League's Arizona Cardinals vs. Carolina Panthers NFC Championship went on as planned for January 24 in Charlotte.

=== Mid-Atlantic ===
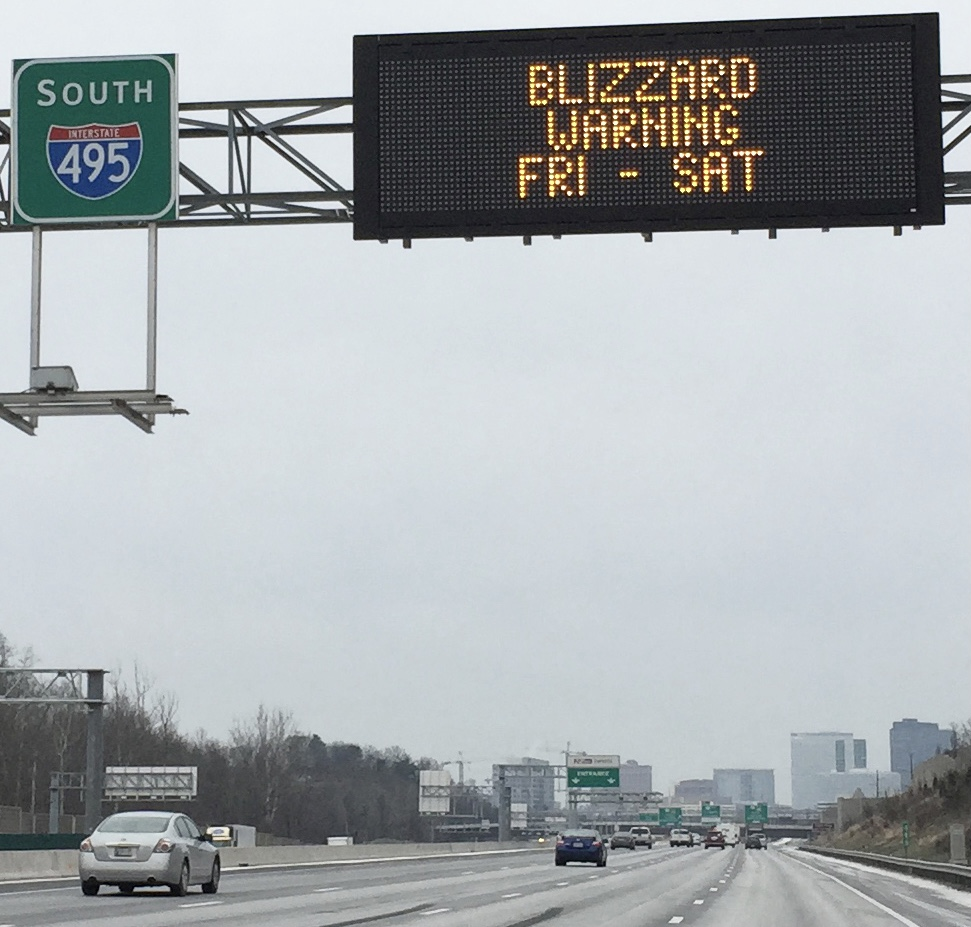
Variable-message highway signs in Maryland and Virginia displayed warnings of the impending blizzard

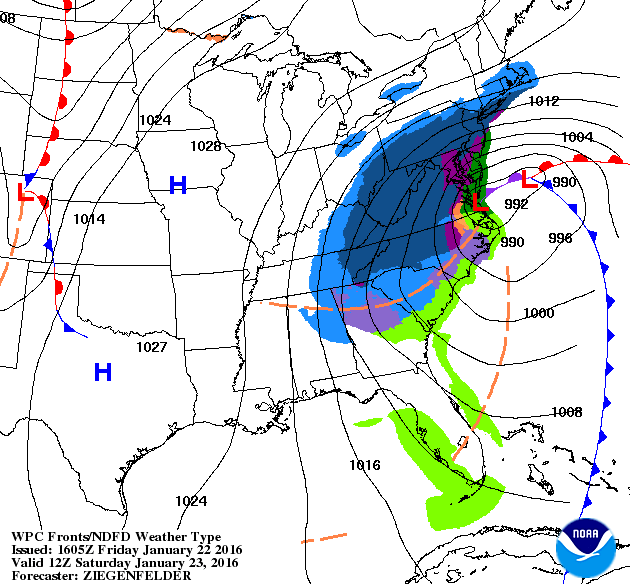
Forecast of expected weather conditions across the eastern United States for Saturday, January 23. Blue indicates snow, green indicates rain, and purple indicates mixed precipitation. Darker shades denote heavier precipitation.

A snow emergency was declared for Washington, D.C., meaning that residents would not be allowed to park on snow emergency routes after 9:30 p.m. local time on January 22. Mayor Bowser urged people to remain home during the storm, "[u]nless you absolutely have to be out tomorrow afternoon [January 22], residents should get home as soon as possible". Across Maryland, 2,700 pieces of snow equipment were mobilized and crews planned to distribute 365,000 tons of road salt. In Virginia, 500 vehicles were deployed to treat roads and 500 members of the Virginia National Guard were placed on standby. Schools across the D.C. area were scheduled to end classes early on January 22, before the storm's arrival. Stores across Maryland, Virginia, and Washington, D.C., reported a substantial uptick in sales, with groceries, heaters, shovels, and similar items sold out in numerous locations. West Virginia Governor Earl Ray Tomblin mobilized the state's National Guard on January 21.

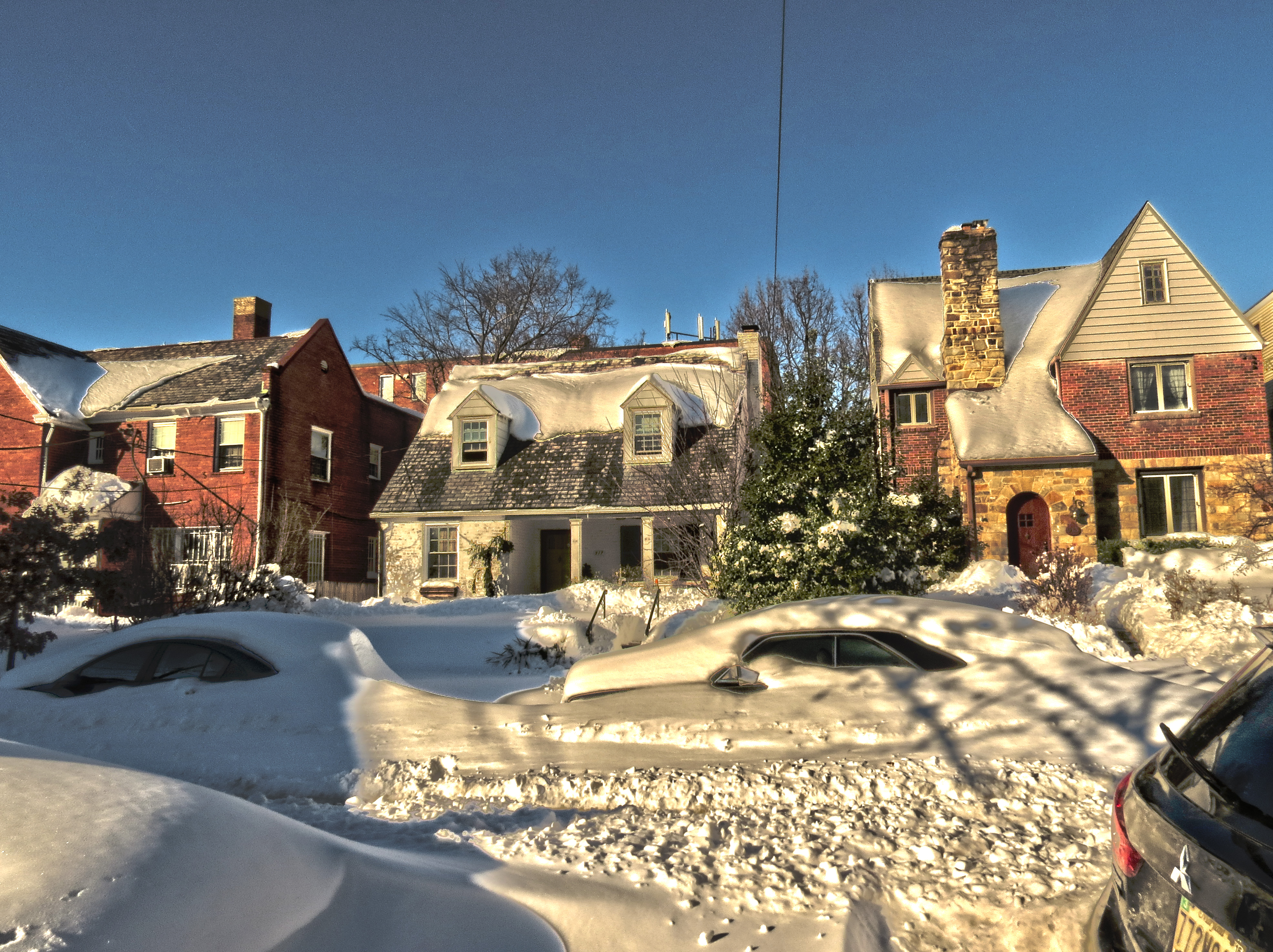
Cars buried in snow in suburban Washington, DC.

The Washington Metropolitan Area Transit Authority (WMATA) announced on January 21 that it would shut down its entire mass transit system over the weekend of January 22 and 23, including the Washington Metro and Metrobus, making it the longest such shutdown in the agency's history. On January 25, the WMATA operated limited Metro bus service, as well as rail service only on the underground portions of the Red, Green, and Orange Lines; however, fares were not charged. In Richmond, Virginia, all flights out of Richmond International Airport on January 23 were cancelled, and the Greater Richmond Transit Company (GTRC) bus system took the rare step of suspending all routes on January 24.

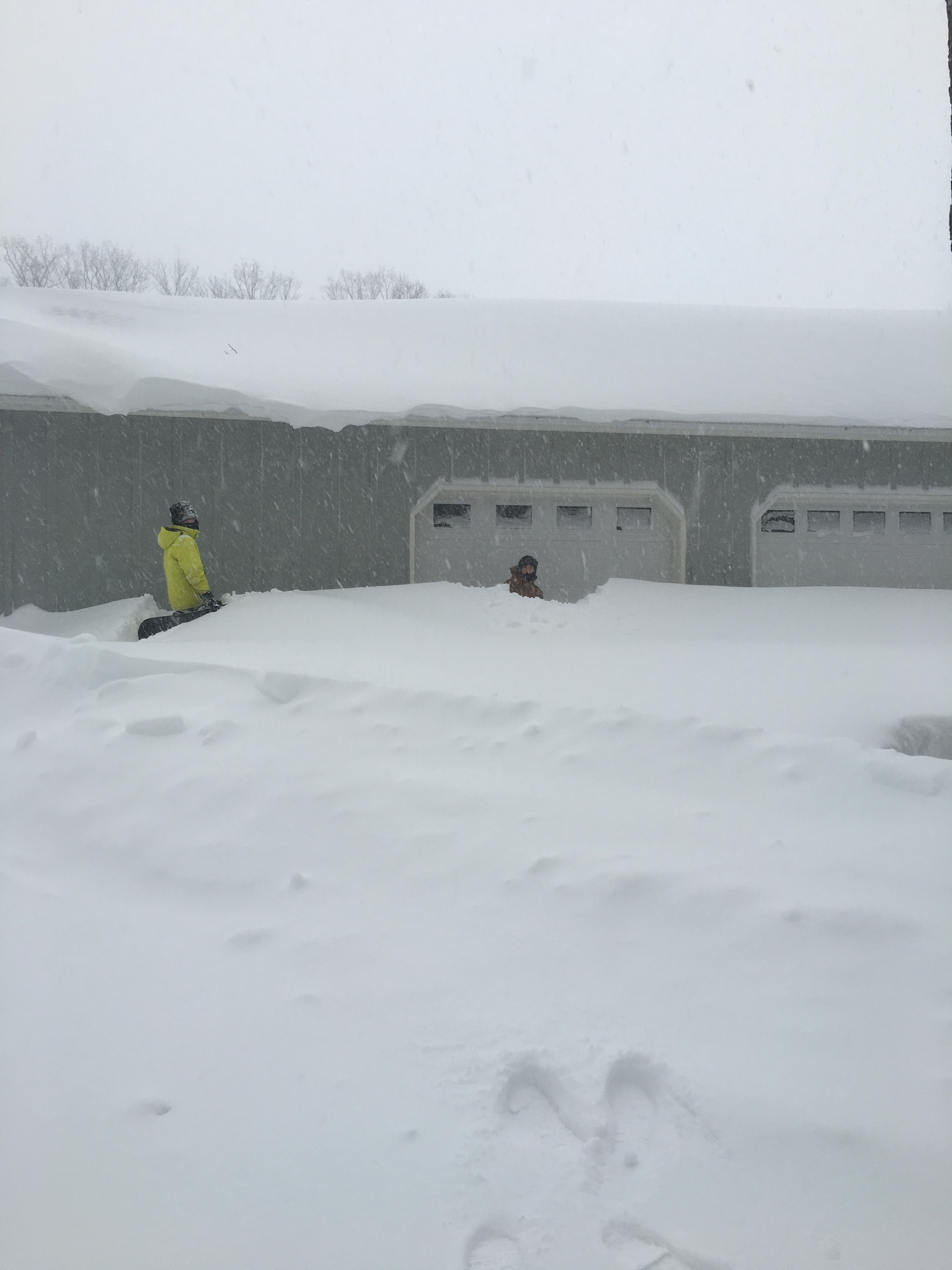
Five-foot snow drifts in Reading, Pennsylvania

The Pennsylvania Department of Transportation had 2,200 vehicles and more than 733,000 tons of road salt on standby for use. Trucks deployed brine across major roads in and around Philadelphia, though residents were advised to avoid travel unless necessary. A travel ban was declared for Lancaster, Lebanon, Newberry Township, and York on January 23. SEPTA issued a near complete shutdown of its services, shutting down all bus services and closing all rail except for the Broad Street Line and Market–Frankford Line subways.

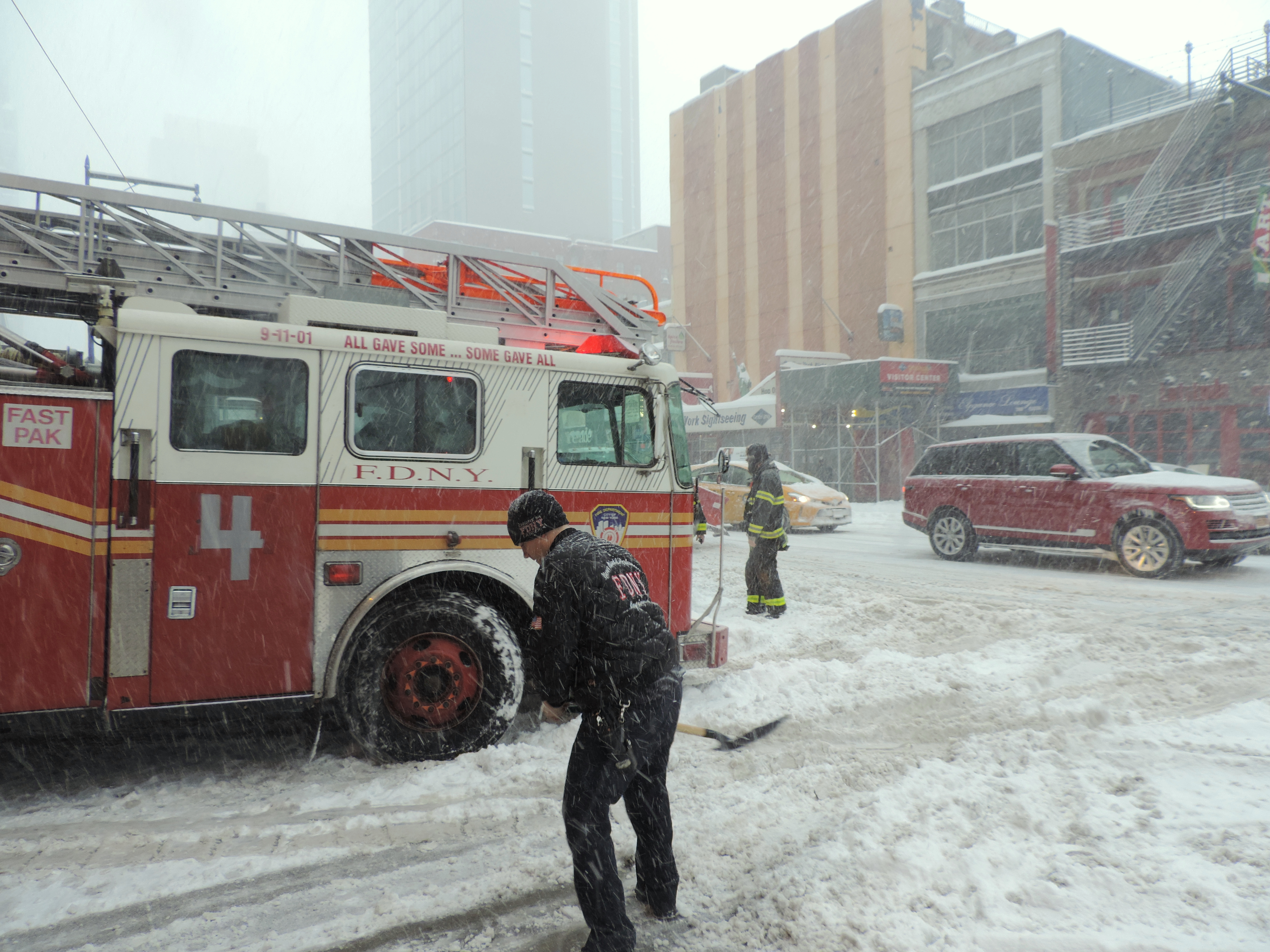
Emergency services in New York City, including the New York City Fire Department functioned during the snowstorm

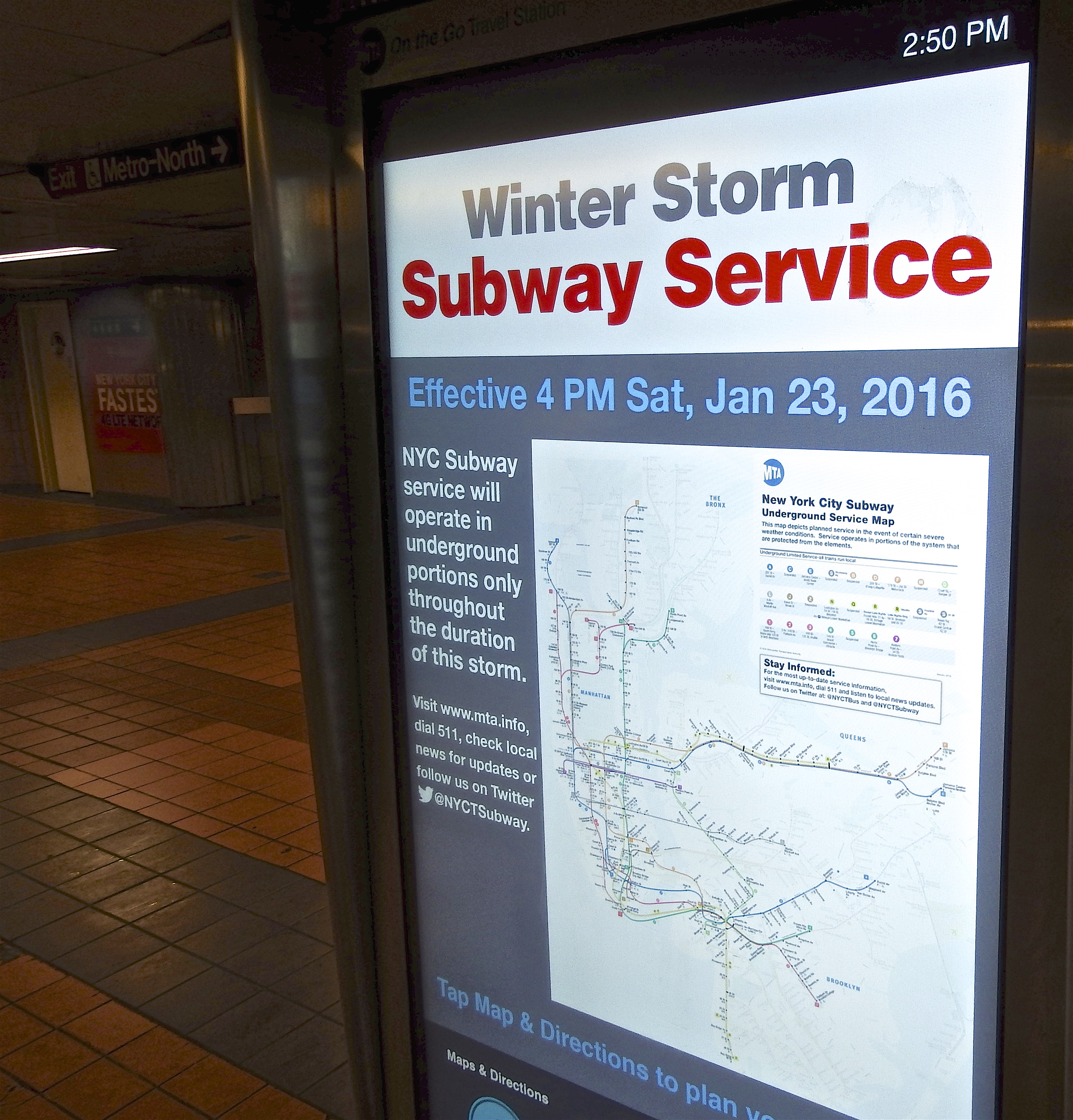
A service advisory in an unusually empty Grand Central–42nd Street station warning that suspension of elevated subway service was imminent

New York City mayor Bill de Blasio declared a hazardous travel advisory for the city, encouraging people not to travel; however, he did not ban traveling. On January 22, he declared a "winter weather emergency" and told residents to "Get done what you have to get done today ... Do not bring your vehicle out tomorrow". Taking place a year after a storm prompted the closure of the city's subway system in January 2015, only to largely bypass the city, Governor Andrew Cuomo stated that services would remain running. Approximately 1,800 workers equipped with 800 heaters were to keep rails clear for use. Thousands of sanitation workers, 1,700 plows, and 150,000 tons of road salt were on standby to clear city roads. He also put 600 members of the New York National Guard on standby. More than 50 power workers from Vermont were dispatched to Long Island to help restore power outages. Around noon on January 23, owing to a significant increase in expected snowfall, Cuomo issued a travel ban for all roads in New York City and Long Island. The New York City Transit Authority suspended bus service; rail service on the Long Island Rail Road, Metro-North, and Staten Island Railway; and elevated subway service (with underground subway lines remaining open until further notice). In the meantime, the Port Authority of New York and New Jersey closed bridges and tunnels in the region. The New Jersey Transit was also shut down in preparation of the blizzard.

A travel ban was instituted for Newark, New Jersey, on January 23 through the afternoon of January 24 in light of hundreds of snow-related accidents.

Strong winds coupled with prolonged onshore flow resulted in a major coastal flood threat for Delaware and New Jersey. Near-shore waves were forecast to reach 15 to 20 ft (4.6 to 6.1 m) with a storm surge of 3 to 5 ft (0.91 to 1.52 m). In New Jersey, a mandatory evacuation was ordered for residents in coastal Barnegat Township in anticipation of significant coastal flooding; several other towns were placed under voluntary evacuation orders.

Delaware Governor Jack Markell declared a "level 1 driving warning", encouraging people not to travel and indicating drivers should be extra cautious. The Delaware Department of Transportation had 330 snow plows ready to clear roads, though many areas were expected to be impassible on January 23. Shelters were also opened for the homeless. In New Castle County and Kent County in Delaware the Department of Transportation and Governor Jack Markell declared a Level 2 driving restriction (essential personnel on the roads only.)

=== Southeast ===
Anticipating a damaging ice storm, approximately 4,500 linemen were placed on standby to repair downed power lines in North Carolina; 1,000 state transportation workers also prepared for heavy snowfall, with crews placed on 12-hour shifts to be deployed as needed. Crews from across the country arrived to assist North Carolina power companies. Two million gallons of brine were used to pre-treat roads statewide. Across Tennessee, state offices closed for January 22, warming centers opened, and the Red Cross placed shelters on standby. The Tennessee Highway Patrol asked for people to remain off the roads, saying, "We are desperately asking you please DON'T DRIVE".

=== British Isles ===
The storm was forecast to cross the Atlantic Ocean and affect the British Isles from January 26 to 28. The storm was expected to be less severe, with rain rather than snow; however, the possibility of strong winds and localized flooding was noted. Particular concern was raised over areas that suffered from significant flooding during the preceding months. Wind gusts as high as 70 mph (110 km/h) were forecast for the Hebrides and 50 to 60 mph (80 to 97 km/h) for coastal Scotland. The storm in the British Isles was far less severe than in the United States and Storm Gertrude a few days later may have been worse.

== Impact ==
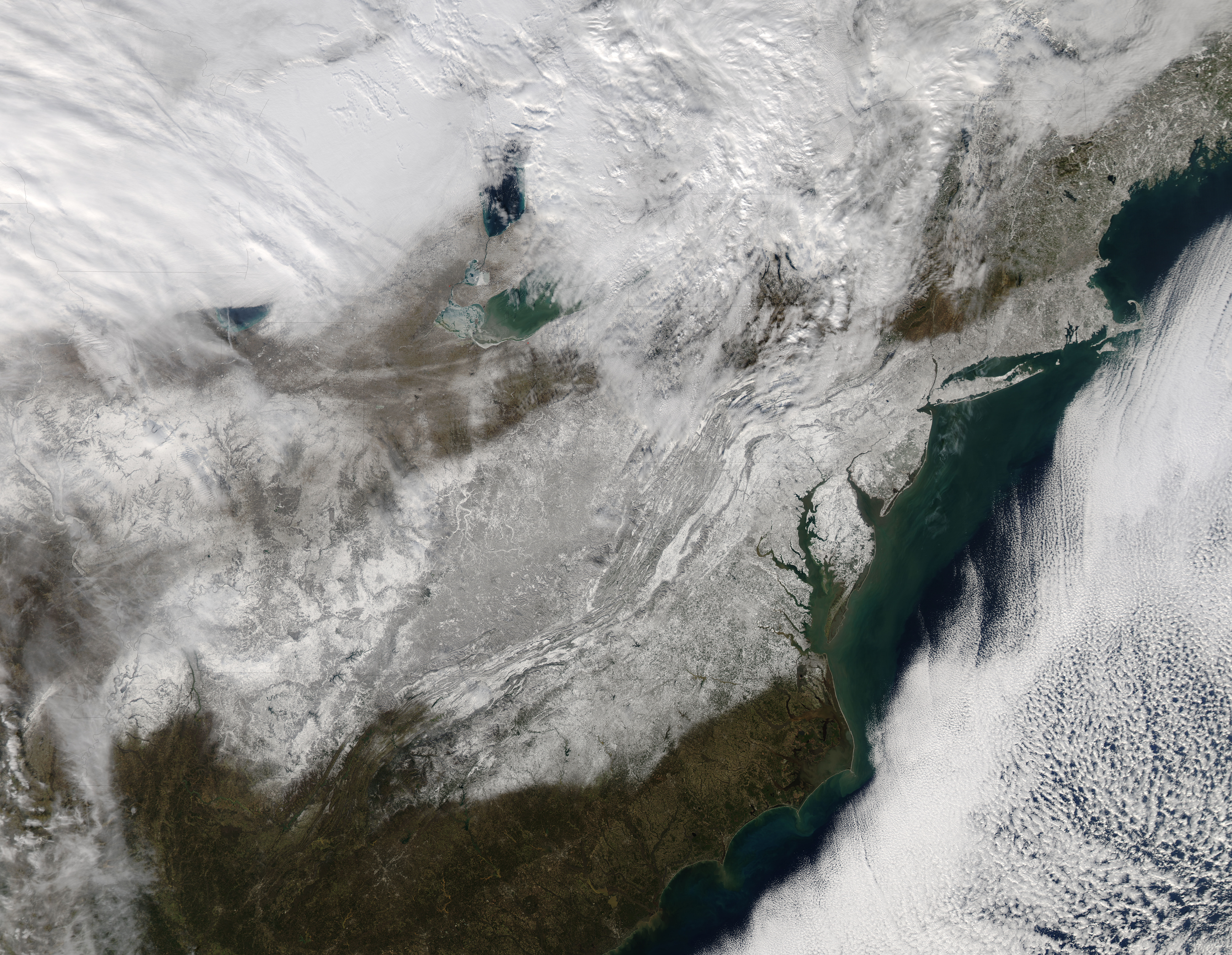
View of the eastern United States at 1:30 p.m. EST (18:30 UTC) on January 24 after the blizzard subsided. Snow blankets the region, highlighting local topographic and hydrologic features.

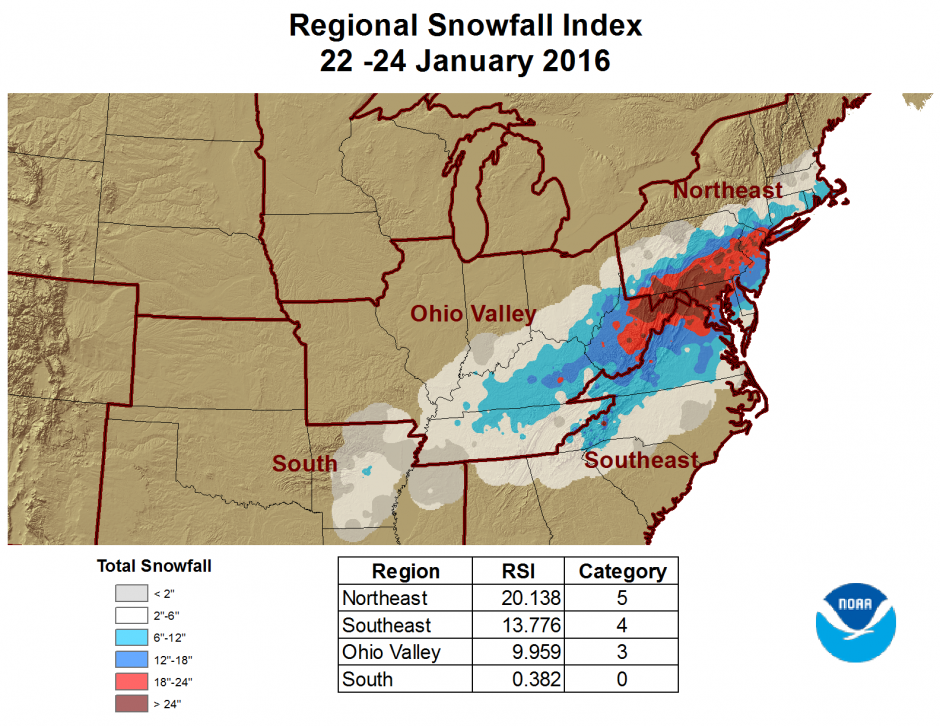
Regional Snowfall Index analysis of the storm

The storm's widespread effects paralyzed travel across the eastern United States as it produced more than 20 in (51 cm) of snow across a large area along the Appalachian Mountains. At least 55 fatalities have been attributed to the storm and its aftermath: 12 in Virginia, 9 in Pennsylvania, 6 in New Jersey, 6 in New York, 6 in North Carolina, 4 in South Carolina, 3 in Maryland, 3 in Washington, D.C., 1 in Arkansas, 1 in Delaware, 1 in Georgia, 1 in Kentucky, 1 in Massachusetts, and 1 in Ohio. Throughout the affected region, more than 631,000 people lost power: 270,000 in New Jersey, 147,000 in North Carolina, 66,000 in Georgia, 55,000 in Virginia, 47,000 collectively in Delaware and Maryland, and nearly 30,000 in South Carolina.

Economic losses—from lost sales revenue and wages—are estimated between $500 million and $3 billion. Moody's Analytics indicated the highest losses, stating $2.5–3 billion; however, the storm's occurrence on a weekend accounted for less losses than what would otherwise be expected. Planalytics placed losses at $850 million and IHS Global Insight estimated losses between $500 million and $1 billion. Although an estimate was not provided, AON Benfield placed losses in the billions of dollars, noting similarities to the Blizzard of 1996 which inflicted $4.6 billion in economic losses. Despite the expected major losses, the rush to buy supplies ahead of the storm's arrival may mitigate the overall impact. The airline industry suffered approximately $200 million in lost revenue.

Using the Regional Snowfall Index, the storm ranked as a Category 5, "extreme", storm for the Northeast and a Category 4, "crippling", for the Southeast. It was also ranked as a Category 3, "major", event in the Ohio Valley. Approximately 103 million people were in the storm's path, including 33 million in the expected blizzard area. About 21 million people in the Northeast experienced more than 20 in (51 cm) of snow. Half of the affected people were in the Northeast (which includes the Northeast megalopolis); the storm's RSI reached 20.138 in this region, the fourth-highest on record for the region. The primary factor driving its high classification was the affected population. The storm's RSI of 13.776 in the Southeast was the twelfth-highest on record.

=== Severe weather on the Gulf Coast ===
During January 21 through the early hours of January 22, severe thunderstorms brought damaging winds and hail to portions of Louisiana, Mississippi, Alabama, and Florida. Five tornadoes touched down across Mississippi: an EF0 near Crystal Springs, an EF0 near Homewood, an EF1 near Loyd Star, an EF1 near Pinola, and an EF2 near Sumrall. Numerous trees and power lines were downed, multiple structures were damaged, and a few were destroyed by the tornadoes. Straight line winds near Improve, Lamar County, Mississippi, significantly damaged 10–12 homes. Hail reached 2.75 in (7.0 cm) in diameter in Wilmer, Louisiana. The most significant damage occurred overnight across the Florida Panhandle and neighboring Alabama. Winds gusting to 73 mph (117 km/h) downed numerous trees and power lines and damaged structures.

=== Southeastern states ===
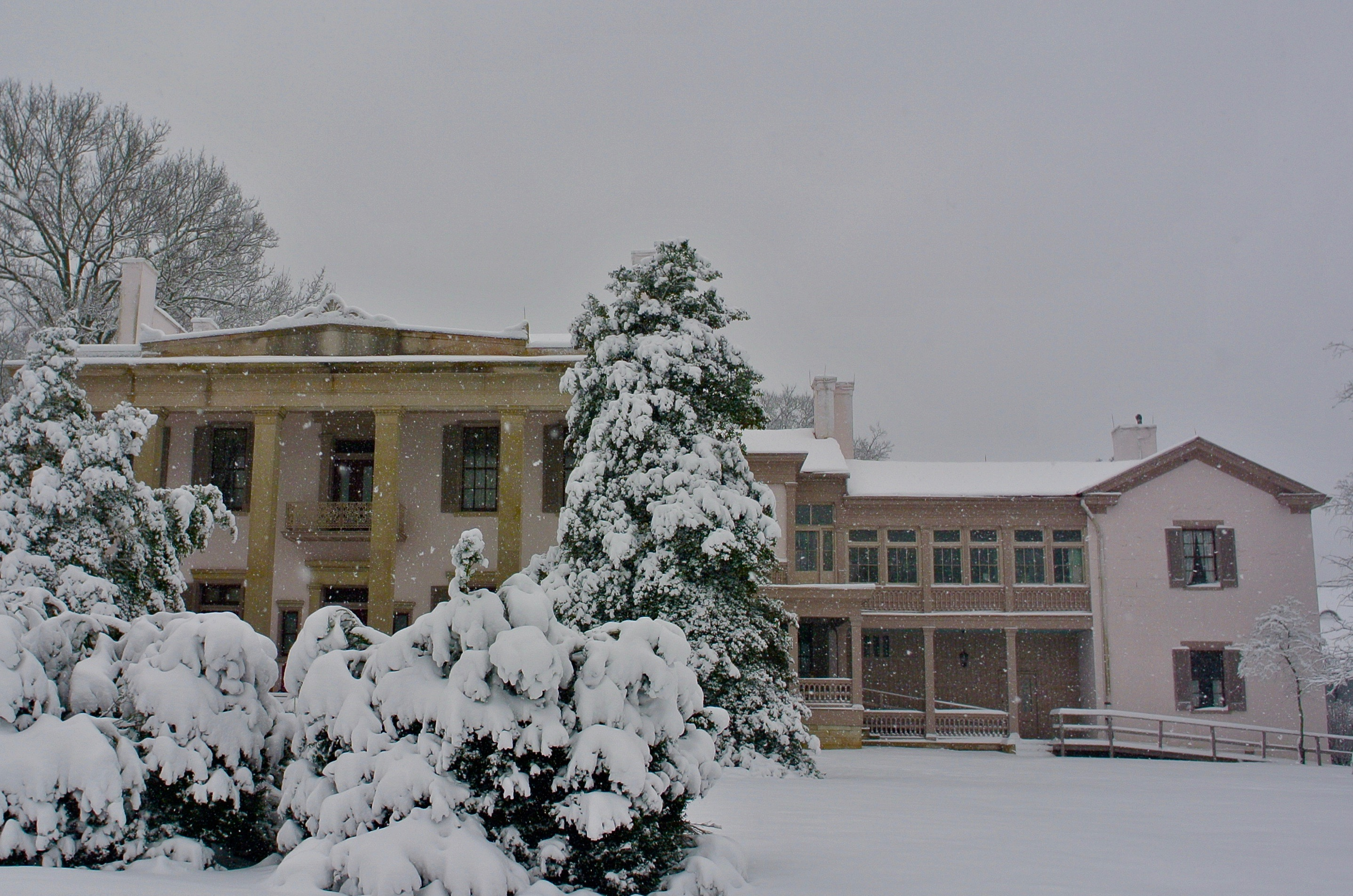
Snowfall at the Belle Meade Plantation in Tennessee on January 22

Snow fell across a large portion of Arkansas on January 21–22, with a daily record of 7.2 in (18 cm) observed just outside Little Rock. Snowfall was confined to the eastern half of the state, with freezing rain amounting to 0.25 in (6.4 mm) observed in northeastern counties. Strong winds in excess of 35 mph (56 km/h)—with a gust of 47 mph (76 km/h) measured in Jonesboro—left more than 16,000 people in the state without power. One fatality near Hoxie was due to slippery roads.

Early on January 22, heavy snow fell across parts of western Tennessee. Roads around Nashville quickly became impassable, including portions of Interstates 40 and 24, and local police reported more than 200 accidents. In Lexington, Kentucky, one accident led to injury; 17 other accidents were reported. Multiple accidents in Rockcastle County prompted the closure of 12 mi (19 km) of I-75 in Kentucky. Along a 35-mile (56 km) stretch of Interstate 75 in Kentucky, hundreds of drivers became stranded for more than 16 hours on January 22–23. In a separate incident, an 11-mile (18 km) stretch of Interstate 77 in West Virginia was blocked by stuck tractor-trailers that were lying across the highway. The National Guard was deployed to provide people with food, water, and fuel. A transportation worker died when his truck skidded off icy roads.

Treacherous road conditions in North Carolina resulted in at least 571 accidents and 800 "service calls" from police. Five deaths were reported across the state. One person died in a collision on Interstate 95. Numerous roads were shut down accordingly. One person was killed and three others were injured in Forsyth County. An accident along Interstate 77 near Troutman resulted in the death of a 4-year-old boy. Freezing rain resulted in widespread power outages, bringing down numerous trees and power lines in the state. Many roads closed because of debris, including portions of Interstate 40 in Johnston County. Approximately 147,000 people lost power in North Carolina, with Wake County accounting for 50,000 of the total.

Four people died in South Carolina: two from carbon monoxide poisoning in Greenville, one in a car accident on an icy road in Greenville County, and another from an accident in Jonesville. Nearly 30,000 people lost power in the state. Portions of Interstates 26 and 95 were temporarily shut down for icy conditions. Flurries were observed as far south as the coastal regions of the state, including the ACE Basin as well as Charleston.

Upwards of 8 in (20 cm) of snow fell across Georgia, with the highest totals confined to northern parts of the state. High winds downed trees and power lines, leaving approximately 66,000 people without power across the state. A postal worker was killed when strong winds blew a large branch off a tree, crushing him in his car. Snow fell as far south as Mobile, Alabama, with additional flurries extending into Jacksonville and Gainesville along the Florida Panhandle late on January 22. Temperatures in Gainesville fell to 28 °F (−2 °C). Further south in Florida, record rain of 4.79 in (122 mm) fell in West Palm Beach.

=== Mid-Atlantic states ===
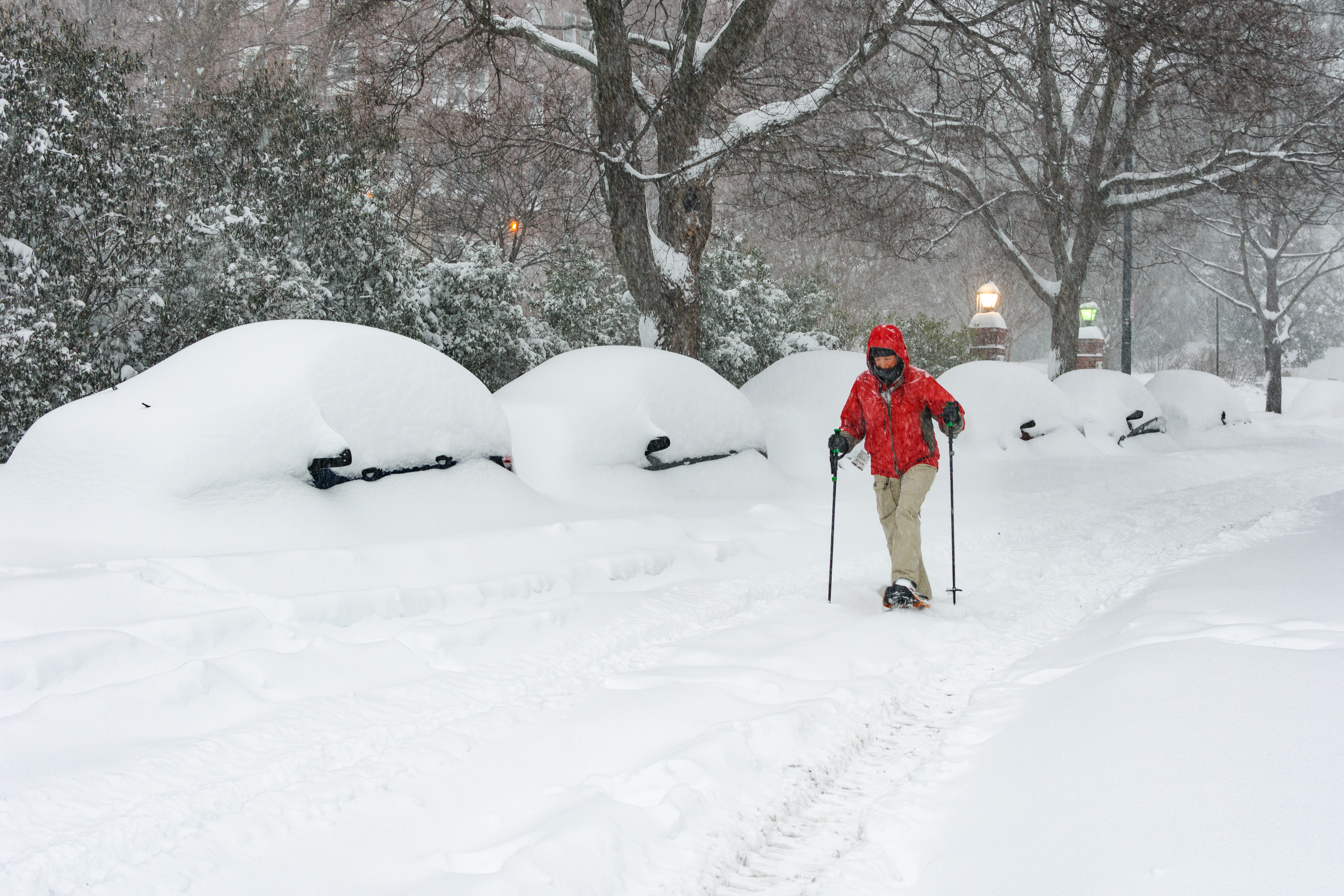
Aftermath of the storm in Cleveland Park, Washington, D.C.

Maximum snow depth was measured at 42 in (110 cm) in Glengary, West Virginia, on January 24. Baltimore, Maryland, recorded its largest snowfall on record. Two people died from heart attacks while shoveling snow and a third from undetermined causes across Maryland. A large portion of the Ocean City fishing pier was destroyed by rough seas and high winds. West Virginia's emergency management reported Interstate 77 to be "completely shut down" following an accident involving semi-trailers. The National Guard was called in to assist clearing the stranded vehicles. Six people died from snow-related incidents in Virginia. Virginia State Police responded to 989 accidents and 793 disabled vehicles through the evening of January 22. A total of 12 people died in storm-related incidents across Virginia. One person died when their car skid off a road in Chesapeake and collided with a tree. Five people died from hypothermia: one each in Charles City, Gloucester County, Hampton, Henry County, and Wise County. A combination of snow and ice accumulation caused the roof of Donk's Theatre in Hudgins, Virginia, to collapse; the structure was deemed a total loss and will be demolished. The roof of a 4,700 ft^{2} (437 m^{2}) building collapsed in Charlottesville. Seven people required hospitalization for carbon monoxide poisoning at an apartment complex in Herndon when vents became clogged with snow. The snow completely destroyed two parking lots at Chincoteague National Wildlife Refuge. Three people died while shoveling snow in Washington, D.C.

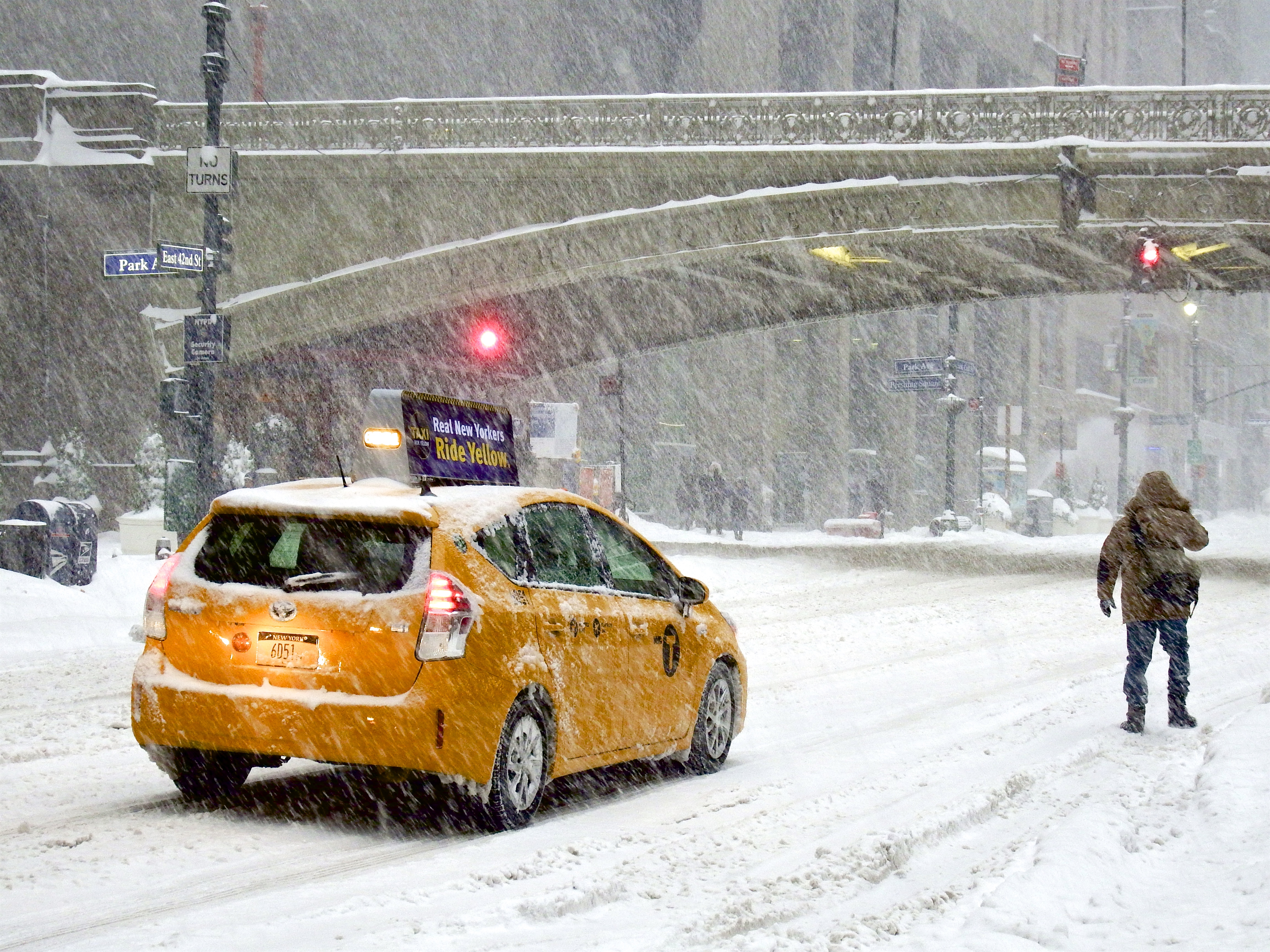
Intense snowfall at Pershing Square, Manhattan, New York.

Snow-related incidents resulted in nine deaths across Pennsylvania. In Harrisburg, snowfall from the storm was reported as 30.2 in (77 cm), breaking the city's previous record snowfall of 25 in (64 cm) which was set in February 1983. Near Bedford, approximately 500 vehicles became stuck along a westbound stretch of the Pennsylvania Turnpike for over 24 hours from January 22–23 near the eastern approach to the Allegheny Mountain Tunnel. Among the stranded vehicles were one bus carrying the Duquesne University men's basketball team and another carrying Temple University's women's gymnastics team. Despite the scale of the incident, no major injuries were reported. The band Guster, stranded in Pittsburgh by the blocking of the turnpike, held an impromptu concert in an alley. Four people died while shoveling snow: two in both Lancaster and Montgomery counties. One of the dead in Montgomery County was a woman who was 8-months pregnant; the baby was declared dead on-scene when paramedics arrived. Another man died from carbon monoxide poisoning in his car in Reading after a passing snow plow buried his car in snow.

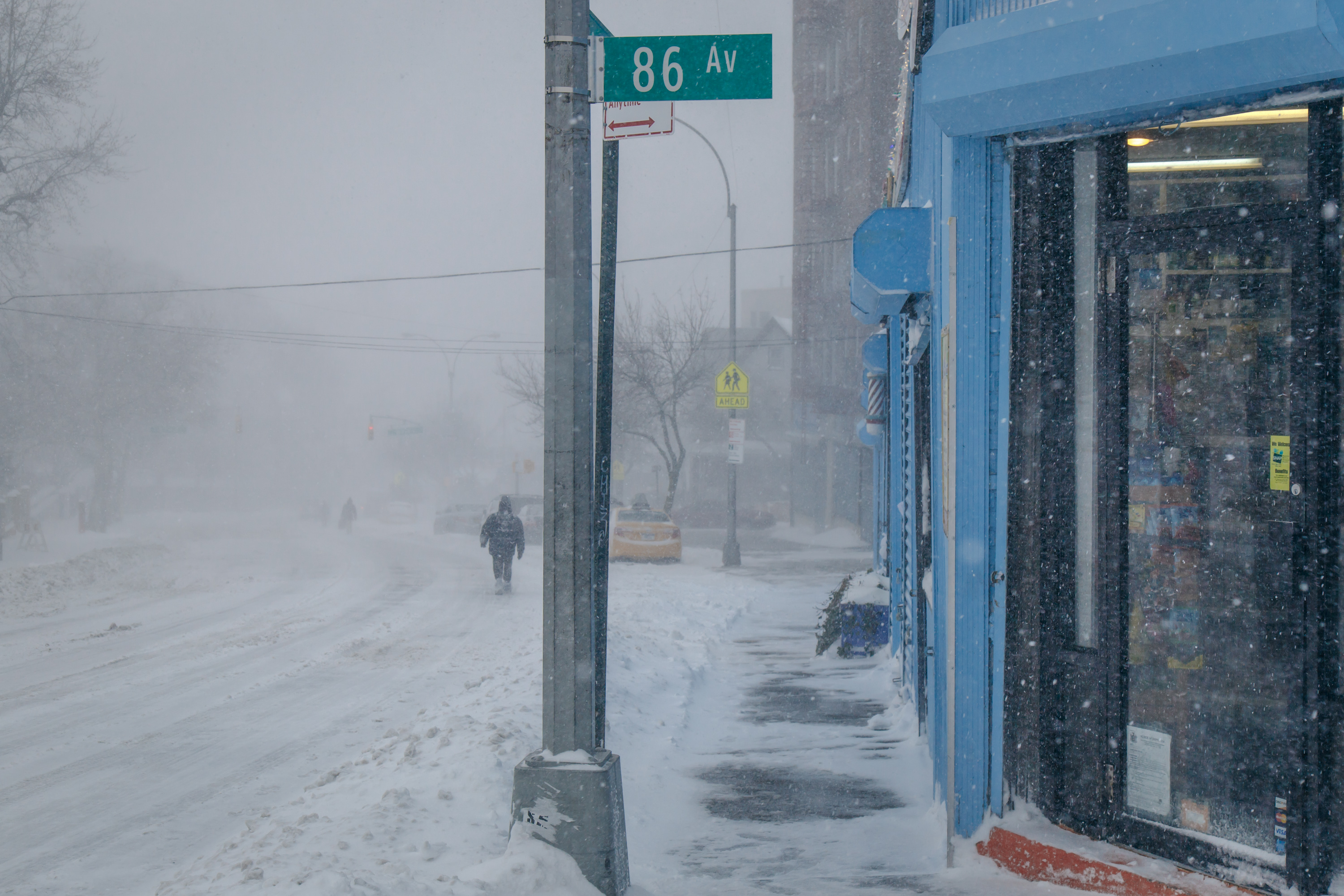
Near-whiteout conditions in Briarwood, Queens, New York City, during the storm

One person died in Magnolia, Delaware, after suffering a heart attack while shoveling. A power outage at the Delaware City Refinery, thought to be related to the storm, forced the facility to shut down after chemicals were released. A mother and her 1-year-old son died from carbon monoxide poisoning in Passaic, New Jersey, after snowfall blocked their vehicle's tailpipe; a 3-year-old girl was hospitalized, but later died on January 27. Three other people died while attempting to walk home during the blizzard: one each in East Greenwich Township, Hackensack, and Mahwah.

Snowfall across New York City and Long Island was more intense than initially forecast, falling at rates of 3 in (7.6 cm) per hour at times. Before the travel ban was implemented, buses struggled to make their routes and long delays were common. At Central Park, a storm-total accumulation of 27.5 in (69.8 cm) was observed, the highest total on record for the city since observations began in 1869. This surpassed the previous record of 26.9 in (68.3 cm) measured during the February 2006 blizzard. The snowstorm made January 2016 the 2nd snowiest January in New York City history, while tying it with February 1934 for the 6th snowiest month. Accumulations reached an all-time record high of 30.5 in (77 cm) at John F. Kennedy International Airport. Police across New York City responded to more than 200 accidents and 300 disabled vehicles. Emergency personnel responded to about 3,000 9-1-1 calls across the city. Five people died while shoveling snow: two in Queens, two in unknown parts of the city, and one in Staten Island. At least two deaths in Long Island were from shoveling snow. One person was killed by a snow plow in Oyster Bay Cove on Long Island.

==== Coastal flooding ====
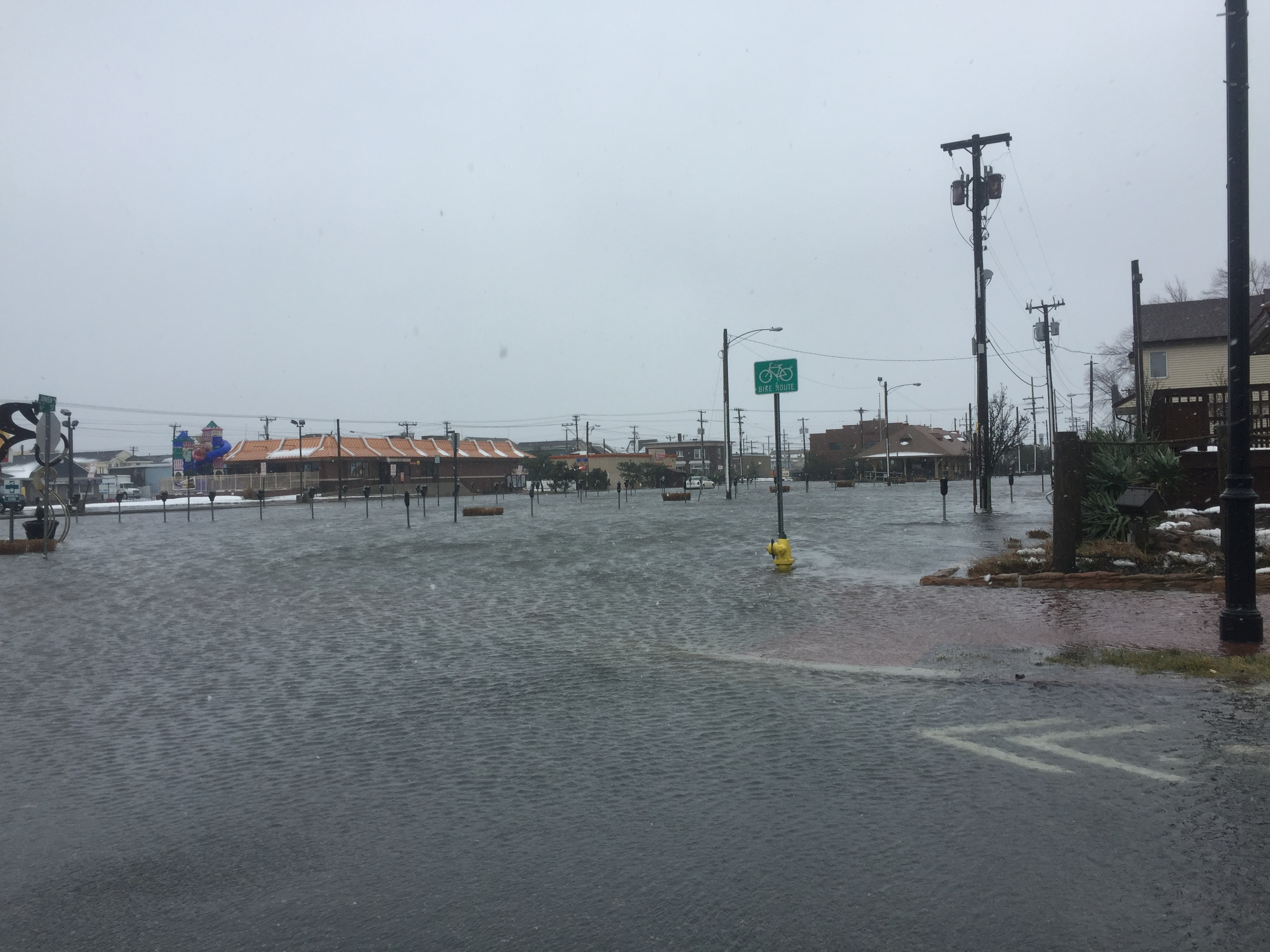
Street flooding in Ocean City, New Jersey, on January 23

Significant coastal flooding took place in Delaware and New Jersey. The first, and most severe, round of flooding took place during the morning of January 23. A second round took place after the storm's passage on the morning of January 24, concurrent with high tide. Record tides occurred in Lewes, Delaware. Approximately 20 mi (32 km) of dunes along Delaware's 24 mi (39 km) oceanfront coast sustained significant damage, with many areas flattened. Forty people required evacuation in Long Neck and Oak Orchard. Delaware Route 1 was shut down between Bethany Beach and Dewey Beach for flooding.

Tides at Cape May, New Jersey, reached a record 9.26 ft (2.82 m), surpassing the previous highest of 8.67 ft (2.64 m) set during Hurricane Sandy in 2012. Fifty people required evacuation in Atlantic City, and at least 150 homes were flooded. Strong winds accompanying the flooding caused damage to many homes. Streets in Ocean City and Stone Harbor were inundated with several feet of water; according to a resident in Stone Harbor, water reached 5 ft (1.5 m) in depth on some streets. Effects were most severe along the Delaware Bay. Combined with snowfall and freezing temperatures, the flooded roads became a mix of ice and slush. Long Beach Island, still recovering from the effects of Hurricane Sandy, sustained severe beach erosion. The storm's tide and waves carved 15 ft (4.6 m) cliffs along coastal beaches. A recently constructed dune in Belmar held back most of the water, with one minor breach along its 1.3 mi (2.1 km) expanse.

=== New England ===
Southern New England experienced significant snow accumulations from Jan 23 to Jan 24. Around a foot of snow fell across Southern Connecticut, Rhode Island, and Southeastern Massachusetts. Blizzard conditions affected southeastern Massachusetts for several hours, with Nantucket and Martha's Vineyard reporting such conditions for four hours. Blizzard conditions were reported in Bridgeport for 4 hours lasting from 8 am to 12 pm. Snow totals reached 16.0 in (40.6 cm) in Norwalk, Connecticut and 13.0 in (33.0 cm) on Block Island, Rhode Island. Wind gusts on Block Island reached 75 mph (121 km/h) while gusts in New Haven reached 52 mph (83 km/h). One person died after being struck by a snow plow.

=== Newfoundland and Nova Scotia ===
After leaving the Eastern United States, the storm complex brought light snowfall to coastal areas of Nova Scotia, Canada, on January 24. Environment Canada indicated accumulations up to 5 cm (2.0 in) alongside wind gusts of 30 to 70 km/h (19 to 43 mph). Residents, however, reported up to 30 cm (12 in) of snow in Shelburne County. Street parking was banned in Halifax on select streets to enable easier clearing of roads. On January 25, a Boeing 767 traveling from Miami, Florida, to Milan, Italy, encountered severe turbulence produced by the storm about 480 km (300 mi) off Newfoundland. Of the 203 people on board, including crew, seven were injured. The aircraft made an emergency landing at St. John's International Airport.

== Aftermath ==
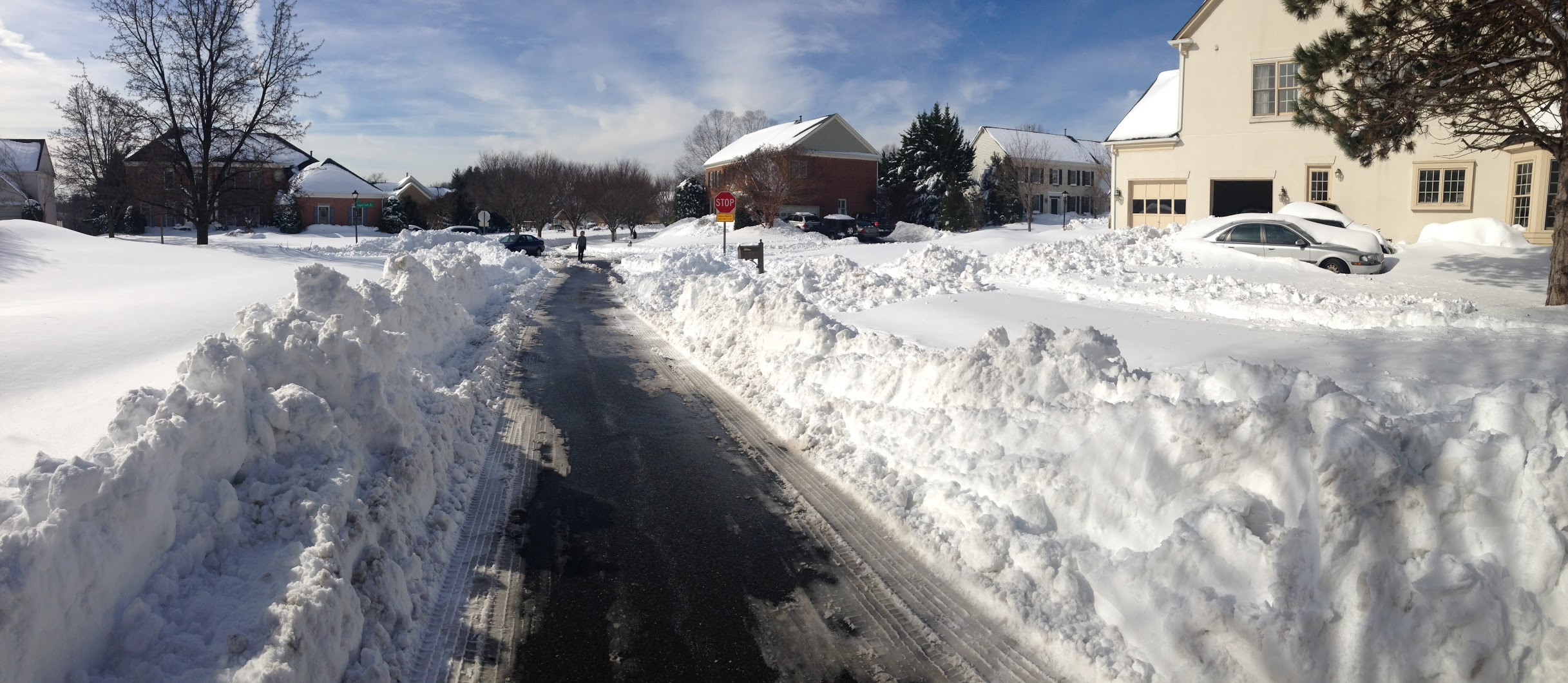
Snow depth in Montgomery County, Maryland

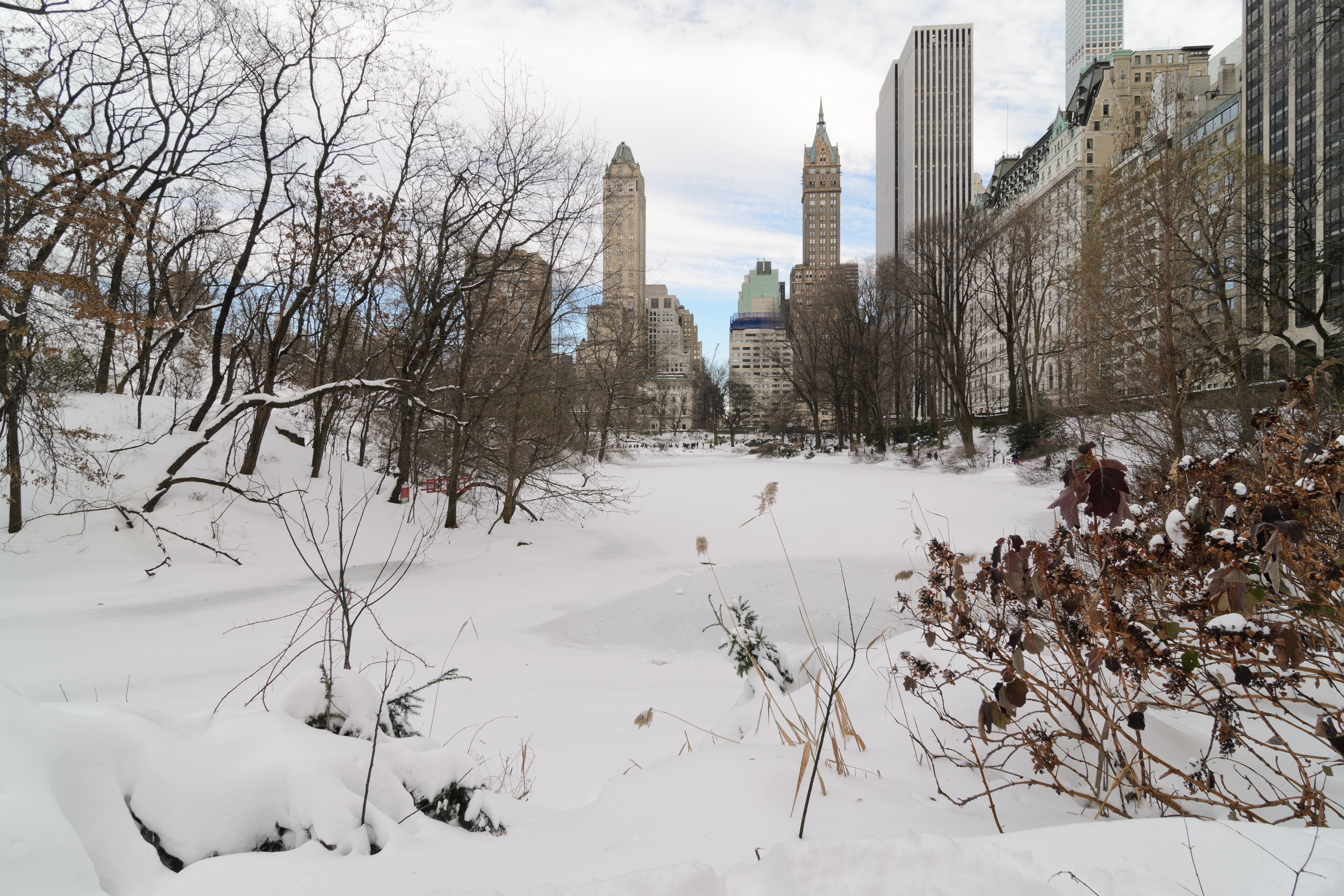
Partially frozen-over pond in Central Park, New York City

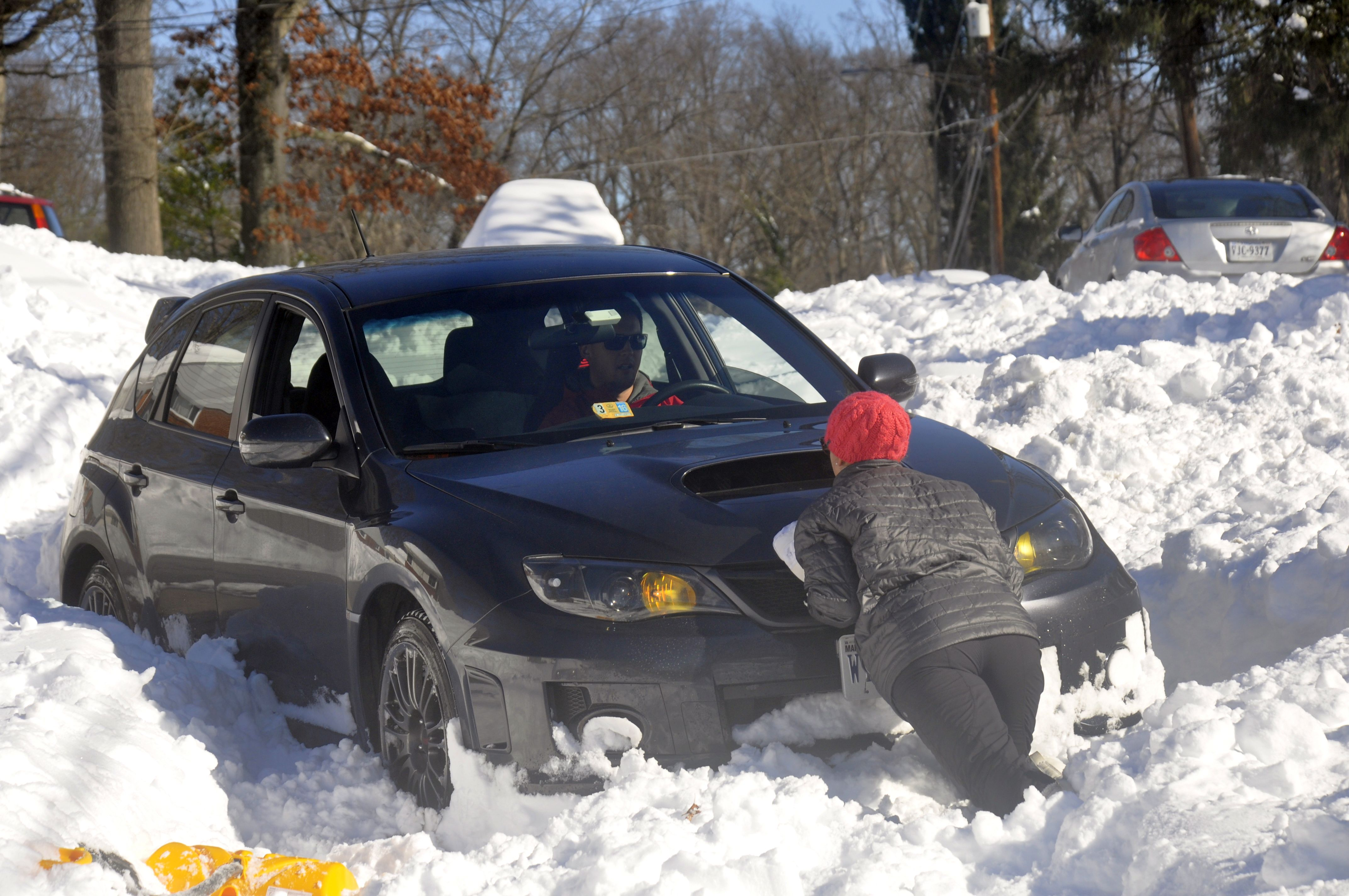
Car stuck in snow on an unplowed road in Northern Virginia on January 24

Many cities struggled to cope with the snowfall, including Washington, D.C., where schools and government offices remained closed through January 26, three days after the storm. Schools in Baltimore, Maryland, and Philadelphia, Pennsylvania, also remained closed through January 26. Side streets around the D.C. area were unplowed through January 26. Through January 27, Washington, D.C. police issued $1,078,000 worth of parking tickets and $65,600 in fines for vehicles parked or abandoned on snow emergency routes. At least 656 vehicles were towed.

The New York Post described Queens, New York, as "basically forgotten" on January 25 as roads remained covered with snow. Many residents complained that snowplows did not come through their area until at least a day after the storm passed. Crews expressed that certain areas, such as in the Bronx, were difficult to navigate with snow plows and there was no place to put the snow. A resident of Pelham Bay stated that 3-1-1 operators were not picking up calls. Mayor De Blasio toured areas of Staten Island on January 24 and urged people to be patient. In contrast, both Governor Cuomo and Mayor De Blasio were praised for their handling of the storm prior to its arrival, and for being the first to issue a travel ban, which is credited for potentially saving lives.

New Jersey Governor Chris Christie, who flew back to the state from New Hampshire during his presidential campaign, left to resume campaigning shortly after the storm passed. He was criticized for his quick departure and heated responses to questions about why he left the state. He stated that while there was some locally significant flood damage in Southern New Jersey, the overall effects across the state did not warrant his presence. He responded to one person by saying, "I don't know what you expect me to do. You want me to go down there with a mop?" A Stockton University graduate started up a fund to provide 1,000 mops to Christie in response to his comment. On January 26, Christie apologized to North Wildwood Mayor Patrick Rosenello for calling him "crazy" during his response to criticism the day prior. Christie also requested that Rosenello apologize on his behalf to first responders, residents, and business owners.

In March, President Barack Obama declared Delaware, Maryland, New Jersey, Pennsylvania, Virginia, and Washington, D.C., major disaster areas. The federal funding would only cover costs incurred by public infrastructure, debris removal, and emergency measures to ensure public safety. Preliminary estimates places the total cost of assistance at $168,334,023, (Note: An estimate of federal assistance for Pennsylvania is not available.) with New Jersey accounting for $82,663,604.

=== Snowfall measurement reviews ===
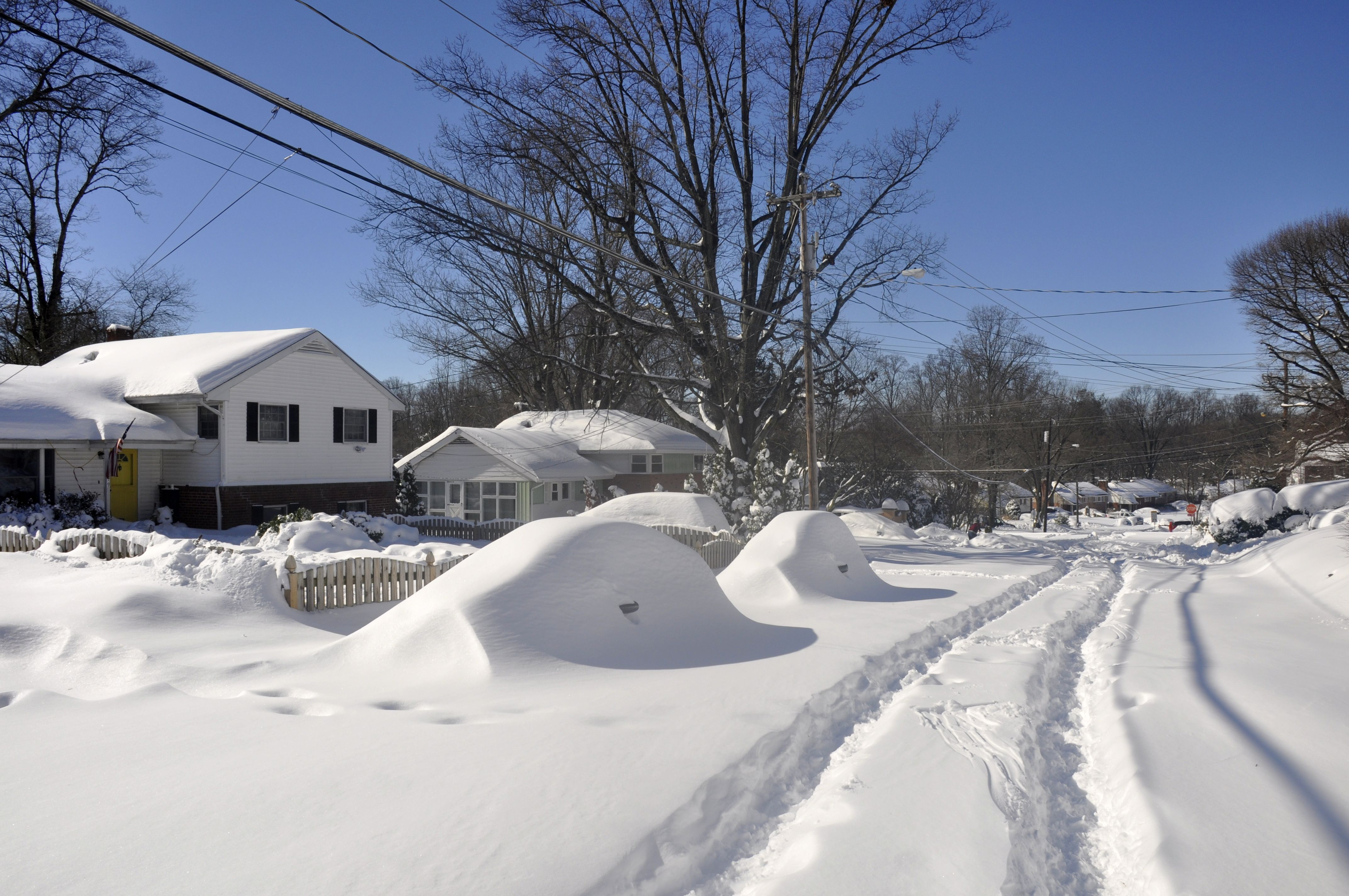
The aftermath of the blizzard in the Fairfax Villa neighborhood in Fairfax, Virginia. Unplowed streets and buried cars can be seen here.

Following the storm, the National Weather Service conducted a review of eight snowfall observations following concerns over their quality. Measurements from Ronald Reagan Washington National Airport, Dulles International Airport, Baltimore/Washington International Airport, John F. Kennedy International Airport, LaGuardia Airport, and Philadelphia International Airport were verified as reliable. The total at Ronald Reagan Washington National Airport was brought into question immediately following the blizzard as the snow observers lost their measuring board during the storm; however, the assessment determined that proper procedure was continued even after the board was lost and the total was considered accurate. A review of measurements at Central Park, New York, revealed the 26.8 in (68 cm) observation was the result of a communication error and revised the storm-total to 27.5 in (70 cm)—an all-time record for New York City. Furthermore, the 28.1 in (71 cm) measurement at Newark International Airport, New Jersey, was invalidated due to measurements being taken every hour instead of every six hours thus inflating the total. The State Climate Extremes Committee also conducted a review of a potential 24-hour state snowfall record at Mount Mitchell in North Carolina. Their results showed the 24-hour observation of 41 in (100 cm) to be in error, erroneously inflating the snowfall totals. Properly adjusting for liquid snow ratios, the total was revised to 21 in (53 cm). The storm-total accumulation was also revised from 66 in (170 cm) to 33 in (84 cm).

== Snowfall accumulations and records ==
List of highest snowfall accumulations by state during the 2016 blizzard
State	Location	Amount	Ref.
Alabama	Harvest	3.5 in (8.9 cm)	
Arkansas	Cabot, Jacksonville, Sherwood	8.0 in (20 cm)	
Connecticut	Norwalk	16.0 in (41 cm)	
Delaware	Woodside	17.2 in (44 cm)	
Georgia	Germany Valley	8.9 in (23 cm)	
Illinois	Shawneetown	5.5 in (14 cm)	
Indiana	Floyds Knobs	5.0 in (13 cm)	
Kansas	Barnes	10.0 in (25 cm)	
Kentucky	Booneville	22.0 in (56 cm)	
Louisiana	Haynesville	2.5 in (6.4 cm)	
Maryland	North Potomac	38.5 in (98 cm)	
Massachusetts	West Harwich	15.5 in (39 cm)	
Mississippi	Myrtle, Oxford	2.0 in (5.1 cm)	
Missouri	East Prairie	3.0 in (7.6 cm)	
Nebraska	Hebron	9.0 in (23 cm)	
New Jersey	Morris Plains	33.0 in (84 cm)	
New York	Jackson Heights	34.0 in (86 cm)	
North Carolina	Mount Mitchell	33.0 in (84 cm) (Note: Preliminary reports indicated a storm-total snowfall of 66 in (170 cm) for Mount Mitchell, including 41 in (100 cm) in 24-hours. These values were later found to be inaccurate, potentially being inflated by snow drifts and inconsistent measurements, and considered invalid by the State Climate Extremes Committee.)	
Ohio	Graysville	17.0 in (43 cm)	
Pennsylvania	Greencastle	38.3 in (97 cm)	
Rhode Island	Westerly	15.5 in (39 cm)	
South Carolina	Inman	7.5 in (19 cm)	
Tennessee	Jamestown	14.0 in (36 cm)	
Virginia	Gainesboro	38.0 in (97 cm)	
Washington, D.C.	Dalecarlia Reservoir	26.0 in (66 cm)	
West Virginia	Glengary	42.0 in (107 cm)	

List of all-time and daily snowfall records set during the 2016 blizzard
State	Location	Amount	Record type	Ref.
Arkansas	Little Rock	7.2 in (18 cm)	Daily (January 22)	
Connecticut	Bridgeport	9.5 in (24 cm)	Daily (January 23)	
Delaware	Wilmington	13.1 in (33 cm)	Daily (January 23)	
Indiana	Evansville	5.1 in (13 cm)	Daily (January 22)	
Kentucky	Bowling Green	12.2 in (31 cm)	Daily (January 22)	
Kentucky	Jackson	15.7 in (40 cm)	Daily (January 22)	
Kentucky	Paducah	5.9 in (15 cm)	Daily (January 22)	
Maryland	Baltimore–Washington; International Airport	29.2 in (74 cm)	All-time	
New Jersey	Atlantic City	10.1 in (26 cm)	Daily (January 23)	
New York	Central Park	27.5 in (70 cm)	All-time	
New York	Islip	23.4 in (59 cm)	Daily (January 23)	
New York	John F. Kennedy; International Airport	30.5 in (77 cm)	All-time	
New York	LaGuardia Airport	27.9 in (71 cm)	All-time	
North Carolina	Asheville	10.6 in (27 cm)	Daily (January 22)	
North Carolina	Raleigh–Durham International; Airport	1.2 in (3.0 cm)	Daily (January 22)	
Pennsylvania	Allentown	31.9 in (81 cm)	All-time	
Pennsylvania	Harrisburg	30.2 in (77 cm)	All-time	
Pennsylvania	Philadelphia International; Airport	19.4 in (49 cm)	Daily (January 23)	
Tennessee	Nashville	8.0 in (20 cm)	Daily (January 22)	
Virginia	Norfolk	1.2 in (3.0 cm)	Daily (January 23)	
Virginia	Richmond	5.3 in (13 cm)	Daily (January 23)	
Virginia	Ronald Reagan Washington; National Airport	11.3 in (29 cm)	Daily (January 23)	
Virginia	Washington Dulles; International Airport	22.1 in (56 cm)	Daily (January 23)	
Virginia	Wallops Island	1.0 in (2.5 cm)	Daily (January 23)	

== Naming ==
The storm has received several nicknames from various media outlets. The name Winter Storm Jonas was created by The Weather Channel at the beginning of the winter storm season, and assigned to the storm system when it was forecast; it has also been used in international media, and was used by New York City Mayor Bill de Blasio and the United States Postal Service. Reception of the naming of storms has been mixed; The New York Times refers to the name "Jonas" as a marketing ploy while The Weather Channel maintains that it helps others prepare in advance. The Washington Post named the storm Snowzilla, referencing the 2014–16 El Niño event which has been named the "Godzilla El Niño". Connecticut-based WFSB named the system Anna, after former First Lady Anna Harrison. Other sources have dubbed the storm simply Blizzard of 2016 or Blizzard 2016.

== See also ==
- Knickerbocker Storm
- January 1996 United States blizzard – Essentially an analog of the 2016 blizzard, with similar snow totals and areas affected.
- December 2009 North American blizzard
- February 5–6, 2010 North American blizzard
- February 9–10, 2010 North American blizzard
- 2011 Groundhog Day blizzard – Another powerful winter storm that had similar impacts
- February 2016 North American winter storm
- Early January 2017 North American winter storm
- Mid-January 2017 North American ice storm
- February 9–11, 2017 North American blizzard
- February 12–14, 2017 North American blizzard
- January 31–February 3, 2021 nor'easter
