= January 1996 United States blizzard =

Severe blizzard in January 1996

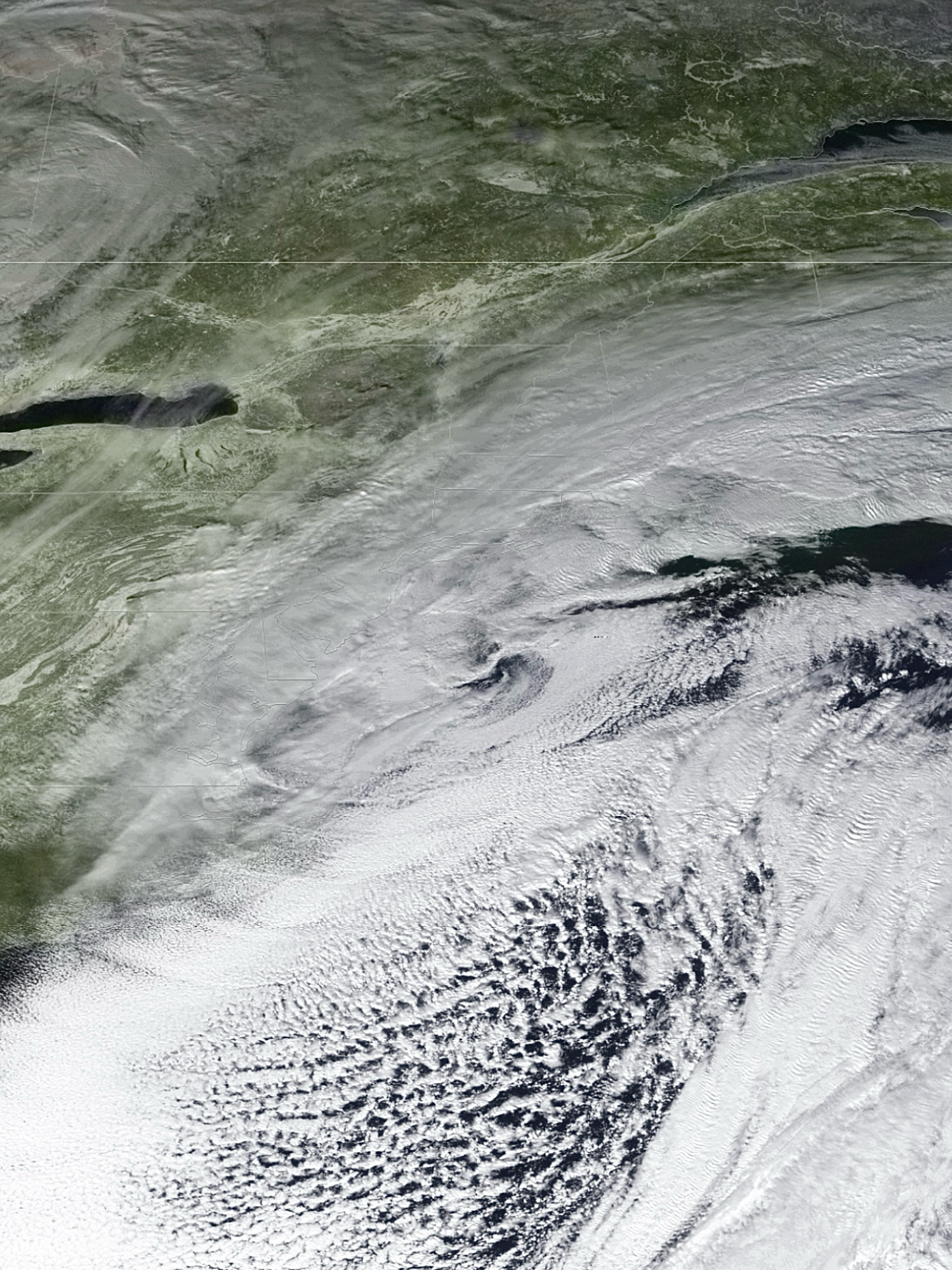
- GOES-8 satellite image of the blizzard near peak intensity near the Northeastern United States on January 8

Meteorological history
- Formed: January 6, 1996
- Dissipated: January 10, 1996

Category 5 "Extreme" blizzard
- Regional snowfall index: 26.37 (NOAA)
- Lowest pressure: 980 mbar (hPa); 28.94 inHg
- Max. snowfall: 48 inches (120 cm) in Pocahontas County, West Virginia

Overall effects
- Fatalities: 154 (+33 due to flooding after the storm)
- Damage: ~US$3 billion
- Areas affected: Continental United States; especially the Northeastern United States
- Part of the 1995–96 North American winter

From January 6–8, 1996, a deadly, historic and crippling blizzard, commonly referred to as the Blizzard of 1996 or simply Blizzard of '96, struck the United States East Coast with up to 4 feet (1.2 m) of wind-driven snow. The City University of New York reported that the storm "dropped 20 inches of snow, had wind gusts of 50 mph and snow drifts up to 8 feet high". This storm was a classic example of a nor'easter, but it would not have been as historically significant without the presence of an Arctic high pressure system located to the north of New York. It was followed by another storm, an Alberta Clipper, on January 12, then unusually warm weather and torrential rain which caused rapid melting and river flooding in the Northeast later that month. Along with the March Superstorm of 1993 and the January 2016 United States blizzard, it is one of only three snowstorms to receive the top rating of 5, or "Extreme", on the Northeast Snowfall Impact Scale (NESIS).

== Impact ==
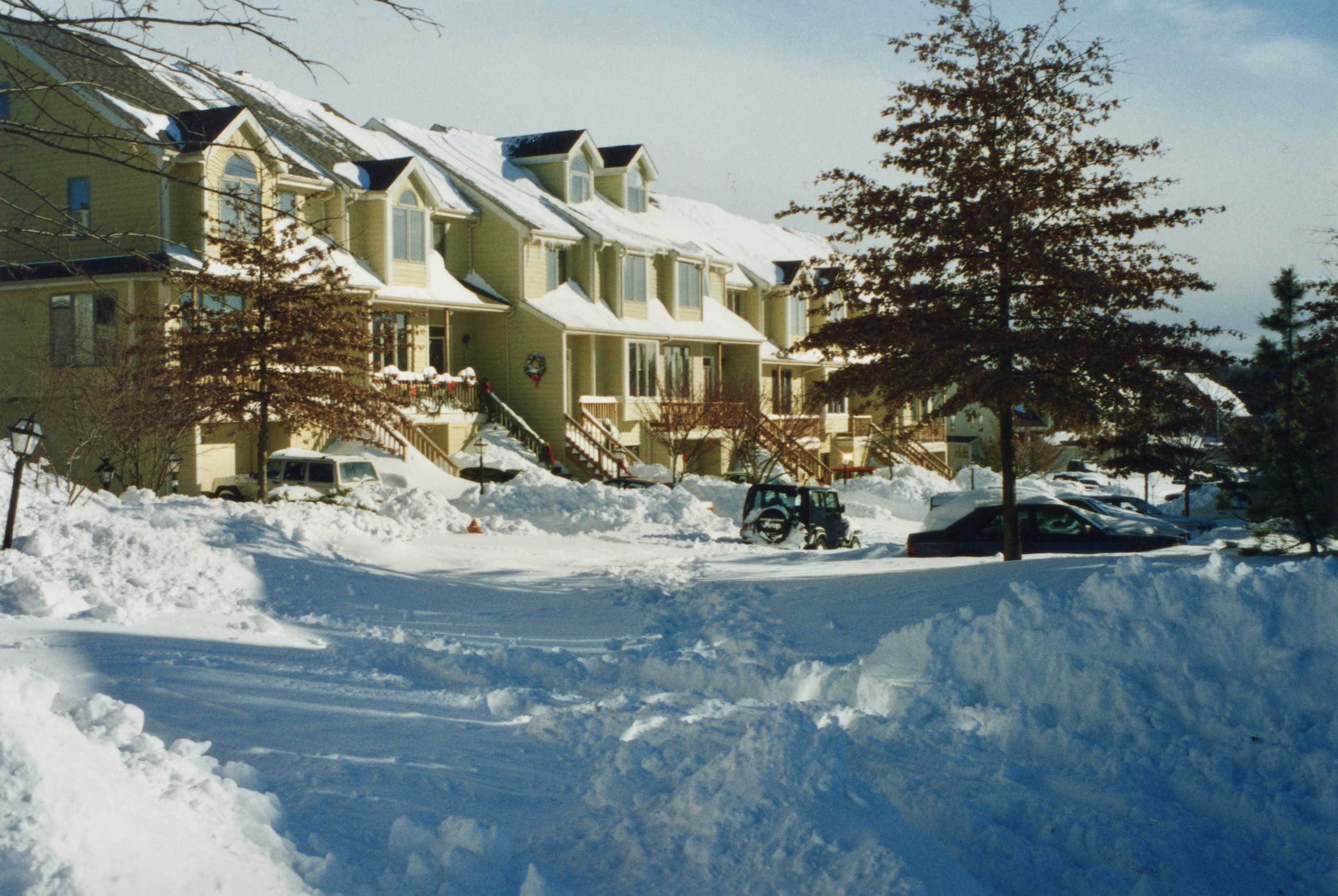
Snowbound jeep, Baltimore, Maryland

=== Virginia ===
Most of Virginia was affected by the more central and western parts receiving one to three feet (30 to 91 cm) of snow. Roanoke got a record-breaking 23 inches (58 cm). The heaviest snow fell in Page County, with around 37 inches (94 cm). Snowfall reached three feet (91 cm) in the Shenandoah Valley and exceeded two feet (61 cm) in much of the Virginia mountain and Piedmont areas. Governor George Allen declared a state of emergency as power lines went down, people were trapped in their houses, and at least eight weather-related deaths occurred. High winds that accompanied the blizzard caused white out conditions and drifts of up to 10 feet (300 cm) in Patrick County.

=== Washington, D.C., and Baltimore ===
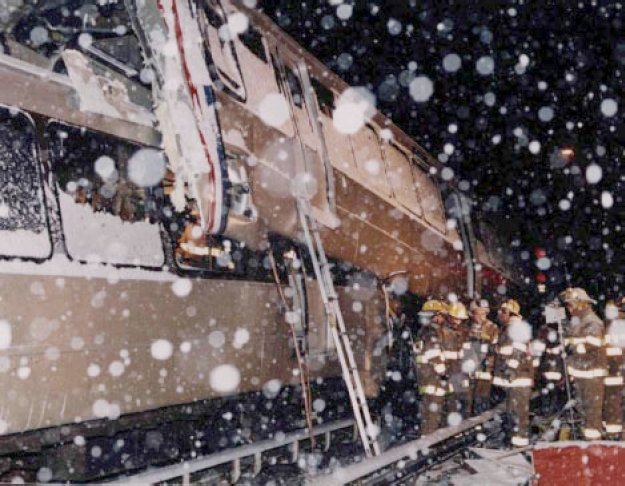
Picture taken of the aftermath of a Washington Metro accident at Shady Grove station during the blizzard, which resulted in the death of a Metro operator

Snow began falling on Washington, D.C., and Baltimore during the early afternoon of January 6, and continued at a consistent rate until mid-afternoon the next day. At that time, the metro area received 13 to 17 inches (33 to 43 cm), and after a few hours of sleet and then a complete stop for several hours, it seemed the worst was over; but overnight, as the storm slowly crawled northward, extremely heavy bands of snow came in from the east. These bands created whiteout conditions as winds gusted past 40 miles per hour (64 km/h), along with thunder and lightning. By the morning of January 8, the bands tapered off, and the metro area was left with a blanket of 15 to 25 inches (38 to 64 cm) of snow. Baltimore received 22.5 inches (57 cm) and Washington Dulles International Airport received 24.6 inches (62 cm). Many areas north and west in Maryland and West Virginia received well over 2 feet (61 cm) with a few locations in the mountains of West Virginia and Virginia receiving up to 4 feet (1.2 m).

In DC, it was known as the "Blizzard of '96" or the "Great Furlough Storm", because it occurred just after the 1996 federal government shutdown, and—given that the federal government was closed due to the storm—lengthened the time that federal employees were away from their jobs in the DC area. Because of unseasonably warm weather in mid-January and a warm rain exceeding an inch (2.5 cm) on Monday, January 15, the snow melted quickly and caused the worst winter flooding in decades for river and stream valleys from Southwest Virginia to New York.

=== Philadelphia and Pennsylvania ===
30.7 inches (78 cm) of snow fell in Philadelphia (as measured at the official city observation location, Philadelphia International Airport), the most of any major city in the storm's path. It remains the city's all-time greatest snowstorm, compared to its previous greatest snowstorm which was a "mere" 21.3 inches (54 cm). Most of those 30.7 inches (78 cm), 27.6 (70), fell in just 24 hours, a new record for the city for the most snow in 24 hours. The mayor declared a state of emergency, and only police and other emergency workers were permitted to drive on city streets, leaving the city to pedestrians.

For three days, city trucks loaded with plowed snow dumped their contents into the Schuylkill and Delaware rivers, eventually causing major problems with the natural flow of the rivers. It is a rare occurrence for trucks to "dispose of snow" in the Philadelphia area; the snowfall amounts usually do not warrant it. However, the snow was so extensive that plowing would have caused massive snow piles. City officials had no choice but to resort to hauling the snow to nearby rivers. Disposal of snow became a major issue, but temperatures quickly returned to normal and began to quickly clear the snow. This resulted in flooding when, on January 19, a jet stream disturbance from the Gulf of Mexico caused a rapid melt, followed by thunderstorms, which both brought three inches (76 mm) of rain, and caused the snow to melt 20 inches (51 cm) in one day; or equivalent to 2 inches (5 cm) of rain. Philadelphia saw its worst flooding in twenty years. Damages were estimated to reach US$1 billion.

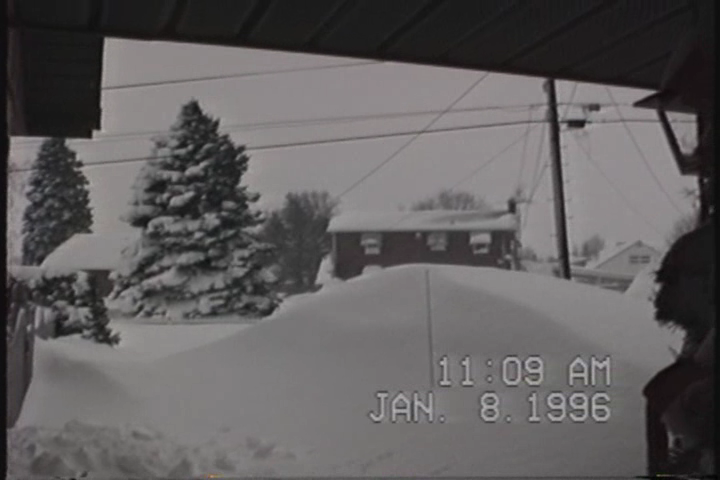
Blizzard of 1996, Temple, Pennsylvania

Snowfall accumulations averaged 20 to 22 inches (51 to 56 cm) in Monroe, Carbon and eastern Schuylkill Counties, around 2 feet (61 cm) in Lehigh and Northampton Counties, 24 to 33 inches (61 to 84 cm) in Berks County, 20 to 26 inches (51 to 66 cm) in Chester and Delaware Counties, 20 to 30 inches (51 to 76 cm) in Montgomery and Bucks Counties. Other individual accumulations included 33 inches (84 cm) in Ontelaunee Township (Berks), 30 inches (76 cm) in Reading (Berks) and Palm and Souderton (Montgomery), 28 inches (71 cm) in Perkasie (Bucks), and 26 inches (66 cm) in Glenmoore (Chester).

=== New Jersey ===
Snow began falling during the predawn hours of January 7 and became heavy at times during the morning. Blizzard conditions developed during the afternoon and evening as strong northeast winds developed around the intensifying low pressure. During the afternoon hours, precipitation in far southern New Jersey changed to sleet and freezing rain as the low brought in warm air at mid-levels, but remained all snow across the rest of the state. During the evening and overnight hours the snow mixed with sleet as far north as central sections of the state as the low center approached the state from the south. A lull developed in the precipitation in the pre-dawn hours of January 8 as the low center was just off the New Jersey coast, but wraparound moisture brought another period of snow to the state as the low pulled away during the later morning and early afternoon hours of January 8.

Accumulations averaged 24 to 27 inches (61 to 69 cm) in Sussex County, 20 to 27 inches (51 to 69 cm) in Warren County, 23 to 28 inches (58 to 71 cm) in Morris County, generally 20 to 30 inches (51 to 76 cm) in Bergen, Passaic, Union, Hudson, Essex, Hunterdon, Somerset, Mercer, and Monmouth counties, 19 to 32 inches (48 to 81 cm) in Middlesex County, 18 to 31 inches (46 to 79 cm) in Burlington County, 16 to 24 inches (41 to 61 cm) in Salem, Gloucester, and Camden counties, 24 inches (61 cm) inland and 10 to 14 inches (25 to 36 cm) at the coast in Ocean County, and 10 to 18 inches (25 to 46 cm) in Cumberland, Atlantic, and Cape May counties. In addition to the heavy snow, wind gusts reached hurricane force along the coast during the evening of the 7th, with an 81 miles per hour (130 km/h) gust recorded in Ocean Grove. While accumulations were lighter along the shore, the strong northeasterly flow produced moderate coastal flooding at the time of high tide on the evening of January 7, with tides 3 to 4 feet (0.91 to 1.22 m) above normal. The tide reached 7.5 feet (2.3 m) above mean low water in Atlantic County and 8.5 feet (2.6 m) above mean low water in Cape May County. Fortunately, winds switched to the northwest before worse flooding could occur at high tide on the morning of January 8.

The state of New Jersey recorded its second-largest snowstorm at Edison, where 32 inches (81 cm) fell (the greatest single storm record being 34 inches (86 cm) at Cape May in the Great Blizzard of 1899). Elizabeth, New Jersey, also reported 32 inches (81 cm) of snow. Newark, the state's largest city, received a record-setting 27.8 inches (71 cm), while Trenton, the capital, received 24.6 inches (62.5 cm). All roads in the state were closed, including the entire length of the New Jersey Turnpike for the first time in that road's history. Over two-thirds of the state was buried under 2 feet (61 cm) of snow, making this storm the state's most paralyzing snowstorm of the 20th century. Places such as Roselle and Linden received around 30 inches (76 cm). New Jersey was, along with other states, put into a state of emergency.

"Two feet of snow was blasted into Greater Trenton by 50 mph winds that created giant drifts, paralyzing the region and the rest of the Northeast for a week, One writer called it the most "sadistic" storm of our century. The Blizzard of '96 stranded hundreds of people at Trenton's train station; left thousands without electricity and heat for days; closed most schools and government offices for a week; cut off an estimated US$1 billion in Jersey commerce; forced the National Guard into service rescuing state troopers from snowbound police cruisers; and created strife between officials and residents demanding the plowing of their little streets. In the second week of January 1996, it can be said, many locales across the region looked like they did in the old pictures taken of them during the infamous Blizzard of '88: Houses drifted under; snowed-in main streets that looked like ghost towns; no cars or people on the streets."

=== New York ===
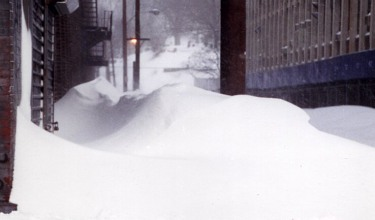
Blizzard of 1996 snowdrifts, Yonkers, New York.

New York City's Central Park officially recorded 20.2 inches (51 cm) for its fourth-largest single snowfall (records going back to 1869), but many locations in the other boroughs and suburbs recorded over 30 inches (76 cm) of snow. Schools in New York City's boroughs closed because of snow for the first time since the Blizzard of 1978, 18 years earlier. While most suburban districts in the area close for snow several times each winter, in the city itself they rarely do because of relatively easy access to underground subways whose ability to run is not appreciably affected by snowstorms of moderate to large accumulation; however, in this snowstorm, the transit network was significantly disrupted. Buses were unable to run, and subway service was limited. Lines that ran in open cut and surface routes were shut down for two days.

=== New England ===
Providence, Rhode Island, received 24 inches (61 cm) of snow, while Boston and Hartford, Connecticut, both received 18.2 inches (46 cm). Up to 33 inches (84 cm) of snow fell in the Berkshire Mountains of western Massachusetts and the northern hills of Connecticut. While this was a major snow event for southern New England, the Blizzard of 1996 was not as intense as other recent events, notably the Blizzard of 1978 and the March 1993 Superstorm. Snowfall amounts decreased sharply as one moved further north, with northern Vermont, New Hampshire, and Maine receiving little more than snow flurries from this event.

== Blizzard status ==
Despite the storm's common name as the "Blizzard of 1996", some of the few observing sites to record true blizzard conditions were Trenton-Mercer Airport near Trenton, New Jersey, and Morristown Municipal Airport located east of Morristown, New Jersey, with Morristown recording wind gusts in excess of 63 miles per hour (101 km/h). During the afternoon of January 7, the airports recorded the necessary three consecutive hours of frequent wind gusts of at least 35 miles per hour (56 km/h) combined with a prevailing visibility consistently below 0.25 miles (400 m) along with falling and blowing snow, meeting the official NWS standard of a blizzard. This indicates that the sites experienced some of the worst conditions on the entire East Coast. All other New Jersey observing sites, as well as most sites in neighboring states, failed to observe true blizzard conditions, though many stations did observe blizzard conditions for less than the necessary three consecutive hours.

== Snowfall accumulation totals ==
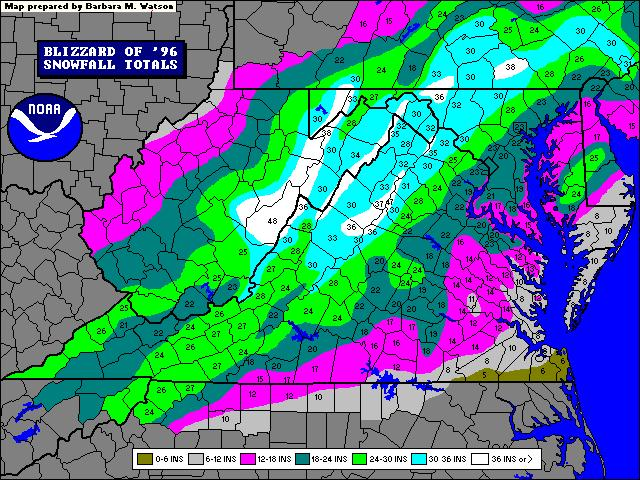
Blizzard of 1996 Mid Atlantic Snowfall accumulation. (By National Weather Service in Sterling, Virginia.)

State	City/location	Amount (inches)	Amount (cm)	References
VA	Big Meadows	47	120	
WV	Pocahontas County	40–48	100–120	
VA	Stanley	42.0	107	
PA	York County	35–40	89–102	
MD	Takoma Park	36	91	
PA	Shippensburg	35	89	
MA	Berkshire County	33	84	
CT	Litchfield County	33	84	
VA	Luray	33	84	
MD	Frostburg	32	81	
NJ	Edison	32	81	
VA	Front Royal	32	81	
NJ	Bordentown	31	79	
PA	Philadelphia	30.7	78	
NJ	Raritan	30	76	
NJ	Whitehouse Station	30	76	
NJ	Howell	30	76	
NJ	Moorestown	30	76	
NJ	Hazlet	29.8	76	
NJ	Elizabeth	28.8	73	
NJ	Freehold Borough	28	71	
NJ	Newark	27.8	71	
NJ	McGuire Air Force Base, Wrightstown	27	69	
NC	Boone	26	66	
NJ	Califon	26	66	
PA	Allentown	25.9	66	
VA	Dulles International Airport	24.6	62	
NJ	Lambertville	24.8	63	
NJ	Trenton	24.6	62	
NJ	Bound Brook	24.5	62	
NJ	Pottersville	24	61	
RI	Providence	24	61	
NJ	Long Branch	24	61	
NJ	Toms River	24	61	
MD	Baltimore	22.5	57	
NJ	New Brunswick	22.6	57	
VA	Roanoke	22.2	56	
NJ	Sandy Hook	22	56	
NJ	Mount Holly	22	56	
NJ	Flemington	20.3	52	
NY	Central Park, New York City	20.2	51	
NJ	Plainfield	19	48	
MA	Boston	18.2	46	
CT	Hartford	18.2	46	
NJ	Willingboro	19.4	49	
NJ	Marlton	18	46	
NJ	Princeton	18	46	
VA	National Airport, Arlington	17.1	43	
NJ	Hightstown	17.1	43	
CT	Bridgeport	16	41	
NJ	Somerville	16	41	
NJ	Indian Mills	16	41	
NJ	Beach Haven	15	38	
NC	Hickory	14	36	
VA	Richmond	12	30	
NJ	Cape May City	10.1	26	
PA	Pittsburgh	9.6	24	

== See also ==
- Blizzard
- January 2016 United States blizzard – Very similar blizzard that affected almost the same areas with identical snow totals 20 years after this one.
- Nor'easter
