= USLHT Zizania =

Tender of the United States Lighthouse Service and Navy

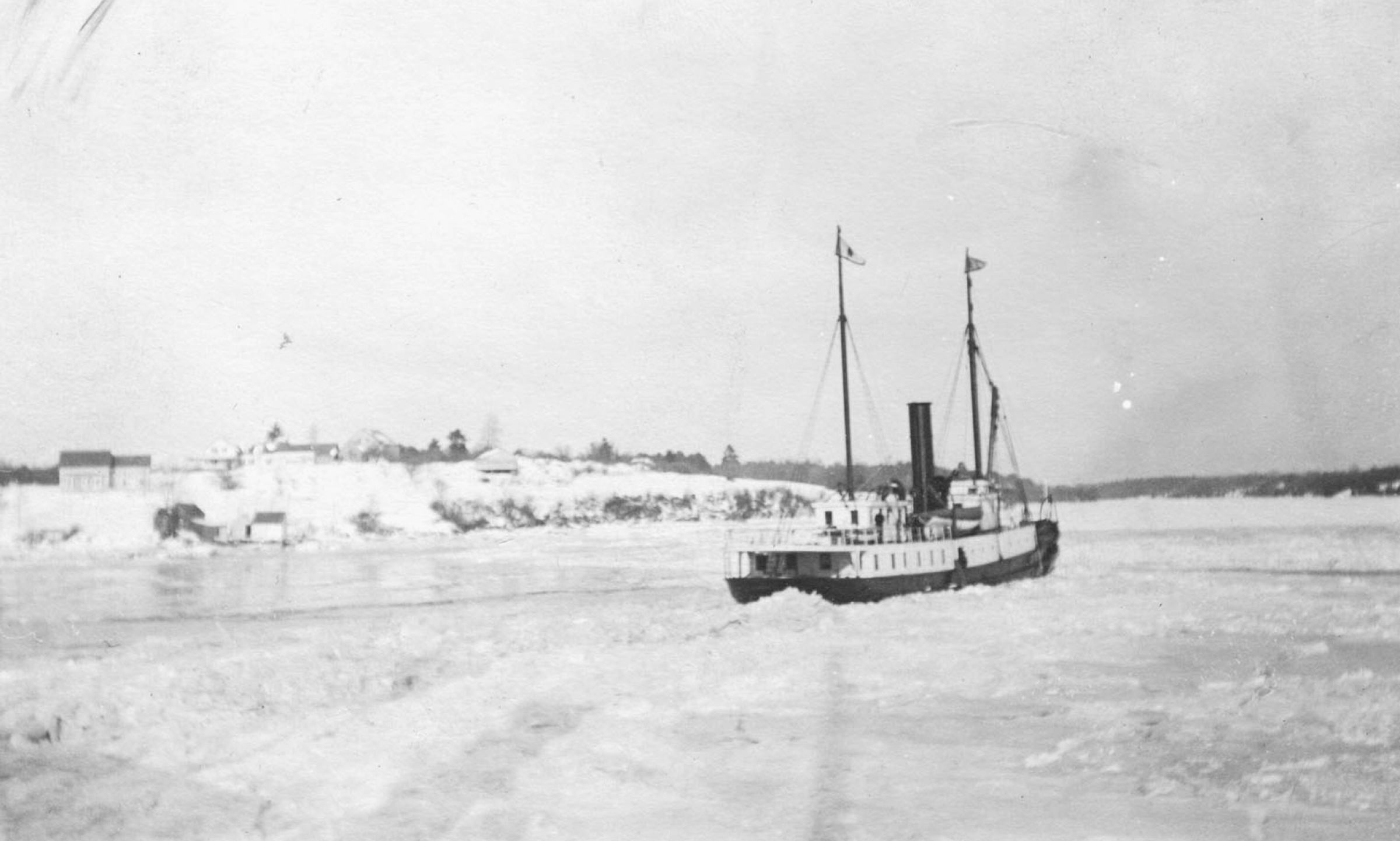
- USLHT Zizania breaking ice

History

United States
- Name: Zizania
- Operator: US Lighthouse Service (1888-1917); US Navy (1917-1919); US Lighthouse Service (1919-1925)
- Builder: H.A. Ramsey and Son
- Laid down: 2 June 1887
- Launched: 17 January 1888
- Commissioned: 12 November 1888
- Decommissioned: 18 November 1924
- Identification: Signal Letters GVNK; Radio Call Sign: NZZ
- Fate: Sold, January 1925
- Name: Zizania
- Owner: James A. Ross (1925-1939); Pan American Shippers (1939-1942)
- Identification: Official Number 225632; Radio Call Sign MGCR
- Fate: Requisitioned by War Shipping Administration, 1942
- Name: Adario
- Recommissioned: 26 August 1943
- Decommissioned: 17 April 1946
- Reclassified: YTM-743, 4 August 1945
- Stricken: 1 May 1946
- Identification: YNT-25; Radio call sign NCLE
- Fate: sold, likely in early 1947, scrapped likely in 1948

General characteristics
- Displacement: 643 tons
- Length: 161 ft (49 m)
- Beam: 27 ft (8.2 m)
- Draft: 9 ft (2.7 m)
- Depth of hold: 12 ft (3.7 m)
- Speed: 9.1 knots (16.9 km/h; 10.5 mph)
- Complement: 5 officers, 16 men

USLHT Zizania was a steel-hulled steamship built as a lighthouse tender in 1888. Over four decades of government service she sailed for the U.S. Lighthouse Service, and the U.S. Navy. She was homeported first in Wilmington, Delaware, and then in Portland, Maine during her Lighthouse Service Years. She served the U.S. Navy in both World War I and World War II. She was renamed during her World War II service, becoming USS Adario, a net tender based at Naval Operating Base Norfolk.

The ship appears to have been largely inactive between her retirement from the Lighthouse Service in 1925 and her requisition by the War Shipping Administration in 1942. After her World War II service, she was sold by the government and likely scrapped in 1948.

== Construction and characteristics ==
The U. S. Lighthouse Board requested bids for Zizania during the last week of December 1886. Shipbuilder H.A. Ramsey and Son was the low bidder and won the contract for Zizania in February 1887. Her keel was laid on 2 June 1887. Zizania was launched from the company's Baltimore, Maryland shipyard on 17 January 1888. The government revoked the contract and seized the vessel in June 1888 because H.A. Ramsey and Son went out of business. Bids to complete the ship were solicited. Two bids were received and rejected as too costly. The Lighthouse Board opted to finish the ship itself with day laborers. The Lighthouse Board's absolute requirement, under then current law, to accept the lowest bid no matter how unqualified the bidder was a long-running issue. The Board used Zizania's history as an argument to modify the law to allow unqualified low-bidders to be rejected by the Secretary of the Treasury.

Her hull and bulwarks were constructed of steel plating on angle-steel frames. The steel components were riveted together. She was 161 feet (49 m) long, with a beam of 27 feet (8.2 m), a draft of 9 feet (2.7 m), and a depth of hold of 12 feet (3.7 m). Her hull form was unusual for the time with several adaptations which were expected to make her more resistant to ice damage. Her twin propellers and rudders were protected by twin skegs. Her hull ended in two sternposts. Her gross register tonnage was 417 and her net register tonnage was 331. She displaced 643 tons.

She was propelled by two double-expansion steam engines. The cylinders of the engines had diameters of 15 inches (38 cm) and 28 inches (71 cm) and a stroke of 27 inches (69 cm). The two engines drove two bronze propellers. Her two engines each had an indicated horsepower of 325. She had a single coal-fired boiler. Her machinery gave her a speed of 10.5 miles per hour (16.9 km/h).

She had two masts and was schooner-rigged. She did sail on occasion to save fuel. Her fore-mast was more frequently used as a derrick for her buoy tending duties.

Her officers' quarters were on the main deck. The district inspector's cabin was about 33 feet (10 m) in length and covered the full width of the deck in the aft part of the ship. In this cabin were two staterooms on the starboard side, and a small office, locker, pantry, toilet, and wash stand on the port side. Forward of the inspector's cabin, her galley was equipped to serve fifty people. Adjacent to the galley was the officers' mess room and pantry. The engineer, assistant engineer, and mate all had separate cabins, each with a small desk and washstand, forward of the officers' mess. Zizania's captain had a cabin immediately aft of the pilot house.

Aft, below the main deck, was an after cabin with four bunk beds and clothes lockers. Forward, below the main deck, was enlisted crew berthing in a cabin 17 feet (5.2 m) long. Ten bunks with appropriate lockers for clothes storage were in this forecastle cabin.

Zizania's original cost was variously reported as $48,739.14 and $66,173.30.

Over her decades of service, many repairs and upgrades were done to the ship. Her original coal-fired boiler was replaced in November 1893. Electric lights were installed in February 1900. The ship was equipped with a radio by 1920. Her boiler was converted from burning coal to oil in 1939.

Zizania's namesake was a species of wild rice eaten by Native Americans. Adario's namesake was Adario, a leader of the Wendat people.

The ship's complement as a lighthouse tender in 1907 was 5 officers and 16 men, and rose to 6 officers and 22 men by 1922.

== Government service (1888-1925) ==
=== US Lighthouse Service, 4th District (1888-1913) ===
Zizania was commissioned on 12 November 1888. She sailed from Baltimore to her new homeport in Delaware Bay on 23 November 1888. The ship was assigned to the 4th Lighthouse District and homeported at Wilmington, Delaware. She replaced USLHT Geranium there.

Zizania first sailed when the U.S. Lighthouse Service was controlled by the U.S. Lighthouse Board, a bureau of the U.S. Department of the Treasury. In this quasi-military organization, each Lighthouse District had an Inspector, typically a Naval officer, and an Engineer, typically an officer from the Army Corps of Engineers. While the Engineer was primarily responsible for the construction and maintenance of lighthouses, piers, and other structures, the Inspector was primarily responsible for supplying lighthouses and lightships, and maintaining buoys and lightships in their assigned locations. The inspector was charged with visiting each lighthouse and lightship four times per year and reporting on their condition to the Lighthouse Board. Zizania supported the Inspector of the 4th Lighthouse District. In 1903, the Lighthouse Board was transferred to the newly created U.S. Department of Commerce and Labor. Since the Lighthouse Board still had operational control of the U.S. Lighthouse Service, little changed in Zizania's operations. In 1910, Congress abolished the Lighthouse Board and replaced it with the all-civilian Lighthouse Bureau of the Department of Commerce and Labor. This change did impact the ship's work in that District Inspectors and Engineers were replaced by a single District Supervisor. All ships did any construction, maintenance, or buoy tending they were assigned.

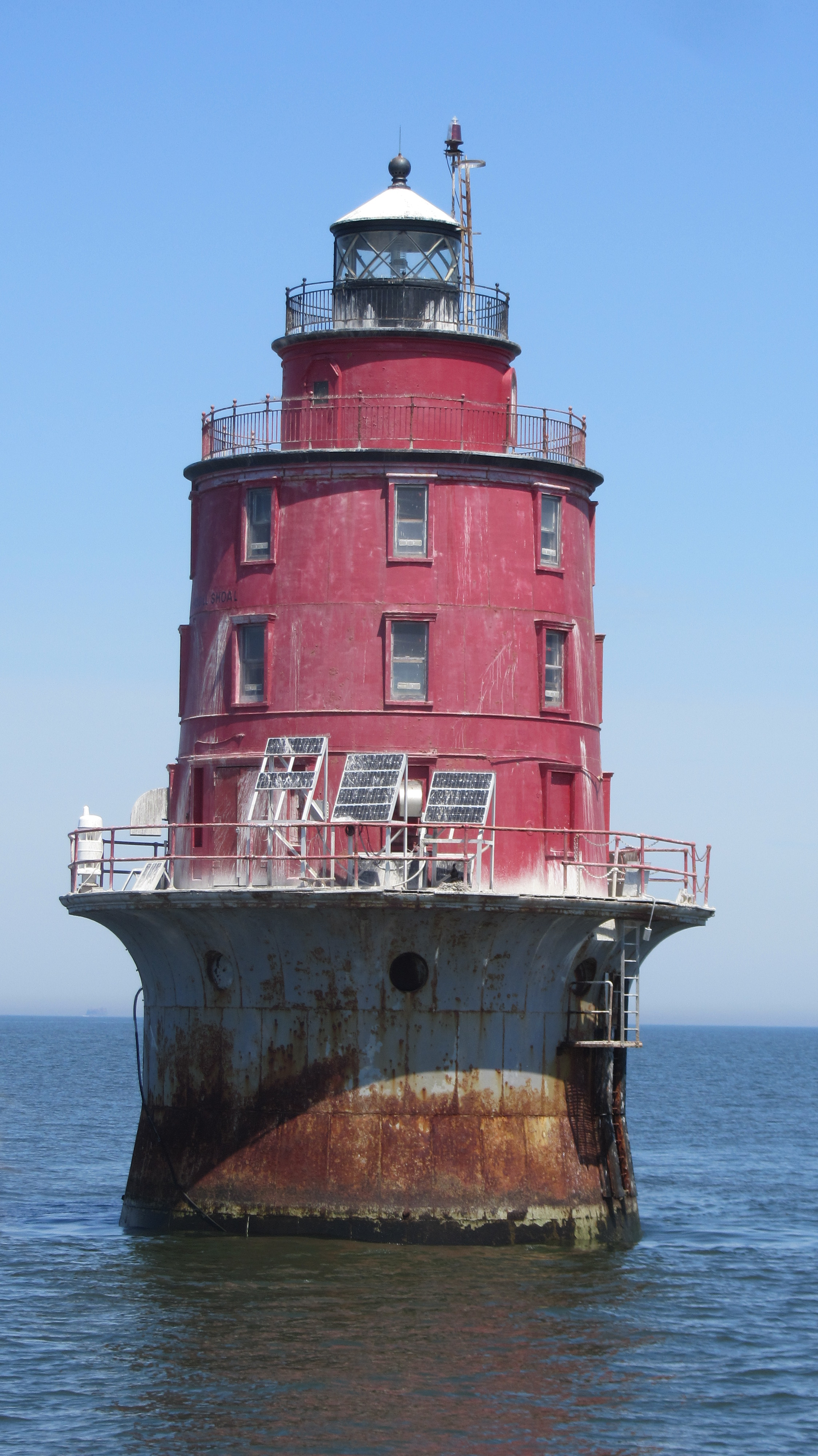
Miah Maull Shoals lighthouse. Zizania assisted in constructing this lighthouse in 1909.

Supporting the District Inspector, Zizania had a number of missions in Delaware Bay, the Delaware River, and nearby waterways. She placed new buoys, cleaned and maintained existing buoys, reset buoys that were moved off-station by storms, and ice, and removed buoys that were worn out. Every fall she would swap large iron buoys, which could be damaged by ice, with small, light wooden spar buoys. In the spring, she would swap them back. She supported lightships, both by towing them into position and by bringing them supplies. Lighthouses were operated by lighthouse keepers, who kept the lanterns fueled, their wicks trimmed, and their lenses clean. Many lighthouses were inaccessible from land, so lighthouse keepers depended on lighthouse tenders for supplies. Zizania was used to deliver food, water, wood, coal, lantern fuel, and other supplies to lighthouses.

Zizania required many repairs in her early years. One 1893 newspaper article reported that, "the cost of the frequent repairing of this boat almost equals her original cost." In 1905 the Lighthouse Board requested an appropriation of $125,000 for a new tender to replace her, noting, "The Zizania, which was built in 1887-1888, is no longer sufficiently seaworthy to send safely with a light-vessel in tow to ocean stations Cape May, Winter Quarter Shoal, and around the New Jersey seacoast to New York..." In 1907 Zizania was replaced by the newly built USLHT Sunflower as the District Inspector's tender. She remained in the 4th Lighthouse District but, as of 10 April 1907, supported the construction and maintenance efforts of the District Engineer. In this capacity, she hauled material for the construction of the Elbow Cross Ledge, and Miah Maull Shoals lights.

==== Public safety ====
By law and custom, Lighthouse Service vessels aided ships and mariners in distress, and Zizania was no exception. Here are a few of her rescues while assigned to the 4th Lighthouse District:

The schooner USC&GS Drift, on loan to the Lighthouse Board, was used as a lightship at Winter Quarter Shoal off Assateague Island, North Carolina. In October 1891 she lived up to her name when her mooring line snapped during a gale and she began drifting along the coast. She was disabled, leaking, and her pumps were inoperable. Since this was prior to shipboard radio, nobody knew where she had gone, or indeed if she was still afloat. Zizania was sent to look for Drift. The bark Daisy Reed found Drift about 25 miles ESE of Bodie Island and took her in tow for 21 hours. She turned Drift over to Zizania, which took her crew aboard, and towed the ship back to Fortress Monroe.

In June 1893, the pilot boat W. W. Ker went aground at Cape May. Zizania was able to tow her off without damage.

The British-flagged tanker Weehawken was sailing down the Delaware River on 10 October 1898 when she began to burn. Her cargo was 1.3 million gallons of refined oil. The fire went out of control and her 26 crewmen escaped in two lifeboats. They were rescued by Zizania.

The ship rescued six men who had been thrown into the Delaware River when their sailboat capsized in September 1899.

==== Notable events ====
A steam pipe burst on Zizania on 1 April 1898. Fireman George McCulloch was scalded to death.

The Delaware river was mined in 1898 in a defensive action in the Spanish-American War. Zizania laid the mines off Fort Delaware.

Zizania towed Relief Light Vessel No. 16 from her station at Fenwick Island Shoal to the light-house depot in Thompkinsville, New York in 1907.

=== US Lighthouse Service (1913-1917), 1st District ===
In 1912 Zizania took over USLHT Lilac's work in Portland, Maine on a temporary basis while she was out of service for repairs. In July 1913 Zizania was permanently reassigned to the 1st Lighthouse District and moved her homeport to Portland. Her duties were similar to those she performed in Chesapeake Bay, tending buoys, and supplying lighthouses.

As in Delaware Bay, Zizania assisted many ships and mariners in distress. She towed the dismasted sloop Mildred Goudy to a dock in Portland in 1914. In 1914 she rescued two men whose launch, Mineola, was trapped in ice. In 1916 Herman M. Ingalls, long-time captain of Zizania, received a letter of commendation from the Secretary of Commerce for the rescue of two men who had fallen off a dock in Portland, Maine. In two separate incidents in 1917 Zizania rescued four men from drowning.

=== US Navy (1917-1919) ===
On 11 April 1917 President Wilson issued Executive Order 2588 transferring a number of lighthouse tenders to support the American effort in World War I. Zizania was transferred to the U.S. Department of War, which placed her under the operational control of the 1st Naval District. In April 1917 she was fitted with mine-laying equipment at the Charleston Navy Yard, but otherwise her naval service consisted of continuing her work as a lighthouse tender.

In December 1917 and January 1918, the Navy dispatched Zizania to break ice on the Kennebec River, and the harbors at Belfast, Searsport, Machias, Stockton Springs, and Rockland. Her commanding officer received a letter of commendation for the work on the Kennebec, which freed two coal barges.

After the war, on 1 July 1919, the components of the Lighthouse Service which had become part of the Navy were returned to the supervision of the Department of Commerce. Zizania was struck from the Navy List.

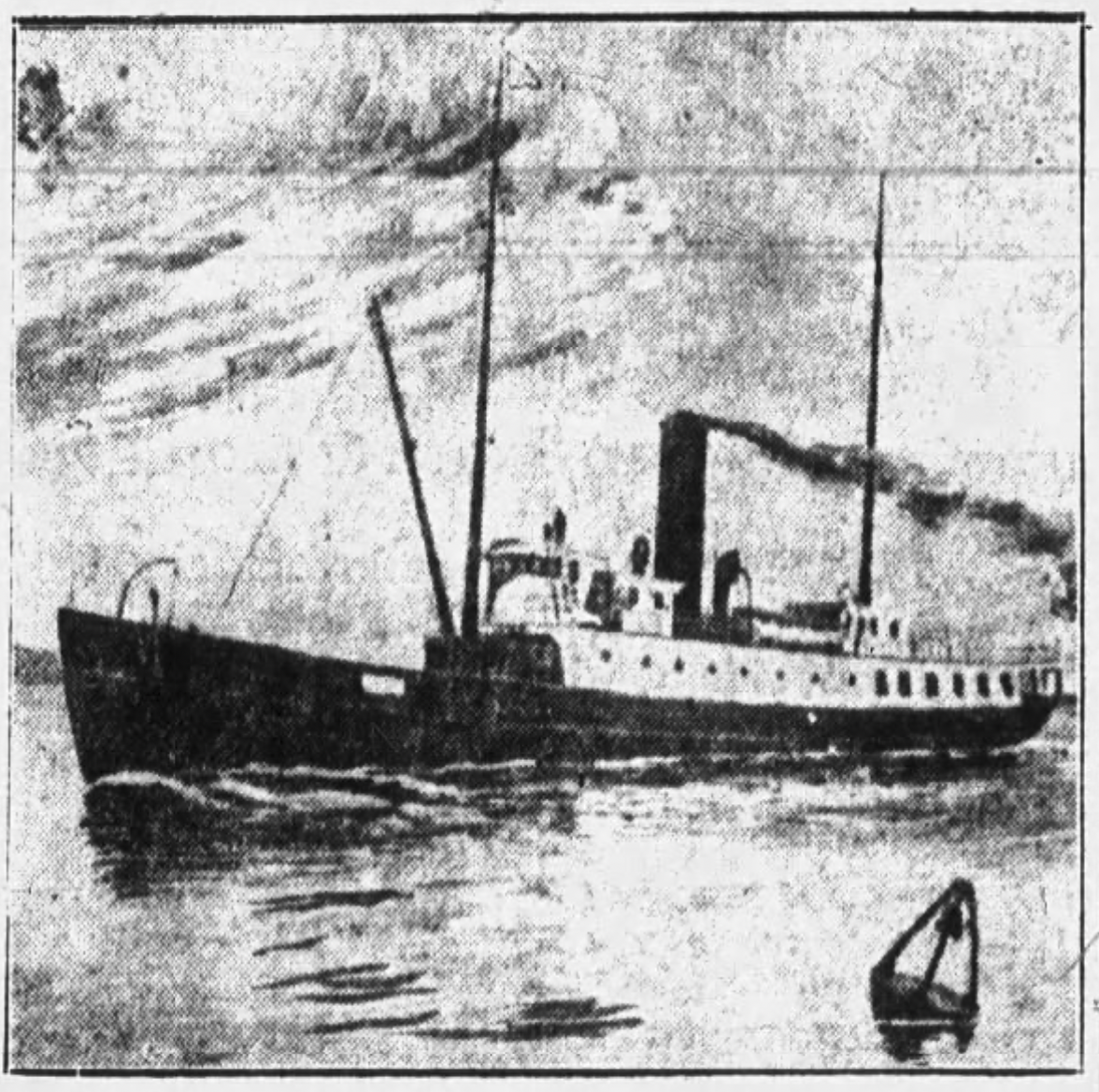
Zizania, sketched in 1924

=== US Lighthouse Service (1919-1925), 1st District ===
Back in civilian control, Zizania remained homeported in Portland, and continued her buoy tending and lighthouse keeping duties. In the winter months she was frequently used as an icebreaker so that communities dependent on marine transport for fuel, food, mail, and other supplies could be served. Like modern icebreakers, Zizania found it more effective to ride up over the ice and crush it with her weight than simply smashing into it with her bow. To achieve this, she loaded as much as 13 tons of stone and buoys on her aft deck, raising her bow enough to present the ice with the gentler angle of her keel.

Lighthouse Commissioner George R. Putnam announced the retirement of Zizania in July 1924, explaining that Portland required a larger ship to get all the work done. She was decommissioned on 18 November 1924 and replaced by USLHT Ilex.

Zizania was condemned as unseaworthy by a board of survey in December 1924. She was sold in January 1925 for $5,180 to the Boston firm of Thomas Butler & Co, which specialized in scrapping old ships to recover their iron and other valuable materials. The ship was towed from Portland to Boston by the tug Neponset, arriving 7 February 1925.

== Private ownership (1925-1942) ==
Zizania escaped being scrapped by Thomas Butler & Co. and was instead sold to Captain James A. Ross. He was Zizania's registered owner from 1926 to 1938. It appears he did little with the ship. A newspaper article from 1932 reported that the ship had been tied up at the Battery Wharf for five years. In 1933 Zizania took fishermen on day trips to try their luck. Fishing tackle and bait were included in the $1.50 fare. Luncheon was served, and there was a "beautiful salon for ladies." It appears that this business was short-lived as there is no mention of it in newspapers except in 1933.

Zizania was acquired by Pan American Shippers, Inc. of Miami in 1939. She sailed from Boston on 24 June 1939 for Miami, but ran out of coal and had to be towed in to Hampton Roads by USCGC Mendota. Once she reached Miami, her new owners converted her into a freighter, and converted her coal-fired boiler to oil. The work was contentious as the shipyard and other vendors sued Pan American Shippers for payment. These suits were settled in December 1939. Newspaper reports stated that the ship was sold to the Santa Maria Timber Company of Panama City, Panama in April 1940, but it is unclear if this sale ever took place. Her U. S. Coast Guard documentation shows the ship as owned by Pan American Shippers from 1939 to when she was acquired by the US War Shipping Administration in 1942.

== World War II service (1942-1946) ==
Zizania was requisitioned by the War Shipping Administration from Pan American Shippers, Inc. on August 20, 1942. On January 9, 1943, she was assigned to the Philadelphia Derrick & Salvage Company in Philadelphia, Pennsylvania under a general agency agreement. She was towed to her new assignment by the tug Kelvin Moran.

Zizania was inspected for suitability for Naval service on 2 July 1943 at Cape Henry, Virginia. She was purchased by the Navy on 9 August 1943 for use at the Net Depot at Naval Operating Base Norfolk. On 26 August 1943, the ship was renamed USS Adario, classified as a net tender, and designated YNT-25. She spent the remainder of World War II operating at Norfolk under the control of the Commandant, 5th Naval District. Among her chores as a net tender, Adario removed the skeleton net and boom defense on the York River in September and October 1944. During her term of service, Adario probably performed more tug duties than net tender chores for, on 4 August 1945, she was redesignated a medium tug, YTM-743.

While most of her Navy career was routine, Adario was called upon in a few unusual events. US Coast Guard cutter CG-83503 was being swept into the nets in Hampton Roads in January 1944. Adario passed her a line that held her off until a tow could be arranged. In February 1944 the Fleet Oiler USS Aucilla fouled an Army cable in Hampton Roads. Adario and two other net tenders came to her assistance and were able to free her. In a similar incident, Adario assisted tug USS Pinto which fouled the net.

The U.S. Navy dramatically reduced its fleet after World War II, and Adario was part of this downsizing. She was placed out of service on 17 April 1946, and her name was struck from the Navy list on 1 May 1946.

== Disposal of Zizania ==
The ship was transferred to the War Shipping Administration, which was responsible for disposing of surplus ships. It solicited bids on the ship, then in Claremont, Virginia, in November 1946. She was acquired by ship broker W. B. Fountain of Norfolk, Virginia. It was reported that after approximately two years he sold her to a Baltimore salvage company which scrapped her.
