= Wolf Trap Light =

Lighthouse in Virginia, United States

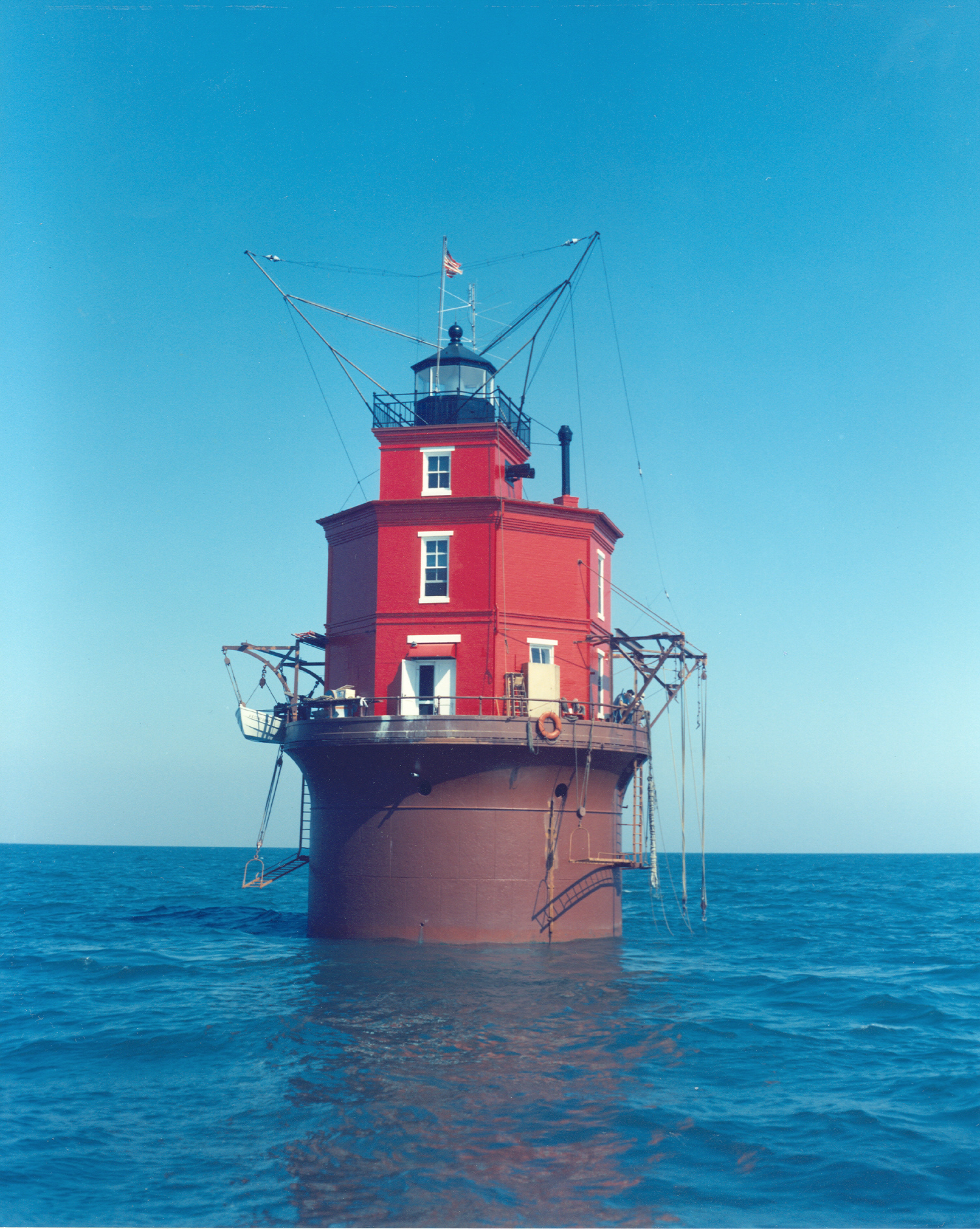
- Location: Off the west shore of the Chesapeake Bay, Virginia, northwest of the mouth of the York River
- Coordinates: 37°23′24″N 76°11′24″W

Tower
- Constructed: 1821 (lightship); 1870 (first fixed light)
- Foundation: Caisson
- Construction: Brick
- Automated: 1971
- Shape: Square tower on octagonal building
- Markings: Red brick on red-brown cylinder, black lantern
- Heritage: National Register of Historic Places listed place, Virginia Historic Landmark

Light
- First lit: 1894 (current structure)
- Deactivated: 2017
- Focal height: 52 feet (16 m)
- Lens: Fourth order Fresnel lens (original), VRB-25 (current)
- Range: 14 nautical miles (26 km; 16 mi)
- Characteristic: Flashing white 15s
- Wolf Trap Light
- U.S. National Register of Historic Places
- Virginia Landmarks Register
- Nearest city: Mathews, Virginia
- Area: less than one acre
- Built: 1894
- Architect: US Lighthouse Board
- MPS: Light Stations of the United States MPS
- NRHP reference No.: 02001434
- VLR No.: 057-0065

Significant dates
- Added to NRHP: December 02, 2002
- Designated VLR: September 10, 2003

Wolf Trap Light is a caisson lighthouse in the Virginia portion of the Chesapeake Bay, about seven and a half miles northeast of New Point Comfort Light. It is listed on the National Register of Historic Places.

== History ==
Wolf Trap Shoal juts into the bay from Winter Harbor, a point a few miles north of Mobjack Bay and the York River. It got its name from the 1691 grounding of HMS Wolf, a British naval vessel engaged in enforcing the Navigation Act and in combating piracy. In 1821 a lightship was stationed at this spot, and after refurbishment in 1854, the original ship was destroyed by Confederate raiders in 1861 during the Civil War. Two years later a replacement ship was put on station.

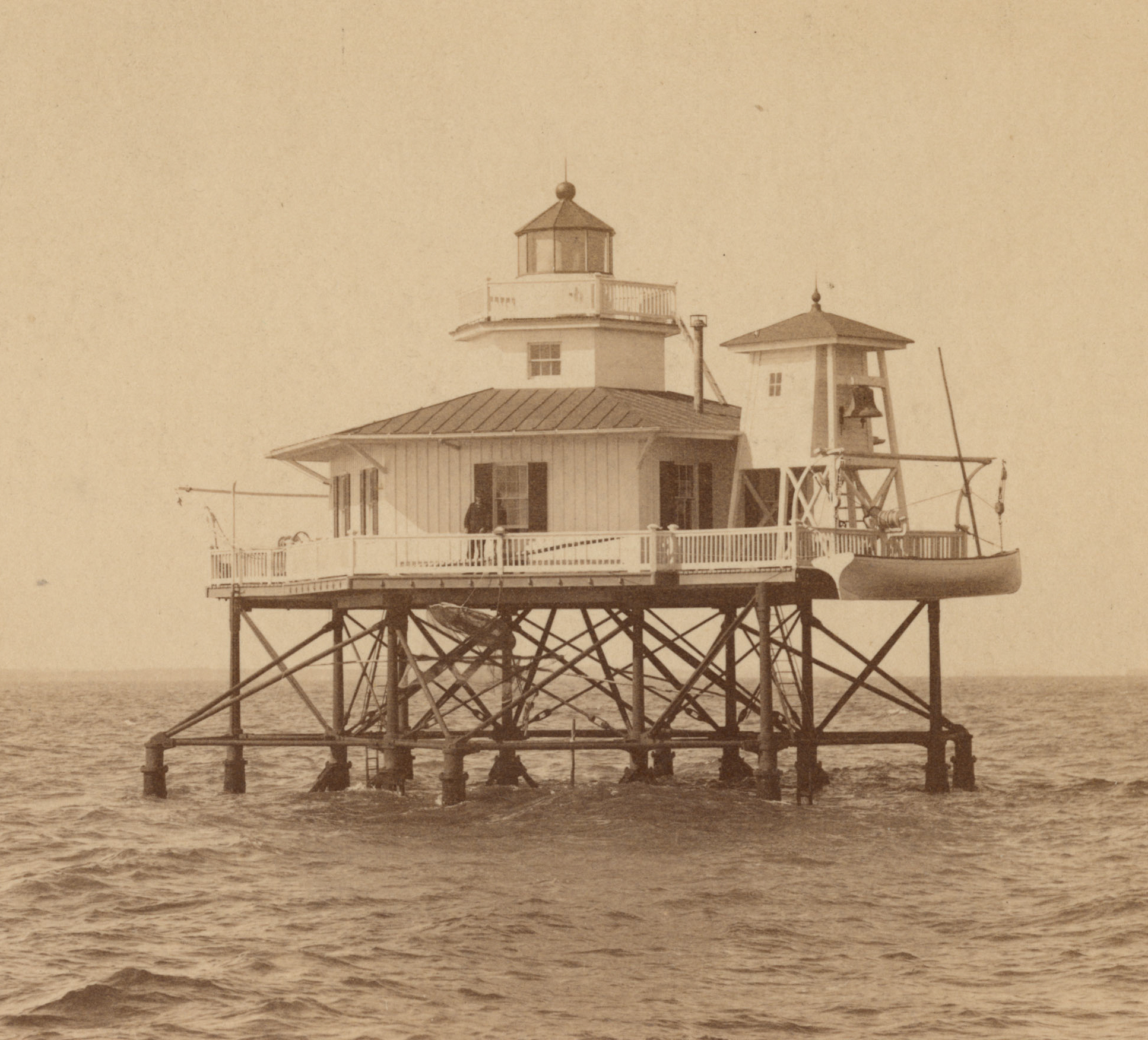
First Wolf Trap Light

In 1870 a screwpile lighthouse was constructed on a hexagonal foundation, the house being prefabricated at the station at Lazzaretto Point in Baltimore. This light survived until 22 January 1893, when ice tore the house from its foundation. The keeper was able to escape, but the house was found floating far to the south at Thimble Shoals, where the lantern and lens were recovered.

A lighthouse tender was put on station to serve as a temporary lightship and a request was put to Congress to appropriate funds for a new lighthouse. LV-46, assigned to tend the station, suffered a boiler casualty August 28, 1893, killing two of the crew, and was replaced by LV-97 until March 16, 1894, when LV-46 could return to the station.

On 3 March 1893 Congress approved $70,000 for the construction of the new light. The screw-pile design was abandoned because of its demonstrated weakness in the face of ice. The new design called for the lighthouse to sit on a cast-iron pier. The pier was a cylindrical shell that flared out at the top. The shell was 30 feet (9.1 m) in diameter at its base and 42 feet (13 m) tall. It was built of 210 cast-iron plates which were 1", 1 1/4", and 1 1/2" thick. They were bolted together on site with 1 1/4" bolts. The bottom 30 feet (9.1 m) of the shell was filled with concrete. The remainder of the shell became the cellar for the house. It contained water tanks, and separate rooms for the storage of coal, oil, and provisions. The house was built on top of the shell. It was made of brick, painted red in the late 1920s, standing two stories with the lantern on its roof. Unlike the Maryland examples, the roof is flat. Quantities of rip-rap were dumped around the base of the light to resist pressure from the ice.

The Engineer of the 5th Lighthouse District, Captain Eric Bergland, was responsible for the construction of the new light. While contractors and temporary laborers did much of the work, he and his staff were on site and used 5th District ships to support the construction. USLHT Jessamine hauled materials to the site, did test boring, and drove mooring piles.

The metalwork for the pier cost $6,950 (equivalent to $216,399 in 2024). This material was delivered to the Lazaretto Depot of the Lighthouse Board in November 1893. The cost of erecting the pier was $31,150 (equivalent to $969,901 in 2024). The pier was completed in April 1894. Jessamine began loading material for the superstructure of the light on 26 June 1894. The Lighthouse Board published a Notice to Mariners announcing that the new light would be lit on or about 30 September 1894.

Complaints about the visibility of the original fixed light led to a change to a flashing characteristic in 1895. Automation came in 1971. A 300mm acrylic lens was installed in 1984, to be replaced with the current VRB-25 in 1996. A set of black plywood blinds is installed in the lantern to block stray reflections from the panes.

Wolf Trap Light was offered to non-profit and historical organizations in 2004 under the National Historic Lighthouse Preservation Act. As no applications were received, it was put up for auction in 2005. Nick Korstad, of Seattle, Washington, purchased the station, and was unable to obtain financing for his plan to convert the light into a bed and breakfast, and after an unsuccessful attempt to auction the light on eBay, it was sold privately again. The light was bought by Dr. James Southard, Jr. for $119,000, and was again up for sale in 2012, including a nearby waterfront lot, for $288,000. In March 2023, the lighthouse was purchased by Richard Cucé of Quakertown, Pennsylvania for $125,000. Mr Cucé also owns Hooper Island Lighthouse near Dorchester County, Maryland.
