= USCGC Ilex =

American mine planter and buoy tender

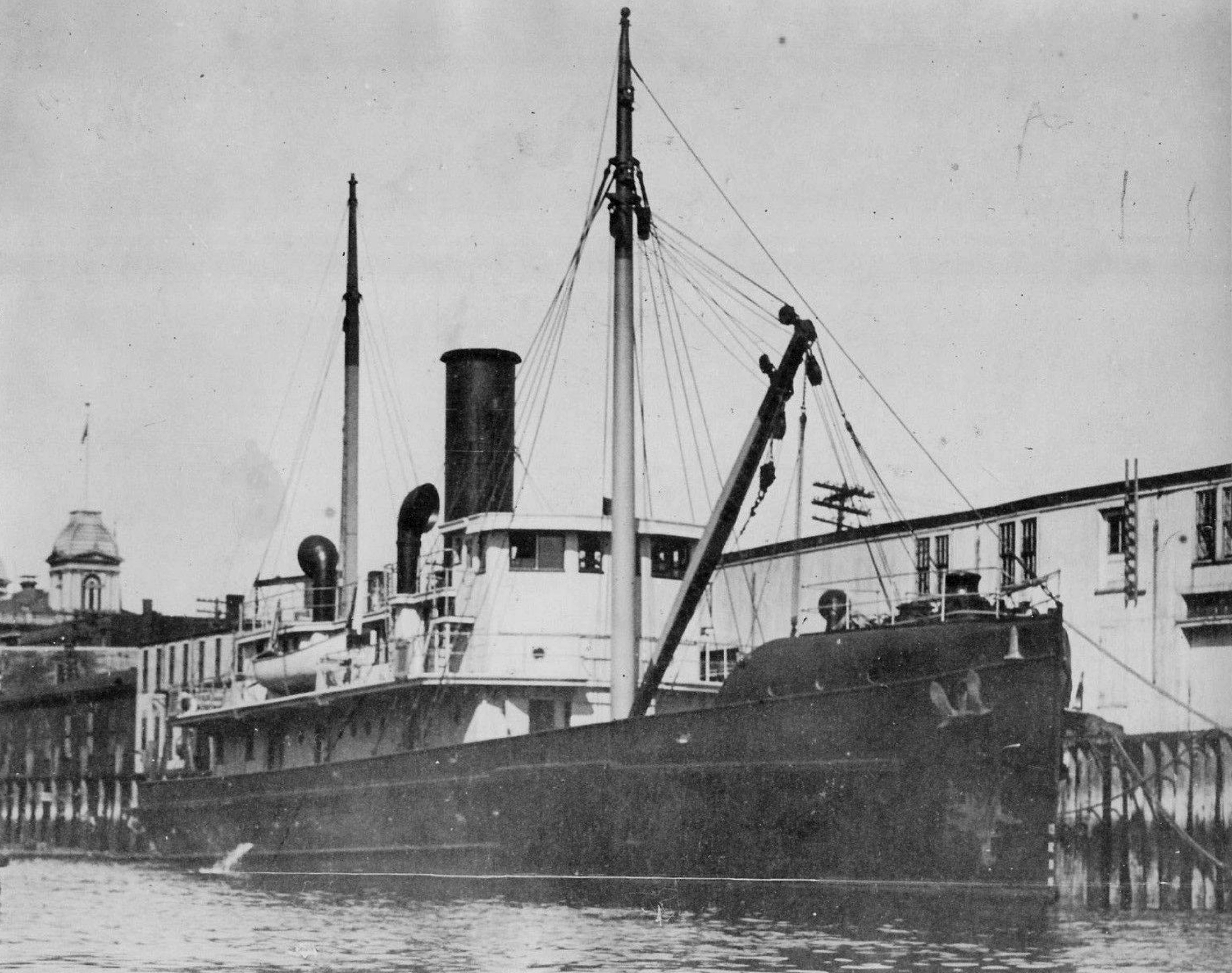
- USLHT Ilex in 1924

History

United States Army
- Name: Brigadier General Edmund Kirby
- Builder: Fabricated Ship Corporation
- Launched: 1920
- Fate: Transferred to the US Lighthouse Service, October 1921

United States Coast Guard
- Name: USLHT Ilex, 1924; USCGC Ilex, 1939
- Identification: Hull symbol: WAGL-222
- Fate: Sold 1947

General characteristics
- Displacement: 1,130 long tons (1,150 t)
- Length: 172 ft 6 in (52.58 m)
- Beam: 32 ft (9.8 m)
- Draft: 11 ft 6 in (3.51 m)
- Installed power: 2 steam engines, 1,040 horsepower
- Propulsion: 2 propellers

USAMP Brigadier General Edmund Kirby was a steel-hulled ship built for service in the U.S. Army as a mine planter. She was launched in 1920. The ship was transferred to the U.S. Lighthouse Service in 1921, and recommissioned as USLHT Ilex in 1924. When the Lighthouse Service became part of the U.S. Coast Guard in 1939, she was redesignated USCGC Ilex and was given the pennant number WAGL-222.

During most of her government career, Ilex's primary mission was to maintain and supply aids to navigation including buoys, lighthouses, and lightships. During World War II, when the Coast Guard was subject to U.S. Navy orders, she also maintained antisubmarine nets at a number of ports.

The ship was decommissioned and sold in 1947. She was converted to a commercial freighter, but this effort was short-lived. Ilex was burned in 1948.

== Construction and characteristics ==
In early July 1918 the Newton Engineering Company and Coddington Engineering Company, both of Milwaukee, Wisconsin, were awarded a contract for nine mine planters as joint contractors. Upon the award of the contract, Newton Engineering purchased all the assets of Coddington Engineering and changed its name to Fabricated Ship Corporation. Thus the nine ships, including Brigadier General Edmund Kirby, were built by Fabricated Ship. On the U.S. government side, the contract was executed by the US Army Quartermaster Corps, which was responsible for all Army shipbuilding, for eventual use by the Army Coast Artillery Corps.

The ship's hull and superstructure was built of steel plates riveted together. She was 172 ft 6 in (52.58 m) long overall, and 159 feet 6 inches (48.62 m) long on her waterline. She had a beam of 32 feet (9.8 m). Her light draft was 9 feet (2.7 m), and her maximum draft was 11 feet 6 inches (3.51 m). The ship's maximum displacement was 1,130 tons. Her gross register tons was 704 and her net register tons was 138.

The ship had two propellers which were driven by two Allis Chalmers compound, inverted, reciprocating steam engines. Their high pressure cylinders had a diameter of 18 inches (0.46 m), and the low pressure cylinders 36 inches (0.91 m), with a stroke of 24 inches (0.61 m). The indicated horsepower of these engines was 1,040. Steam for the engines was produced by two oil-fired boilers. Her maximum speed was 11 knots. Her fuel oil tanks had a capacity of 35,000 US gallons (130,000 L). Her unrefueld range at 10 knots was 1,800 miles.

Brigadier General Edmund Kirby's original cost was $540,000. Her original namesake was Brigadier General Edmund Kirby, a young artillery officer killed during the Battle of Chancellorsville.

== Service history ==
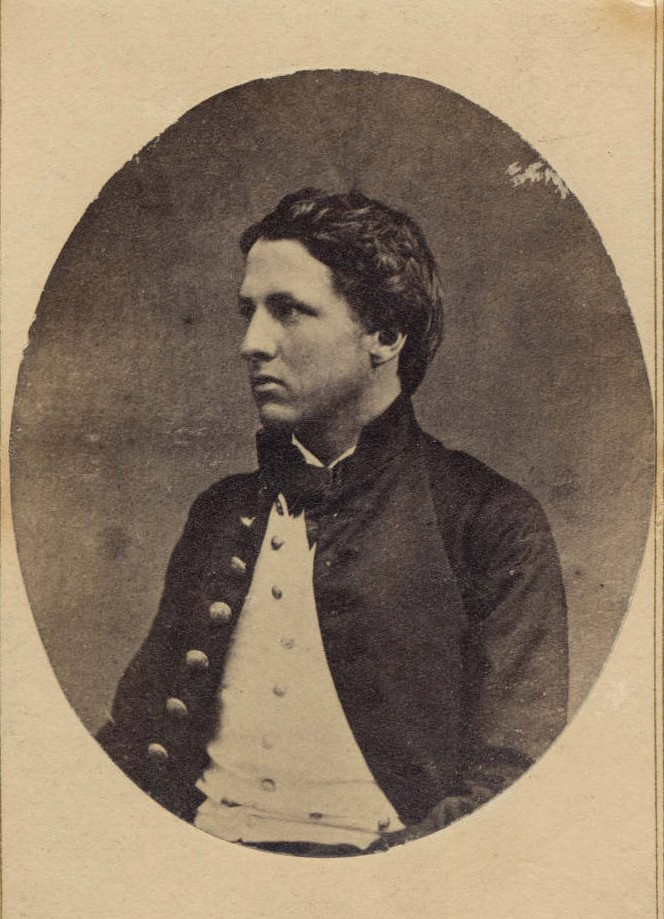
Edmund Kirby, the ship's original namesake

=== US Army service (1920–1921) ===
Brigadier General Edmund Kirby sailed from Milwaukee for New York on 5 September 1920. The ship arrived at Fort Totten on 11 October 1920, and caught fire the next day. Substantial portions of her superstructure were gutted. By April 1921 the Army had not found the funds to repair the ship, and it is not clear that repairs were made during Kirby's short Army service.

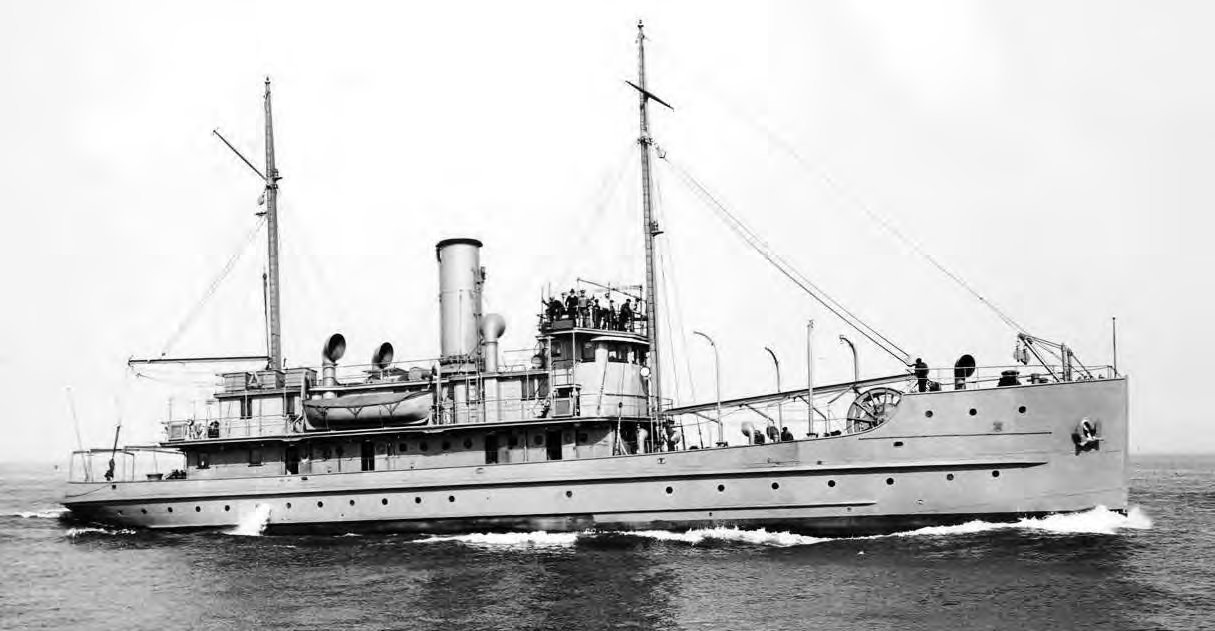
USAMP Brigadier Edmund Kirby, likely in 1920 before fire gutted her superstructure

During her Army career she had a crew of seven officers and 20 men.

The ship was assigned to Fort Wood where she was decommissioned on 6 October 1921 after less than a year of service. The rapid demobilization at the end of World War I led to a global glut of ships of all types, both civilian and military. The ship's mine planting equipment was removed and stored at Fort Wood for later use.

=== US Lighthouse Service (1921–1939) ===
On 7 October 1921, the War Department gave the Lighthouse Service three of the nine mine planters built by Fabricated Ship, including Kirby. These and three more sisterships given to the Lighthouse Service, were designated the Speedwell class. Substantial modifications were required to convert these ships into lighthouse tenders. Kirby was sent to the Lighthouse Service depot on Staten Island for this work. The forecastle was rounded and the anchor raised so that they would not foul buoys the ship was maintaining. A new steel deck was placed forward to allow the ship to handle heavy buoys. A more robust forward derrick, capable of hoisting 20 tons, and related steam-powered winches were installed. A new refrigeration plant was installed, and the crew quarters were rearranged. Converting Brigadier General Edmund Kirby cost $44,000.

The ship was renamed USLHT Ilex. She was commissioned in 1924 and assigned to the 1st Lighthouse District, with her homeport at South Portland, Maine. She replaced USLHT Zizania there. Her complement in 1924 was 6 officers and 23 men. Ilex was assigned the signal letters GVPH. She made her maiden voyage as a lighthouse tender on 22 October 1924.

Her duties included delivering fuel, supplies, and personnel to lighthouses and lightships, towing lightships to and from port, and placing, replacing, and maintaining buoys. This last activity was made more difficult by the severe ice conditions which prevailed along the New England coast which damaged, sank, and carried away buoys.

Ilex was also involved in a number of rescue missions. The five-masted schooner Gardineer G. Deering was dismasted and leaking when Ilex took her in tow on 28 October 1926. The disabled ship was brought to safety at Rockport, Maine. Later that year, on 4 December 1926, Ilex towed another leaking schooner, Gilbert Stancliff, into Portland. In September 1929, Ilex pulled the U.S. Army vessel General Robert N. Balchelder off the rocks on which she had grounded. In May 1939, she played a minor role in the rescue of crew from the sunken submarine Squalus, when she placed white can buoys around the scene to keep shipping traffic out of the rescue area.

=== United States Coast Guard (1939–1947) ===
The Lighthouse Service merged into the United States Coast Guard on 1 July 1939. The tender became USCGC Ilex and was assigned the pennant number WAGL-222. The change in organization did not affect the ship's duties, but it did impact the men who served aboard. They went from civilians to members of a uniformed military service, which changed a host of their employment conditions.

On 17 August 1939, Ilex hit the Carlton Bridge which spanned the Kennebec River in Bath, Maine. The ship lost control due to high currents and was jammed under the girders of the railroad bridge. She was pulled free by a tug, but was listing as she returned to port. Captain James Wright was relieved of his command within the week. The Coast Guard awarded the contract for repairs to Ilex in October 1939, but litigation between the State of Maine and the Federal Government took almost a decade to resolve. Maine was awarded $6,376 in 1947 for damages to the bridge.

On 1 November 1941 when President Roosevelt signed Executive Order 8929 transferring the Coast Guard from Treasury Department control to Navy department control, Ilex came under the orders of the 1st Naval District, part of the Eastern Sea Frontier. Her homeport remained South Portland, Maine. She spent the bulk of her war service assigned to the Naval Net Depot in South Portland tending anti-submarine nets around Casco Bay. At the end of World War II, Ilex was used to dismantle the nets in her area.

A highlight of her war-time service occurred on the night of 5 March 1943 when the American freighter Hartwelson went aground on Bantam Rock off the Maine coast. Heavy seas caused the ship to begin to break in two, and the stern section sank. A 2-inch line was eventually attached to the bow section and the entire 35-man crew of the ship were lowered into lifeboats and transferred to Ilex, which brought them safely to shore.

During the war she was equipped with SO-1 surface search radar.

== Demobilization, sale, and loss ==
In the general demobilization at the end of World War II, the aging ships of the Speedwell class were retired. Ilex arrived in Charleston, South Carolina on 13 March 1947 where she was decommissioned on 17 April 1947. All ships of the class were sold by the Coast Guard in 1947, Ilex on 14 October 1947. She was sold to R. Alexander Rodway of Spencer Cove, Newfoundland who intended to convert her into a freighter. The conversion took place at Norfolk Shipbuilding and Drydock.

In early May 1948 Ilex began commercial service, carrying 700 tons of coal to Bermuda. From there she was intended to sail to Barbados for a load molasses for Corner Brook, Newfoundland, her new home port. She was, however, forced to return to Norfolk on 10 May 1948 with engine trouble. It is not clear that she ever left. Ilex was reported to have burned in October 1948.
