= USC&GS Drift =

History

United States
- Name: USC&GS Drift Lightship LV-97
- Launched: 1876
- Fate: Retired 1918 after 22 years as the lightship LV-97, Sold April 27, 1920. Renamed W. J. Townsend, scrapped in 1945.

General characteristics
- Tonnage: 87 tons
- Length: 76 ft 0 in (23.16 m)
- Beam: 19 ft 6 in (5.94 m)
- Draught: 10 ft 8 in (3.25 m)
- Propulsion: schooner
- Complement: 5 officers, 14 men (1893)

USC&GS Drift was a United States Coast Survey schooner built in 1876 specifically to anchor in offshore waters to undertake current measurements. She was transferred to the United States Lighthouse Board on May 20, 1893 to become the lightship Light Vessel # 97 or (LV-97) on the Bush Bluff station until retirement and sale in 1918 to become the W. J. Townsend which was scrapped in 1945.

== Construction ==
The Coast Survey had recognized that current information had been lacking in publications but had been hindered by both lack of funding and risks associated with mooring vessels in deep waters or along dangerous coasts in order to collect the information. Congress specifically appropriated funding for such work in the 1875-1876 budget under which the 76 foot schooner Drift was constructed explicitly for this purpose. She was a schooner, 76 ft 0 in (23.16 m) in length with a beam of 19 ft 6 in (5.94 m) and draft of 10 ft 8 in (3.25 m).

== Service history ==
Drift was first sent out in June 1876 under Acting Master Robert Platt, USN, Assistant Coast Survey, to the Gulf of Maine to anchor in depths of up to 140 fathoms (840 feet/256 meters) to measure currents. The value of such measurements became immediately obvious as the Drift took advantage of her own observations in sailing and in a cited incident observed another ship struggling while she used currents effectively. During October–November the ship attempted further work but anchoring and effective measurements were obstructed by weather so the vessel returned to New York at the end of November. During this season, and subsequent work in the area the presence and location of tide rips was noted. There, while undertaking some hydrographic investigations in the entrance to New York harbor Drift was slightly damaged in a winter "hurricane" with temperature at 10°F (-12°C) during which she had to be towed away from the shore by two tugs. The report of the incident noted three other schooners and a steamboat were "thrown on the beach by the hurricane." After refit the Drift returned to the Gulf of Maine for current measurements. The schooner continued to occupy stations between Cape Sable and Nantucket observing currents and tide rips as well as incidental hydrography. Also noted as observed was "what seemed to be a very large round spar projecting twelve to fifteen feet out of the sea" that appeared on one side and then the other of the vessel while becalmed off Race Point, Cape Cod and "near it an object having the form of an enormous dorsal fin" that was observed with "good glasses." It was noted that none could say it was a creature, yet all on board agreed no "floating wreck was anywhere in sight."

Drift next began work in late February, 1879, off the Mississippi River Delta in the Gulf of Mexico. Both current and temperatures were observed at depths of 2 fathoms (3.7 m), 5 fathoms (9.1 m), 10 fathoms (18 m), 20 fathoms (37 m), 30 fathoms (55 m), 45 fathoms (82 m), 80 fathoms (150 m) and 90 fathoms (160 m) depending on depths at the stations. The ship made 497 temperature observations and 2,131 current measurements at thirteen stations before return to New York in late May of 1879. By this time other ships were studying currents, particularly the Blake and Bache with reference to the Gulf Stream. There is no mention of the ship in the fiscal year 1880 report and the report for fiscal year 1881 notes she, along with others, have been laid up for want of means with Drift at Brooklyn, New York.

With the summer of 1882 Drift began preparing in New York for work in Long Island Sound until October when she shifted for current observations to the entrance to Chesapeake Bay and then southward at Cape Hatteras, Cape Fear and Cape Lookout and then with stations in Florida at Cape Florida and Jupiter Inlet where she made a 24-hour current observation in the Stream while anchored in 200 fathoms (370 m).

After a late return from southern work in 1883 the ship was put to summer work in surveys of the bar at New York harbor entrance. This work apparently continued into 1884. The last mention of active survey by Drift is work in summer and fall of 1885 in the East River during multi-ship work in New York harbor.

In summer of 1887 the ship was loaned to New York for oyster bed surveys. The steamer Arago had been offered, but the expense of operating a steamer was too great for the state agency and Drift, out of commission for months and lying in a basin in the Navy Yard, was taken out, equipped and put to use.

Drift, previously on loan to the Lighthouse Board and returned to the Survey for loan to the State of Virginia for oyster bed surveys during the summer of 1892, was towed by the steamer Blake leaving on December 2, 1892 from Norfolk, Virginia to the Washington Navy Yard where the Blake was to prepare for her trip to Chicago and the World's Columbian Exposition. On May 20, 1893 "she was again loaned to the Lighthouse Board for temporary use as a lightship"—a loan that appears to have been permanent.

== Transfer to United States Lighthouse Board ==
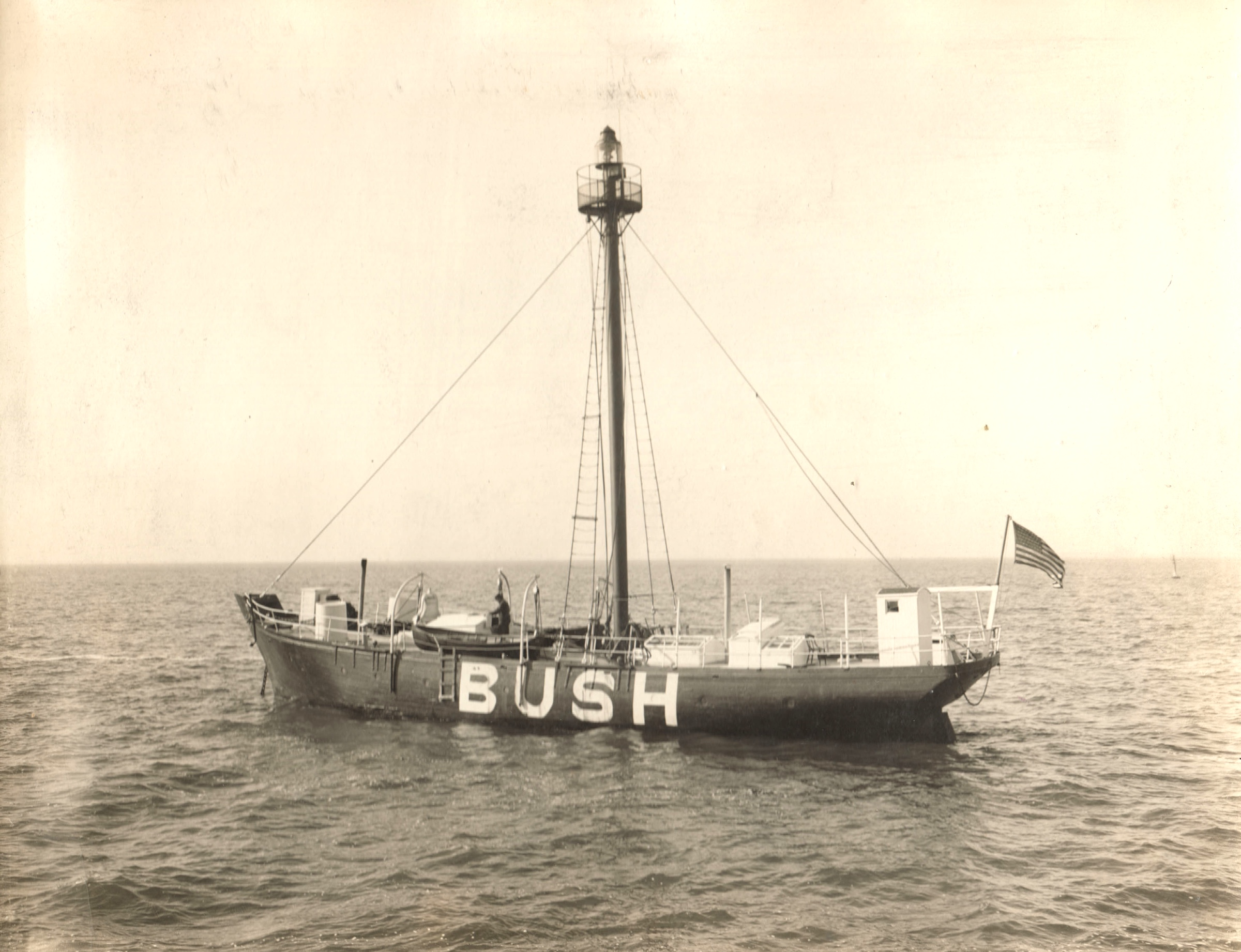
LV-97, Bush Bluff Lightship in 1914

After the May 20, 1893 transfer from Coast & Geodetic Survey to the United States Lighthouse Board (became United States Lighthouse Service, 1910) the ship become lightship LV-97 with a lantern lit with 8 oil lamps with reflectors. The light was converted to a 30 candle power electric light powered by batteries taken ashore for recharging with a revolving reflector in 1913 that produced a flash rated at 80,000 candle power and was said to be the first such system in the world. In 1915 this light was replaced with an oil/gas conventional lens lantern.

Stations for the vessel from date of transfer until 1895 and a permanent station include marking Wolf Trap shoal from December 10, 1893 until March 16, 1884 after a boiler explosion had disabled LV-46 on August 28, 1893 and that vessel was withdrawn for repair. The lightship was permanently stationed marking Bush Bluff shoal located in the Elizabeth River in Hampton Roads from 1895-1918 with a brief break 1911/1912 when the ship was replaced by a lighted buoy. LV-97 was temporarily used at other locations in the lower Chesapeake Bay. She was retired in 1918 after twenty-two years as a lightship, condemned, laid up in January 1918 and sold for $150 April 27, 1920.

== Private ownership ==
The new owner installed power propulsion and renamed the ship W. J. Townsend which was scrapped in 1945.
