= Thomas Smith (Gloucester politician) =

American merchant, patriot and politician

Member of the Virginia House of Delegates for Gloucester County
- In office Dec 3, 1832 – April 13, 1841
- Preceded by: William K. Perrin
- Succeeded by: Augustine Robins
- In office Dec 1, 1828 – Dec 5, 1830 Serving with John Billups
- Preceded by: James Baytop
- Succeeded by: position eliminated
- In office Dec 4, 1826 – Dec 2, 1827 Serving with Mann Page
- Preceded by: Richard G. Morris
- Succeeded by: James Baytop

Personal details
- Born: Thomas Smith; March 5, 1785 [
- Died: April 13, 1841 (aged 56) [
- Parent: Rev. Armistead Smith (father)
- Relatives: Thomas Smith Jr. (uncle)

Military service
- Allegiance: United States
- Branch/service: Virginia Militia
- Rank: captain

Thomas Smith (March 5, 1785 – April 13, 1841) was an American merchant, militia captain and politician in Virginia who represented Gloucester County, Virginia in the Virginia House of Delegates for most of the years between 1826 and his death. Today, he maybe best known for acquiring and expanding Airville, now on the National Register of Historic Places or as the nephew of lawyer Thomas Smith Jr. of Mathews County (which split from Gloucester County when this man was a boy). Four other men of the same name also served in the Virginia General Assembly.

== Early life and education ==
The eldest son born to Martha Tabb (1757-1821) and her husband, Rev. Armistead Smith (1756-1817) was born as the American Revolutionary War ended. His Virginia born father had been educated at the College of William and Mary in Williamsburg and served in the college's militia unit during the conflict. Rev. Armistead Smith then was ordained as a minister in the reorganized Episcopal Church in 1793, became rector of Kingston Parish (which became Mathews County in 1791), and continued there the rest of his life. When this boy was an infant, his father (married women lacking legal status) owned 11 adult slaves, enslaved 12 children and also was taxed for six horses, 30 cattle and a two wheeled carriage. The family lived at "Toddbury", and included two younger brothers: Philip (d. 1813) and William (1796-1878). This man also had three sisters (Lucy Armistead Smith who married her cousin Thomas Todd Tabb, Elizabeth who became the second wife of Col. Christopher Tompkins and Sallie who married Mr. Todd). However, this man never married. His uncle of the same name, a lawyer who represented Mathews county for many years, was the son of Col. Thomas Smith and so sometimes known as Thomas Smith Jr. (although the first man of that name to serve in the Virginia General Assembly).

== Career ==
Smith rose to the rank of captain in the local militia. In 1823 he and William Smart operated the two stores at the Gloucester county seat (also known as Gloucester or Gloucester Court House).

In 1827, this man and his brother William purchased "Airville", on a ridge overlooking Gloucester. It had been the home of John Dixon, the grandson of Rev. John Dixon who had served at Kingston Parish until 1770, and later taught at the College of William and Mary in Williamsburg. Thomas Smith added to and rebuilt Airville, but died four months after completion, and John Tabb Catlett acquired it from the estate.

Gloucester County voters first elected Smith as one of their representatives to the Virginia House of Delegates in 1826, and although he was not re-elected the next year, he did win re-election twice more before the Virginia Constitution of 1830 (which granted more representation to people in the state's western regions, as well as formally acknowledged slavery) reduced Gloucester County's representation to one man. Although William K. Perrin became the sole delegate immediately after that reduction, this man won the (part-time) position in 1832 and was re-elected until his death.

Although the 1820 census for Gloucester County included two men of the same name, one of whom owned no slaves, and the other of whom owned about a dozen slaves, the census of 1830 (the first after the death of his mother, descended from the First Families of Virginia, showed Thomas Smith as owning 65 enslaved people (of whom 38 were men), and probably 70 in the last federal census in his lifetime.

== Death and legacy ==
Smith died at his home on April 13, 1841. His gravestone is at historic Ware Parish Church in Gloucester.
