= Hudgins v. Wright =

1806 freedom suit in Virginia

Hudgins v. Wright (1806) was a freedom suit decided in the favor of the slave Jackey Wright by the Virginia Supreme Court (then called the Court of Appeals). She had sued for freedom for herself and her two children based on her claim of descent from Indian women. Indian slavery had been prohibited in Virginia since 1705. Since 1662, slave law had incorporated the principle of partus sequitur ventrem, saying that children born in the colony took the social status of their mothers.

Noted jurist George Wythe, had ruled in Wright's favor in the first trial in the Chancery Court, relying on the presumption of persons being born free as expressed in the 1776 Virginia Declaration of Rights. Her master Houlder Hudgins appealed the decision, saying that Wright was enslaved based on mixed-race ancestry that included African. The Virginia Supreme Court, writing after Chancellor Wythe's death, upheld his decision, but upon much narrower grounds, defining a difference between presumptions about people of Indian and African descent.

St. George Tucker, a noted justice of the Virginia Supreme Court, participated in ruling on the appeals case. He and his fellow justices ruled that the appellant had not provided sufficient evidence to offset Wright's claim to be of Indian descent through her maternal line, as witnesses testified about her mother and grandmother. As a result, based on the long prohibition in the colony against Indian slavery and the Wrights' appearance as "white", Jackey Wright and her two children gained their liberty.

== Background ==
Jackey Wright had sued for freedom from slavery for her and her two children based on her direct descent through her mother's line from generations of Indian women, as Indian slavery had been abolished in 1705 in the Virginia colony. The justices of the Virginia Supreme Court noted that the Wrights appeared "white" or European, relying on a factual findings of fair skin and straight black hair made by Wythe as the trial judge. Wright's great-grandmother was Frances Mingo, an Indian woman of Prince George County, Virginia. Wright's mother Phoebe was a slave, bought by Sir John Peyton and sold (with Jackie) by Peyton's estate to Hudgins in 1794 for 55 pounds sterling. Wright said that she was Indian and held illegally. Phoebe was a daughter of Hannah and granddaughter of Butterwood Nan, also said to be Indian; both were described by witnesses as having "Indian" characteristics, such as long straight hair. Since 1662 Virginia slave law held that children in the colony took the social status of their mother, according to the principle of partus sequitur ventrem. Slavery for Indians in Virginia was prohibited after 1691 or 1705, depending on judicial interpretation. Hudgins, the Wrights' master, had claimed that Wright was legally enslaved because she was of mixed race and partial African descent. (This shows how closely African ethnicity was associated with slavery.) But, he did not prove she had African ancestry, merely claimed that her mother and grandmother were women other than those she had claimed.

Judge Wythe had ruled that, based on the 1776 Virginia Declaration of Rights, there was a presumption that residents were born free. He freed the family holding that Hudgins failed to prove maternal descent from an enslaved African.

Wright was represented by attorney George K. Taylor. He noted that "If, in fact, the appellees are descended from Indians, it is incumbent on the appellant to prove that they are slaves; the appellees are not bound to prove the contrary." The justices of the Virginia Supreme Court held that the appellant had not proved that Wright had any maternal African ancestry and said that, as Indians had been considered free since at least 1705, she and her children were also free. St. George Tucker and other justices, all slaveholders, disagreed with Wythe's application of the state's Bill of Rights. Tucker said that it applied only to "free citizens and aliens" and could not be used to "overturn property rights" in slaves, as previous precedent had established that Moors, Negroes (Africans), and mulattoes, all non-Christian, had been brought into the territory only as slaves.

The court observed that witnesses had testified to Wright's grandmother Hannah's appearance: copper complexion and straight hair, as well as what was described as a "noble character," as proof she was not black. Legal historian Ariela Gross wrote in her 2008 book, a study of court cases and other means of defining race in America, that the court's ruling confirmed that "Indians were by default citizens of a free nation; Africans were by default members of an enslaved race."

== See also ==
- American slave court cases
