= Thomas Hudgins (Virginia) =

Virginia politician, planter and landowner

Member of the Virginia House of Delegates for Mathews County, Virginia
- In office November 30, 1812 – May 16, 1813 Serving with Christopher Tompkins
- Preceded by: Richard Billups
- Succeeded by: Richard Billups
- In office December 4, 1815 – November 10, 1816 Serving with Richard Billups
- Preceded by: Langley B. Eddens
- Succeeded by: William H Ransom

Member of the Virginia House of Delegates for Mathews and MiddlesexCounties
- In office December 4, 1820 – December 1, 1822 Serving with Thomas James Jr., Murtius S. Sparks
- Preceded by: James H. Roy
- Succeeded by: John Patterson

Personal details
- Born: March 14, 1788 Mathews County, Virginia
- Died: December 10, 1862 (aged 74) Woodlawn plantation, Henrico County, Virginia
- Spouse: 4
- Relations: Houlder Hudgins (father); Houlder Hudgins Jr. (brother)
- Children: 8 reached adulthood
- Occupation: planter, politician

Military service
- Years of service: 1812-1815
- Rank: colonel
- Unit: Virginia Militia, 61st Regiment
- Battles/wars: War of 1812

Thomas Hudgins (sometimes misspelled Huggens or Huggins) (March 14, 1788- December 10, 1862), was a Virginia planter and politician who represented his native Mathews County (and sometimes neighboring Middlesex County) in the Virginia House of Delegates.

== Early life and education ==
Born to the shipbuilder, merchant and politician Houlder Hudgins and his second wife, Mary Gwynn. He had an elder brother, John Lewis Hudgins, and half-brothers William, Robert and Houlder Hudgins Jr., as well as a full sister Mary, and several half-sisters. Hudgins received a private education appropriate to his class at Colonel Charles Carter's Academy in Fredericksburg.

Although baptized in (now historic) Kingston Parish of the Episcopal Church, as an infant, his former vestryman father soon helped divest that parish's glebe lands and helped found the Baptist Church in Mathews Courthouse (now Mathews, Virginia) (but his younger brother of the same name discussed below would much later fund the chapel building). As an adult, this man became active not only in that congregation (becoming chairman of the Mathews County Committee of Baptist Correspondents), he attended every Baptist national conference representing the Mathews congregation until he moved to the state capital in Richmond after financial reverses, and lived at the home of his daughter, Mrs. Mattie Lee Hudgins Spotts, where he died during the American Civil War. Hudgins also was a trustee of Richmond College (now the University of Richmond) from 1834 to 1845, of Columbian College (now George Washington University) from 1840 to 1858, and of the College of William & Mary at various times.

== Military ==
During the War of 1812, Hudgins initially served as major in the 61st Regiment of Virginia Militia, and was promoted to colonel in 1814.

== Career ==
Hudgins was also a planter, and inherited "Seaford" plantation in Mathews County, which he farmed using enslaved labor. He owned more than 74 slaves in Mathews county at the time of the 1830 federal census, which number grew to 131 slaves in the 1840 census, by far the largest number in the county. However, he experienced severe financial reverses, which family accounts attribute to other parties. An additional complication (beyond water damage to the surviving copies), is that his nephew Thomas Jefferson Hudgins and son Thomas Dew Hudgins were both born in the 1820s, so that each had reached legal age and probably managed his own household by the 1850 census. All the men named Thomas Hudgins collectively owned fewer than two dozen enslaved people in Mathews County in the 1850 and 1860 censuses, with variations of "Thomas Hudgins" mentioned in four pages of the 1850 census (three children on one page, a 12-year old boy on another, five adults (35 to 55 years old) on another) of which the largest number were 10 adults belonging to Thomas Jefferson Hudgins (becoming 11 in the 1860 census slave schedule). The separate pages indicate different owners, or that they were leased out (particularly after this man moved to Richmond), or both.

Following his father's political career, Hudgins won election to the Virginia House of Delegates for the 1812/13 session, and again won election around the time of his father's death when redistricting expanded the district to include neighboring Middlesex County, which Hudgins represented in the 1815/1816 sessions. Mathews and Middlesex voters again elected Hudgins in 1820 and re-elected him the following year. His youngest brother, Houlder Hudgins Jr., indirectly succeeded him as legislator, and once was asked to run for U.S. Congress, but declined, and this man ran instead, but lost.

== Personal life ==
Like his father, Thomas Hudgins married four times, but unlike his father, survived all his wives. His first wife, Ann Clark (1785–1811) bore one daughter, named Virginia Ann Hudgins (1809–1831) who lived to marry Dr. John G. Crouch two years before his death. The widower married Ann Valentine (1794–1823), the daughter of William and Selah Valentine of Gates County, North Carolina, and who had moved to Richmond, Virginia with her brother Daniel Valentine to live with their aunt, Mrs. Elizabeth Valentine Lee, after their father's death. The couple had four daughters and one son who became adults (another son died as an infant in 1823). Their eldest daughter Eliza Ann Hudgins married lawyer George Thompson Todd of Caroline County, Virginia, who moved to Mathews and served in the Virginia House of Delegates before moving to northeast Texas and becoming a distinguished judge, with his two eldest sons serving as a Confederate States Army officers His daughter Rebecca Valentine Hudgins (1816–1860) married her cousin Dr. Albert Gwynn Hudgins and was active in the Second Baptist Church of Richmond before moving to nearby Hampton after becoming a widow. Her son Albert Gallatin Hudgins Jr. (1840–1895) was a cadet at the U.S. Naval Academy at Annapolis when the Civil War started and after receiving a commission as lieutenant late in the war, joined the Confederate States Navy under Admiral Raphael Semmes and was twice captured and sentenced to be executed as a pirate, but survived to marry and eventually died in Richmond. Two of his sisters (this man's granddaughters) married Confederate officers. Virginia Bird Hudgins married CSA Major J. Booton Hill, Columbia Hudgins married Col. John Baytop Cary of Hampton, who founded the Hampton Military Academy (which later generations of the family attended before completing their educations at either the College of William & Mary or at Columbian College in Washington, D.C.). The youngest daughter, Mattie Lee Hudgins married Dr. James Campbell Spotts, a legislator from Tazewell County, Virginia who owned "Woodlawn" plantation in Henrico County near Richmond, where he died in 1858 and this man died a few years later.

This widower married his third wife, Elizabeth G. Dew (died 1833) on September 4, 1827. She was the daughter of Captain Thomas R. Dew of "Dewsville" plantation in King and Queen County, Virginia and sister of Professor Thomas R. Dew who would become President of the College of William & Mary (the family traced its descent from burgess Thomas Dewe). Before Mrs. Elizabeth Hudgins died, she bore two sons, Thomas Dew Hudgins (1829–1889), and William P. Hudgins (1831–1912) who became principal of Northumberland Academy in Virginia, then enlisted as a private in the Confederate States Army, where he rose to become an orderly sergeant and fought in several battles before a wound caused his transfer to Richmond where he became chief inspector of the Confederacy's Post-Office Department for the Trans-Mississippi Division and ultimately moved to Texas where he started an academy after the war, then became an officer of the Texas and Pacific Railroad before becoming a special agent of the U.S. Treasury Department in the administration of President Grover Cleveland. On April 12, 1835, this man married his fourth wife, Rosanna King (b. 1812-died before 1862), who gave birth to a daughter Valentine Hudgins (born 1838) who died as a teenager.

== Death and legacy ==
Hudgins, a widower but with several surviving children and grandchildren, died at his daughter's Richmond home on December 16, 1862.
