= Thomas Smith Jr. =

American planter, patriot and politician

Thomas Smith

Member of the Virginia House of Delegates for Mathews County
- In office October 1, 1792 – December 3, 1797 Serving with Holder Hudgins
- Preceded by: position created
- Succeeded by: William Buckner

Member of the Virginia House of Delegates for Gloucester County
- In office Oct 18, 1790 – 1791 Serving with John Billups
- Preceded by: Mordecai Cooke
- Succeeded by: James Baytop
- In office May 1, 1780 – Oct 18, 1789 Serving with Thomas Peyton, John Page, James Hubbard, Mann Page Jr.
- Preceded by: John Whiting
- Succeeded by: Mann Page

Personal details
- Born: Gloucester County, Colony of Virginia
- Died: Mathews County, Virginia
- Parents: Captain Thomas Smith (father); Ann (mother)
- Relatives: Rev. Armistead Smith (brother); Thomas Smith (Gloucester politician)(nephew)
- Education: College of William & Mary

Military service
- Allegiance: United States
- Branch/service: Virginia Militia
- Rank: major

Thomas Smith (circa 1755 – circa 1800) was an American lawyer, militia officer and politician in Virginia who represented Gloucester then newly created Mathews County in the Virginia House of Delegates for most of the years between 1780 and 1796, as well as Gloucester County in the Virginia Ratifying Convention in 1788. The first of six men of the same name to serve in the Virginia General Assembly, as described below, his relationship to Sir Thomas Smith, Treasurer of the Virginia Company in the 17th century is unclear.

== Early life and education ==
This man was the eldest son born to Dorothy Armistead and her husband Capt. Thomas Smith of "Beechland" in what was then Gloucester County. His parents had married about 1753 and before Dorothy died, her family also included three daughters (Susannah, Elizabeth and Anne would reach adulthood) and a second son (whom they named Armistead). His father remarried on December 20, 1771, to Ann Plater of Maryland, who survived him but bore no children. During the American Revolutionary War, the senior Thomas Smith served in the 1st Virginia Regiment, and eventually held the rank of colonel in the county militia. During the conflict (1776-1778), Thomas the younger and his brother Armistead studied at the College of William and Mary in Williamsburg; both brothers were among the founders of Phi Beta Kappa society, with this man as its first secretary. His brother Rev. Armistead Smith was ordained as a minister in the Episcopal Church in 1793 and became rector of Kingston Parish, then historic Ware and Abington parishes.

The published family genealogy claims they were descended from nephews (Arthur and Alexander) of the Virginia Company treasurer who never visited the colony. The first members of this Smith family to settle in Gloucester County were named Lawrence and John Smith, who were sons of Thomas Smith, the son of Arthur Smith who emigrated to Virginia in 1622 (around the time of native uprisings) and settled in Isle of Wight County (south of the James River). Several of that Arthur Smith's descendants would serve as burgesses from southside Virginia counties. Meanwhile John Smith of "Purton" in Gloucester County would become speaker of the House of Burgesses, and married Anne Bernard in 1662. They had one son, also John Smith (Jr.), who married Mary Warner on February 17, 1680 and had a son John Smith (III) as well as Augustine Smith of "Shooters Hill", Philip Smith and daughters Mildred, Mary, Elizabeth and Anne. John Smith III married Anne Alexander in 1711, and had a son also John Smith (IV) who lived in Gloucester County and might have been the revolutionary Captain Thomas Smith's father. Meanwhile, Arthur's brother Alexander Smith settled in Middlesex County (also north of the York River) by 1634.

== Career ==
This Thomas Smith would inherit the family home (built around 1730), once known as "Centerville" but renamed at some time after his death as "Woodstock." Like his father, Smith farmed (or operated maritime businesses) using enslaved labor. The 1787 tax census for Gloucester County included two men of the same name, one of whom owned one enslaved adult and one enslaved child, as well as two horses and ten cattle, and the other of whom owned 28 adult slaves, 30 enslaved children, 12 horses, 49 cattle and a 4-wheeled phaeton.

This Thomas Smith began his public career on the Kingston parish vestry by 1782, and was re-elected many times, as well as served as the parish's delegate to the convention that founded the Protestant Episcopal Church in 1787. His father had served on the Kingston parish vestry since at least 1757, and both men served jointly several times, including in 1785 and 1792. According to surviving parish records, both men had enslaved people baptized in the parish beginning in 1760 through 1777.

Gloucester County voters first elected this Thomas Smith as one of their representatives to the Virginia House of Delegates in 1780, and repeatedly re-elected him alongside other men (Thomas Peyton, John Page five times, James Hubbard, Mann Page Jr.) until 1789 (when Mordecai Cooke served alongside Mann Page). This man also represented Gloucester County in the Virginia Ratifying Convention in 1788, when alongside Warner Lewis, he voted to ratify the federal constitution.

In the 1790 legislative session, this man and Mordecai Cooke represented Gloucester County when fellow legislators at the urging of speaker (and Brigadier General) Thomas Mathews split off Kingston parish (and part of Mathews Parish) to form Mathews County. Both this man and his father (the County's first sheriff in 1792) accepted the new county's seal (signifying its shipbuilding history) from Governor Mathews on February 11, 1793. While his father became the new county's first sheriff (a lucrative position in this era when such could earn a commission for collecting taxes), this man and founding shipbuilder (and fellow planter) Houlder Hudgins represented the new county in the Virginia House of Delegates.

== Death and legacy ==
Neither this man nor his father appear in the 1800 federal census (perhaps because those records for Mathews County are lost), though the historic Ware Parish Church in Gloucester has a gravestone commemorating his brother Rev. Armistead Smith and other family members. His nephew (Armistead's son) Thomas Smith would represent Gloucester County early in the 19th century. Although his father's family bible was destroyed, his father's will dated Kingston Parish February 11, 1789 survived and notes that his daughter Anne who had married an Armistead had died, and made provision for her children as well as this man, Rev. Armistead Smith and sisters Susannah S. and Elizabeth Buckner. This man had married Rosamond Lilly Dens of Mid Lothian in Gloucester County, who would remarry twice, but immediately after his death lived with his father's widow, Ann Plater Smith, at Beechland.
