= Houlder Hudgins (Virginia) =

Virginia politician, planter and landowner

Holder Hudgins

Member of the Virginia Senate for Gloucester, Middlesex and Mathews Counties
- In office December 7, 1807 – December 3, 1815
- Preceded by: Christopher Garland
- Succeeded by: Richard Jones

Member of the Virginia House of Delegates for Mathews County, Virginia
- In office December 3, 1804 – December 6, 1807 Serving with James Spark, John Peyton
- Preceded by: Lyne Shackelford
- Succeeded by: Richard Billups

Member of the Virginia Senate for Gloucester, Middlesex and Mathews Counties
- In office December 2, 1799 – 1802
- Preceded by: Warner Lewis
- Succeeded by: Richard Baynham

Member of the Virginia House of Delegates for Mathews County, Virginia
- In office December 3, 1798 – December 1, 1799 Serving with Zadock Litchfield
- Preceded by: William Buckner
- Succeeded by: Joseph Billups Jr.
- In office October 1, 1792 – December 27, 1796 Serving with Thomas Smith Jr.
- Preceded by: position created
- Succeeded by: William Buckner

Personal details
- Born: January 10, 1749 Clifton, Wales
- Died: December 12, 1815 (aged 66) Clifton plantation, Mathews County, Virginia
- Spouse(s): Mary Hunley; Mary Gwynn; Elizabeth Anderson; Harriet Cluverius
- Children: at least 5 sons and 4 daughters including Houlder Hudgins Jr., Thomas Hudgins
- Parents: William Hudgins (father); Mary Houlder (mother)
- Relatives: Lady Charlotte Houlder Howard
- Education: Royal Naval College
- Occupation: shipbuilder, merchant, politician

Military service
- Allegiance: United States
- Branch/service: Virginia Militia
- Rank: lieutenant
- Battles/wars: Battle of Gwynn's Island

Houlder Hudgins (January 10, 1749 – December 12, 1815) (also spelled "Holder" or "Hudgens"), was a Virginia shipbuilder, merchant, planter, military officer and politician who served approximately two decades (part-time) in both houses of the Virginia General Assembly representing Mathews County (which was created in his lifetime). He may now be best known as the unsuccessful defendant in Hudgins v. Wright, a freedom suit brought by Jackey Wright and decided by Virginia Chancellor George Wythe and later the predecessor of the Virginia Supreme Court. Complicating matters, his will indicates he was survived by a son (and grandson) of the same name; Houlder Hudgins Jr. (1799-1868) also served in the Virginia House of Delegates (representing Mathews County at various times between 1824 and 1838).

== Early life and education ==
The youngest son born to the former Mary Houlder, and her Welsh merchant husband William Hudgins was born in Wales across the river from Bristol, England. Accounts of the family's arrival in Virginia differ. A modern source relying on family research claims that this man's father, merchant and shipmaster William Hudgins and his three younger brothers (John, Lewis and Robert, all ship captains), arrived in the Virginia colony in 1743, purchased land along the Piankatank River (a tributary of the York River) in what was then Gloucester County's Kingston parish, and later purchased land claims across the York River in Elizabeth City and York Counties, as well as westward in Middlesex and Hanover Counties then being settled. That account claims this man was born in 1739 in England, as was his younger brother William (born in 1740) before their mother joined her husband in Virginia. There she died after giving birth to Lewis Selwyn Hudgins in 1744 and (another) Robert Hudgins in 1746. The widower William Hudgins remarried to Joanna Deggs, who gave birth to sons (this man's half-brothers) Anthony (b. 1757) and William Deggs Hudgins in 1761 as well as to daughter Millie Hudgins in 1759 before William Hudgins Sr. died. That account continues that after his mother's death, Houlder was sent back to England for education overseen by Robert Hudgins Sr. in Bristol, then was commissioned a Royal Naval officer in 1756, and attained the rank of captain before resigning after nine years of service, receiving a land grant of 1200 acres adjoining his father's plantation, and returned to the Virginia colony with housebuilding materials in 1768.

An much earlier account by Lyon Gardiner Tyler states his elder brother Thomas and sisters Charlotte and Mary moved to Nova Scotia before this man arrived in New York circa 1766. Houlder was devoted to his maternal grandmother, Lady Charlotte Howard, who was related to noble English families, and for whom he later named a boat.

In any event, this man received a private education appropriate to his class at Christ College in Bristol (possibly Christ College Brecon) and the Royal Naval College at Dartmouth in Devonshire.

== Military ==
During the American Revolutionary War, despite his prior British service, Hudgins held the rank of lieutenant in the Gloucester County militia under Captain Tabb and Colonel John Peyton. One of the earliest battles of the conflict was near his home, as colonial forces evicted Governor Dunmore after the Battle of Gwynn's Island on July 8, 1776. Hudgins's boat, the Lady Charlotte, had been commandeered by the British and tasked with preventing the rebels from accessing the island, as well as annoying them "by every means in her power." However, Continental forces captured her, and she served the patriot navy during the rest of the war.

Hudgins also built ships for the patriot forces. On September 26, 1776, he and five fellow residents of Kingston Parish were authorized to construct large flat-bottomed boats that could be used to transport troops, and the following month, the Navy Board ordered one of those men, Captain William Smith (who also headed a company of local minutemen) to release any of his men who were ship carpenters or apprentices. Late in the conflict (which ended after the Siege of Yorktown across Mobjack Bay), Col. Peyton reported that occasionally British ships continued to sail into the Piankatank River, come ashore on Gwynn's Island, and steal livestock, and that occasionally slaves fled toward British areas. After the conflict, Hudgins successfully filed claims for two weeks use of a boat, as well as for 55.5 pounds of bacon, 2 lambs and 750 pounds of beef.

Later, in 1810, as one of the "Silver Greys" (Revolutionary War veterans), Hudgins petitioned Governor Barbour for arms and artillery pieces, and by 1812 was captain of one of two companies thereby formed to defend Mathews from British raids. His sons also served in the Mathews militia or U.S. forces in the conflict.

== Career ==
This elder Houlder Hudgins established two shipyards in the Colony of Virginia. One was at Milford Haven overlooking Gwynn's island, and the other at Back Bay behind Old Point Comfort on the Chesapeake Bay in Elizabeth City County. Hudgins also had a fleet of packet boats traveling between Barbados and Massachusetts Bay. By 1790, just before the creation of Mathews County, those and nearby shipyards were building a dozen ships a year each carrying over 20 tons, which led to Mathews Courthouse becoming a port of entry (1802-1844, closure being attributed to silting due to post-woodcutting erosion), and by the time of his death Mathews County shipyards were credited with building a third of all ships built in the Commonwealth of Virginia.

=== Planter and merchant ===
Hudgins owned land and enslaved people in Mathews and several nearby counties by the time of his death, and also built two manor houses, one of which burned down decades after his death and the other survived until the modern era, although accounts differ as to the time of their construction. When Virginia enacted a special tax in 1815 to pay for the debts incurred in the War of 1812, although his 22-room Clifton residence was not the most opulent in the county (James Sparks' home being valued at $700), his home and that of his eldest son John L. Hudgins were among the ten valued at $500, and the homes owned by his son Thomas Hudgins and William Respess were valued at $400, and nine homes of other men valued at $300 were also subject to the special tax. According to Tyler, Hudgins' estate included 700 acres of land in Tidewater Virginia (lands in Elizabeth City, Middlesex, Mathews and Gloucester Counties), as well as 200 slaves, although as discussed below, that number is difficult to verify.

According to modern research, by the time of his death, Hudgins owned two plantations in Mathews County (which had been created from Gloucester County in his lifetime): one where he lived (on the Piankatank River near Cobbs Creek and Gwynn's Island which he named "Clifton" after his father's home in Wales), and one between Raymond Creek and Bald Eagle Creek which was originally called the Ransome plantation but which was bought by William Hayes who at some unclear time (due to the destruction of court records) was acquired by this man and which became known as the "Isle of Wight" plantation. Hudgins also owned "Chesterville" (bought from George Wythe) and another farm across Mobjack Bay in Elizabeth City County (in what became Hampton). There he build the manor house which he called "Lamington", importing all the bricks and tiles from England and Wales. Hudgins entertained many fellow planters of Tidewater Virginia at "Clifton", including members of the Washington family. Hudgins farmed using enslaved labor, and also brought artisans from Liverpool for his shipyard, as well as to develop the colony's resources. Ships (some built in Mathews) sailed from Westville (later "Mathews Courthouse", now Mathews) to Massachusetts Bay, Britain and the West Indies in what was later known as the Triangular Trade.

=== Politician ===
Hudgins became a justice of the peace for Gloucester County by 1789, but severed his connection with Kingston parish about the same time, as he had become affiliated with the Baptist Church (of which his brother Robert Hudgins and Caleb Hunley were ministers), and would then attend Baptist conventions. He had served on the Kingston parish vestry 1780-1787, and later was one of six men who supervised the privitization of the parish glebe.

When the Virginia legislature created Mathews County from what had been Kingston parish (the peninsular part of Gloucester County), it named the new county after the Speaker of the House who had successfully pushed for its creation. Hudgins's main residence was in the new county, and he became one of the justices of the peace of the new county, which in that era also jointly administered the county. a

Mathews County voters elected Hutchins and lawyer Thomas Smith Jr. as their first two representatives in the Virginia House of Delegates, and Mathew Anderson (possibly the father or brother of this man's third wife) as the state senator, then re-elected the three men until 1797. In the late 1797 election, Mathews County voters instead elected William Buckner and William Lane as their delegates, although the next year they again elected Hudgins, this time alongside Zadock Litchfield, before Hudgins first successfully ran for the Virginia Senate. Hudgins first served a four year term (also part-time) in the Virginia Senate representing Mathews County and nearby Middlesex and Gloucester Counties in 1799. He returned to the House of Delegates in 1805, this time serving twice alongside John Peyton. Hudgins then returned to the Virginia Senate, and was re-elected until his death.

=== Slavery ===
Hudgins clearly owned slaves both before and after the Revolutionary War, and the Hudgins v. Wright freedom suit came about in 1806 after Hudgins sold Jackey Wright and her three children to a slave trader who planned to transport them out of the state. She claimed descent from Frances Mingo (an Indian woman from Prince George County on the James River), her daughter Betty Mingo, and that her mother Phoebe Wilson was Betty's daughter who had been sold to Sir John Peyton, and that Hudgins had purchased them both from Sir John Peyton's estate. Hudgins said that Wright had always been a slave (because her father was Indian, not her mother) and that he legally bought her in 1794 for 55 pounds sterling. Hudgins also hired noted attorney Edmund Randolph, who noted the "grounds of the decree are subversive to slavery."

In the 1787 Virginia tax census for Gloucester County, Hudgins enslaved nine adults and twelve people under 16 years old, as well as paid taxes for seven horses and 27 cattle. The 1810 census for Mathews County (the last federal census in his lifetime) included two men named H. or Houlder Hudgins, one with an eight person household including 2 slaves, and the other with nine people in the household and 86 slaves, including an old man more than 45 years old, 2 boys between 10 and 16 years old, 2 boys less than 10 years old, two women between 16 and 26 years old, 2 girls between 10 and 16 years old, and 3 girls less than 10 years old. That same census shows a Gregory Hudgins as owning 2 slaves and this man's merchant son William Hudgins owning 31 slaves. While Tyler a century ago claimed that Hudgins owned 200 slaves when he died, modern digital census searches fail to corroborate that number, in part because records were destroyed in courthouse fires as well as the Richmond evacuation fire of April 1865.

During the War of 1812, Hudgins lost ten slaves, and feared that he might lose the rest and be "left in his old age destitute of support." His will discussed below, may with other unspecified documents account for Tyler's 200 slave estimate, for it specifically gave his wife and two sons twenty slaves apiece, designated many slaves as allotted to specific relatives, bequeathed working plantations to others (tax data or now-lost records may indicate the slaves linked to those properties) and gave his "waitman" Charles (probably his personal slave since he was a boy, as was a planter custom of the era) a limited choice of master or mistress.

== Personal life ==
Hudgins married multiple times, and further confusion resulted because one son as well as a grandson (and later generations) shared the same name. His last will (written in February 1815) mentioned (and provided for) a daughter named Charlotte, as well as sons Houlder Hudgins Jr.(the youngest), John (whose son a/k/a this man's grandson also mentioned was also Houlder Hudgins, hence III), William H. (who became a merchant in Mathews), Robert and Thomas. The will names other surviving daughters as Nancy Berry, Ariadna Vaughan and Mary Winder.

In 1769 Houlder Hudgins married Mary Hunley (1742-1773) of York County, who gave birth to a son and a daughter. She was related to Rev. Thomas Muse Hunley, with whom this man founded the first Baptist Church in the county, with whom several of this man's sons would be affiliated. Their firstborn son, William Houlder Hudgins (1771-1840) become a merchant as well as inherited "Milford Haven" (possibly from his namesake grandfather). He married Frances Gwynn (of the family for whom Gwynn's Island is named, though the only legislator in that family was early mariner Hugh Gwynn who represented Gloucester County in the mid-17th century), and was survived by a daughter and son. Their firstborn daughter, Nancy Yeatman Hudgins (1773-1838) successively married John Berry (which marriage produced five sons as well as a daughter Mary who married Baptist Rev. John Boss), then John Burke (with whom she had another daughter named Mary Ellen as well as John Burke Jr. who had a son John Burke II who long served as the Mathews County Treasurer and 1905-1920 as the USDA Commissioner of Fishing for six Tidewater counties).

After his first wife's death, this widower Hudgins married Mary Gwynn (1744-1793). This daughter of his father's friends Hugh Gwynn and Frances Peyton Gwynn gave birth to two sons who were old enough by their father's death to serve as his executors, and a daughter. Their daughter Mary Gwynn Hudgins married Dr. John Winder of Hampton and had a son and two daughters.

The second son (first by his second wife), John Lewis Hudgins (1775-1871), would marry successive daughters of Capt. Mathew Anderson of 'Exchange' plantation in Gloucester County (Susan and Mary, and as discussed, below their sister Elizabeth became his father's third wife). However, J.L. Hudgins experienced severe financial problems in the 1830s which led to bankruptcy and a court case resolved in 1857. His firstborn son Dr. Albert Gwynn Hudgins (1805-1853) would graduate from the University of Maryland, then practiced medicine in Mathews County, Hampton and Richmond, as well as became active in the Baptist church and married his cousin Rebecca Valentine Hudgins (decades after this man's death); his brother Elliott Washington Hudgins (1807-1869) only married in 1858 (and his son and grandson of the same name lived in Hampton, Virginia and Kent, Maryland respectively). J.L. Hudgins' second marriage produced four children but two died young, and another on her wedding day, so only Thomas Jefferson Hudgins (1822-1914) survived to become a merchant and inherit "Bellefield" plantation.

This man's third son (second by his second wife), Col. Thomas Hudgins (1788-1862), inherited "Seaford" plantation on the Piankatank River two miles southeast of Gwynn's Island and had 74 slaves in 1830 and by 1840 may have been the wealthiest man in Mathews county (as well as its largest slaveholder with 131 slaves), Thomas and his younger half brother Houlder Hudgins II (discussed below) continued the family's military and political traditions by serving in the War of 1812, became Virginia legislators like their father, and were active in the local Baptist church, Dover Baptist Association and national Baptist conventions. Thomas Hudgins also had four wives (the first being Ann Clark and the second Ann Valentine of North Carolina) and was the most financially successful of the progeny before becoming poor through the mismanagement of agents. His third wife Elizabeth Dew was the sister of Professor Thomas R. Dew and bore two sons who survived the Civil War long after this man's death, one of whom (William H. Hudgins) rose to the rank of sergeant in the CSA Army and was assigned to Texas post office duty after recovering from his wounds and later held railroad and U.S. Treasury positions.

After his third wife's death, Hudgins on November 5, 1794 married Elizabeth Anderson whose father's "Exchange" plantation in Gloucester County adjoined Hudgins' Bellefield plantation, and whose sisters had successively married Hudgins' son John Lewis Hudgins. This marriage resulted in a daughter (Ariadne, who married James M. Vaughan and had five children), and two sons who still had not reached legal age at the time of their father's death. Robert Hudgins (1797-1859), inherited "Lamington" plantation near Old Point Comfort which was later sold to the U.S. Government and became the officer's Club for Langley Field. He married Harriet Jones, whose father Thomas Jones owned "Kennington" plantation in King William County, and the marriage produced three sons and three daughters (both sons serving in the Confederate army long after this man's death; the eldest Benjamin Franklin Hudgins, who graduated from VMI, captained the Hampton Grays and later the Old Dominion Dragoons). His brother Houlder Hudgins II (1799-1868) was reportedly his father's favorite, and inherited the family home, "Clifton" in Mathews County as well as "Bushy Forest" in Hanover County and "Ceeley" in Warwick County (now Newport News), and built a manor house he called "Freewelcome" on the Clifton plantation. In addition to his Virginia legislative duties, Houlder II held local offices and became Mathews county's chief magistrate, but refused to run for Congress because of this business interests in the West Indies and other obligations. He too married successive sisters, Sarah and Elizabeth Hunley, daughters of Robert T. Hunley of Mathews County.

This genealogy differs substantially from Tyler's, who claimed this man married two women from Richmond: first Anne Cluverius who supposedly bore three children, then the former Nancy Valentine, who gave birth to four children of whom two survived infancy. Ultimately, these sources agree that this man's widow was Harriett Whiting Anderson Cluverius, for whom he built Lamington in Hampton, and who bore this man's last child, a daughter Charlotte in either 1807, or 1810. Tyler names Harriet's father as British Col. Robert Anderson.

== Death and legacy ==
Hutchins died on December 12, 1815, survived by his young widow Harriet, several children and grandchildren. His will named sons John Hudgins (John S Hudgins, who had married Nancy Anderson) and Thomas Hudgins as executors, and gave them property, although the 500 acre main house and plantation were bequeathed to son Houlder Hudgins Jr. (not yet of legal age and who married Betsey Anderson) and if he died childless to his grandson Houlder Hudgins III. Sons William H. Hudgins and Robert Hudgins were also mentioned. In addition to providing for his widow during her lifetime, the will made provisions for his young daughter Charlotte Hudgins, as well as married daughters Nancy Berry, Ariadna Vaughan and Mary Winder (who received the Chesterfield plantation where she lived), and several grandchildren. Although most records of that era were lost in an 1820 Gloucester courthouse fire and Mathews records in the Richmond evacuation fire of April 1865, his will survives (and was re-entered into Mathews courthouse records) because in 1816 it led to litigation in the U.S. Circuit Court. Hudgins named several slaves, and allowed his "waitman" Charles "to choose which of my children he pleases for his master during the life of my daughter Mary Winder, but whoever he choses for his master, to account for his value to my estate." Hudgins also limited the inheritance of his granddaughter Martha P. Gayle, unless she renounced all connection and intercourse with John P. Gayle.

His son Thomas Hudgins continued the family political tradition by serving in the Virginia House of Delegates after the War of 1812, and his brother Houlder Hudgins Jr. also served in that legislative body. However, their eldest brother John Lewis Hudgins experienced financial reverses and declared bankruptcy after transferring certain lands to his brother Robert, to which transfers creditors objected, and the lower courts and U.S. Supreme Court ultimately decided against the Hudgins tactics in Hudgins v. Kemp, 61 U.S. 45 (1857).

Lamington passed out of the family's hands following the Civil War, but was used as an officer's club for U.S. military through World War II, although it is now only the name of a relatively short residential street in Hampton. His grandson Benjamin Franklin Hudgins (1831-1881, son of Robert) was captain of the Hampton Grays in the Civil War, and later captain of the Old Dominion Dragoons and aide de camp to General Pryor. Hudgins' former colonial mansion at Lamington became the officer's Club at Langley Field after establishment of that air base. Although Lamington is now a neighborhood in West Hampton, Virginia, many of his descendants continued as merchants in Hampton and Mathews County.
